= Electoral history of the Indian National Congress =

Since independence, the Indian National Congress has participated in elections. This article shows a list of the results of the elections for Congress.

== Rajya Sabha Seats ==
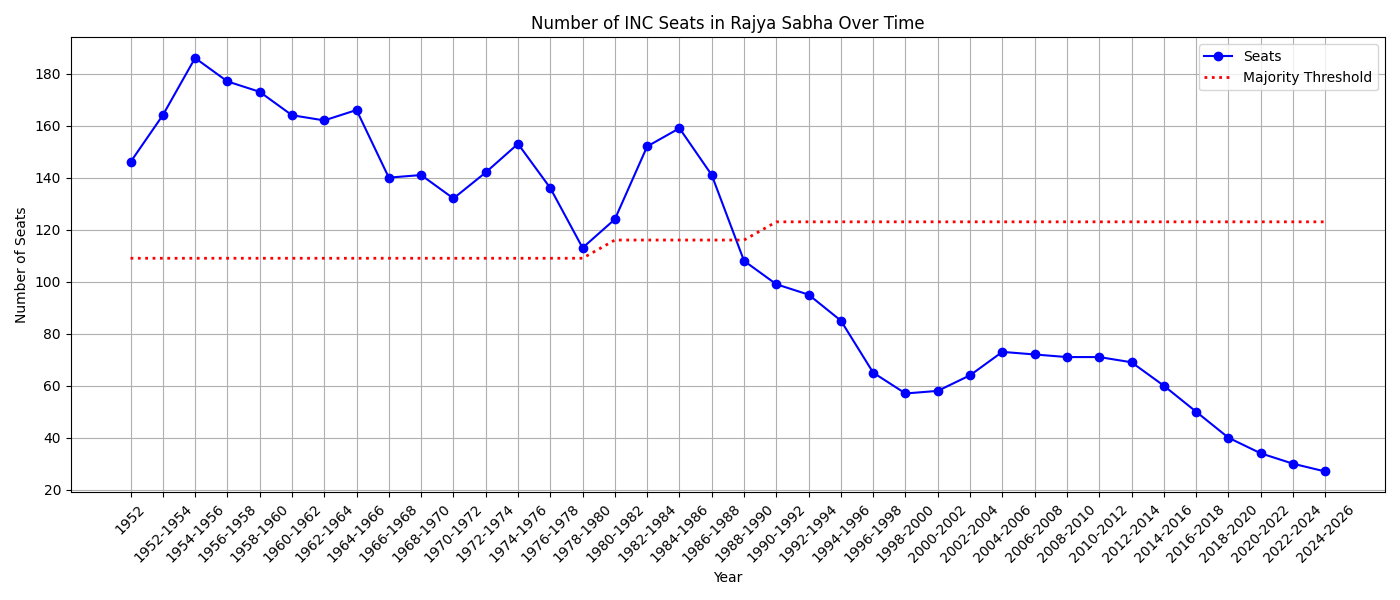
Rajya Sabba seats held by INC

Year	Number of Seats	Remarks
1952	146	
1952-1954	164	
1954-1956	186	
1956-1958	177	
1958-1960	173	
1960-1962	164	
1962-1964	162	
1964-1966	166	
1966-1968	140	
1968-1970	141	INC(R)-99 INC(O)-42
1970-1972	132	INC(R)-107 INC(O)-25
1972-1974	142	INC(R)-128 INC(O)-14
1974-1976	153	INC(R)-146 INC(O)-7
1976-1978	136	INC(R)-72 INC(O)-64
1978-1980	113	INC(R)-65 INC(O)-48
1980-1982	124	
1982-1984	152	
1984-1986	159	
1986-1988	141	
1988-1990	108	
1990-1992	99	
1992-1994	95	
1994-1996	85	
1996-1998	65	
1998-2000	57	
2000-2002	58	
2002-2004	64	
2004-2006	73	
2006-2008	72	
2008-2010	71	
2010-2012	71	
2012-2014	69	
2014-2016	60	
2016-2018	50	
2018-2020	40	
2020-2022	34	
2022-2024	30	
2024-2026	27	

== Lok Sabha Elections ==
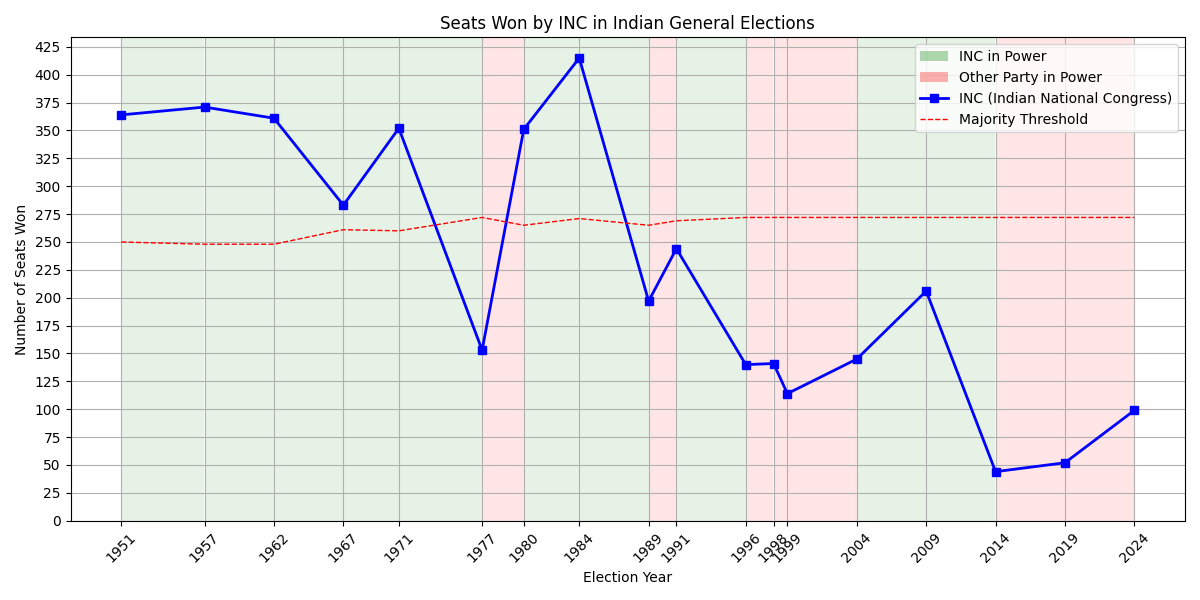
Seats Won by INC in Indian General Elections over the years

Year	Legislature	Party leader	Seats won	Change in seats	Percentage of votes	Vote swing	Outcome	Ref
1934	5th Central Legislative Assembly	Bhulabhai Desai	42 / 147	▲42	—N/a	—N/a	—N/a	
1945	6th Central Legislative Assembly	Sarat Chandra Bose	59 / 102	▲17	—N/a	—N/a	Interim Government of India (1946–1947)	
1951–52	1st Lok Sabha	Jawaharlal Nehru	364 / 489	▲364	44.99%	—N/a	Majority	
1957	2nd Lok Sabha	Jawaharlal Nehru	371 / 494	▲7	47.78%	▲2.79%	Majority	
1962	3rd Lok Sabha	Jawaharlal Nehru	361 / 494	▼10	44.72%	▼3.06%	Majority	
1967	4th Lok Sabha	Indira Gandhi	283 / 520	▼78	40.78%	▼2.94%	Majority (1967–69)	
1967	4th Lok Sabha	Indira Gandhi	283 / 520	▼78	40.78%	▼2.94%	Minority (1969–71)	
1971	5th Lok Sabha	Indira Gandhi	352 / 518	▲69	43.68%	▲2.90%	Majority	
1977	6th Lok Sabha	Indira Gandhi	153 / 542	▼199	34.52%	▼9.16%	Official Opposition	
1980	7th Lok Sabha	Indira Gandhi	351 / 542	▲198	42.69%	▲8.17%	Majority	
1984	8th Lok Sabha	Rajiv Gandhi	415 / 533	▲64	49.01%	▲6.32%	Majority	
1989	9th Lok Sabha	Rajiv Gandhi	197 / 545	▼218	39.53%	▼9.48%	Official Opposition	
1991	10th Lok Sabha	P. V. Narasimha Rao	244 / 545	▲47	35.66%	▼3.87%	Minority	
1996	11th Lok Sabha	P. V. Narasimha Rao	140 / 545	▼104	28.80%	▼7.46%	Official Opposition (1996)	
1996	11th Lok Sabha	P. V. Narasimha Rao	140 / 545	▼104	28.80%	▼7.46%	Outside support for UF (1996–97)	
1998	12th Lok Sabha	Sitaram Kesri	141 / 545	▲1	25.82%	▼2.98%	Official Opposition	
1999	13th Lok Sabha	Sonia Gandhi	114 / 545	▼27	28.30%	▲2.48%	Official Opposition	
2004	14th Lok Sabha	Sonia Gandhi	145 / 543	▲31	26.7%	▼1.6%	Coalition	
2009	15th Lok Sabha	Manmohan Singh	206 / 543	▲61	28.55%	▲2.02%	Coalition	
2014	16th Lok Sabha	Sonia Gandhi	44 / 543	▼162	19.3%	▼9.25%	Opposition	
2019	17th Lok Sabha	Rahul Gandhi	52 / 543	▲8	19.5%	▲0.2%	Opposition	
2024	18th Lok Sabha	Rahul Gandhi	99 / 543	▲47	21.19%	▲1.7%	Official Opposition	

All time-INC Lok Sabha seat count

== State Assemblies and Performances ==
=== Andhra Pradesh ===
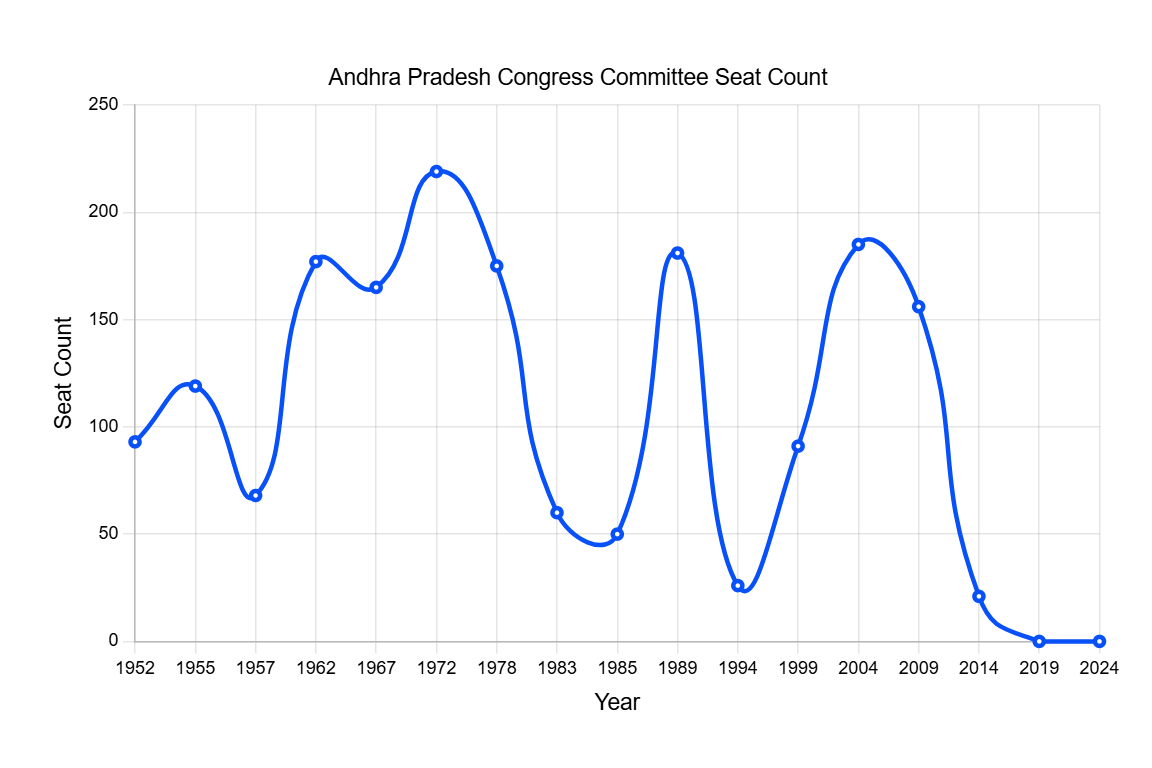
All time seat count of the Indian National Congress in Andhra Pradesh.

==== Legislative Assembly Elections ====
Year	Legislature	Leader	Seats Contested	Seats won	Seats Changes	Votes	Percentage of votes	Percentage Change	Outcome
Hyderabad State
1952	1st Assembly	Burgula Ramakrishna Rao	173	93 / 175	-	21,77,716	41.86	-	Government
Andhra Pradesh State
1955	1st Assembly	B. Gopala Reddy	142	119 / 196	-	3,394,109	39.35	-	Government
1957	2nd Assembly	Neelam Sanjiva Reddy	109	68 / 109	-	17,07,364	47.38	-	Government
1962	3rd Assembly	Neelam Sanjiva Reddy	300	177 / 300	▼10	5,523,359	47.25	▲5.53	Government
1967	4th Assembly	Kasu Brahmananda Reddy	287	165 / 287	▼12	6,292,649	45.42	▼1.83	Government
1972	5th Assembly	P. V. Narasimha Rao	287	219 / 287	▲54	7,474,255	52.29	▲6.87	Government
1978	6th Assembly	Marri Chenna Reddy	290	175 / 294	▼44	7,908,220	39.25	▼13.04	Government
1983	7th Assembly	Kotla Vijaya Bhaskara Reddy	294	60 / 294	▼115	7,090,907	33.64	▼5.67	Opposition
1985	8th Assembly	Kotla Vijaya Bhaskara Reddy	290	50 / 294	▼10	8,566,891	37.25	▲3.67	Opposition
1989	9th Assembly	Marri Chenna Reddy	287	181 / 294	▲131	13,539,785	47.09	▲9.84	Government
1994	10th Assembly	Kotla Vijaya Bhaskara Reddy	294	26 / 294	▼155	10,540,182	33.85	▼13.24	Opposition
1999	11th Assembly	Y.S. Rajasekhara Reddy	293	91 / 294	▲65	13,526,309	40.61	▲1.76	Opposition
2004	12th Assembly	Y.S. Rajasekhara Reddy	294	185 / 294	▲94	13,793,461	38.56	▼2.95	Government
2009	13th Assembly	Y.S. Rajasekhara Reddy	294	156 / 294	▼29	15,374,075	36.56	▼2.0	Government
2014	14th Assembly	Raghu Veera Reddy	286	21 / 294	▼135	56,68,061	11.71	▼24.84	Opposition
2019	15th Assembly	Raghu Veera Reddy	174	0 / 175	▼21	3,68,880	1.17	▼10.54	Opposition
2024	16th Assembly	Y. S. Sharmila	174	0 / 175	Steady	580,613	1.72	▲0.55	Opposition

==== General Elections ====
Year	General Election	Votes Polled	Seats Won	Seat Contested	Total Seats
Hyderabad State
1951	1st Lok Sabha	1,945,798	14	-	-
Andhra Pradesh
1957	2nd Lok Sabha	4,906,074	37	-	-
1962	3rd Lok Sabha	5,711,263	34	-	43
1967	4th Lok Sabha	6,354,959	35	-	41
1971	5th Lok Sabha	7,286,069	28	-	41
1977	6th Lok Sabha	9,582,708	41	-	42
1980	7th Lok Sabha	9,508,388	41	-	42
1984	8th Lok Sabha	9,452,394	6	-	42
1989	9th Lok Sabha	14,671,782	39	-	42
1991	10th Lok Sabha	11,610,772	25	-	42
1996	11th Lok Sabha	12,087,596	22	-	42
1998	12th Lok Sabha	12,269,475	22	-	42
1999	13th Lok Sabha	14,278,099	5	-	42
2004	14th Lok Sabha	14,861,984	29	-	41
2009	15th Lok Sabha	21,254,124	33	-	42
2014	16th Lok Sabha	5,578,329	0	-	25
2019	17th Lok Sabha	4,06,568	0	25	25
2024	18th Lok Sabha	8,86,165	0	25	25

=== Arunachal Pradesh ===
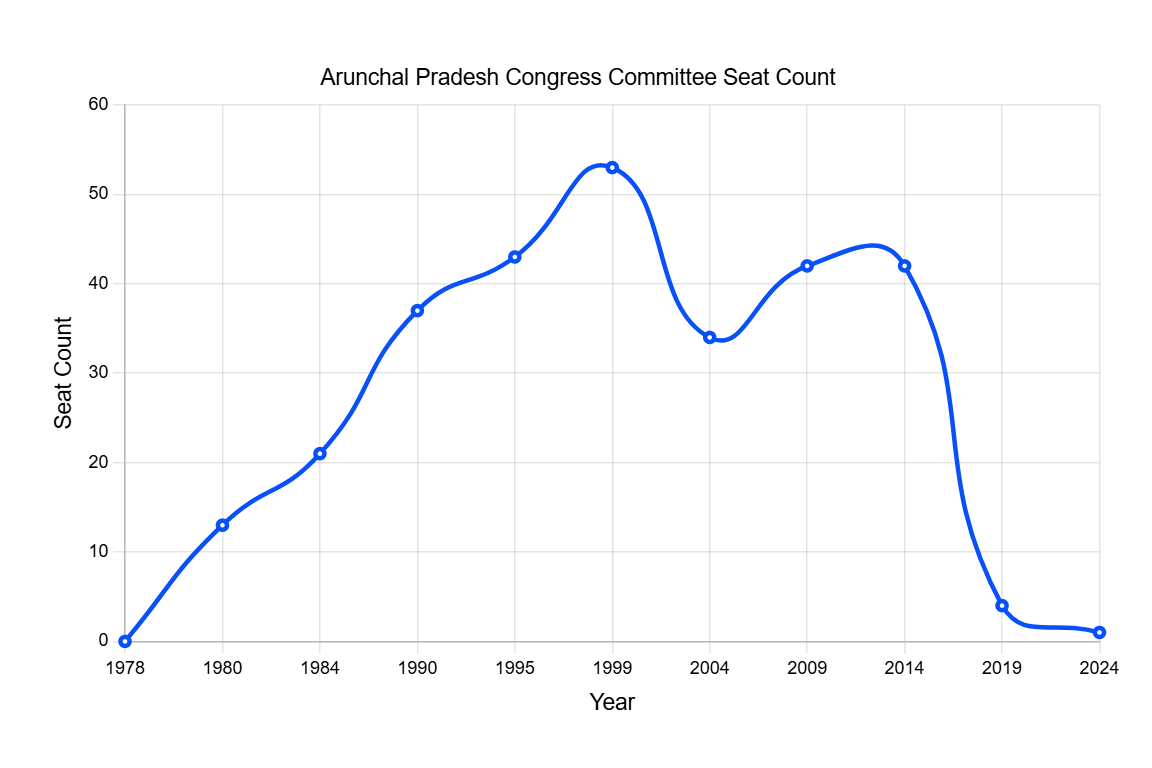
All time seat count of the Indian National Congress in Arunachal Pradesh.

==== Legislative Assembly Elections ====
Year	Legislature	Leader	Seats Contested	Seats won	Change in seats	Votes	Percentage of votes	Vote swing	Outcome
1978	1st Assembly	Tasso Grayu	1	0 / 30	-	720	0.45	-	Opposition
1980	2nd Assembly	Gegong Apang	28	13 / 30	▲13	72,734	42.58	▲42.13	Government
1984	3rd Assembly	Gegong Apang	30	21 / 30	▲8	96,791	43.07	▲0.49	Government
1990	4th Assembly	Gegong Apang	59	37 / 60	▲16	154,463	44.25	▲1.18	Government
1995	5th Assembly	Gegong Apang	60	43 / 60	▲6	214,543	50.5	▲6.25	Government
1999	6th Assembly	Mukut Mithi	60	53 / 60	▲10	213,097	51.78	▲1.28	Government
2004	7th Assembly	Gegong Apang	60	34 / 60	▼19	204,102	44.41	▼7.37	Government
2009	8th Assembly	Dorjee Khandu	60	42 / 60	▲8	879,288	50.38	▲5.97	Government
2014	9th Assembly	Nabam Tuki	60	42 / 60	Steady	251,575	49.5	▼0.88	Government
2019	10th Assembly	Nabam Tuki	60	4 / 60	▼38	1,04,536	16.86	▼32.6	Opposition
2024	11th Assembly	Nabam Tuki	19	1 / 60	▼3	33,877	5.56%	▼11.29	Opposition

==== General Elections ====
Year	General Election	Votes Polled	Seats Won	Seat Contested	Total Seats
1977	6th Lok Sabha	20,909	1	2	2
1980	7th Lok Sabha	76,600	2	2	2
1984	8th Lok Sabha	98,131	2	2	2
1989	9th Lok Sabha	136,541	2	2	2
1991	10th Lok Sabha	179,824	2	2	2
1996	11th Lok Sabha	84,615	0	2	2
1998	12th Lok Sabha	78,564	0	2	2
1999	13th Lok Sabha	242,275	2	2	2
2004	14th Lok Sabha	38,341	0	2	2
2009	15th Lok Sabha	234,689	2	2	2
2014	16th Lok Sabha	246,084	1	2	2
2019	17th Lok Sabha	134,888	0	2	2
2024	18th Lok Sabha	219,839	0	2	2

=== Assam ===
==== Assam Legislative Assembly election ====
Year	Legislature	Party leader	Seats Contested	Seats won	Change in seats	Votes	Percentage of votes	Vote swing	Outcome
1952	1st Assembly	Bishnu Ram Medhi	92	76 / 105	▲ new	10,64,850	43.48	▲ new	Government
1957	2nd Assembly	Bishnu Ram Medhi	101	71 / 108	▼5	13,21,367	52.35	▲8.87	Government
1962	3rd Assembly	Bimala Prasad Chaliha	103	79 / 105	▲8	11,79,305	48.25	▼4.1	Government
1967	4th Assembly	Bimala Prasad Chaliha	120	73 / 126	▼6	13,54,748	43.60	▼4.65	Government
1972	5th Assembly	Sarat Chandra Sinha	114	95 / 126	▲22	19,76,209	53.20	▲9.6	Government
1978	6th Assembly	Sarat Chandra Sinha	126	26 / 126	▼69	12,20,189	23.62	▼29.58	Opposition
1983	7th Assembly	Hiteswar Saikia	109	91 / 109	▲65	11,94,657	52.53	▲28.91	Government
1985	8th Assembly	Hiteswar Saikia	125	26 / 126	▼66	17,24,003	23.23	▼29.3	Opposition
1991	9th Assembly	Hiteswar Saikia	125	66 / 126	▲40	24,55,302	29.35	▲6.12	Government
1996	10th Assembly	Bhumidhar Barman	122	34 / 122	▼32	27,78,627	30.56	▲1.21	Opposition
2001	11th Assembly	Tarun Gogoi	126	71 / 126	▲39	42,30,676	39.75	▲9.19	Government
2006	12th Assembly	Tarun Gogoi	120	53 / 126	▼18	41,02,479	31.08	▼8.67	Government
2011	13th Assembly	Tarun Gogoi	126	78 / 126	▲25	54,43,781	39.39	▲8.31	Government
2016	14th Assembly	Tarun Gogoi	122	26 / 126	▼52	52,38,655	30.96	▼8.43	Opposition
2021	15th Assembly	Debabrata Saikia	95	29 / 126	▲3	57,03,341	29.67	▼1.29	Opposition
2026	16th Assembly	Gaurav Gogoi	99	19 / 126	▼10	64,64,216	29.84	▲0.17	Opposition

==== General Elections ====
Year	General Election	Votes Polled	Seats Won	Seat Contested	Total Seats
1951	1st Lok Sabha	1,210,707	9	-	10
1957	2nd Lok Sabha	1,184,708	9	-	12
1962	3rd Lok Sabha	1,126,977	9	-	12
1967	4th Lok Sabha	1,369,715	10	-	14
1971	5th Lok Sabha	1,724,503	13	-	14
1977	6th Lok Sabha	1,932,994	10	-	14
1980	7th Lok Sabha	323,359	2	-	14
1985	8th Lok Sabha	1,749,688	4	-	14
1989	9th Lok Sabha	-	-	-	
1991	10th Lok Sabha	2,409,284	8	-	14
1996	11th Lok Sabha	2,981,700	5	-	14
1998	12th Lok Sabha	3,264,032	10	-	14
1999	13th Lok Sabha	3,808,472	10	-	14
2004	14th Lok Sabha	3,637,405	9	14	14
2009	15th Lok Sabha	-	7	-	14
2014	16th Lok Sabha	44,67,295	3	13	14
2019	17th Lok Sabha	63,73,659	3	14	14
2024	18th Lok Sabha	74,78,077	3	13	14

=== Bihar ===
==== Bihar Legislative Assembly election ====
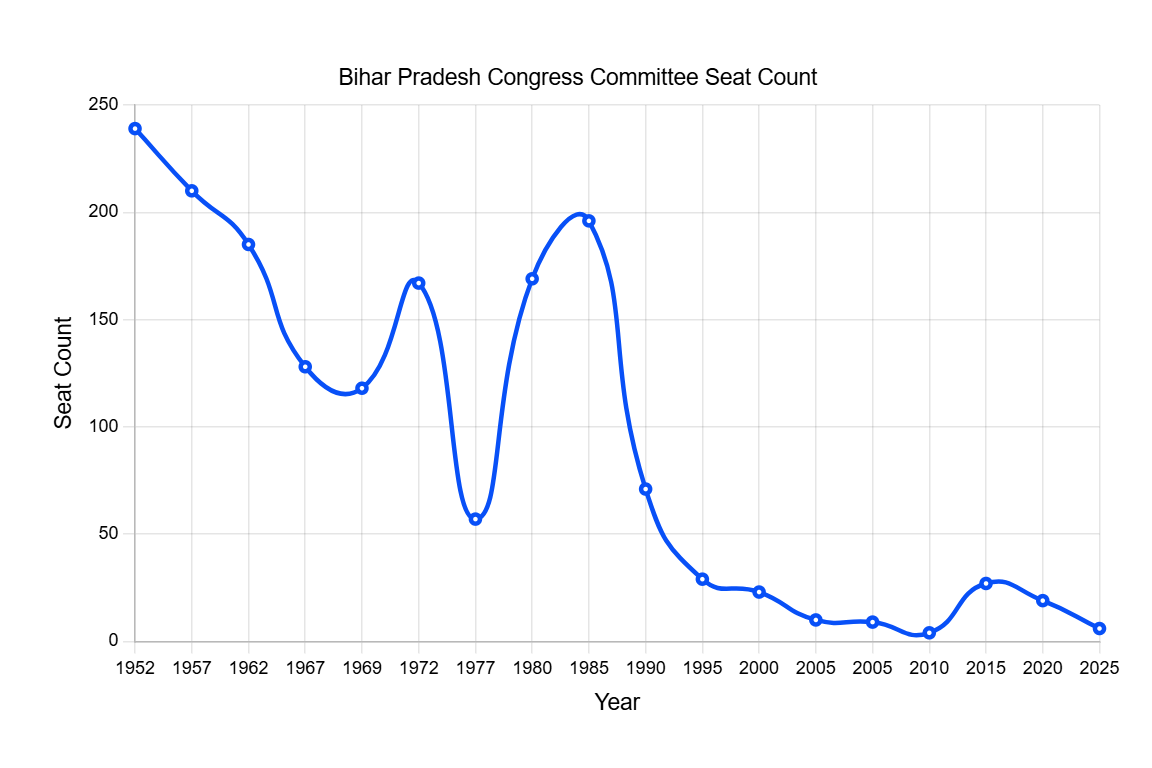
All time seat count of the Indian National Congress in Bihar.

Year	Legislature	Leader	Seats Contested	Seats won	Change in seats	Votes	Percentage of votes	Vote swing	Outcome
1952	1st Assembly	Shri Krishna Sinha	322	239 / 330	New	39,51,145	41.38%	New	Government
1957	2nd Assembly	Shri Krishna Sinha	312	210 / 318	▼29	44,55,425	42.09%	▲0.71%	Government
1962	3rd Assembly	Binodanand Jha	318	185 / 318	▼25	40,75,844	41.35%	▼0.74%	Government
1967	4th Assembly	K. B. Sahay	318	128 / 318	▼57	44,79,460	33.09%	▼8.26%	Opposition
1969	5th Assembly	Harihar Singh	318	118 / 318	▼10	45,70,413	30.46%	▼2.63%	Government
1972	6th Assembly	Kedar Pandey	259	167 / 318	▲49	56,88,002	33.12%	▲2.66%	Government
1977	7th Assembly	Jagannath Mishra	286	57 / 324	▼110	41,01,522	23.58%	▼9.54%	Opposition
1980	8th Assembly	Jagannath Mishra	311	169 / 324	▲112	76,90,225	34.2%	▲10.62%	Government
1985	9th Assembly	Bindeshwari Dubey	323	196 / 324	▲27	95,58,562	39.3%	▲5.1%	Government
1990	10th Assembly	Jagannath Mishra	323	71 / 324	▼125	79,46,635	24.78%	▼14.52%	Opposition
1995	11th Assembly	Jagannath Mishra	320	29 / 324	▼42	56,22,952	16.27%	▼8.51%	Opposition
2000	12th Assembly	Shakeel Ahmad	324	23 / 324	▼6	40,96,467	11.06%	▼5.21%	Opposition
2005	13th Assembly	Ramjatan Sinha	84	10 / 243	▼13	14,35,449	5.00%	▼6.06%	Opposition
2005	14th Assembly	Sadanand Singh	51	9 / 243	▼1	12,28,835	6.09%	▲1.09%	Opposition
2010	15th Bihar Assembly	Mehboob Ali Kaiser	243	4 / 243	▼5	24,31,477	8.37%	▲3.37%	Opposition
2015	16th Bihar Assembly	Ashok Choudhary	41	27 / 243	▲23	25,39,638	6.66%	▼1.71%	Opposition
2020	17th Bihar Assembly	Madan Mohan Jha	70	19 / 243	▼8	39,95,319	9.48%	▲2.82%	Opposition
2025	18th Bihar Assembly		36	6 / 243	▼13		8.71%	▼0.77%	Opposition

==== Lok Sabha elections ====
Year	General election	Votes polled	Seats won	Change
1951	1st Lok Sabha	4,573,058	45	New
1957	2nd Lok Sabha	4,450,208	41	▼4
1962	3rd Lok Sabha	4,365,148	39	▼2
1967	4th Lok Sabha	4,749,813	34	▼5
1971	5th Lok Sabha	5,967,512	39	▲5
1977	6th Lok Sabha	4,781,142	0	▼39
1980	7th Lok Sabha	7,377,583	30	▲30
1984	8th Lok Sabha	12,970,432	48	▲18
1989	9th Lok Sabha	8,659,832	4	▼44
1991	10th Lok Sabha	7,007,304	1	▼3
1996	11th Lok Sabha	4,446,053	2	▲1
1998	12th Lok Sabha	2,717,204	5	▲3
1999	13th Lok Sabha	3,142,603	4	▼1
2004	14th Lok Sabha	1,315,935	3	▼1
2009	15th Lok Sabha	2,550,785	2	▼1
2014	16th Lok Sabha	30,21,065	2	–
2019	17th Lok Sabha	31,40,797	1	▼1
2024	18th Lok Sabha	3,983,882	4	▲3

=== Chandigarh ===
General Election

Year	General Election	Votes Polled	Seats Won	Seat Contested	Total Seats
1967	4th Lok Sabha	11,323	0	1	1
1971	5th Lok Sabha	48,335	1	1	1
1977	6th Lok Sabha	30,382	0	1	1
1980	7th Lok Sabha	61,624	1	1	1
1984	8th Lok Sabha	103,090	1	1	1
1989	9th Lok Sabha	87,238	0	1	1
1991	10th Lok Sabha	76,628	1	1	1
1996	11th Lok Sabha	77,168	0	1	1
1998	12th Lok Sabha	1,09,421	0	1	1
1999	13th Lok Sabha	1,32,924	1	1	1
2004	14th Lok Sabha	1,39,880	1	1	1
2009	14th Lok Sabha	1,61,042	1	1	1
2014	16th Lok Sabha	1,21,720	0	1	1
2019	17th Lok Sabha	1,84,218	0	1	1
2024	18th Lok Sabha	216,657	1	1	1

=== Chhattisgarh ===
==== Legislative Assembly Elections ====
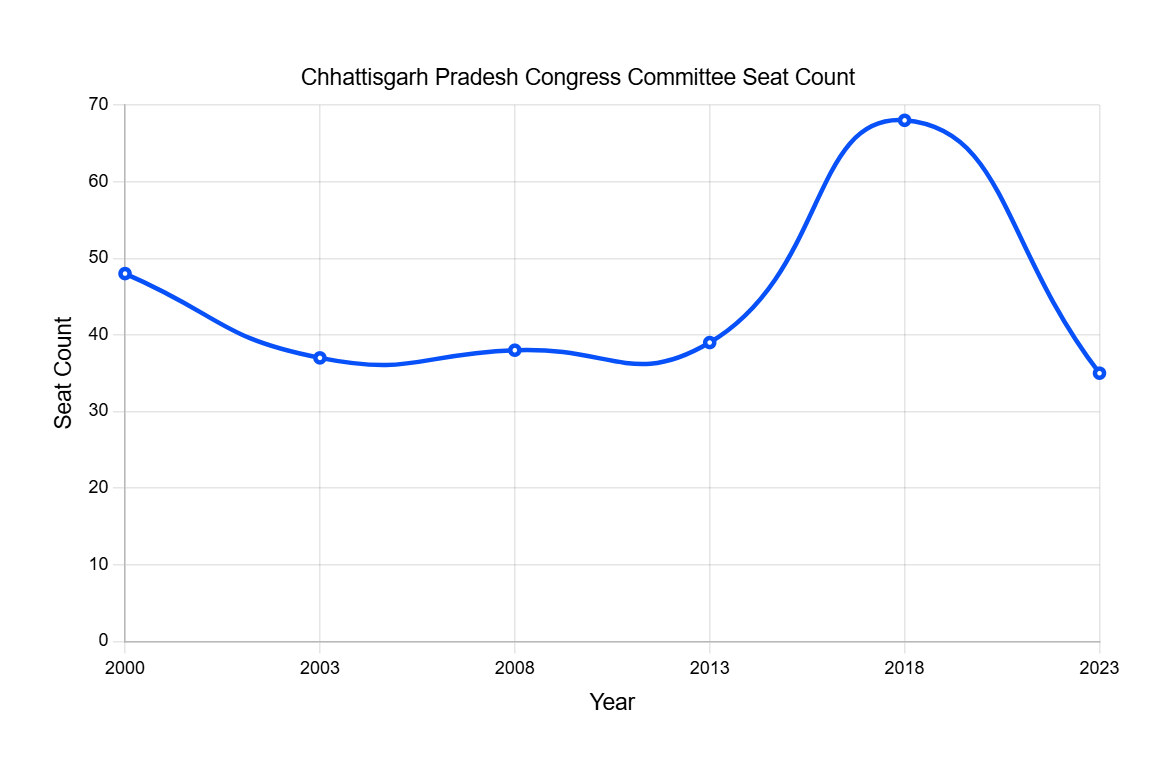
All time seat count of the Indian National Congress in Chhattisgarh.

Year	Assembly Election	Votes Polled	Votes percent	Seats Contested	Seat Won	Seat Change	Outcome
2000	1st Assembly	Constituted on the basis of the M.P. Assembly Elections 1998	N.A.	90	48 / 90	▲48	Government
2003	2nd Assembly	3,543,754	36.71	90	37 / 90	▼11	Opposition
2008	3rd Assembly	4,146,853	38.62	87	38 / 90	▲1	Opposition
2013	4th Assembly	5,267,698	40.3	90	39 / 90	▲1	Opposition
2018	5th Assembly	6,136,429	43.0	90	68 / 90	▲29	Government
2023	6th Assembly	6,602,586	42.23	90	35 / 90	▼33	Opposition

==== General Elections ====
Year	General Election	Votes Polled	Seats Won	Seat Contested	Total Seats
2004	14th Lok Sabha	2,869,260	1	11	11
2009	15th Lok Sabha	-	1	11	11
2014	16th Lok Sabha	-	1	11	11
2019	17th Lok Sabha	5,569,283	2	11	11
2024	18th Lok Sabha	61,68,408	1	11	11

=== Dadra and Nagar Haveli ===
General Elections

Year	General Election	Votes Polled	Seats Won	Seat Contested	Total Seats
1967	4th Lok Sabha	10,654	1	1	1
1971	5th Lok Sabha	8,484	1	1	1
1977	6th Lok Sabha	11,324	1	1	1
1980	7th Lok Sabha	19,277	1	1	1
1984	8th Lok Sabha	15,471	0	1	1
1989	9th Lok Sabha	14,875	0	1	1
1991	10th Lok Sabha	29,907	1	1	1
1996	11th Lok Sabha	39,384	1	1	1
1998	12th Lok Sabha	2,997	0	1	1
1999	13th Lok Sabha	10,601	0	1	1
2004	14th Lok Sabha	21,772	0	1	1
2009	15th Lok Sabha	50,624	0	1	1
2014	16th Lok Sabha	74,576	0	1	1
2019	17th Lok Sabha	8,608	0	1	1
2024	18th Lok Sabha	63,490	0	1	1

=== Daman and Diu ===
==== General Elections ====
Year	General Election	Votes Polled	Seats Won	Seat Contested	Total Seats
1989	9th Lok Sabha	13,807	0	1	1
1991	10th Lok Sabha	8,623	0	1	1
1996	11th Lok Sabha	24,543	1	1	1
1998	12th Lok Sabha	1,020	0	1	1
1999	13th Lok Sabha	25,136	1	1	1
2004	14th Lok Sabha	27,523	1	1	1
2009	15th Lok Sabha	19,708	0	1	1
2014	16th Lok Sabha	37,738	0	1	1
2019	17th Lok Sabha	27,655	0	1	1
2024	18th Lok Sabha	11,258	0	1	1

=== Delhi ===
==== Legislative Assembly Elections ====
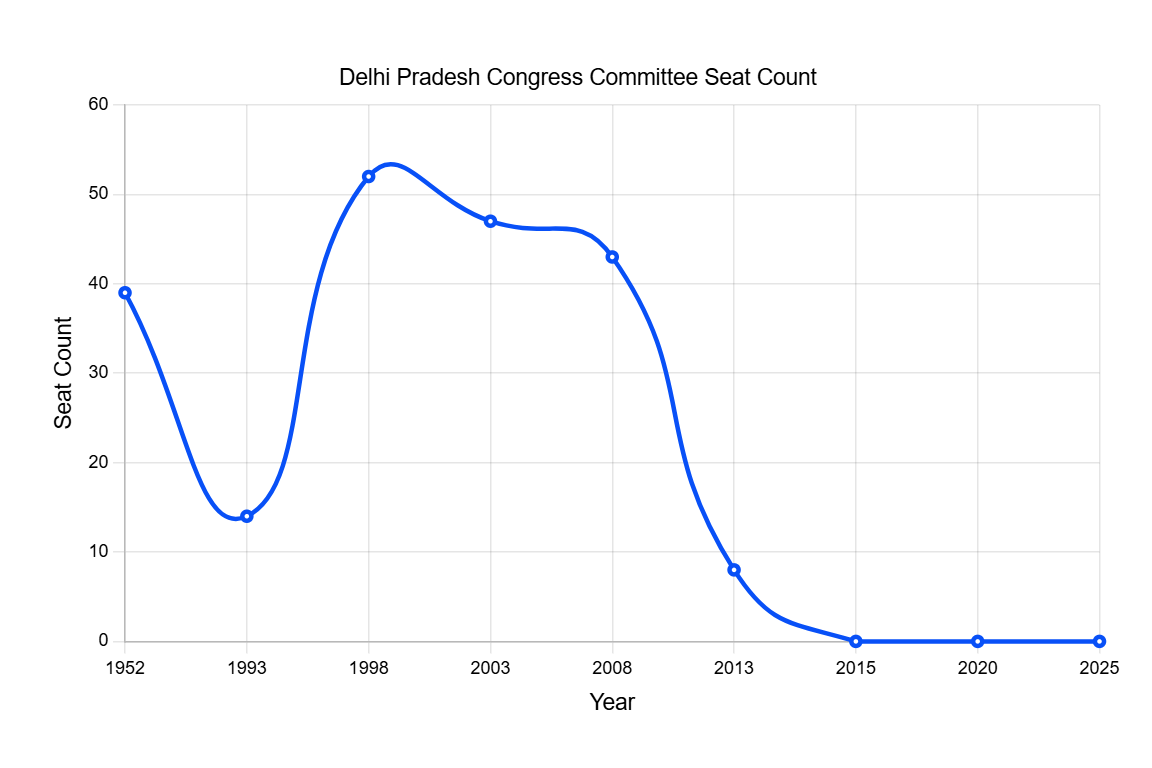
All time seat count of the Indian National Congress in Delhi.

Year	Assembly Election	Votes Polled	Seats Won	Seat Contested	Total Seats
1952	Interim Assembly	271,812	39	47	48
1993	1st Delhi Assembly	1,224,361	14	70	70
1998	2nd Delhi Assembly	1,952,071	52	70	70
2003	3rd Delhi Assembly	2,172,062	47	70	70
2008	4th Delhi Assembly	-	43	70	70
2013	5th Delhi Assembly	1,932,933	8	70	70
2015	6th Delhi Assembly	867,027	0	70	70
2020	7th Delhi Assembly	395,958	0	66	70
2025	8th Delhi Assembly	601,922	0	70	70

==== General Elections ====
Year	General Election	Votes Polled	Seats Won	Seat Contested	Total Seats
1951	1st Lok Sabha	324,214	3	5	5
1957	2nd Lok Sabha	440,775	5	5	5
1962	3rd Lok Sabha	453,174	5	5	5
1967	4th Lok Sabha	434,937	1	-	7
1971	5th Lok Sabha	835,673	7	7	7
1977	6th Lok Sabha	542,145	0	-	7
1980	7th Lok Sabha	990,004	6	7	7
1984	8th Lok Sabha	1,528,252	7	7	7
1989	9th Lok Sabha	1,322,876	2	-	7
1991	10th Lok Sabha	1,152,627	2	-	7
1996	11th Lok Sabha	1,499,128	2	7	7
1998	12th Lok Sabha	1,798,165	1	7	7
1999	13th Lok Sabha	1,591,682	0	7	7
2004	14th Lok Sabha	2,261,199	6	7	7
2009	15th Lok Sabha	3,285,353	7	7	7
2014	16th Lok Sabha	1,253,078	0	7	7
2019	17th Lok Sabha	1,953,900	0	7	7
2024	18th Lok Sabha	16,85,494	0	3	7

=== Goa ===
==== Legislative Assembly Elections ====
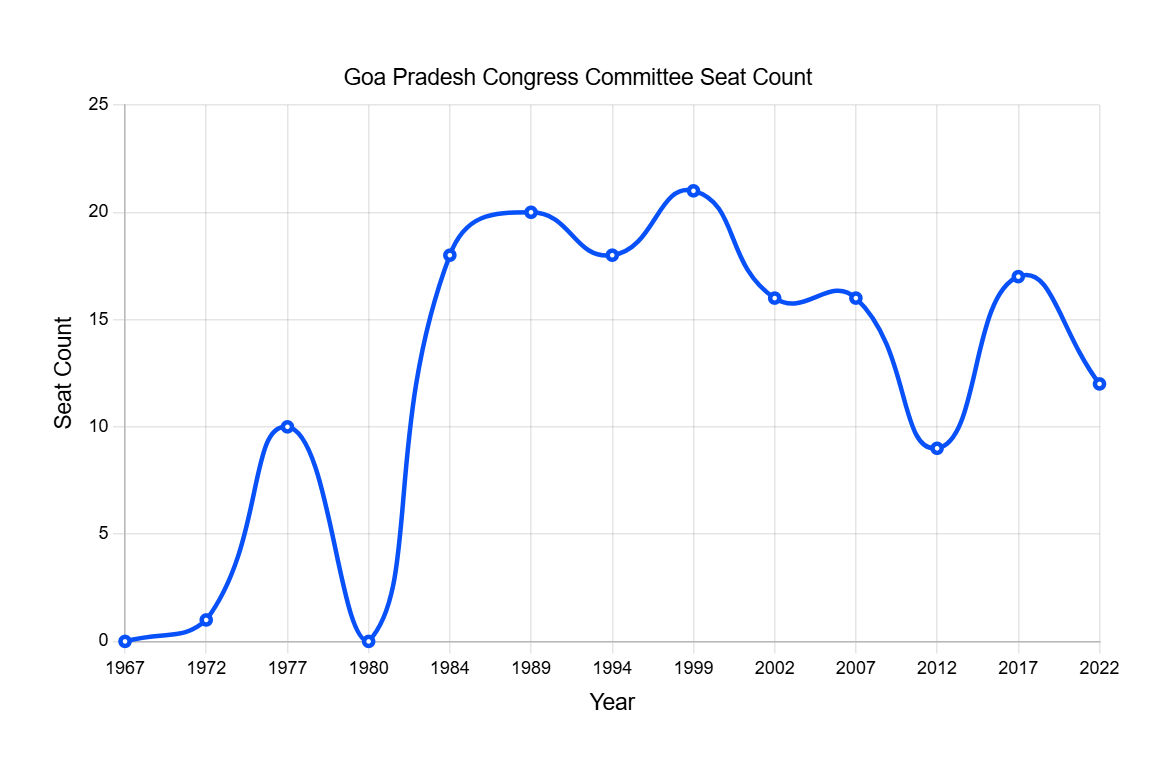
All time seat count of the Indian National Congress in Goa.

Year	General Election	Votes Polled	Seats Won	Seat Contested	Total Seats
Goa, Daman and Diu
1967	1st Assembly	Didn't Contest	-	-	30
1972	2nd Assembly	41,612	1	19	30
1977	3rd Assembly	87,461	10	27	30
1980	4th Assembly	12,338	0	-	30
1984	5th Assembly	160,944	18	-	30
Goa
1989	1st Assembly	204,321	20	-	40
1994	2nd Assembly	216,165	18	-	40
1999	3rd Assembly	222,747	21	-	40
2002	4th Assembly	244,478	16	-	40
2007	5th Assembly	-	16	32	40
2012	6th Assembly	-	9	34	40
2017	7th Assembly	259,758	17	-	40
2022	8th Assembly		12	-	40

==== General Elections ====
Year	General Election	Votes Polled	Seats Won	Seat Contested	Total Seats
Goa, Daman and Diu
1967	4th Lok Sabha	15,205	0	2	2
1971	5th Lok Sabha	57,627	1	2	2
1977	6th Lok Sabha	117,150	1	2	2
1980	7th Lok Sabha	43,030	0	2	2
1984	8th Lok Sabha	188,779	2	2	2
Goa
1989	9th Lok Sabha	198,100	1	2	2
1991	10th Lok Sabha	181,434	1	2	2
1996	11th Lok Sabha	165,857	0	2	2
1998	12th Lok Sabha	168,314	2	2	2
1999	13th Lok Sabha	159,844	0	2	2
2004	14th Lok Sabha	164,432	1	2	2
2009	15th Lok Sabha	-	1	2	2
2014	16th Lok Sabha	-	0	2	2
2019	17th Lok Sabha	3,66,158	1	2	2
2024	18th Lok Sabha	356,213	1	2	2

=== Gujarat ===
==== Legislative Assembly Elections ====
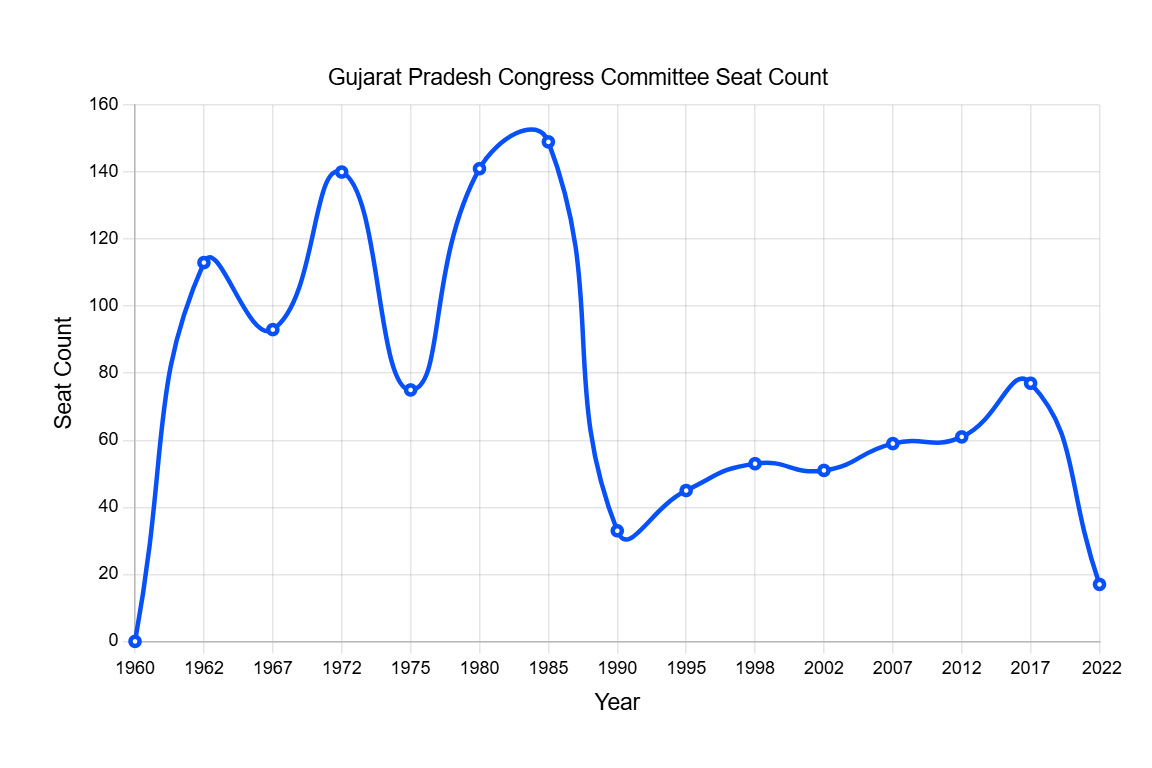
All time seat count of the Indian National Congress in Gujarat.

Year	Assembly Election	Votes Polled	Vote Percent	Seat Contested	Seats Won	Seat Change	Outcome
1960	1st Assembly	Constituted out of Bombay assembly (Polls held in 1957)	N.A.	N.A.	N.A.	N.A.	Government
1962	2nd Assembly	2,646,286	50.84%	N.A.	113 / 154	N.A.	Government
1967	3rd Assembly	2,933,059	45.96%	N.A.	93 / 168	▼20	Government, later Opposition
1972	4th Assembly	3,527,035	50.93	N.A.	140 / 168	▲47	Government
1975	5th Assembly	3,280,514	40.70	N.A.	75 / 182	▼65	Opposition, briefly back in govt and later in oppn again
1980	6th Assembly	3,971,238	51.04%	N.A.	141 / 182	▲66	Government
1985	7th Assembly	5,122,753	55.55%	N.A.	149 / 182	▲8	Government
1990	8th Assembly	3,899,159	30.74%	N.A.	33 / 182	▼116	Opposition, later Government
1995	9th Assembly	5,930,216	32.86%	N.A.	45 / 182	▲12	Opposition, later Government
1998	10th Assembly	5,677,386	34.85%	N.A.	53 / 182	▲8	Opposition
2002	11th Assembly	8,033,104	39.28%	N.A.	51 / 182	▼2	Opposition
2007	12th Assembly	8,309,450	38.00%	N.A.	59 / 182	▲8	Opposition
2012	13th Assembly	10,674,767	38.93%	N.A.	61 / 182	▲2	Opposition
2017	14th Assembly	12,438,937	41.4%	N.A.	77 / 182	▲16	Opposition
2022	15th Assembly	8,683,966	27.28%	179	17 / 182	▼60	Opposition

=== Haryana ===
==== Legislative Assembly Elections ====
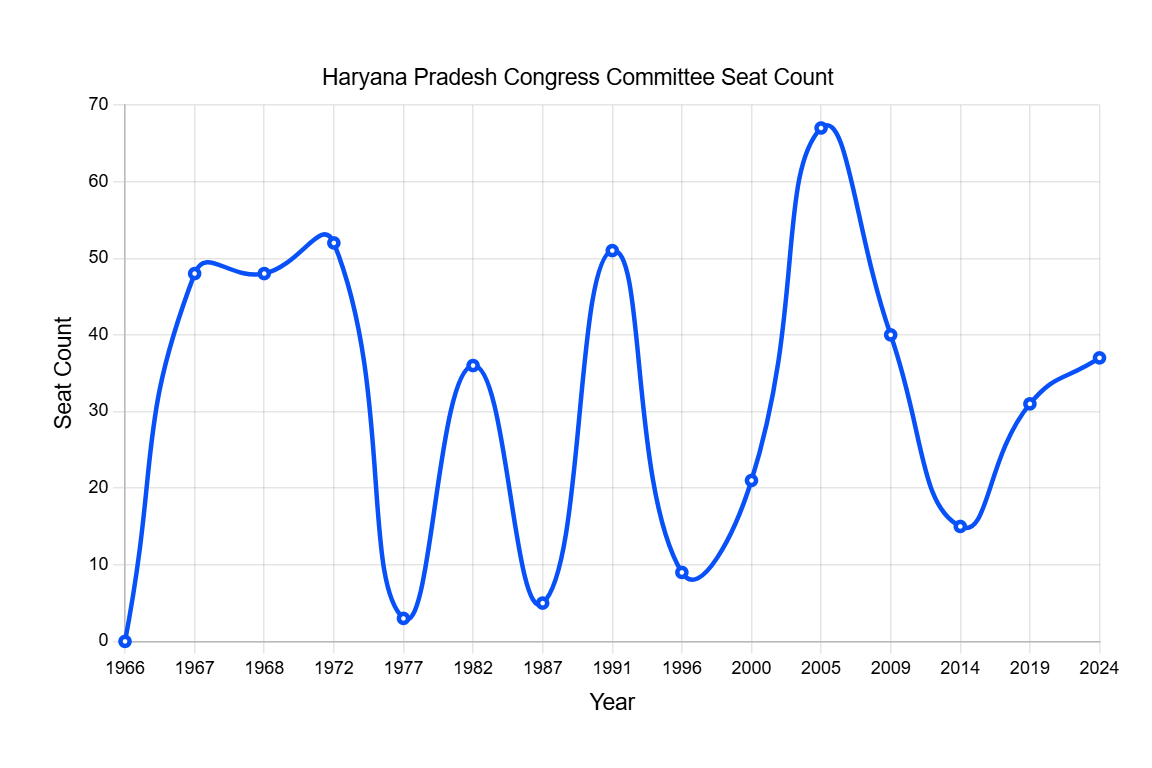
All time seat count of the Indian National Congress in Haryana.

Year	Assembly Election	Votes Polled	Seats Won	Seat Contested	Total Seats
1966	1st Assembly	Constituted out of Punjab assembly			
1967	2nd Assembly	1,252,290	48		81
1968	3rd Assembly	1,114,176	48		81
1972	4th Assembly	1,639,405	52		81
1977	5th Assembly	648,422	3		90
1982	6th Assembly	1,845,297	36		90
1987	7th Assembly	1,776,820	5		90
1991	8th Assembly	2,084,856	51	90	90
1996	9th Assembly	1,576,882	9		90
2000	10th Assembly	2,388,950	21	90	90
2005	11th Assembly	3,889,125	67	90	90
2009	12th Assembly	-	40	90	90
2014	13th Assembly	-	15		90
2019	14th Assembly		31	90	90
2024	15th Assembly		37	90	90

==== General Elections ====
Year	General Election	Votes Polled	Seats Won	Seat Contested	Total Seats
1967	4th Lok Sabha	1,344,830	7		9
1971	5th Lok Sabha	1,572,929	7		9
1977	6th Lok Sabha	744,862	0		10
1980	7th Lok Sabha	1,426,261	5		10
1984	8th Lok Sabha	2,787,655	10	10	10
1989	9th Lok Sabha	2,816,831	4		10
1991	10th Lok Sabha	2,310,003	9		10
1996	11th Lok Sabha	1,723,087	2		10
1998	12th Lok Sabha	1,965,397	3		10
1999	13th Lok Sabha	2,435,752	0		10
2004	14th Lok Sabha	3,409,950	9	10	10
2009	15th Lok Sabha	-	9	10	10
2014	16th Lok Sabha	2,634,905	1	10	10
2019	17th Lok Sabha	36,04,106	0	10	10
2024	18th Lok Sabha		5	10	10

=== Himachal Pradesh ===
==== Legislative Assembly Elections ====
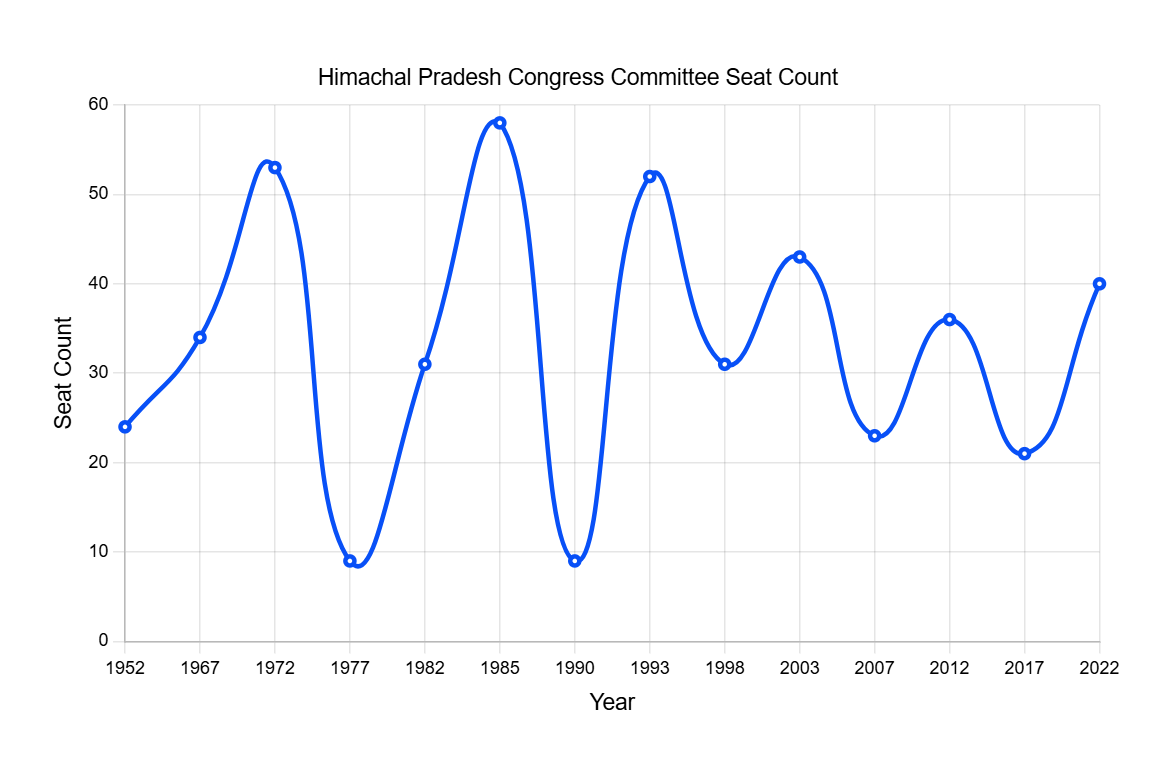
All time seat count of the Indian National Congress in Himachal Pradesh.

Year	Assembly Election	Votes Polled	Seats Won	Seat Change	Outcome
1952	1st Assembly	84,819	24 / 36	New	Government
1967	2nd Assembly	323,247	34 / 60	▲10	Government
1972	3rd Assembly	467,592	53 / 68	▲19	Government
1977	4th Assembly	314,780	9 / 68	▼44	Opposition
1982	5th Assembly	659,239	31 / 68	▲22	Government
1985	6th Assembly	910,053	58 / 68	▲27	Government
1990	7th Assembly	750,885	9 / 68	▼49	Opposition
1993	8th Assembly	1,135,203	52 / 68	▲43	Government
1998	9th Assembly	1,110,055	31 / 68	▼21	Opposition
2003	10th Assembly	1,251,414	43 / 68	▲12	Government
2007	11th Assembly	1,252,955	23 / 68	▼20	Opposition
2012	12th Assembly	1,447,319	36 / 68	▲13	Government
2017	13th Assembly	1,577,450	21 / 68	▼15	Opposition
2022	14th Assembly	1,852,504	40 / 68	▲19	Government

==== General Elections ====
Year	General Election	Votes Polled	Seats Won	Seat Change	Outcome
1951	1st Lok Sabha	117,036	3	▲3	Government
1957	2nd Lok Sabha	171,591	4	▲1	Government
1962	3rd Lok Sabha	166,749	4	Steady	Government
1967	4th Lok Sabha	375,578	6	▲2	Government (1967–69), Coalition (1969–71)
1971	5th Lok Sabha	516,959	4	▼2	Government
1977	6th Lok Sabha	439,398	0	▼4	Opposition
1980	7th Lok Sabha	653,018	4	▲4	Government
1984	8th Lok Sabha	942,657	4	Steady	Government
1989	9th Lok Sabha	789,804	1	▼3	Opposition
1991	10th Lok Sabha	808,659	2	▲1	Government
1996	11th Lok Sabha	1,097,007	4	▲2	Opposition, later outside support for UF
1998	12th Lok Sabha	997,410	1	▼3	Opposition
1999	13th Lok Sabha	843,225	0	▼1	Opposition
2004	14th Lok Sabha	1,294,988	3	▲3	Coalition
2009	15th Lok Sabha	1,226,933	1	▼2	Coalition
2014	16th Lok Sabha	1,260,477	0	▼1	Opposition
2019	17th Lok Sabha	10,51,113	0	Steady	Opposition
2024	18th Lok Sabha	16,66,322	0	Steady	Opposition

=== Jammu and Kashmir ===
==== Legislative Assembly Elections ====
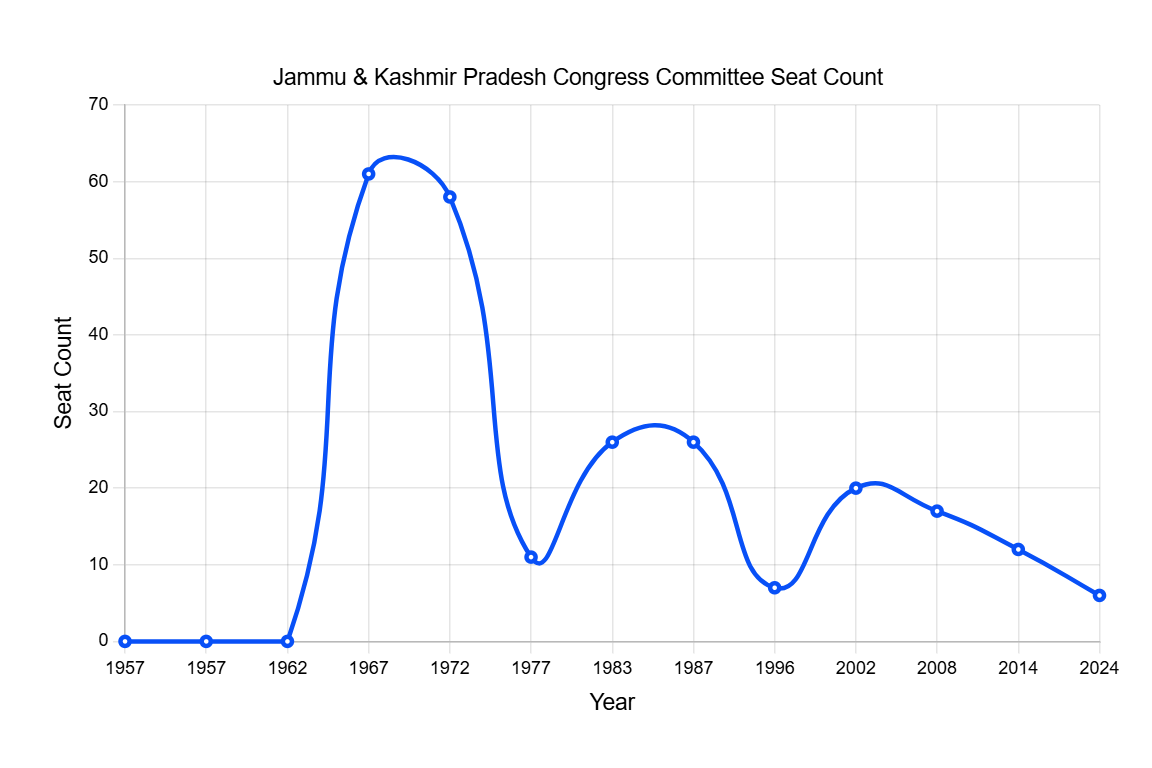
All time seat count of the Indian National Congress in J&K.

Year	General Election	Votes Polled	Seats Won	Seat Contested	Total Seats
Jammu and Kashmir State
1957	Constituent Assembly				
1957	1st Assembly	Didn't Contest			75
1962	2nd Assembly	Didn't Contest			75
1967	3rd Assembly	423,922	61		75
1972	4th Assembly	764,492	58		75
1977	5th Assembly	294,911	11		76
1983	6th Assembly	666,112	26		76
1987	7th Assembly	525,261	26		76
1996	8th Assembly	496,628	7		87
2002	9th Assembly	643,751	20		87
2008	10th Assembly	-	17		87
2014	11th Assembly	867,883	12		87
Jammu and Kashmir Union Territory
2024	12th Assembly	6,82,666	6		90

==== General Elections ====
Year	General Election	Votes Polled	Seats Won	Seat Contested	Total Seats
Jammu and Kashmir State
1967	4th Lok Sabha	425,668	5		6
1971	5th Lok Sabha	630,690	5		6
1977	6th Lok Sabha	233,144	3		6
1980	7th Lok Sabha	249,760	1		6
1984	8th Lok Sabha	661,435	3		6
1989	9th Lok Sabha	407,474	2		6
1991	10th Lok Sabha	No Elections			
1996	11th Lok Sabha	569,942	4		6
1998	12th Lok Sabha	415,354	1		6
1999	13th Lok Sabha	280,065	0		6
2004	14th Lok Sabha	623,182	2		6
2009	15th Lok Sabha	-	2		6
2014	16th Lok Sabha	-	0		6
2019	17th Lok Sabha	10,11,527	0	5	6
Jammu and Kashmir Union Territory
2024	18th Lok Sabha	9,90,182	0	2	5

=== Jharkhand ===
==== Legislative Assembly Elections ====
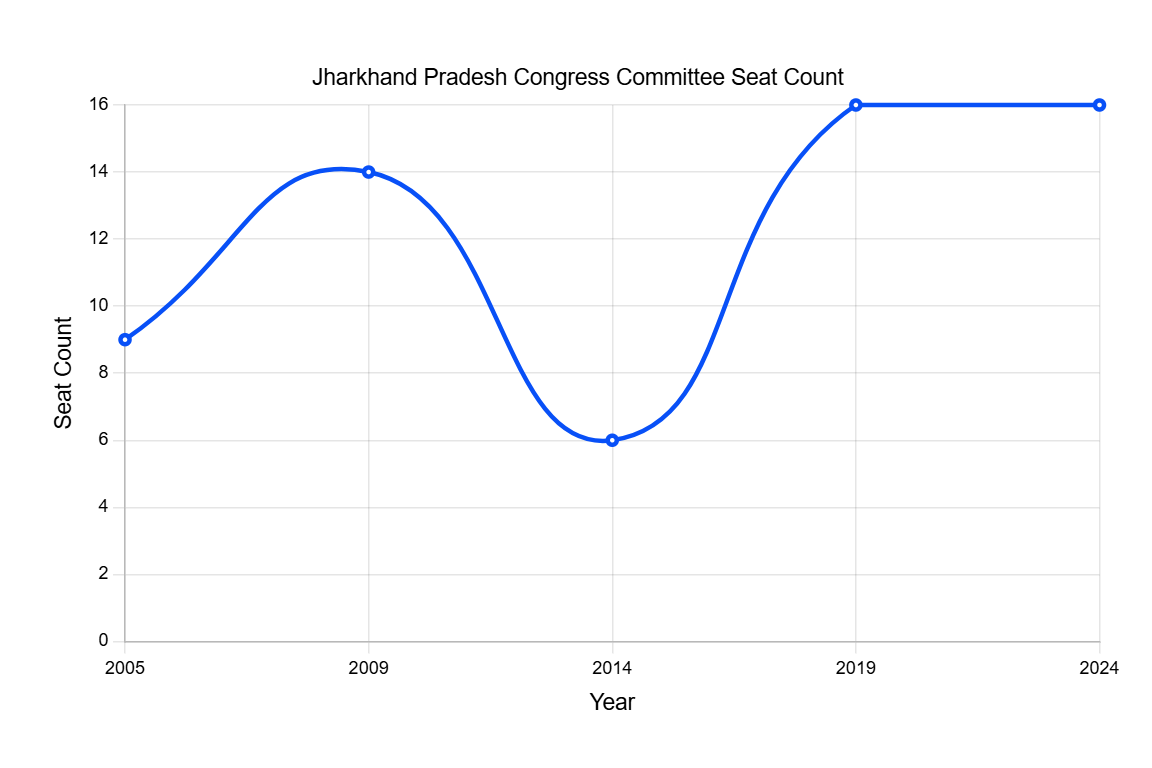
All time seat count of the Indian National Congress in Jharkhand.

Year	General Election	Votes Polled	Seats Won	Seat Contested	Total Seats
2000	1st Jharkhand Assembly	Constituted on the Basis of the Bihar Legislative Assembly Elections 2000.			81
2005	2nd Jharkhand Assembly	1,220,498	9	41	81
2009	3rd Jharkhand Assembly	1,660,977	14	-	81
2014	4th Jharkhand Assembly	1,450,640	6	62	81
2019	5th Jharkhand Assembly	2,088,863	16	31	81
2024	6th Jharkhand Assembly	2,776,805	16	30	81

==== General Elections ====
Year	General Election	Votes Polled	Seats Won	Seat Contested	Total Seats
2004	14th Lok Sabha	2,007,334	6	-	14
2009	15th Lok Sabha	-	1	-	14
2014	16th Lok Sabha	-	0	-	14
2019	17th Lok Sabha	23,38,538	1	9	14
2024	18th Lok Sabha	33,19,345	2	7	14

=== Karnataka ===
==== Legislative Assembly Elections ====
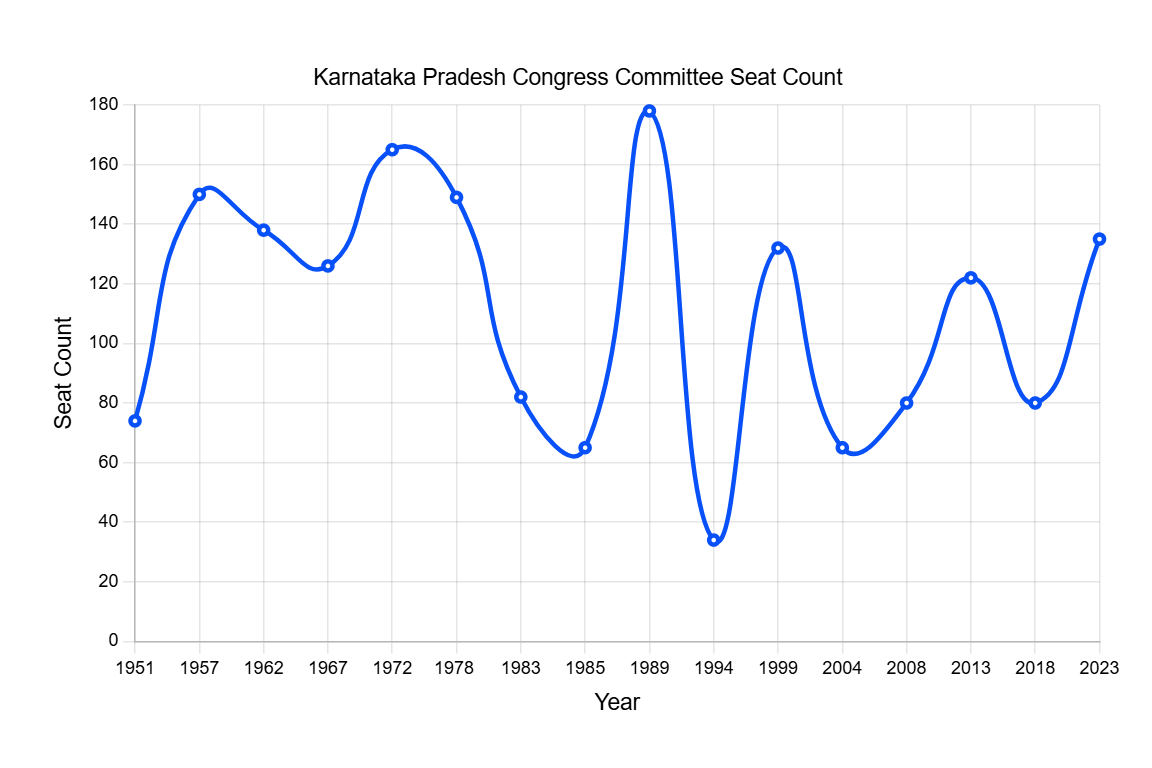
All time seat count of the Indian National Congress in Karnataka.

As Mysore

Year	General Election	Votes Polled	Vote Percent	Seat Contested	Seats Won	Seat Change	Outcome
1951	1st Assembly	1,276,318	N.A.	99	74 / 99	▲74	Government
1957	2nd Assembly	3,343,839	N.A.	207	150 / 208	▲76	Government
1962	3rd Assembly	3,164,811	N.A.	N.A.	138 / 208	▼12	Government
1967	4th Assembly	3,636,374	N.A.	N.A.	126 / 216	▼12	Government
1972	5th Assembly	4,698,824	N.A.	N.A.	165 / 216	▲39	Government

As Karnataka

Year	General Election	Votes Polled	Vote Percent	Seat Contested	Seats Won	Seat Change	Outcome
1978	6th Assembly	5,543,756	44.25%	214	149 / 224	▼16	Government
1983	7th Assembly	5,221,419	40.42% (▼3.83%)	221	82 / 224	▼67	Opposition
1985	8th Assembly	6,009,461	40.82% (▲0.4%)	223	65 / 224	▼2	Opposition
1989	9th Assembly	7,990,142	43.76% (▲3.34%)	221	178 / 224	▲113	Government
1994	10th Assembly	5,580,473	29.95% (▼13.81%)	221	34 / 224	▼144	Opposition
1999	11th Assembly	9,077,815	40.84%(▲10.89%)	222	132 / 224	▲98	Government
2004	12th Assembly	8,861,959	35.27% (▲5.57%)	224	65 / 224	▼67	2 Years Coalition Government with JDS
2008	13th Assembly	N.A.	35.13% (▼0.14%)	N.A.	80 / 224	▲15	Opposition
2013	14th Assembly	11,473,025	36.6% (▲1.8%)	223	122 / 224	▲42	Government
2018	15th Assembly	13,986,526	38.14% (▲1.4%)	N.A.	80 / 224	▼42	Coalition Government With JDS, Later Opposition
2023	16th Assembly	16,789,272	42.88% (▲4.74%)	223	135 / 224	▲55	Government

==== General Elections ====
As Mysore

Year	General Election	Votes Polled	Seats Won	Seat Contested	Total Seats
1951	1st Lok Sabha	1,509,075	10	-	11
1957	2nd Lok Sabha	3,219,014	23	-	26
1962	3rd Lok Sabha	3,381,276	25	-	26
1967	4th Lok Sabha	3,755,339	18	-	27
1971	5th Lok Sabha	5,418,541	27	27	27

As Karnataka

Year	General Election	Votes Polled	Seats Won	Seat Contested	Total Seats
1977	6th Lok Sabha	5,833,567	26	-	28
1980	7th Lok Sabha	6,154,746	27	-	28
1984	8th Lok Sabha	6,974,044	24	-	28
1989	9th Lok Sabha	9,008,980	27	28	28
1991	10th Lok Sabha	6,490,020	23	-	28
1996	11th Lok Sabha	5,668,988	5	-	28
1998	12th Lok Sabha	7,642,756	9	-	28
1999	13th Lok Sabha	10,150,765	18	-	28
2004	14th Lok Sabha	9,247,605	8	-	28
2009	15th Lok Sabha	N.A.	6	-	28
2014	16th Lok Sabha	N.A.	9	-	28
2019	17th Lok Sabha	1,12,03,016	1	20	28
2024	18th Lok Sabha		8	28	28

=== Kerala ===
==== Legislative Assembly Elections ====
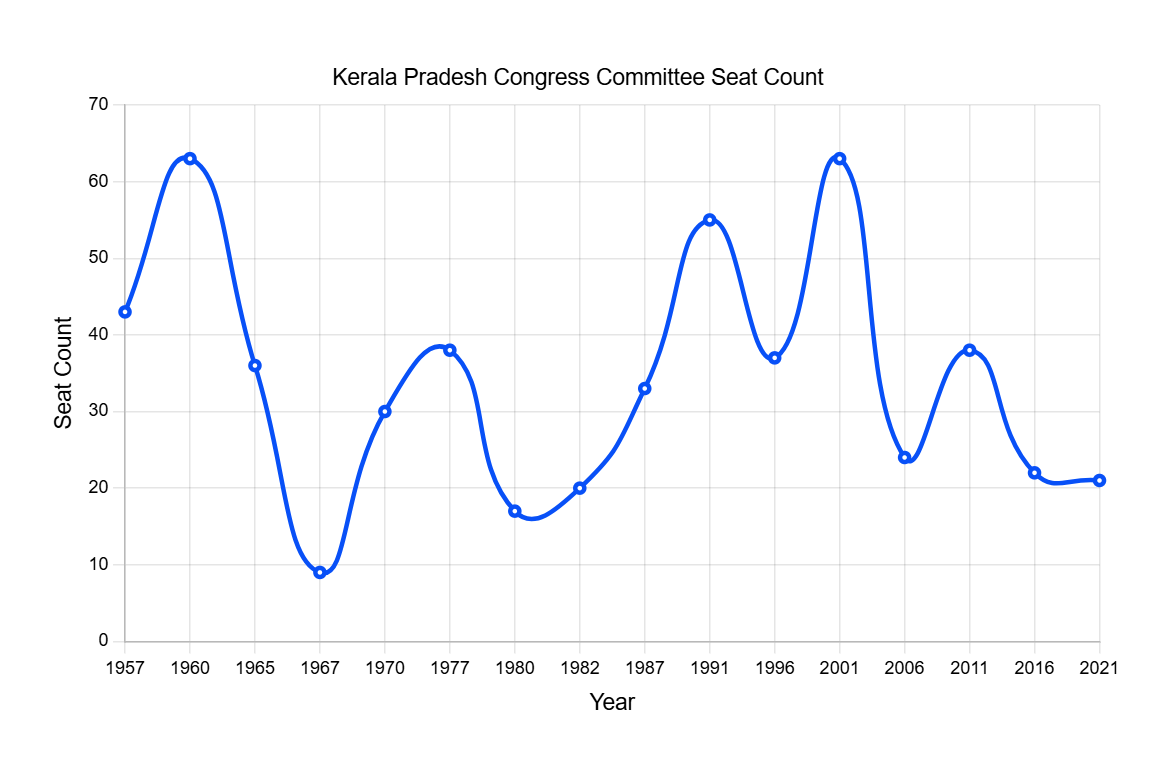
All time seat count of the Indian National Congress in Kerala.

As Travancore-Cochin

Year	General Election	Votes Polled	Seats Won	Seat Contested	Total Seats
1951	1st Assembly	1,204,364	44	105	108
1954	2nd Assembly	1,762,820	45	115	117

As Kerala

Year	General Election	Votes Polled	Seats	Seat Contested	Seat Change	Result
1957	1st Assembly	2,209,251	43 / 126	124	--	Opposition
1960	2nd Assembly	2,789,556	63 / 126	80	▼20	Government
1965	3rd Assembly	2,123,660	36 / 133	133	▼27	Hung Assembly
1967	3rd Assembly	2,225,026	9 / 133	133	▼27	Opposition
1970	4th Assembly	1,327,270	30 / 133	-	▲21	Government
1977	5th Assembly	1,755,882	38 / 140	-	▲8	Government
1980	6th Assembly	1,624,446	17 / 140	-	▼21	Opposition
1982	7th Assembly	1,137,632	20 / 140	36	▲3	Government
1987	8th Assembly	3,164,409	33 / 140	76	▲13	Opposition
1991	9th Assembly	4,546,379	55 / 140	91	▲22	Government
1996	10th Assembly	4,340,717	37 / 140	94	▼18	Opposition
2001	11th Assembly	4,940,883	63 / 140	88	▲25	Government
2006	12th Assembly	3,744,784	24 / 140	-	▼47	Opposition
2011	13th Assembly	4,667,520	38 / 140	82	▲14	Government
2016	14th Assembly	4,794,793	22 / 140	87	▼17	Opposition
2021	15th Assembly	5,233,429	21 / 140	93	▼1	Opposition
2026	16th Assembly	6,217,918	63 / 140	92	▲41	Government

==== General Elections ====
As Travancore-Cochin

Year	General Election	Votes Polled	Seats Won	Seat Contested	Total Seats
1951	1st Lok Sabha	1,224,533	6		

Kerala

Year	General Election	Votes Polled	Seats Won	Seat Contested	Total Seats
1957	2nd Lok Sabha	2,102,883	6		
1962	3rd Lok Sabha	1,895,226	6		
1967	4th Lok Sabha	2,267,393	1		
1971	5th Lok Sabha	1,289,601	6		
1977	6th Lok Sabha	2,579,745	11		
1980	7th Lok Sabha	2,150,186	5		
1984	8th Lok Sabha	3,624,315	13		
1989	9th Lok Sabha	6,218,850	14		
1991	10th Lok Sabha	5,526,187	13		
1996	11th Lok Sabha	5,467,132	7		
1998	12th Lok Sabha	5,746,566	8		
1999	13th Lok Sabha	6,051,905	8		
2004	14th Lok Sabha	4,846,637	0	17	20
2009	15th Lok Sabha	6,434,486	13	-	20
2014	16th Lok Sabha	5,590,285	8	15	20
2019	17th Lok Sabha	7,596,610	15	16	20
2024	18th Lok Sabha		14	16	20

=== Ladakh ===
==== General Elections ====
Year	General Election	Votes Polled	Seats Won	Seat Contested	Total Seats
Ladakh Union Territory
2024	18th Lok Sabha	37,397	0	1	1

=== Lakshadweep ===
General Election

Year	General Election	Votes Polled	Seats Won	Seat Contested	Total Seats
1967	4th Lok Sabha	Didn't Contest			1
1971	5th Lok Sabha	Candidate Elected Unopposed	1	1	1
1977	6th Lok Sabha	9,600	1	1	1
1980	7th Lok Sabha	685	0	1	1
1984	8th Lok Sabha	10,361	1	1	1
1989	9th Lok Sabha	13,323	1	1	1
1991	10th Lok Sabha	12,801	1	1	1
1996	11th Lok Sabha	15,611	1	1	1
1998	12th Lok Sabha	16,014	1	1	1
1999	13th Lok Sabha	16,113	1	1	1
2004	14th Lok Sabha	15,526	0	1	1
2009	15th Lok Sabha	20,492	1	1	1
2014	16th Lok Sabha	20,130	0	1	1
2019	17th Lok Sabha	22,028	0	1	1
2024	18th Lok Sabha	25,726	1	1	1

=== Madhya Pradesh ===
==== Legislative Assembly Elections ====
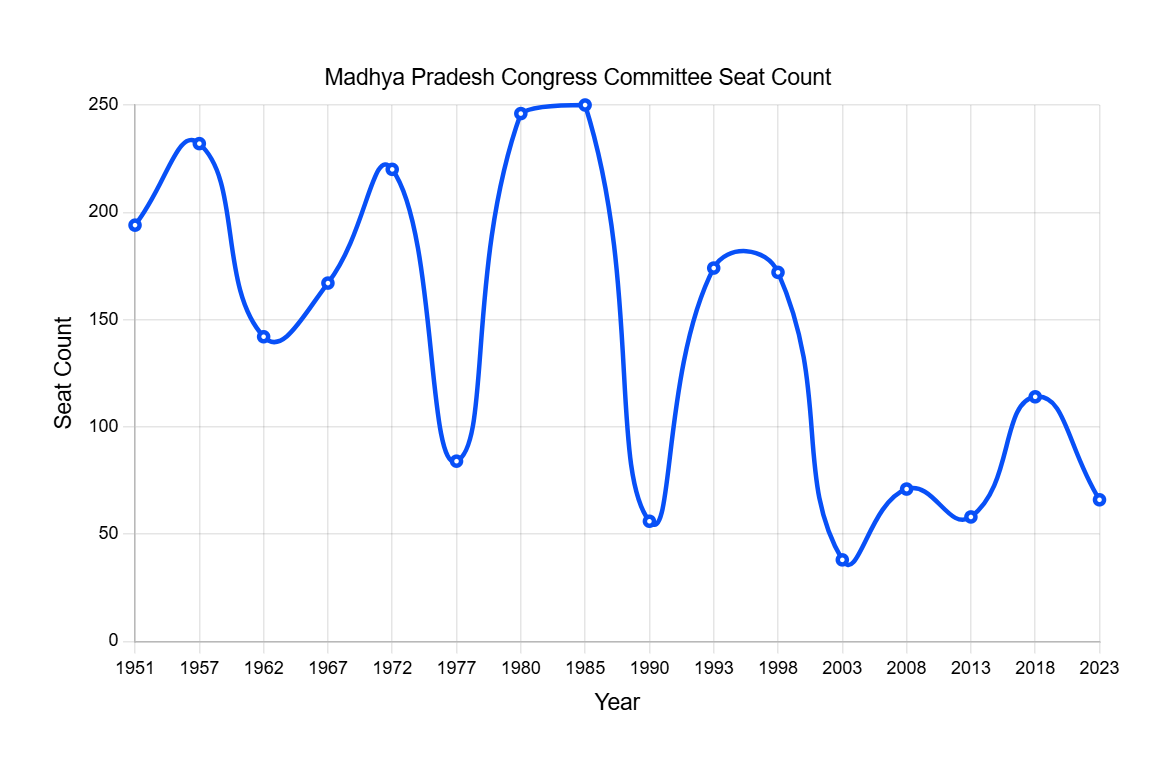
All time seat count of the Indian National Congress in Madhya Pradesh.

Year	General Election	Votes Polled	Seats Won	Seat Contested	Total Seats
1951	1st Assembly	3,434,058	194	225	232
1957	2nd Assembly	3,691,999	232	288	288
1962	3rd Assembly	2,527,257	142	288	288
1967	4th Assembly	3,700,686	167	296	320
1972	5th Assembly	5,219,823	220	289	320
1977	6th Assembly	4,200,717	84	320	320
1980	7th Assembly	5,741,077	246	320	320
1985	8th Assembly	6,937,747	250	320	320
1990	9th Assembly	6,634,518	56	318	320
1993	10th Assembly	9,628,464	174	318	320
1998	11th Assembly	10,778,985	172	316	320
2003	12th Assembly	8,059,414	38	228	230
2008	13th Assembly	8,170,318	71	228	230
2013	14th Assembly	12,315,253	58	230	230
2018	15th Assembly	15,595,696	114	229	230
2023	16th Assembly	17,188,236	66	230	230

==== General Elections ====
Year	General Election	Votes Polled	Seats Won	Seat Contested	Total Seats
1951	1st Lok Sabha	3,713,537	27	-	28
1957	2nd Lok Sabha	3,967,199	34	-	35
1962	3rd Lok Sabha	2,651,882	24	-	36
1967	4th Lok Sabha	3,774,364	24	-	37
1971	5th Lok Sabha	4,027,658	21	-	37
1977	6th Lok Sabha	3,835,807	1	-	40
1980	7th Lok Sabha	5,949,859	35	-	40
1984	8th Lok Sabha	8,898,835	40	40	40
1989	9th Lok Sabha	7,420,935	8	-	40
1991	10th Lok Sabha	7,425,644	27	-	40
1996	11th Lok Sabha	7,111,753	8	-	40
1998	12th Lok Sabha	10,611,317	10	-	40
1999	13th Lok Sabha	11,135,161	11	-	40
2004	14th Lok Sabha	6,289,013	4	-	29
2009	15th Lok Sabha	-	12	-	29
2014	16th Lok Sabha	-	2	29	29
2019	17th Lok Sabha	1,27,33,051	1	29	29
2024	18th Lok Sabha	12,308,049	0	29	29

=== Maharashtra ===
==== Legislative Assembly ====
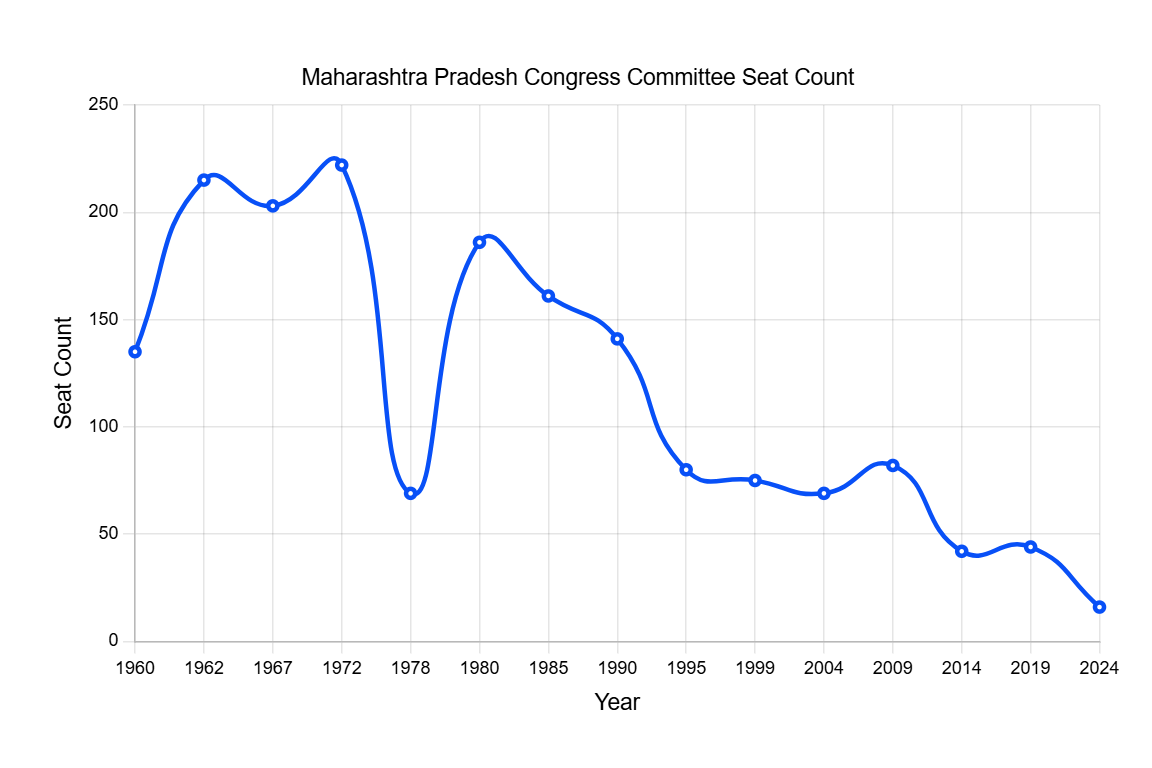
All time seat count of the Indian National Congress in Maharashtra.

Year	Assembly Election	Votes Polled	Vote Percent	Seat Contested	Seats Won	Seat Change	Outcome
1960	1st Assembly Constituted out of Bombay assembly (Polls held in 1957)	8,131,604	48.66% ▼1.29%	396 (264 Maharashtra Seats)	234 of Total; 135 / 264 of Maharashtra Seats	▼36	Government
1962	2nd Assembly	5,617,347	51.22% (▲2.56%)	264	215 / 264	▲80	Government
1967	3rd Assembly	6,288,564	47.03% (▼4.19%)	270	203 / 270	▼12	Government
1972	4th Assembly	8,535,832	56.36% (▲9.33%)	271	222 / 270	▲19	Government
1978	5th Assembly	5,159,828	25.33% (▼31.03%)	259	69 / 288	▼153	Coalition Government With Rebel Congress
1980	6th Assembly	7,809,533	44.50% (▲26.16%)	286	186 / 288	▲124	Government
1985	7th Assembly	9,522,556	43.41% (▼1.09%)	287	161 / 288	▼25	Government
1990	8th Assembly	11,334,773	38.17% (▼5.24%)	276	141 / 288	▼20	Government
1995	9th Assembly	11,941,832	31% (▼7.17%)	286	80 / 288	▼61	Opposition
1999	10th Assembly	8,937,043	27.2% (▼3.8%)	249	75 / 288	▼5	Coalition Government With NCP
2004	11th Assembly	8,810,363	21.06% (▼6.14%)	157	69 / 288	▼6	Coalition Government With NCP
2009	12th Assembly	9,521,703	21.01% (▼0.05%)	170	82 / 288	▲13	Coalition Government With NCP
2014	13th Assembly	9,496,095	17.95% (▼3.06%)	287	42 / 288	▼40	Opposition
2019	14th Assembly	8,752,199	15.87% (▼2.17%)	147	44 / 288	▲2	Coalition Government With SHS and NCP, Later Opposition
2024	15th Assembly	8,020,921	12.42% (▼3.45%)	101	16 / 288	▼28	Opposition

=== Manipur ===
==== Legislative Assembly ====
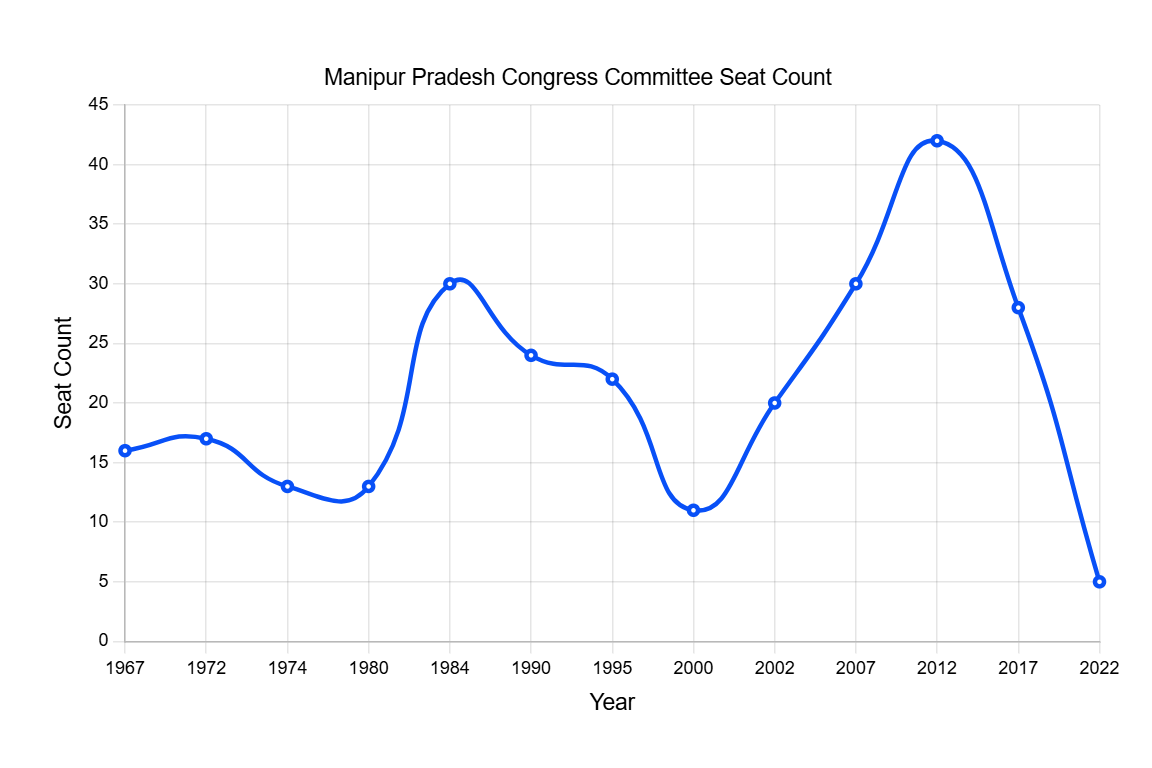
All time seat count of the Indian National Congress in Manipur.

Year	Assembly Election	Votes Polled	Seats Won	Seat Contested	Total Seats
1967	1st Assembly	101,504	16	-	30
1972	2nd Assembly	135,678	17	-	60
1974	3rd Assembly	164,717	13	-	60
1980	4th Assembly	158,127	13	-	60
1984	5th Assembly	257,809	30	-	60
1990	6th Assembly	333,765	24	-	60
1995	7th Assembly	328,362	22	-	60
2000	8th Assembly	230,748	11	-	60
2002	9th Assembly	345,660	20	-	60
2007	10th Assembly	345,660	30	-	60
2012	11th Assembly	592,566	42	-	60
2017	12th Assembly	582,056	28	-	60
2022	13th Assembly	312,659	5	53	60

==== General Assembly ====
Year	General Election	Votes Polled	Seats Won	Seat Contested	Total Seats
1951	1st Lok Sabha	36,317	1	-	2
1957	2nd Lok Sabha	48,687	1	-	2
1962	3rd Lok Sabha	81,860	1	-	2
1967	4th Lok Sabha	103,010	0	-	2
1971	5th Lok Sabha	77,974	2	2	2
1977	6th Lok Sabha	210,851	2	2	2
1980	7th Lok Sabha	164,473	1	-	2
1984	8th Lok Sabha	294,002	2	2	2
1989	9th Lok Sabha	387,829	2	-	2
1991	10th Lok Sabha	325,023	1	-	2
1996	11th Lok Sabha	385,206	2	2	2
1998	12th Lok Sabha	139,434	0	-	2
1999	13th Lok Sabha	226,047	0	-	2
2004	14th Lok Sabha	154,055	1	1	2
2009	15th Lok Sabha	-	2	2	2
2014	16th Lok Sabha	-	2	2	2
2019	17th Lok Sabha	398,387	0	2	2
2024	18th Lok Sabha		2	2	2

=== Meghalaya ===
==== Legislative Assembly ====
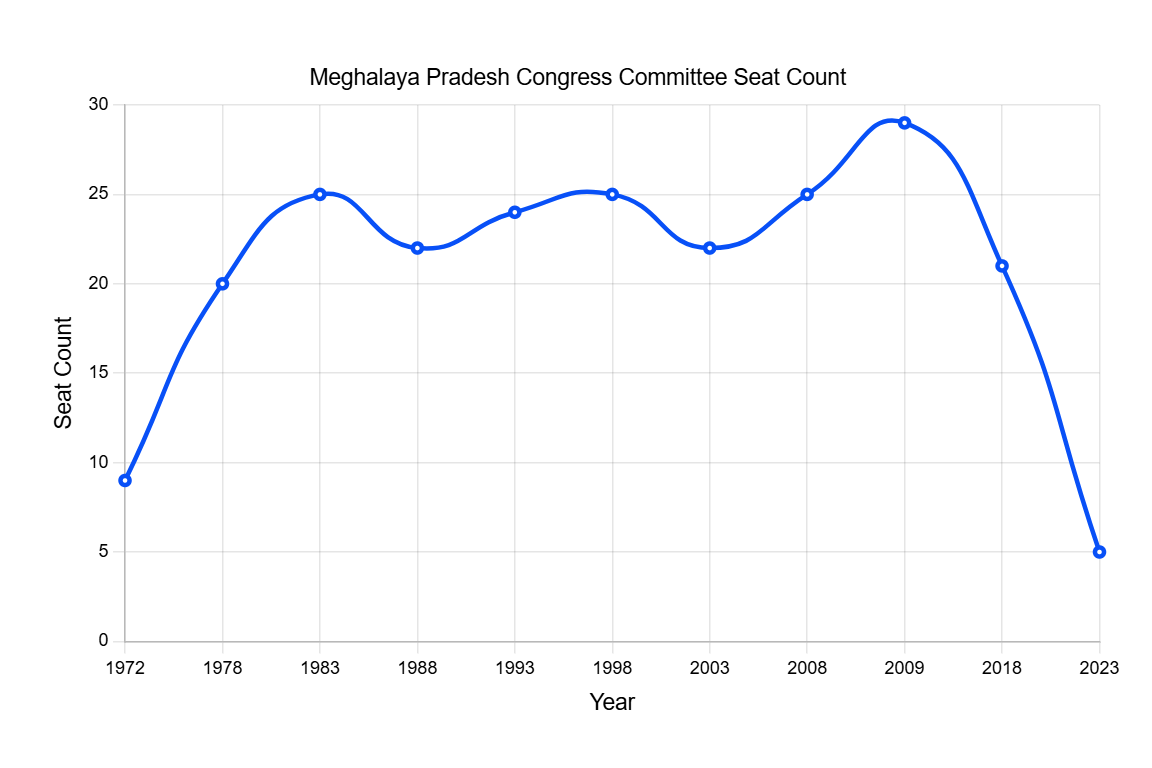
All time seat count of the Indian National Congress in Meghalaya.

Year	Assembly Election	Votes Polled	Seats Won	Seat Contested	Total Seats
1972	1st Assembly	20,474	9	-	60
1978	2nd Assembly	109,654	20	-	60
1983	3rd Assembly	130,956	25	-	60
1988	4th Assembly	198,028	22	-	60
1993	5th Assembly	282,139	24	-	60
1998	6th Assembly	293,346	25	-	60
2003	7th Assembly	270,269	22	-	60
2008	8th Assembly	357,113	25	59	60
2009	9th Assembly	458,783	29	60	60
2018	10th Assembly	447,472	21	59	60
2023	11th Assembly	243,841	5	60	60

==== General Elections ====
Year	General Election	Votes Polled	Seats Won	Seat Contested	Total Seats
1977	6th Lok Sabha	91,255	1	-	2
1980	7th Lok Sabha	82,307	1	-	2
1984	8th Lok Sabha	249,266	2	2	2
1989	9th Lok Sabha	264,210	2	2	2
1991	10th Lok Sabha	281,562	2	2	2
1996	11th Lok Sabha	353,327	1	2	2
1998	12th Lok Sabha	399,583	2	2	2
1999	13th Lok Sabha	214,324	1	2	2
2004	14th Lok Sabha	309,233	1	2	2
2009	15th Lok Sabha	-	1	1	2
2014	16th Lok Sabha	-	1	1	2
2019	17th Lok Sabha	6,60,114	1	2	2
2024	18th Lok Sabha		1	2	2

=== Mizoram ===
==== Legislative Assembly ====
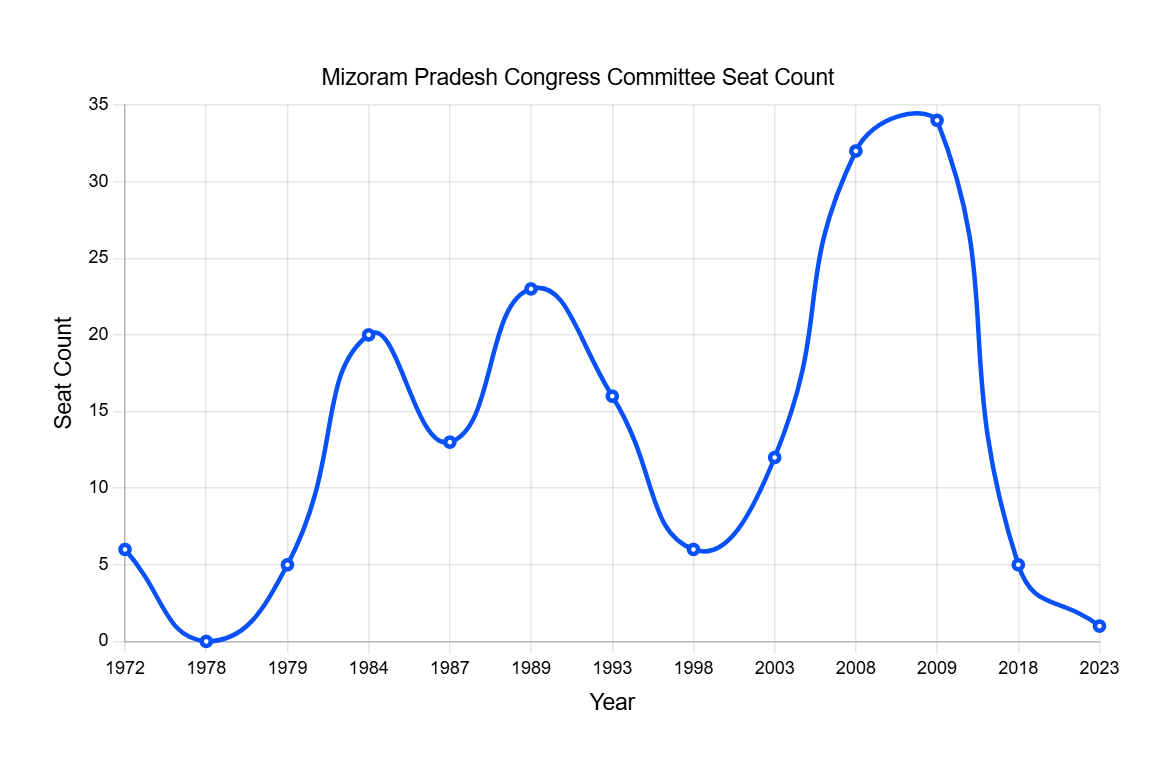
All time seat count of the Indian National Congress in Mizoram.

Year	Assembly Election	Votes Polled	Seats Won	Seat Contested	Total Seats	Outcome
1972	1st Assembly	34,421	6	29	30	Opposition
1978	2nd Assembly	-	-	-	-	
1979	3rd Assembly	39,115	5	25	30	Opposition
1984	4th Assembly	74,005	20	30	30	Government
1987	5th Assembly	76,152	13	40	40	Opposition
1989	6th Assembly	93,561	23	34	40	Government
1993	7th Assembly	106,320	16	28	40	Government
1998	8th Assembly	100,608	6	40	40	Opposition
2003	9th Assembly	125,690	12	40	40	Opposition
2008	10th Assembly	195,614	32	40	40	Government
2013	11th Assembly	255,917	34	40	40	Government
2018	12th Assembly	190,412	5	40	40	Opposition
2023	13th Assembly	146,113	1	40	40	Opposition

==== General Assembly ====
Year	General Election	Votes Polled	Seats Won	Seat Contested	Total Seats
1977	6th Lok Sabha	37,342	0	1	1
1989	9th Lok Sabha	109,571	1	1	1
1991	10th Lok Sabha	91,612	1	1	1
1996	11th Lok Sabha	126,191	1	1	1
1998	12th Lok Sabha	106,511	0	1	1
1999	11th Lok Sabha	-	-	-	1
2004	14th Lok Sabha	-	-	-	1
2009	15th Lok Sabha	-	1	1	1
2014	16th Lok Sabha	-	1	1	1
2019	17th Lok Sabha	-	0	0	1
2024	18th Lok Sabha	97,761	0	1	1

=== Nagaland ===
==== Legislative Assembly ====
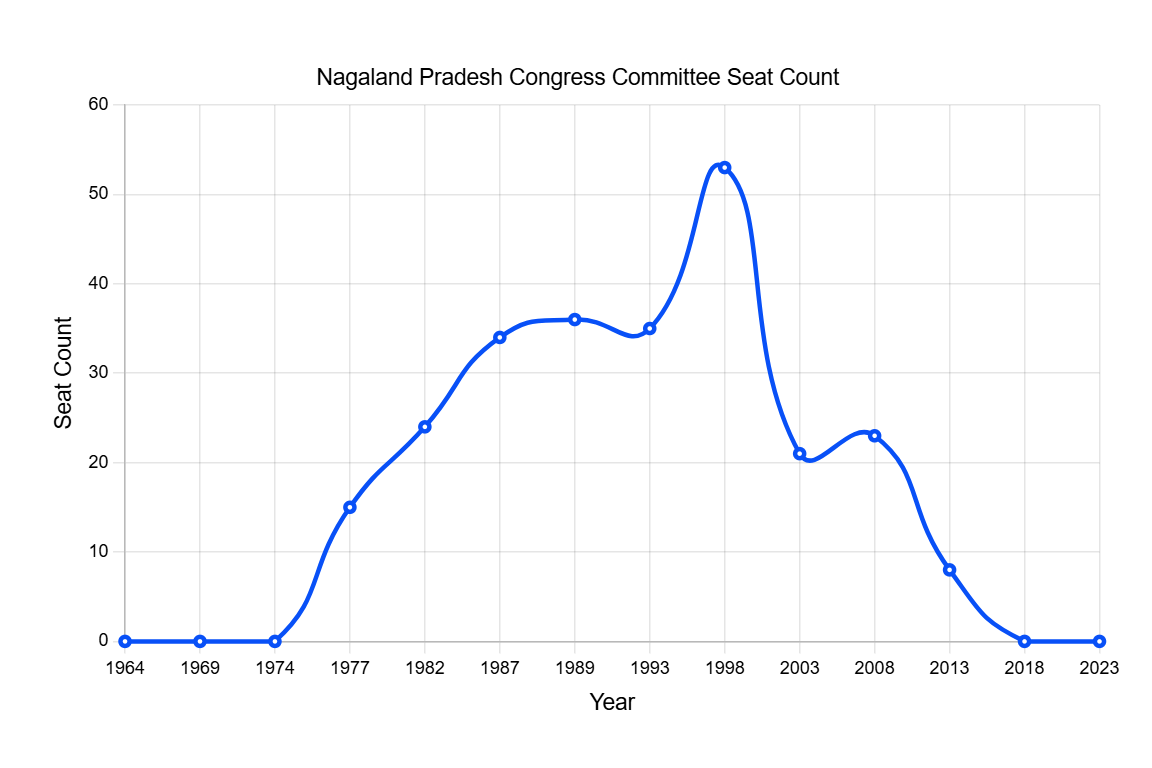
All time seat count of the Indian National Congress in Nagaland.

Year	Assembly Election	Votes Polled	Seats Won	Seat Contested	Total Seats
1964	1st Assembly	-	-	-	40
1969	2nd Assembly	-	-	-	40
1974	3rd Assembly	-	-	-	40
1977	4th Assembly	65,616	15	-	60
1982	5th Assembly	140,420	24	-	60
1987	6th Assembly	193,199	34	-	60
1989	7th Assembly	253,792	36	-	60
1993	8th Assembly	335,834	35	-	60
1998	9th Assembly	103,206	53	-	60
2003	10th Assembly	318,671	21	-	60
2008	11th Assembly	411,100	23	-	60
2013	12h Assembly	272,515	8	-	60
2018	13th Assembly	20,752	0	18	60
2023	14th Assembly	40,810	0	23	60

==== General Assembly ====
Year	General Election	Votes Polled	Seats Won	Seat Contested	Total Seats
1977	6th Lok Sabha	116,527	0	0	1
1984	8th Lok Sabha	251,101	1	1	1
1989	9th Lok Sabha	363,071	1	1	1
1991	10th Lok Sabha	276,161	0	1	1
1996	11th Lok Sabha	472,102	1	1	1
1998	12th Lok Sabha	344,223	1	1	1
1999	13th Lok Sabha	516,119	1	1	1
2004	14th Lok Sabha	246,109	0	1	1
2009	15th Lok Sabha	349,203	0	1	1
2014	16th Lok Sabha	313,147	0	1	1
2019	17th Lok Sabha	4,84,166	0	1	1
2024	18th Lok Sabha		1	1	1

=== Odisha ===
==== Assembly Elections ====
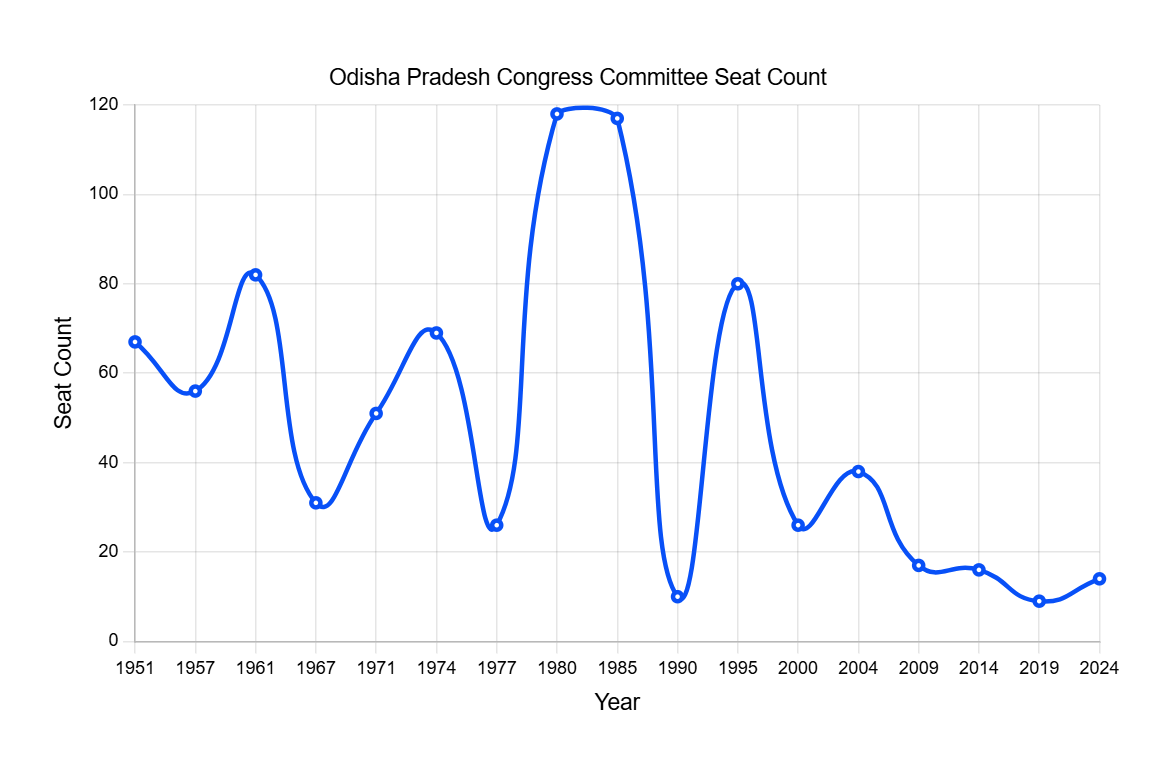
All time seat count of the Indian National Congress in Odisha.

Year	Assembly Election	Votes Polled	Seats Won	Seat Contested	Total Seats
1951	1st Assembly	1,392,501	67	135	140
1957	2nd Assembly	1,628,180	56	140	140
1961	3rd Assembly	1,269,000	82	140	140
1967	4th Assembly	1,235,149	31	140	140
1971	5th Assembly	1,240,668	51	129	140
1974	6th Assembly	2,152,818	69	135	146
1977	7th Assembly	1,594,505	26	146	147
1980	8th Assembly	3,037,487	118	147	147
1985	9th Assembly	4,007,258	117	147	147
1990	10th Assembly	3,264,000	10	145	147
1995	11th Assembly	6,180,237	80	146	147
2000	12th Assembly	4,770,654	26	145	147
2004	13th Assembly	5,896,713	38	134	147
2009	14th Assembly	-	17	145	147
2014	15th Assembly	5,535,670	16	-	147
2019	16th Assembly	37,75,320	9	147	147
2024	17th Assembly		14	147	147

==== General Elections ====
Year	General Election	Votes Polled	Seats Won	Seat Contested	Total Seats
1951	1st Lok Sabha	1,555,787	11	-	20
1957	2nd Lok Sabha	1,776,767	7	-	20
1962	3rd Lok Sabha	1,093,297	14	-	20
1967	4th Lok Sabha	1,353,704	6	-	20
1971	5th Lok Sabha	1,716,021	15	-	20
1977	6th Lok Sabha	2,059,490	4	-	21
1980	7th Lok Sabha	3,451,255	20	-	21
1984	8th Lok Sabha	4,692,933	20	-	21
1989	9th Lok Sabha	4,298,516	3	-	21
1991	10th Lok Sabha	4,598,809	13	-	21
1996	11th Lok Sabha	5,850,025	17	-	21
1998	12th Lok Sabha	5,477,410	5	-	21
1999	13th Lok Sabha	4,901,186	2	-	21
2004	14th Lok Sabha	6,845,738	2	-	21
2009	15th Lok Sabha	-	6	-	21
2014	16th Lok Sabha	-	0	-	21
2019	17th Lok Sabha	32,85,192	1	21	21
2024	18th Lok Sabha		1	20	21

=== Punjab ===
==== Legislative Assembly Election ====
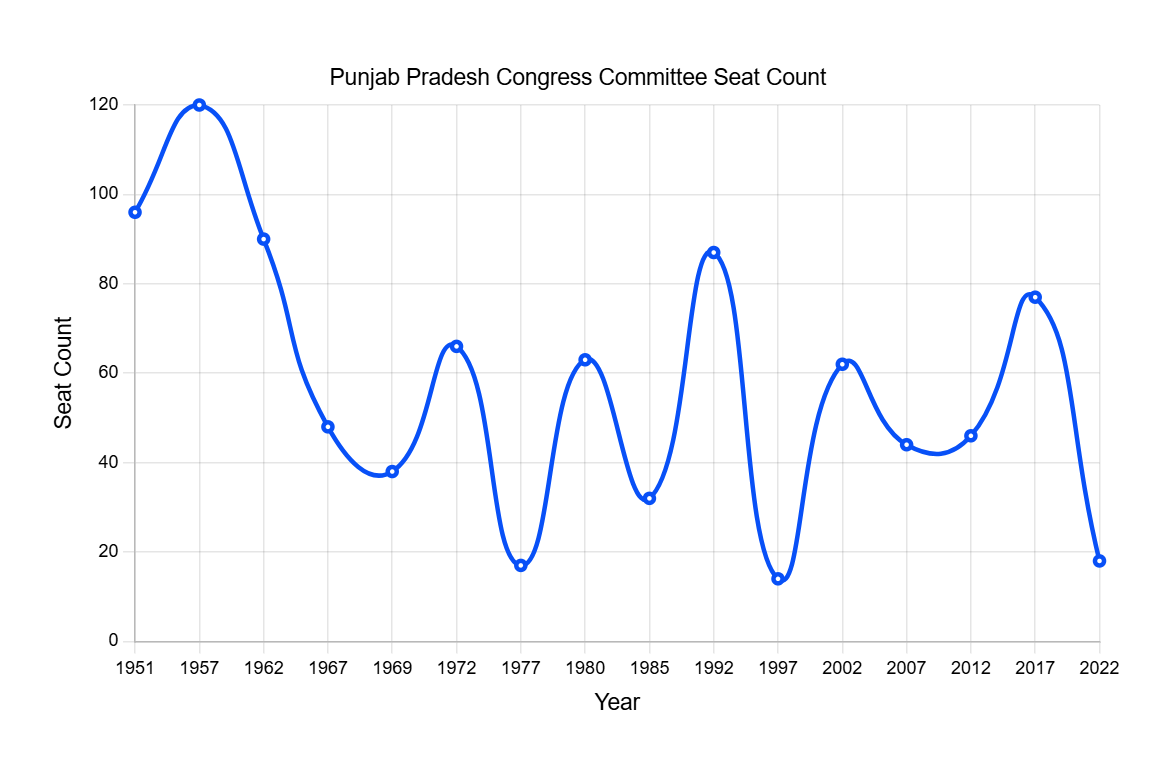
All time seat count of the Indian National Congress in Punjab.

Year	Assembly Election	Votes Polled	Vote Percent	Seats Won	Seat Change	Outcome
1951	1st Assembly	1,830,601	N.A.	96 / 126	▲96	Government
1957	2nd Assembly	3,612,709	N.A.	120 / 154	▲24	Government
1962	3rd Assembly	2,946,209	N.A.	90 / 154	▼30	Government
1967	4th Assembly	1,594,160	N.A.	48 / 104	▼42	Opposition
1969	5th Assembly	1,844,360	N.A.	38 / 104	▼10	Opposition
1972	6th Assembly	2,083,390	N.A.	66 / 104	▲28	Government
1977	7th Assembly	1,899,534	N.A.	17 / 117	▼49	Opposition
1980	8th Assembly	2,825,827	N.A.	63 / 117	▲46	Government
1985	9th Assembly	2,620,042	N.A.	32 / 117	▼31	Opposition
1992	10th Assembly	1,317,075	N.A.	87 / 117	▲55	Government
1997	11th Assembly	2,736,346	N.A.	14 / 117	▼73	Opposition
2002	12th Assembly	3,682,877	N.A.	62 / 117	▲48	Government
2007	13h Assembly	5,170,548	40.90%	44 / 117	▼18	Opposition
2012	14th Assembly	5,572,643	40.11% (▼0.79%)	46 / 117	▲2	Opposition
2017	15th Assembly	5,945,899	38.64% (▼1.46%)	77 / 117	▲31	Government
2022	16th Assembly	3,576,684	22.98% (▼15.66%)	18 / 117	▼59	Opposition

==== General Election ====
Year	General Election	Votes Polled	Seats Won	Seat Contested	Change
1951	1st Lok Sabha	2,134,586	16	-	-
1957	2nd Lok Sabha	3,682,219	21	-	-
1962	3rd Lok Sabha	2,802,692	14	-	-
1967	4th Lok Sabha	1,598,546	9	-	-
1971	5th Lok Sabha	1,873,862	10	-	-
1977	6th Lok Sabha	1,955,485	0	-	-
1980	7th Lok Sabha	3,133,473	12	-	-
1985	8th Lok Sabha	2,879,089	6	-	-
1989	9th Lok Sabha	2,103,712	2	-	-
1992	10th Lok Sabha	1,486,289	12	-	-
1996	11th Lok Sabha	3,098,956	2	-	-
1998	12th Lok Sabha	2,356,281	0	-	-
1999	13th Lok Sabha	3,365,176	2	-	-
2004	14th Lok Sabha	3,495,187	2 / 13	13	
2009	15th Lok Sabha	-	8 / 13	13	▲6
2014	16th Lok Sabha	-	3 / 13	13	▼5
2019	17th Lok Sabha	5,523,066	8 / 13	13	▲5
2024	18th Lok Sabha	3,543,824	7 / 13	13	▼1

=== Rajasthan ===
==== Legislative Assembly Elections ====
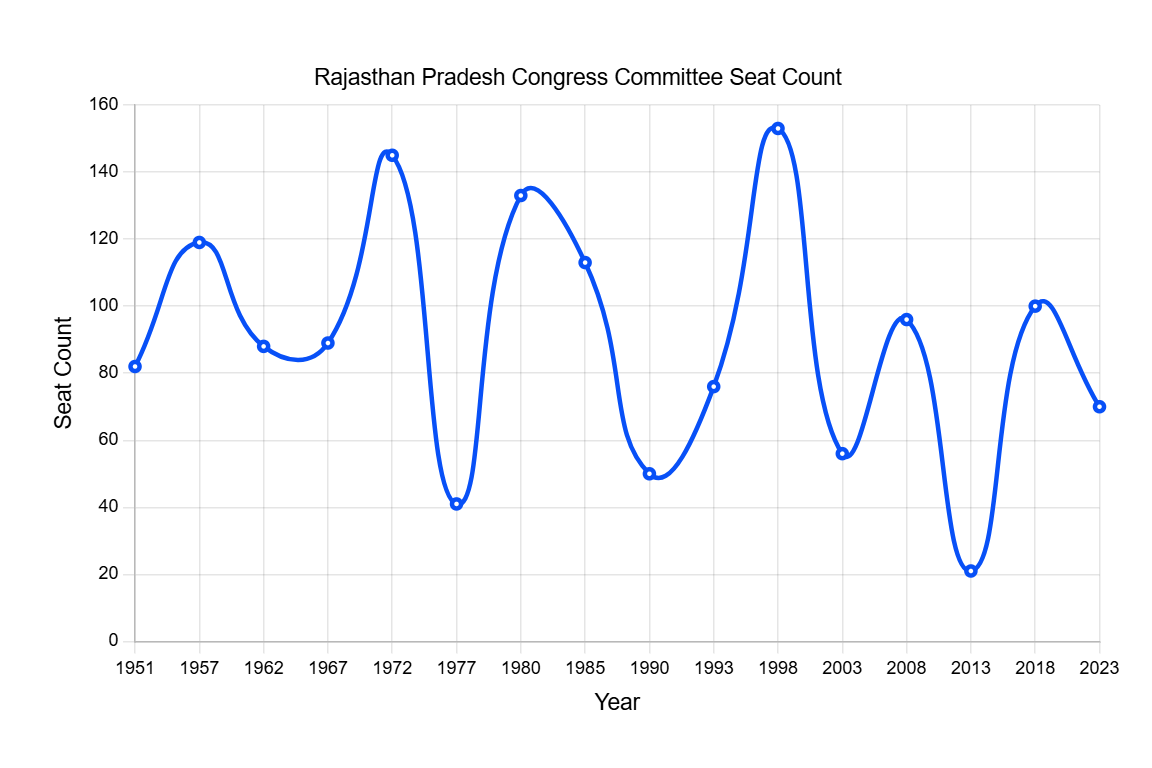
All time seat count of the Indian National Congress in Rajasthan.

Year	Assembly Election	Votes Polled	Vote Percent	Seat Contested	Seats Won	Seat Change	Outcome
1951	1st Assembly	1,286,953	51.25%	156	82 / 160	▲82	Government
1957	2nd Assembly	2,141,931	67.61%	176	119 / 176	▲37	Government
1962	3rd Assembly	2,052,383	39.98%	N.A.	88 / 176	▼31	Government
1967	4th Assembly	2,798,411	41.42%	N.A.	89 / 184	▲1	Government
1972	5th Assembly	3,976,157	51.13%	N.A.	145 / 184	▲56	Government
1977	6th Assembly	2,599,772	31.49%	N.A.	41 / 200	▼104	Opposition
1980	7th Assembly	3,975,315	42.96%	N.A.	133 / 200	▲92	Government
1985	8th Assembly	5,342,920	46.67%	N.A.	113 / 200	▼20	Government
1990	9th Assembly	4,988,699	33.67%	N.A.	50 / 200	▼63	Opposition
1993	10th Assembly	6,442,721	38.27%	N.A.	76 / 200	▲26	Opposition
1998	11th Assembly	8,467,160	44.95%	N.A.	153 / 200	▲77	Government
2003	12th Assembly	8,120,605	N.A.	200	56 / 200	▼97	Opposition
2008	13th Assembly	8,872,184	36.82%	200	96 / 200	▲40	Government
2013	14th Assembly	10,204,694	33.07%	200	21 / 200	▼75	Opposition
2018	15th Assembly	13,935,201	39.3%	200	100 / 200	▲79	Government
2023	16th Assembly	15,761,681	39.53%	200	70 / 200	▼30	Opposition

==== General Elections ====
Year	General Election	Votes Polled	Seats Won	Seat Contested	Total Seats
1951	1st Lok Sabha	1,460,971	9	-	20
1957	2nd Lok Sabha	2,494,094	19	-	22
1962	3rd Lok Sabha	1,951,507	14	-	22
1967	4th Lok Sabha	2,722,493	10	-	23
1971	5th Lok Sabha	3,486,776	14	-	23
1977	6th Lok Sabha	2,568,345	1	-	25
1980	7th Lok Sabha	4,040,398	18	-	25
1984	8th Lok Sabha	5,898,116	25	-	25
1989	9th Lok Sabha	5,285,868	0	-	25
1991	10th Lok Sabha	5,407,144	13	-	25
1996	11th Lok Sabha	5,253,531	12	-	25
1998	12th Lok Sabha	7,846,072	18	-	25
1999	13th Lok Sabha	7,475,888	9	-	25
2004	14th Lok Sabha	7,179,939	4	-	25
2009	15th Lok Sabha	-	20	-	25
2014	16th Lok Sabha	-	0	-	25
2019	17th Lok Sabha	11,107,910	0	25	25
2024	18th Lok Sabha		8	-	25

=== Sikkim ===
==== Legislative Assembly Election ====
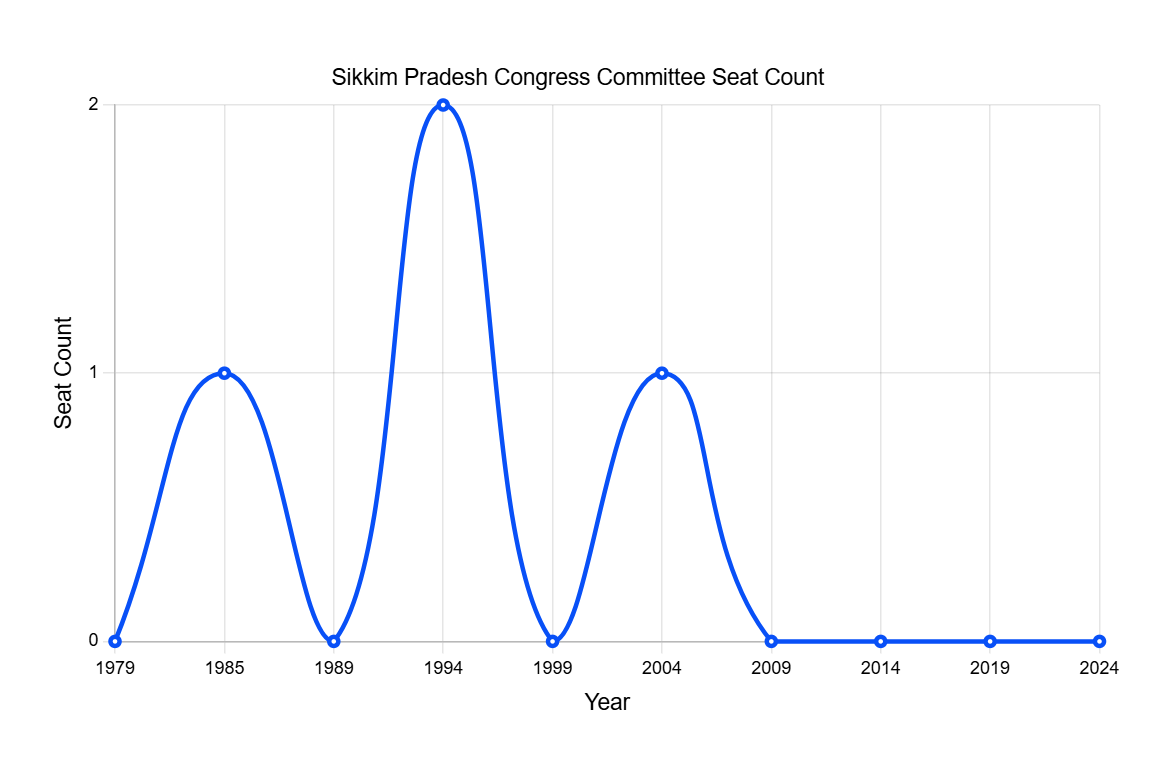
All time seat count of the Indian National Congress in Sikkim.

Year	Assembly Election	Votes Polled	Seats Won	Seat Contested	Total Seats
1979	1st Assembly	1,476	0	12	32
1985	2nd Assembly	23,440	1	32	32
1989	3rd Assembly	24,121	0	31	32
1994	4th Assembly	26,045	2	31	32
1999	5th Assembly	7,512	0	31	32
2004	6th Assembly	51,329	1	28	32
2009	7th Assembly	69,612	0	32	32
2014	8th Assembly	4,390	0	32	32
2019	9th Assembly	2,721	0	24	32
2024	10th Assembly	1,228	0	12	32

==== General Election ====
Year	General Election	Votes Polled	Seats Won	Seat Contested	Total Seats
1984	8th Lok Sabha	21,327	0	1	1
1989	9th Lok Sabha	28,822	0	1	1
1998	12th Lok Sabha	51,611	0	1	1
1999	13th Lok Sabha	9,762	0	1	1
2004	14th Lok Sabha	60,258	0	1	1
2009	15th Lok Sabha	-	0	1	1
2014	16th Lok Sabha	-	0	1	1
2019	17th Lok Sabha	3,990	0	1	1
2024	18th Lok Sabha	2,241	0	1	1

=== Tamil Nadu ===
==== Legislative Assembly Election ====
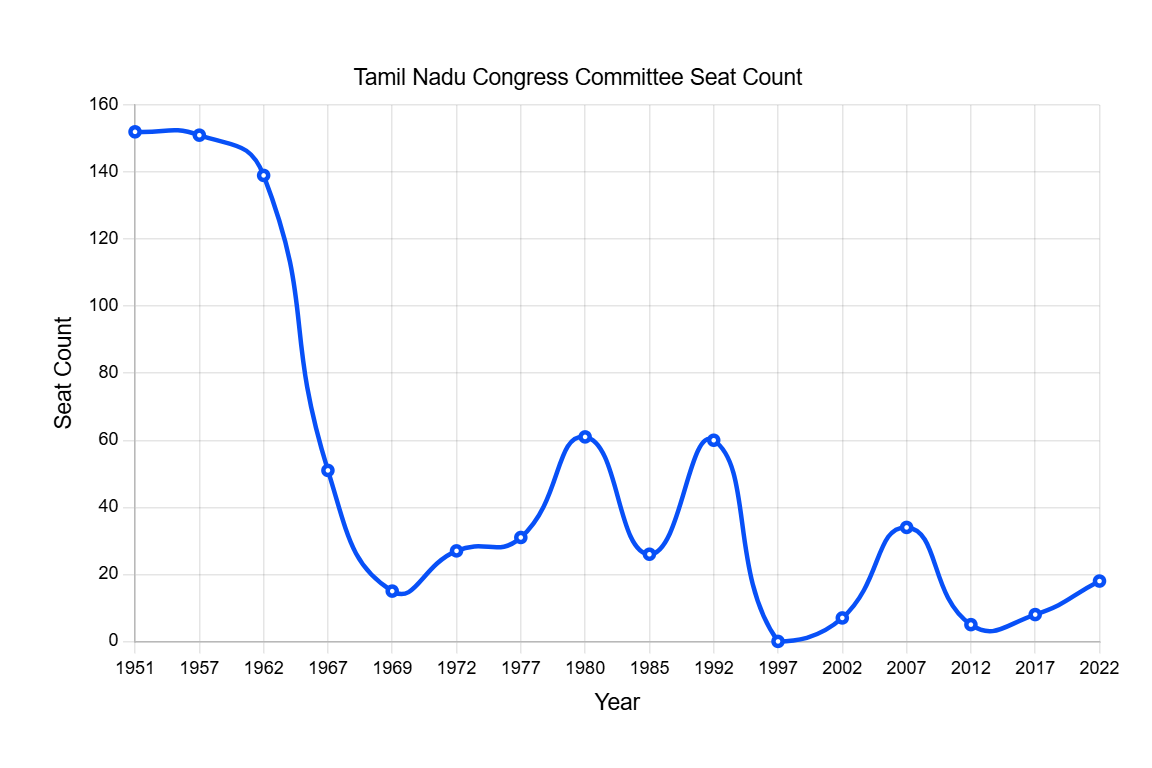
All time seat count of the Indian National Congress in TN.

As Madras State

Year	Assembly Election	Votes Polled	Seats Won	Seat Contested	Total Seats
1951	1st Assembly	6,988,701	152	367	375
1957	2nd Assembly	5,046,576	151	204	205
1962	3rd Assembly	5,848,974	139	206	206
1967	4th Assembly	6,293,378	51	232	234

As Tamil Nadu

Year	Assembly Election	Votes Polled	Seats Won	Seat Contested	Total Seats
1971	5th Assembly	5,513,894	15	201	234
1977	6th Assembly	2,994,535	27	198	234
1980	7th Assembly	3,941,900	31	114	234
1984	8th Assembly	3,529,708	61	73	234
1989	9th Assembly	4,780,714	26	214	234
1991	10th Assembly	3,743,859	60	65	234
1996	11th Assembly	1,523,340	0	64	234
2001	12th Assembly	696,205	7	14	234
2006	13th Assembly	2,765,768	34	48	234
2011	14th Assembly	3,426,432	5	63	234
2016	15th Assembly	2,774,075	8	41	234
2021	16th Assembly	1,976,527	18	25	234
2026	17th Assembly	1,661,312	5	28	234

==== General Election ====
As Madras State

Year	General Election	Votes Polled	Seats Won	Seat Contested	Total Seats
1951	1st Lok Sabha	7,253,452	35	-	
1957	2nd Lok Sabha	5,094,552	31	-	
1962	3rd Lok Sabha	5,623,013	31	-	
1967	4th Lok Sabha	6,436,710	3	-	

As Tamil Nadu

Year	General Election	Votes Polled	Seats Won	Seat Contested	Total Seats
1971	5th Lok Sabha	1,995,567	9	-	
1977	6th Lok Sabha	3,977,306	14	16	39
1980	7th Lok Sabha	5,821,411	20	22	39
1984	8th Lok Sabha	8,755,871	25	26	39
1989	9th Lok Sabha	10,524,027	27	28	39
1991	10th Lok Sabha	10,510,569	28	28	39
1996	11th Lok Sabha	4,965,364	0	29	39
1998	12th Lok Sabha	1,223,102	0	35	39
1999	13th Lok Sabha	3,022,107	2	11	39
2004	14th Lok Sabha	4,134,255	10	10	39
2009	15th Lok Sabha	-	8	15	39
2014	16th Lok Sabha	-	0	39	39
2019	17th Lok Sabha	5,405,674	8	9	39
2024	18th Lok Sabha		9	9	39

=== Telangana ===
==== Legislative Assembly Election ====
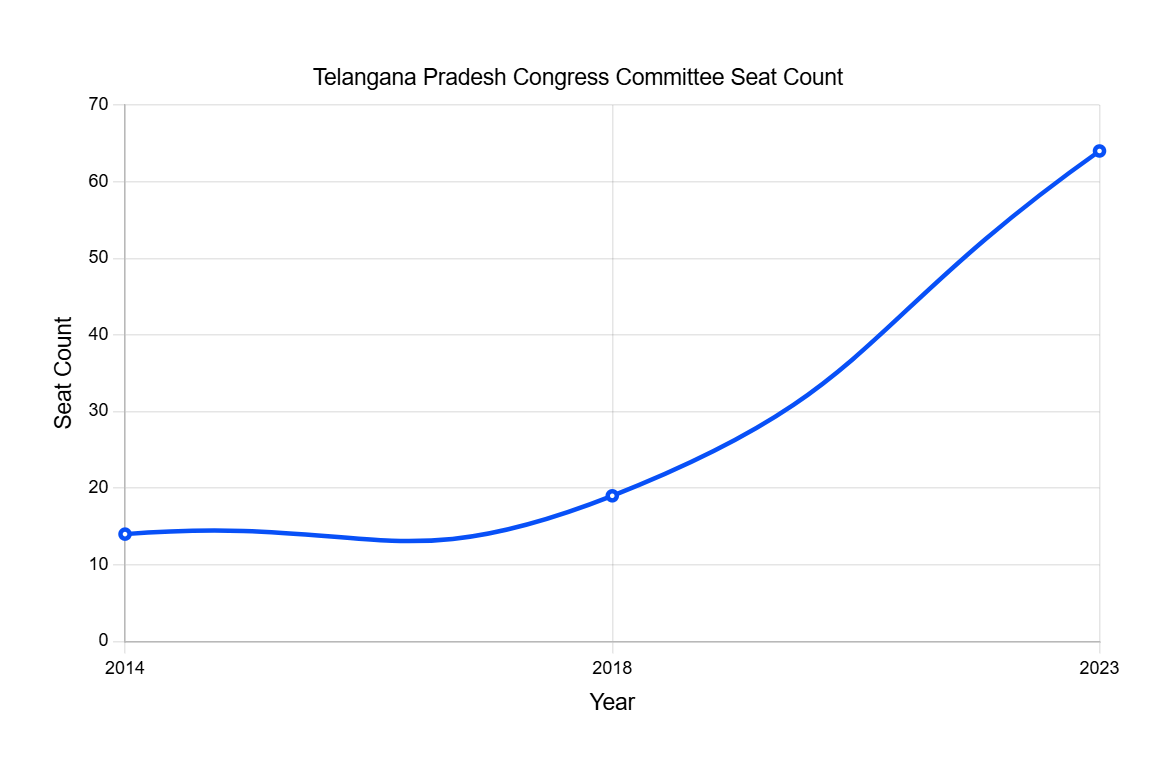
All time seat count of the Indian National Congress in Telangana.

Year	Assembly Election	Votes Polled	Vote Percent	Seat Contested	Seats Won	Seat Change	Outcome
2014	1st Assembly	N.A.	N.A.	N.A.	14 / 119	▲14	Opposition
2018	2nd Assembly	5,883,111	28.4	99	19 / 119	▲5	Opposition
2023	3rd Assembly	9,235,792	39.40	118	64 / 119	▲45	Government

==== General Election ====
Year	General Election	Votes Polled	Seats Won	Seat Contested	Total Seats
2014	16th Lok Sabha	N.A.	2	N.A.	17
2019	17th Lok Sabha	-	3	17	17
2024	18th Lok Sabha		8	17	17

=== Tripura ===
==== Legislative Assembly Election ====
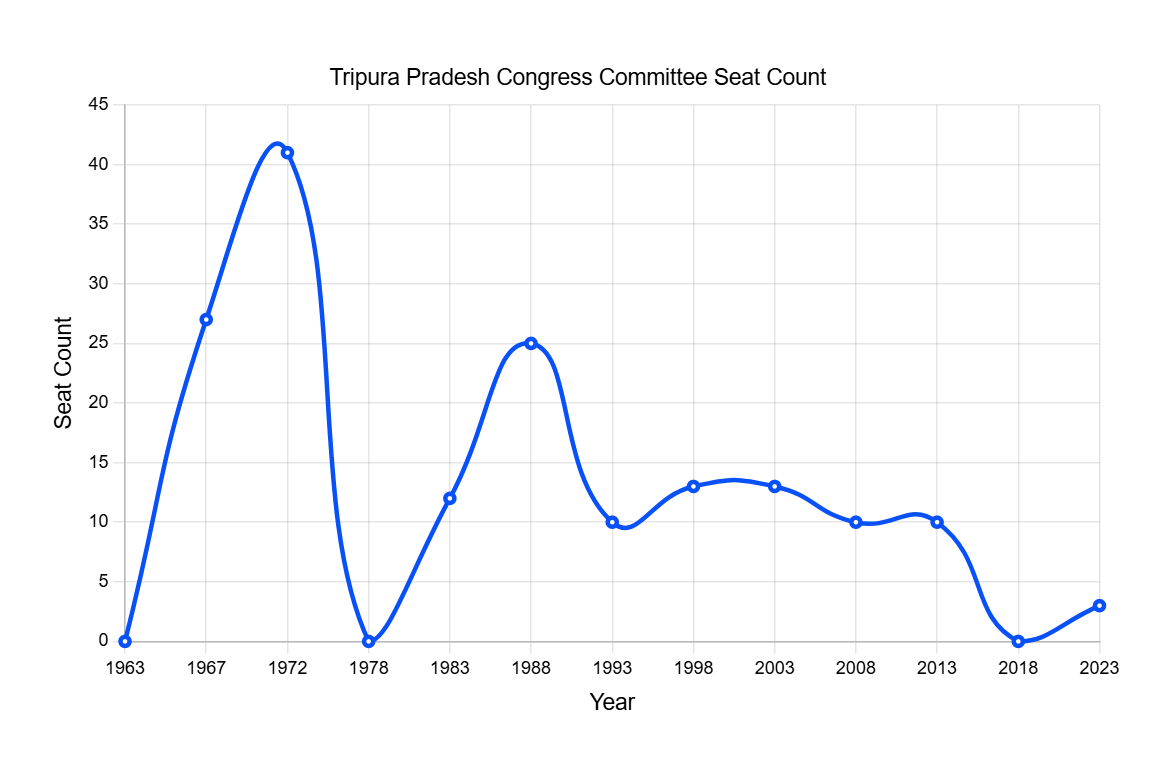
All time seat count of the Indian National Congress in Tripura.

Year	Assembly Election	Votes Polled	Seats Won	Seat Contested	Total Seats
1963	1st Assembly	N.A.	N.A.	N.A.	N>A.
1967	2nd Assembly	251,345	27	30	30
1972	3rd Assembly	224,821	41	59	60
1978	4th Assembly	133,240	0	60	60
1983	5th Assembly	282,859	12	45	60
1988	6th Assembly	424,241	25	46	60
1993	7th Assembly	438,561	10	46	60
1998	8th Assembly	464,171	13	45	60
2003	9th Assembly	498,749	13	60	60
2008	10th Assembly	684,207	10	48	60
2013	11th Assembly	804,457	10	-	60
2018	12th Assembly	41,325	0	59	60
2023	13th Assembly	216,637	3	13	60

==== General Election ====
Year	General Election	Votes Polled	Seats Won	Seat Contested	Total Seats
1951	1st Lok Sabha	Not Available	0	2	2
1957	2nd Lok Sabha	Not Available	1	2	2
1962	3rd Lok Sabha	Not Available	0	2	2
1967	4th Lok Sabha	Not Available	2	2	2
1971	5th Lok Sabha	Not Available	0	2	2
1977	6th Lok Sabha	Not Available	1	2	2
1980	7th Lok Sabha	Not Available	0	2	2
1984	8th Lok Sabha	Not Available	0	2	2
1989	9th Lok Sabha	Not Available	2	2	2
1991	10th Lok Sabha	Not Available	2	2	2
1996	11th Lok Sabha	Not Available	0	2	2
1998	12th Lok Sabha	Not Available	0	2	2
1999	13th Lok Sabha	Not Available	0	2	2
2004	14th Lok Sabha	Not Available	0	2	2
2009	15th Lok Sabha	Not Available	0	2	2
2014	16th Lok Sabha	Not Available	0	2	2
2019	17th Lok Sabha	5,45,679	0	2	2
2024	18th Lok Sabha	269,763	0	1	2

=== Uttar Pradesh ===
==== Legislative Assembly Elections ====
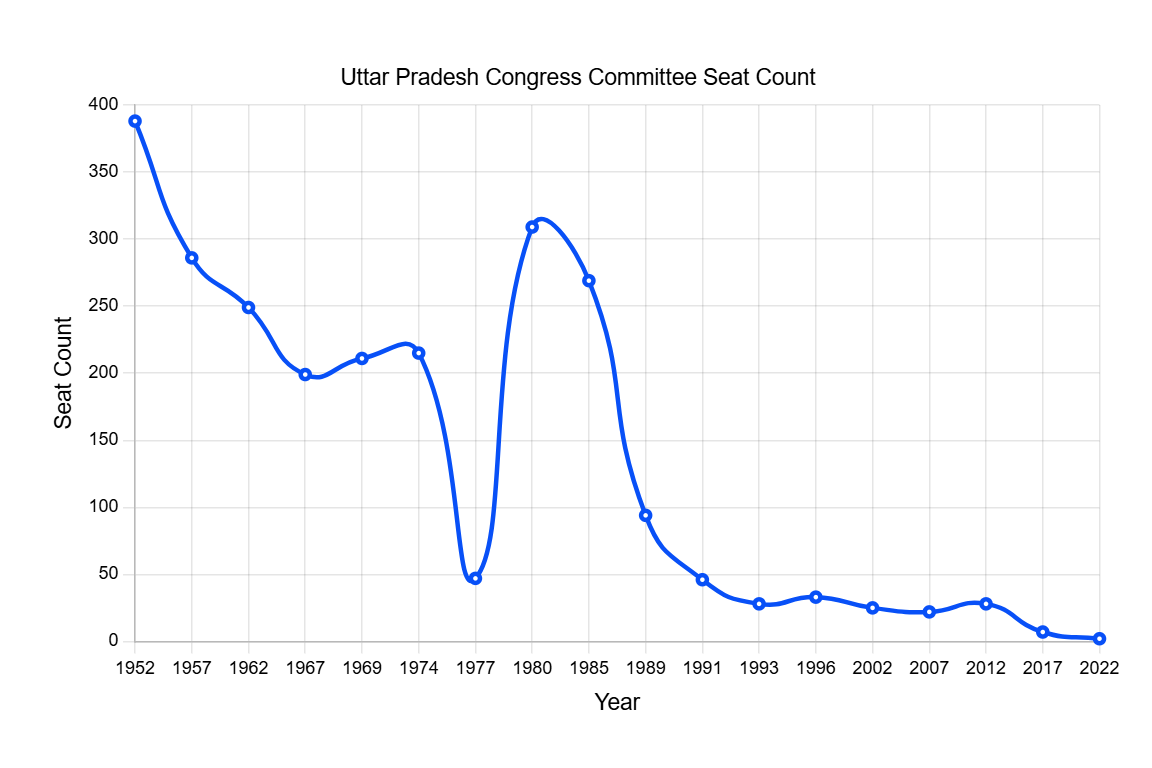
All time seat count of the Indian National Congress in UP.

Year	Legislature	Leader	Seats Contested	Seats won	Change in seats	Votes	Percentage of votes	Vote swing	Outcome
1952	1st Assembly	Govind Vallabh Pant	429	388 / 430	-	8,032,475	47.93	-	Government
1957	2nd Assembly	Sampurnanand	430	286 / 430	▼102	9,298,382	42.42	▼5.51	Government
1962	3rd Assembly	Chandra Bhanu Gupta	429	249 / 430	▼37	6,471,669	36.35	▼6.07	Government
1967	4th Assembly	Chandra Bhanu Gupta	425	199 / 425	▼50	6,912,104	32.20	▼4.15	Government
1969	5th Assembly	Chandra Bhanu Gupta	424	211 / 425	▲12	7,893,152	33.69	▼1.49	
1974	6th Assembly	Hemwati Nandan Bahuguna	403	215 / 424	▲4	8,868,229	32.29	▼1.40	Government
1977	7th Assembly		395	47 / 425	▼168	7,592,107	31.94	▼0.35	Opposition
1980	8th Assembly	V. P. Singh	424	309 / 425	▲262	9,720,767	37.65	▲5.71	Government
1985	9th Assembly	Narayan Datt Tiwari	425	269 / 425	▼40	11,544,698	39.25	▲1.60	Government
1989	10th Assembly	Narayan Datt Tiwari	410	94 / 425	▼175	10,866,428	27.90	▼11.35	Opposition
1991	11th Assembly	Narayan Datt Tiwari	413	46 / 419	▼48	6,480,753	17.32	▼10.58	Opposition
1993	12th Assembly		421	28 / 422	▼18	7,533,272	15.08	▼2.24	Opposition
1996	13th Assembly		126	33 / 424	▲5	4,626,663	8.35	▼6.73	Opposition
2002	14th Assembly	Pramod Tiwari	402	25 / 403	▼8	4,810,231	8.96	▲0.61	Opposition
2007	15th Assembly	Sonia Gandhi	393	22 / 403	▼13	4,489,234	8.61	▼0.35	Opposition
2012	16th Assembly	Raj Babbar	355	28 / 403	▲6	8,832,895	11.65	▲3.04	Opposition
2017	17th Assembly		114	7 / 403	▼21	5,416,324	6.25	▼5.40	Opposition
2022	18th Assembly	Priyanka Gandhi	399	2 / 403	▼5	2,151,234	2.33	▼3.92	Opposition

==== General Election ====
Year	General Election	Votes Polled	Seats Won	Seat Contested	Total Seats
1951	1st Lok Sabha	9,047,392	81	-	85
1957	2nd Lok Sabha	10,599,639	70	-	85
1962	3rd Lok Sabha	6,842,472	62	-	85
1967	4th Lok Sabha	7,285,130	47	-	85
1971	5th Lok Sabha	9,981,309	73	-	85
1977	6th Lok Sabha	7,170,182	0	-	85
1980	7th Lok Sabha	10,171,194	51	-	85
1984	8th Lok Sabha	17,391,831	83	-	85
1989	9th Lok Sabha	12,393,934	15	-	85
1991	10th Lok Sabha	6,755,015	5	-	85
1996	11th Lok Sabha	3,746,505	5	-	85
1998	12th Lok Sabha	3,361,053	0	-	85
1999	13th Lok Sabha	8,001,685	10	-	85
2004	14th Lok Sabha	6,412,293	9	-	80
2009	15th Lok Sabha	data not available	21	-	80
2014	16th Lok Sabha	data not available	2		80
2019	17th Lok Sabha	54,57,269	1	67	80
2024	18th Lok Sabha		6		80

=== Uttarakhand ===
==== Legislative Assembly Election ====
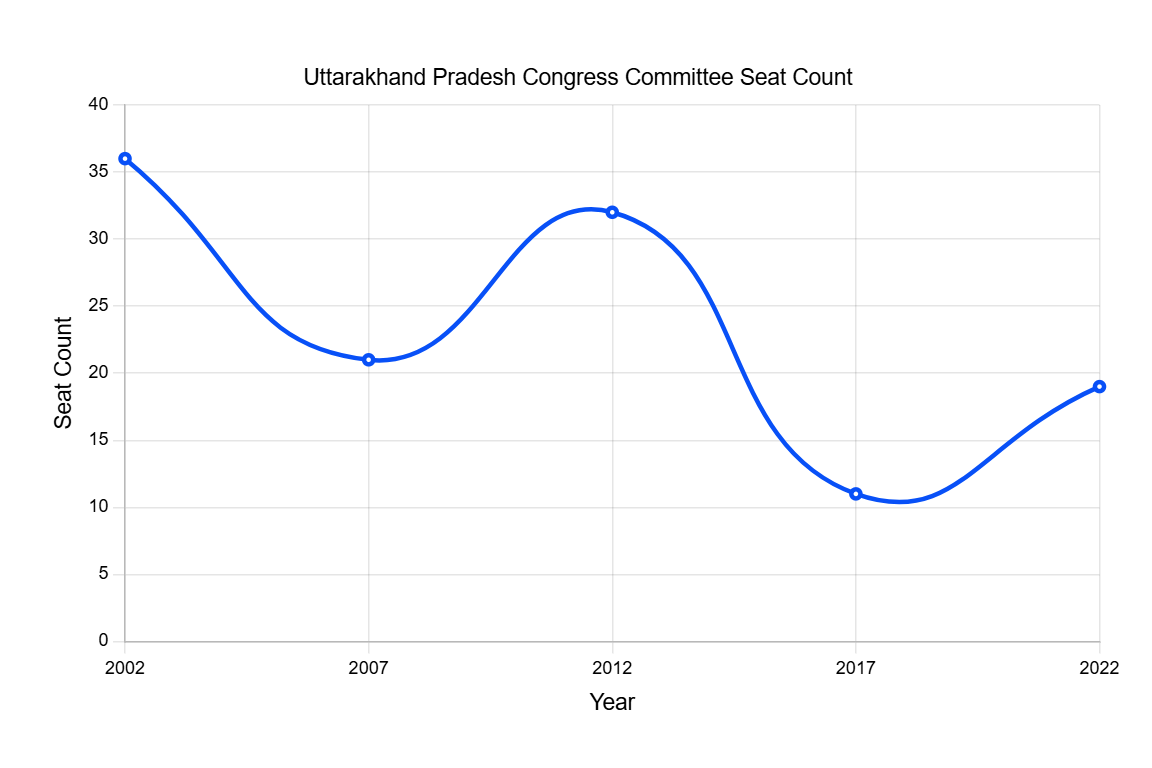
All time seat count of the Indian National Congress in Uttarakhand.

Year	Assembly Election	Votes Polled	Seats Won	Seat Contested	Total Seats
2002	1st Vidhan Sabha	7,69,991	36	70	70
2007	2nd Vidhan Sabha	1,116,511	21	70	70
2012	3rd Vidhan Sabha	14,36,042	32	70	70
2017	4th Vidhan Sabha	16,65,664	11	70	70
2022	5th Vidhan Sabha	20,38,509	19	70	70

==== General Election ====
Year	General Election	Votes Polled	Seats Won	Seat Contested	Total Seats
2004	14th Lok Sabha	1,024,062	1	5	5
2009	15th Lok Sabha	1,354,468	5	5	5
2014	16th Lok Sabha	1,494,440	0	5	5
2019	17th Lok Sabha	15,20,767	0	5	5
2024	18th Lok Sabha	15,64,258	0	5	5

=== West Bengal ===
==== Legislative Assembly Elections ====
Year	Assembly Election	Votes Polled	Seats Won	Seat Contested	Total Seats
1951	1st Assembly	2,889,994	150	236	238
1957	2nd Assembly	4,830,992	152	251	252
1962	3rd Assembly	4,522,476	157	252	252
1967	4th Assembly	5,207,930	127	280	280
1969	5th Assembly	5,538,622	55	-	280
1971	6th Assembly	3,767,314	105	-	280
1972	7th Assembly	6,543,251	216	-	280
1977	8th Assembly	3,298,063	20	-	294
1982	9th Assembly	8,035,272	49	250	294
1987	10th Assembly	10,989,520	40	294	294
1991	11th Assembly	10,875,834	43	284	294
1996	12th Assembly	14,523,964	82	288	294
2001	13th Assembly	2,921,156	26	60	294
2006	14th Assembly	-	21	262	294
2011	15th Assembly	-	42	65	294
2016	16th Assembly	6,700,938	44	92	295
2021	17th Assembly	1,757,131	0	91	294
2026	18th Assembly	1,894,984	2	293	294

==== General Election ====
Year	General Election	Votes Polled	Seats Won	Seat Contested	Total Seats
1951	1st Lok Sabha	3,205,162	24	-	
1957	2nd Lok Sabha	5,031,696	23	-	
1962	3rd Lok Sabha	4,553,677	22	-	
1967	4th Lok Sabha	5,105,170	14	-	
1971	5th Lok Sabha	3,687,665	13	-	
1977	6th Lok Sabha	4,312,418	3	-	
1980	7th Lok Sabha	7,500,578	4	-	
1984	8th Lok Sabha	12,227,863	16	-	
1989	9th Lok Sabha	13,100,945	4	-	
1991	10th Lok Sabha	10,834,675	5	-	
1996	11th Lok Sabha	14,711,538	9	-	
1998	12th Lok Sabha	5,551,456	1	-	
1999	13th Lok Sabha	4,688,932	3	-	42
2004	14th Lok Sabha	5,385,754	6	-	42
2009	15th Lok Sabha	-	6	-	42
2014	16th Lok Sabha	-	4	-	42
2024	18th Lok Sabha		1	13	42

=== Dadra and Nagar Haveli ===
General Elections

Year	General Election	Votes Polled	Seats Won	Seat Contested	Total Seats
1967	4th Lok Sabha	10,654	1	1	1
1971	5th Lok Sabha	8,484	1	1	1
1977	6th Lok Sabha	11,324	1	1	1
1980	7th Lok Sabha	19,277	1	1	1
1984	8th Lok Sabha	15,471	0	1	1
1989	9th Lok Sabha	14,875	0	1	1
1991	10th Lok Sabha	29,907	1	1	1
1996	11th Lok Sabha	39,384	1	1	1
1998	12th Lok Sabha	2,997	0	1	1
1999	13th Lok Sabha	10,601	0	1	1
2004	14th Lok Sabha	21,772	0	1	1
2009	15th Lok Sabha	50,624	0	1	1
2014	16th Lok Sabha	74,576	0	1	1
2019	17th Lok Sabha	8,608	0	1	1
2024	18th Lok Sabha	63,490	0	1	1

=== Daman and Diu ===
==== General Elections ====
Year	General Election	Votes Polled	Seats Won	Seat Contested	Total Seats
1989	9th Lok Sabha	13,807	0	1	1
1991	10th Lok Sabha	8,623	0	1	1
1996	11th Lok Sabha	24,543	1	1	1
1998	12th Lok Sabha	1,020	0	1	1
1999	13th Lok Sabha	25,136	1	1	1
2004	14th Lok Sabha	27,523	1	1	1
2009	15th Lok Sabha	19,708	0	1	1
2014	16th Lok Sabha	37,738	0	1	1
2019	17th Lok Sabha	27,655	0	1	1
2024	18th Lok Sabha	11,258	0	1	1

=== Puducherry ===
==== Legislative Assembly ====
Electoral performance of Congress in Puducherry Assembly
Highest seats in Year:1964
Lowest seats in Year: 2026

Year	Assembly Election	Votes Polled	Seats Won	Seat Contested	Total Seats	Outcome
1963 (Note: The Representative Assembly was converted into the Legislative Assembly of Pondicherry on 1 July 1963 and its members were deemed to have been elected to the Assembly. Thus, the First Legislative Assembly was formed without an election. Elections for the assembly have been held since 1964.)	1st Assembly	N.A.	21	39	39	Government
1964	2nd Assembly	91,338	22	30	30	Government
1969	3rd Assembly	-	10	-	30	
1974	4th Assembly	-	7	-	30	
1977	5th Assembly	39,343	2	-	30	
1980	6th Assembly	58,680	10	-	30	
1985	7th Assembly	98,601	15	-	30	Government
1990	8th Assembly	105,207	11	-	30	
1991	9th Assembly	117,289	15	-	30	Government
1996	10th Assembly	116,618	9	-	30	
2001	11th Assembly	108,700	11	-	30	Government
2006	12th Assembly		10	-	30	Government
2011	13th Assembly		7	17	30	Opposition
2016	14th Assembly	244,886	15	21	30	Government
2021	15th Assembly		2	14	30	Opposition
2026	16th Assembly		1	21	30	Opposition

==== General Elections ====
Year	General Election	Votes Polled	Seats Won	Seat Contested	Total Seats
1980	7th Lok Sabha	164,589	1	1	1
1984	8th Lok Sabha	159,376	1	1	1
1989	9th Lok Sabha	190,562	1	1	1
1991	10th Lok Sabha	207,922	1	1	1
1996	11th Lok Sabha	1,986	1	1	1
1998	12th Lok Sabha	131,348	0	1	1
1999	13th Lok Sabha	165,108	1	1	1
2004	13th Lok Sabha	-	1	1	1
2009	15th Lok Sabha	-	1	1	1
2014	16th Lok Sabha	-	0	1	1
2019	17th Lok Sabha	444,981	1	1	1
2024	18th Lok Sabha		1	1	1

== Former States ==
=== Ajmer ===
Year	General Election	Votes Polled	Seats Won	Seat Contested	Total Seats
1951	1st Assembly	104,411	20	30	30
1951	1st Lok Sabha	89,761	2		

=== Bhopal ===
Year	General Election	Votes Polled	Seats Won	Seat Contested	Total Seats
1951	1st Assembly	117,656	25	28	30
1951	1st Lok Sabha	97,292	2		

=== Bombay ===
Year	General Election	Votes Polled	Seats Won
1951	1st Assembly	5,556,334	269
1951	1st Lok Sabha	5,781,277	40
1957	2nd Assembly	8,131,604	234
1957	2nd Lok Sabha	8,156,272	38

=== Coorg ===
Year	General Election	Votes Polled	Seats Won	Seat Contested	Total Seats
1951	1st Assembly	48,845	15	24	24
1951	1st Lok Sabha	38,063	1		

=== Kutch ===
Year	General Election	Votes Polled	Seats Won
1951	1st Lok Sabha	78,771	2

=== Madhya Bharat ===
Year	General Election	Votes Polled	Seats Won	Seat Contested	Total Seats
1951	1st Assembly	938,918	75	99	99
1951	1st Lok Sabha	992,159	9		

=== Patiala and East Punjab States Union ===
Year	General Election	Votes Polled	Seats Won	Seat Contested	Total Seats
1951	1st Assembly	388,185	26	51	60
1951	1st Lok Sabha	492,408	2		
1954	2nd Assembly	696,979	37		

=== Saurashtra ===
Year	General Election	Votes Polled	Seats Won
1951	1st Assembly	606,934	55
1951	1st Lok Sabha	506,112	6

=== Vindhya Pradesh ===
Year	General Election	Votes Polled	Seats Won	Seat Contested	Total Seats
1951	1st Assembly	270,013	40	56	60
1951	1st Lok Sabha	238,220	4		
1957	2nd Lok Sabha	253,241	1		

== See also ==
- Electoral history of the Bharatiya Janata Party
- Electoral history of the Communist Party of India
- Electoral history of the Communist Party of India (Marxist)
- Electoral history of Indira Gandhi
- Electoral history of Rahul Gandhi
