= List of candidates in the 2022 Uttar Pradesh Legislative Assembly election =

2022 Uttar Pradesh Legislative Assembly election were held from 10 February to 7 March 2022, in seven phases, to elect all 403 members of the Uttar Pradesh Legislative Assembly. The votes were counted and the results were declared on 10 March 2022.

The following is a list of candidates from major parties and alliances contesting in the election. This is not an exhaustive list of all the candidates in the election.

== Constituency No. 1-42 ==
Constituency		Voting Date	NDA		SP+		BSP		UPA	
#	Name	Voting Date	Party	Candidate	Party	Candidate	Party	Candidate	Party	Candidate
Saharanpur District
1	Behat	14 February 2022	BJP	Naresh Saini	SP	Umar Ali Khan	BSP	Rahish Malik	INC	Poonam Khamboj
2	Nakur	14 February 2022	BJP	Mukesh Chaudhary	SP	Dr. Dharam Singh Saini	BSP	Sahil Khan	INC	Randhir Singh
3	Saharanpur Nagar	14 February 2022	BJP	Rajiv Gumber	SP	Sanjay Garg	BSP	Manish Arora	INC	Sukhwinder Kaur
4	Saharanpur	14 February 2022	BJP	Jagpal Singh	SP	Ashu Malik	BSP	Ajab Singh	INC	Sandeep Rana
5	Deoband	14 February 2022	BJP	Brijesh Singh Rawat	SP	Karthik Rana	BSP	Ch Rajender Singh	INC	Raahat Khalil
6	Rampur Maniharan (SC)	14 February 2022	BJP	Devendra Kumar Nim	RLD	Vivek Kant	BSP	Ravinder Molhu	INC	Ompal Singh
7	Gangoh	14 February 2022	BJP	Kirat Singh Gurjar	SP	Ch. Indersen	BSP	Nauman Masood	INC	Ashok Saini
Shamli District
8	Kairana	10 February 2022	BJP	Mriganka Singh	SP	Nahid Hassan	BSP	Rajendra Singh Upadhyaya	INC	Haji Akhlaq
9	Thana Bhawan	10 February 2022	BJP	Suresh Rana	RLD	Ashraf Ali	BSP	Jaheer Malik	INC	Satya Sayyam Saini
10	Shamli	10 February 2022	BJP	Tejendra Nirwal	RLD	Prasun Choudhary	BSP	Bijendra Malik	INC	Mohd.Ayub Jang
Muzaffarnagar District
11	Budhana	10 February 2022	BJP	Umesh Malik	RLD	Rajpal Baliyan	BSP	Anees Chaudhary	INC	Devendra Kashyap
12	Charthawal	10 February 2022	BJP	Sapna Vijay Kashyap	SP	Pankaj Kumar Malik	BSP	Salman Saeed	INC	Yasmeen Rana
13	Purqazi (SC)	10 February 2022	BJP	Pramod Utwal	RLD	Anil Kumar	BSP	Surendra Pal Singh	INC	Deepak Kumar
14	Muzaffarnagar	10 February 2022	BJP	Kapil Dev Aggarwal	RLD	Saurabh Swaroop	BSP	Pushpankar Pal	INC	Subodh Sharma
15	Khatauli	10 February 2022	BJP	Vikram Singh Saini	RLD	Rajpal Singh Saini	BSP	Kartar Singh Bhadana	INC	Gaurav Bhati
16	Meerapur	10 February 2022	BJP	Prashant Chaudhary	RLD	Chandan Chauhan	BSP	Mohd Shalim	INC	Jamil Ahmad Qasmi
Bijnor District
17	Najibabad	14 February 2022	BJP	Kunwar Bharatendra Singh	SP	Taslim Ahmed	BSP	Shahnwaz Alam	INC	Haji Mohammad Salim Ansari
18	Nagina (SC)	14 February 2022	BJP	Dr. Yashwant	SP	Manoj Paras	BSP	Brajpal Singh	INC	Henrita Rajeev Singh
19	Barhapur	14 February 2022	BJP	Kunwar Sushant Singh	SP	Kapil Kumar	BSP	Mohammad Gazi	INC	Hazi Ahsan Ali Ansari
20	Dhampur	14 February 2022	BJP	Ashok Kumar Rana	SP	Naim Ul Hasan	BSP	Kamal Ahmad	INC	Hussain Ahmad Ansari
21	Nehtaur (SC)	14 February 2022	BJP	Om Kumar	RLD	Munshi Rampal	BSP	Priya Singh	INC	Meenakshi Singh
22	Bijnor	14 February 2022	BJP	Suchi Chaudhary	RLD	Neeraj Choudhary	BSP	Ruchi Veera	INC	Akbari Begum
23	Chandpur	14 February 2022	BJP	Kamlesh Saini	SP	Swami Omvesh	BSP	Shakeel Hashmi	INC	Uday Tyagi(Michael)
24	Noorpur	14 February 2022	BJP	C.P. Singh	SP	Ram Avtar Saini	BSP	Ziauddeen Ansari	INC	Bala Devi Saini
Moradabad District
25	Kanth	14 February 2022	BJP	Rajesh Kumar Singh	SP	Kamal Akhtar	BSP	Afaaq Ali Khan	INC	Mohd Israr Saifi
26	Thakurdwara	14 February 2022	BJP	Ajay Pratap Singh	SP	Nawab Jan	BSP	Mujahid Ali	INC	Salma Agha Ansari
27	Moradabad Rural	14 February 2022	BJP	Krishankant Mishra	SP	Nasir Qureshi	BSP	Aqeel Choudhary	INC	Haji Ikram Qureshi
28	Moradabad Nagar	14 February 2022	BJP	Ritesh Kumar Gupta	SP	Yusuf Ansari	BSP	Irshaad Hussain Saifi	INC	Mohd Rizwan Qureshi
29	Kundarki	14 February 2022	BJP	Kamal Prajapati	SP	Ziaur Rehman Barq	BSP	Haji Chand Babu Malik	INC	Dharaksha Ahsan Khan
30	Bilari	14 February 2022	BJP	Parmeshwar Lal Saini	SP	Mohd.Faheem Irfan	BSP	Anil Kumar Chaudhary	INC	Kalpana Singh
Sambhal District
31	Chandausi (SC)	14 February 2022	BJP	Gulabo Devi	SP	Vimlesh Kumar	BSP	Ranvijay Singh	INC	Mithlesh
32	Asmoli	14 February 2022	BJP	Harendra Singh	SP	Pinky Singh Yadav	BSP	Rafatulla urf Neta Chhidda	INC	Hazi Marghoob Alam
33	Sambhal	14 February 2022	BJP	Rajesh Singhal	SP	Iqbal Mahmood	BSP	Shaqil Ahmad Quraishi	INC	Nida Ahmad
Rampur District
34	Suar	14 February 2022	AD(S)	Haider Ali Khan	SP	Abdullah Azam Khan	BSP	Adhyapak Shankar Lal Saini	INC	Ram Rakhshpal Singh
35	Chamraua	14 February 2022	BJP	Mohan Kumar Lodhi	SP	Naseer Ahmed Khan	BSP	Abdul Mustafa Husain	INC	Yusuf Ali Yusuf
36	Bilaspur	14 February 2022	BJP	Baldev Singh Aulakh	SP	Sardar Amarjit Singh	BSP	Ramavtar Kashyap	INC	Sanjay Kapoor
37	Rampur	14 February 2022	BJP	Akash Saxena	SP	Azam Khan	BSP	Sadakat Hussain	INC	Kazim Ali Khan
38	Milak (SC)	14 February 2022	BJP	Rajbala	SP	Vijay Singh	BSP	Surendra Singh Sagar	INC	Kumar Eklavya Valmiki
Amroha District
39	Dhanaura (SC)	14 February 2022	BJP	Rajeev Tarara	SP	Vivek Singh	BSP	Harpal Singh	INC	Samar Pal Singh
40	Naugawan Sadat	14 February 2022	BJP	Devendra Nagpal	SP	Samar Pal Singh	BSP	Sadab Khan urf Tata	INC	Rekha Sukhraj Rani
41	Amroha	14 February 2022	BJP	Ram Singh Saini	SP	Mehboob Ali	BSP	Mohd Naved Ayaz	INC	Saleem Khan
42	Hasanpur	14 February 2022	BJP	Mahendra Singh Khadagvanshi	SP	Mukhiya Gujjar	BSP	Fire Singh Gurjar	INC	Asim Hussain Sabri

== Constituency No. 43-80 ==
Constituency		Voting Date	NDA		SP+		BSP		UPA	
#	Name	Voting Date	Party	Candidate	Party	Candidate	Party	Candidate	Party	Candidate
Meerut District
43	Siwalkhas	10 February 2022	BJP	Manendra Pal Singh	RLD	Ghulam Mohammed	BSP	Mukaram Ali	INC	Jagdish Sharma
44	Sardhana	10 February 2022	BJP	Sangeet Singh Som	SP	Atul Pradhan	BSP	Sanjeev Dhama	INC	Syed Rianuddin
45	Hastinapur (SC)	10 February 2022	BJP	Dinesh Khatik	SP	Yogesh Verma	BSP	Sanjeev Kumar	INC	Archana Gautam
46	Kithore	10 February 2022	BJP	Satyavir Tyagi	SP	Shahid Manzoor	BSP	Kushal pal Mavi	INC	Babita Gurjar
47	Meerut Cantonment	10 February 2022	BJP	Amit Agarwal	RLD	Manisha Ahlawat	BSP	Amit Sharma	INC	Avinash Kajala
48	Meerut	10 February 2022	BJP	Kamal Dutt Sharma	SP	Rafeeq Ansari	BSP	Dilshad Haji	INC	Ranjan Sharma
49	Meerut South	10 February 2022	BJP	Somendra Tomar	SP	Mohd Adil	BSP	Kunwar Dilshad Ali	INC	Nafees Saifi
Baghpat District
50	Chhaprauli	10 February 2022	BJP	Sahender Singh Ramala	RLD	Prof. Ajay Kumar Singh	BSP	Sahik	INC	Dr Yunus Chaudhary
51	Baraut	10 February 2022	BJP	Krishnapal Malik	RLD	Jaiveer Singh Tomar	BSP	Ankit Sharma	INC	Rahul Kashyap
52	Baghpat	10 February 2022	BJP	Yogesh Dhama	RLD	Ahmed Hameed	BSP	Arun Kasana	INC	Anil Dev Tyagi
Ghaziabad District
53	Loni	10 February 2022	BJP	Nand Kishor Gurjar	RLD	Madan Bhaiya	BSP	Akil Mehmood	INC	Yameen Malik
54	Muradnagar	10 February 2022	BJP	Ajit Pal Tyagi	RLD	Surendra Kumar Munni	BSP	Ayub Khan	INC	Bijendra Yadav
55	Sahibabad	10 February 2022	BJP	Sunil Kumar Sharma	SP	Amarpal Sharma	BSP	Ajeet Kumar Pal	INC	Sangeeta Tyagi
56	Ghaziabad	10 February 2022	BJP	Atul Garg	SP	Vishal Verma	BSP	Krishan Kumar	INC	Sushant Goyal
57	Modinagar	10 February 2022	BJP	Manju Shiwach	RLD	Sudesh Sharma	BSP	Poonam Garg	INC	Neeraj Kumari Prajapati
Hapur District
58	Dholana	10 February 2022	BJP	Dharmesh Singh Tomar	SP	Aslam Choudhary	BSP	Wasid Pradhan	INC	Arvind Sharma
59	Hapur (SC)	10 February 2022	BJP	Vijay Pal	RLD	Gajraj Singh	BSP	Manish Singh	INC	Bhawna Valmiki
60	Garhmukteshwar	10 February 2022	BJP	Harendra Tewatia	SP	Ravinder Chaudhary	BSP	Madan Chauhan	INC	Abha Chaudhary
Gautam Buddha Nagar District
61	Noida	10 February 2022	BJP	Pankaj Singh	SP	Sunil Choudhary	BSP	Kirpa Ram Sharma	INC	Pankhuri Pathak
62	Dadri	10 February 2022	BJP	Tejpal Singh Nagar	SP	Raj Kumar Bhati	BSP	Manbir Bhati	INC	Deepak Bhati Chotiwala
63	Jewar	10 February 2022	BJP	Dhirendra Singh	RLD	Avtar Singh Bhadana	BSP	Narender Bhati	INC	Manoj Chechi
Bulandshahr District
64	Sikandrabad	10 February 2022	BJP	Lakshmi Raj Singh	SP	Rahul Yadav	BSP	Manveer Singh	INC	Saleem Akthar
65	Bulandshahr	10 February 2022	BJP	Pradeep Chaudhary	RLD	Haji Yunus	BSP	Mohd Mobin Qureshi	INC	Sushil Chaudhary
66	Syana	10 February 2022	BJP	Devendra Singh Lodhi	RLD	Dilnawaz Khan	BSP	Sunil Bhardwaj	INC	Poonam Pandit
67	Anupshahr	10 February 2022	BJP	Sanjay Sharma	NCP	KK Sharma	BSP	Rameshwar	INC	Gajendra Singh
68	Debai	10 February 2022	BJP	Chandrapal Singh	SP	Harish Kumar Lodhi	BSP	Karan Pal Singh	INC	Sunita Sharma
69	Shikarpur	10 February 2022	BJP	Anil Sharma	RLD	Kiranpal Singh	BSP	MU Rafik	INC	Ziaur Rehman
70	Khurja (SC)	10 February 2022	BJP	Meenakshi Singh	SP	Banshi Singh Pahadiya	BSP	Vinod	INC	Tukki Mal Khatik
Aligarh District
71	Khair (SC)	10 February 2022	BJP	Anoop Pradhan Balmiki	RLD	Bhagwati Prasad	BSP	Charu Kain Kain	INC	Monika Suryawanshi
72	Barauli	10 February 2022	BJP	Thakur Jaivir Singh	RLD	Pramod Gaur	BSP	Narender Sharma	INC	Gaurang Dev Chauhan
73	Atrauli	10 February 2022	BJP	Sandeep Singh	SP	Viresh Yadav	BSP	Dr. Omvir Singh	INC	Dharmendra Kumar
74	Chharra	10 February 2022	BJP	Ravendra Pal Singh	SP	Laxmi Dhangar	BSP	Tilakraj	INC	Akhilesh Sharma
75	Koil	10 February 2022	BJP	Anil Parashar	SP	Shaaz Isaaq	BSP	Mohamad Bilal	INC	Vivek Bansal
76	Aligarh	10 February 2022	BJP	Smt Mukta Raja	SP	Zafar Alam	BSP	Razia Khan	INC	Mohd Salman Imteyaz
77	Iglas (SC)	10 February 2022	BJP	Rajkumar Sahyogi	RLD	Birpal Singh Diwakar	BSP	Sushil Kumar Jatav	INC	Preeti Dhangar
Hathras District
78	Hathras (SC)	20 February 2022	BJP	Anjula Mahor	SP	Brijmohan	BSP	Sanjeev Kumar Kaka	INC	Kuldeep Kumar Singh
79	Sadabad	20 February 2022	BJP	Ramveer Upadhyay	RLD	Pradeep Choudhary	BSP	Dr. Avin Sharma	INC	Mathura Prasad Kushwaha
80	Sikandra Rao	20 February 2022	BJP	Birendra Singh Rana	SP	Lalit Pratap Singh	BSP	Awadhesh Kumar Singh	INC	Dr Chavi Varshney

== Constituency No. 81-110 ==
Constituency		Voting Date	NDA		SP+		BSP		UPA	
#	Name	Voting Date	Party	Candidate	Party	Candidate	Party	Candidate	Party	Candidate
Mathura District
81	Chhata	10 February 2022	BJP	Chaudhary Laxmi Narayan Singh	RLD	Tejpal Singh	BSP	Sonpal	INC	Poonam Devi
82	Mant	10 February 2022	BJP	Rajesh Choudhary	SP	Sanjay Lather	BSP	Shyam Sunder Sharma	INC	Suman Chaudhary
83	Goverdhan	10 February 2022	BJP	Thakur Meghshyam Singh	RLD	Pritam Singh	BSP	Rajkumar Rawat	INC	Deepak Chaudhary
84	Mathura	10 February 2022	BJP	Shrikant Sharma	SP	Devendra Agarwal	BSP	Satish Sharma	INC	Pradeep Mathur
85	Baldev (SC)	10 February 2022	BJP	Pooran Prakash	RLD	Babita Devi	BSP	Ashok Kumar Suman	INC	Vinesh Kumar Valmiki
Agra District
86	Etmadpur	10 February 2022	BJP	Dharampal Singh	SP	Dr.Virendra Singh Chauhan	BSP	Sarvesh Baghel	INC	Shivani Singh Baghel
87	Agra Cantonment (SC)	10 February 2022	BJP	Girraj Singh Dharmesh	SP	Kunwar Singh Vakil	BSP	Bhartendu arun	INC	Sikander Valmiki
88	Agra South	10 February 2022	BJP	Yogendra Upadhyaya	SP	Vinay Aggarwal	BSP	Ravi Bhardwaj	INC	Anuj Sharma
89	Agra North	10 February 2022	BJP	Purshottam Khandelwal	SP	Gyanendra Kumar	BSP	Shabbir Abbas	INC	Vinod Kumar Bansal
90	Agra Rural (SC)	10 February 2022	BJP	Baby Rani Maurya	RLD	Mahesh Kumar Jatav	BSP	Kiran Prabha Kesari	INC	Upendra Singh
91	Fatehpur Sikri	10 February 2022	BJP	Choudhary Babulal	RLD	Brijesh Chahar	BSP	Dr Mukesh Kr Rajput	INC	Hemant Chahar
92	Kheragarh	10 February 2022	BJP	Bhagvan Singh Kushwaha	RLD	Routan Singh	BSP	Gangadhar Singh Kushwaha	INC	Ram Nath Shikarwar
93	Fatehabad	10 February 2022	BJP	Chotelal Verma	SP	Rupali Dixit	BSP	Shailendra Pratap	INC	Hotam Singh Nishad
94	Bah	10 February 2022	BJP	Rani Pakshalika Singh	SP	Madhusudhan Sharma	BSP	Nitin Verma	INC	Manoj Dixit
Firozabad District
95	Tundla (SC)	20 February 2022	BJP	Prempal Singh Dhangar	SP	Rakesh Babu	BSP	Amar Singh Jatav	INC	Yogesh Dikawar
96	Jasrana	20 February 2022	BJP	Manvendra Singh Lodhi	SP	Sachin Yadav	BSP	Surya Pratap Singh	INC	Vijay Nath Singh Varma
97	Firozabad	20 February 2022	BJP	Manish Asiza	SP	Saifur Rehman	BSP	Sajia Hassan	INC	Sandeep Tiwari
98	Shikohabad	20 February 2022	BJP	Om Prakash Verma	SP	Mukesh Verma	BSP	Anil Kumar Yadav	INC	Shashi Sharma
99	Sirsaganj	20 February 2022	BJP	Hariom Yadav	SP	Sarvesh Yadav	BSP	Pankaj Mishra	INC	Pratima Pal
Kasganj District
100	Kasganj	20 February 2022	BJP	Devendra Singh Lodhi	SP	Manpal Singh	BSP	Engg. Prabhudayal Singh Rajput	INC	Kuldeep Pandey
101	Amanpur	20 February 2022	BJP	Hari Om Verma	SP	Satyaman Singh Shakya	BSP	Subhash Chandra Shakya	INC	Divya Sharma
102	Patiyali	20 February 2022	BJP	Mamtesh Shakya	SP	Nadira Sultan	BSP	Neeraj Mishra	INC	Mohd Imran Ali
Etah District
103	Aliganj	20 February 2022	BJP	Satyapal Singh Rathore	SP	Rameshwar Singh Yadav	BSP	Saud Ali Khan	INC	Subhash Chandra Verma
104	Etah	20 February 2022	BJP	Vipin Verma David	SP	Jugendra Singh Yadav	BSP	Ajay Singh Yadav	INC	Gunjan Mishra
105	Marhara	20 February 2022	BJP	Veerendra Verma	SP	Amit Gaurav 'Titu'	BSP	Yogesh Kumar Shakya	INC	Tara Rajput
106	Jalesar	20 February 2022	BJP	Sanjeev Kumar Diwakar	SP	Ranjit Suman	BSP	Akash Singh Jatav	INC	Neelima Raj
Mainpuri District
107	Mainpuri	20 February 2022	BJP	Jaiveer Singh	SP	Raju Yadav	BSP	Gaurav Nand Savita	INC	Vineeta Shakya
108	Bhongaon	20 February 2022	BJP	Ram Naresh Agnihotri	SP	Alok Shakya	BSP	Ashok Singh Chauhan	INC	Mamta Rajput
109	Kishni (SC)	20 February 2022	BJP	Priyaranjan Ashu Diwakar	SP	Brijesh Katheria	BSP	Prabhudayal Jatav	INC	Dr Vinay Narayan Singh
110	Karhal	20 February 2022	BJP	S.P. Singh Baghel	SP	Akhilesh Yadav	BSP	Kuldeep Narayan	(Note: UPA didn't field a candidate against SP+ candidate Akhilesh Yadav in Karhal)	

== Constituency No. 111-136 ==
Constituency		Voting Date	NDA		SP+		BSP		UPA	
#	Name	Voting Date	Party	Candidate	Party	Candidate	Party	Candidate	Party	Candidate
Sambhal District
111	Gunnaur	14 February 2022	BJP	Ajeet Kumar Yadav	SP	Ram Khiladi Singh Yadav	BSP	Firoz	INC	Vijay Sharma
Budaun District
112	Bisauli (SC)	14 February 2022	BJP	Kushagra Sagar	SP	Ashutosh Maurya	BSP	Jaipal Singh	INC	Pragya Yashoda
113	Sahaswan	14 February 2022	BJP	D.K. Bhardwaj	SP	Brijesh Yadav	BSP	Haji Vittan Musarrat	INC	Rajveer Singh Yadav
114	Bilsi	14 February 2022	BJP	Harish Shakya	MD	Chandra Prakash Maurya	BSP	Smt. Mamta Shakya	INC	Ankit Chauhan
115	Badaun	14 February 2022	BJP	Mahesh Chandra Gupta	SP	Raees Ahmad	BSP	Thakur Rajesh Kumar Singh	INC	Rani Singh
116	Shekhupur	14 February 2022	BJP	Dharmendra Kumar Singh Shakya	SP	Himanshu Yadav	BSP	Muslim Khan	INC	Mamta Devi Prajapati
117	Dataganj	14 February 2022	BJP	Rajeev Kumar Singh	SP	Arjun Singh	BSP	Rachit Gupta	INC	Atif Khan Zakhmi
Bareilly District
118	Baheri	14 February 2022	BJP	Chhatra Pal Gangwar	SP	Ataur Rahman	BSP	Aaseram Gangwar	INC	Santosh Bharti
119	Meerganj	14 February 2022	BJP	D. C. Verma	SP	Sultan Baig	BSP	Kunwar Bhanu Pratap Singh Gangwar	INC	Mohd. llyas
120	Bhojipura	14 February 2022	BJP	Bahoran Lal Maurya	SP	Shahzil Islam Ansari	BSP	Yogesh Patel	INC	Sadar Khan
121	Nawabganj	14 February 2022	BJP	M.P. Aarya Gangwar	SP	Bhagwat Saran Gangwar	BSP	Yusuf Khan	INC	Usha Gangwar
122	Faridpur (SC)	14 February 2022	BJP	Shyam Bihari Lal	SP	Vijay Pal Singh	BSP	Shalini Singh	INC	Vishal sagar
123	Bithari Chainpur	14 February 2022	BJP	Raghvendra Sharma	SP	Agam Maurya	BSP	Ashish Patel	INC	Alka Singh
124	Bareilly	14 February 2022	BJP	Arun Saxena	SP	Rajesh Agarwal	BSP	Brihmanand Sharma	INC	Krishna Kant Sharma
125	Bareilly Cantonment	14 February 2022	BJP	Sanjeev Aggarwal	SP	Supriya Aron	BSP	Anil Kumar	INC	Mohd Islam Ansari
126	Aonla	14 February 2022	BJP	Dharmpal Singh	SP	Pt. R.K Sharma	BSP	Laxman Prasad Lodhi	INC	Omveer Yadav
Pilibhit District
127	Pilibhit	23 February 2022	BJP	Sanjay Singh Gangwar	SP	Dr Shailendra Gangwar	BSP	Anis Khan	INC	Shakeel Ahmed Noori
128	Barkhera	23 February 2022	BJP	Swami Pravakta Nand	SP	Hemraj Verma	BSP	Mohan Swaroop Verma	INC	Harpreet Singh Chabba
129	Puranpur (SC)	23 February 2022	BJP	Babu Ram Paswan	SP	Aarti	BSP	Ashok Kumar Raja	INC	Ishwar Dayal Paswan
130	Bisalpur	23 February 2022	BJP	Vivek Verma	SP	Divya Gangwar	BSP	Anees Khan urf Phoolbabu	INC	Shikha Pandey
Shahjahanpur District
131	Katra	14 February 2022	BJP	Veer Vikram Singh Prince	SP	Rajesh Yadav	BSP	Rajesh Shakya	INC	Munna Singh
132	Jalalabad	14 February 2022	BJP	Hariprakash Verma	SP	Neeraj Maurya	BSP	Anirudh Singh Yadav	INC	Gurmeet Singh
133	Tilhar	14 February 2022	BJP	Salona Kushwaha	SP	Roshan Lal Verma	BSP	Nawab Ali Khan	INC	Rajnish Kumar Gupta
134	Powayan (SC)	14 February 2022	BJP	Chetram Pasi	SP	Upendra Pal	BSP	Udaivir Singh Jatav	INC	Anuj Kumari
135	Shahjahanpur	14 February 2022	BJP	Suresh Kumar Khanna	SP	Tanveer Khan	BSP	Sarvesh Chandra Dhandhu Mishra	INC	Poonam Pandey
136	Dadraul	14 February 2022	BJP	Manvendra Singh	SP	Rajesh Verma	BSP	Chandraketu Maurya	INC	Tanveer Sadar

== Constituency No. 137-191 ==
Constituency		Voting Date	NDA		SP+		BSP		UPA	
#	Name	Voting Date	Party	Candidate	Party	Candidate	Party	Candidate	Party	Candidate
Lakhimpur Kheri District
137	Palia	23 February 2022	BJP	Harvindar Kumar Sahani	SP	Priti Inder Singh	BSP	Narendra Singh	INC	Rishal Ahmad
138	Nighasan	23 February 2022	BJP	Shashank Verma	SP	R. S. Kushwaha	BSP	Manmohan Maurya	INC	Atal Shukla
139	Gola Gokrannath	23 February 2022	BJP	Arvind Giri	SP	Vinay Tiwari	BSP	Shikha Verma	INC	Prahlad Patel
140	Sri Nagar (SC)	23 February 2022	BJP	Manju Tyagi	SP	Ramsaran	BSP	Meera Banu	INC	Chandini
141	Dhaurahra	23 February 2022	BJP	Vinod Shankar Awasthi	SP	Varun Choudhary	BSP	Anand Mohan Trivedi	INC	Jitendri Devi
142	Lakhimpur	23 February 2022	BJP	Yogesh Verma	SP	Utkarsh Verma	BSP	Mohan Bajpai	INC	Dr Ravi Shankhar Trivedi
143	Kasta (SC)	23 February 2022	BJP	Saurabh Singh Sonu	SP	Sunil Kumar 'Lala'	BSP	Sarita Verma	INC	Radheshyam Bhargav
144	Mohammdi	23 February 2022	BJP	Lokendra Pratap Singh	SP	Dawood Ahmed	BSP	Shakeel Ahmed Siddiqui	INC	Ritu Singh
Sitapur District
145	Maholi	23 February 2022	BJP	Shashank Trivedi	SP	Anoop Gupta	BSP	Dr. Rajendra Prasad Verma	INC	Ashish Mishra
146	Sitapur	23 February 2022	BJP	Rajesh Rathour "Guru"	SP	Radheshyam Jaiswal	BSP	Khurshid Ansari	INC	Shameena Shafiq
147	Hargaon (SC)	23 February 2022	BJP	Suresh Rahi	SP	Ramhet Bharti	BSP	Ranoo Choudhary	INC	Dr Mamta Verma
148	Laharpur	23 February 2022	BJP	Suneel Verma	SP	Anil Verma	BSP	Mohd Junaid Ansari	INC	Anupama Dwivedi
149	Biswan	23 February 2022	BJP	Nirmal Verma	SP	Afzal Kausar	BSP	Hashim Ali	INC	Vandana Bhargava
150	Sevata	23 February 2022	BJP	Gyan Tiwari	SP	Mahendra Singh	BSP	Ashish Pratap Singh	INC	Dr Vijaynath Awasthi
151	Mahmoodabad	23 February 2022	BJP	Asha Maurya	SP	Narendra Verma	BSP	Meesam Ammar Rizvi	INC	Usha Devi Verma
152	Sidhauli (SC)	23 February 2022	BJP	Maneesh Rawat	SP	Hargovind Bhargava	BSP	Pushpendra Kumar	INC	Kamla Rawat
153	Misrikh (SC)	23 February 2022	BJP	Ram Krishna Bhargava	SBSP	Manoj Rajvanshi	BSP	Shyam Kishore	INC	Subhash Chandra Rajvanshi
Hardoi District
154	Sawaijpur	23 February 2022	BJP	Kunvar Madhavendra Pratap	SP	Padmaraj Singh Yadav	BSP	Rahul Tiwary	INC	Rajvardhan Singh Raju
155	Shahabad	23 February 2022	BJP	Rajani Tiwari	SP	Asif Khan Babbu	BSP	Ahibaran Singh Lodhi	INC	Azimushhan
156	Hardoi	23 February 2022	BJP	Nitin Agrawal	SP	Anil Verma	BSP	Shobhit Pathak	INC	Ashish Kumar Singh
157	Gopamau (SC)	23 February 2022	BJP	Shyam Prakash	SP	Rajeshwari	BSP	Sarvesh kumar Janseva	INC	Sunita Devi
158	Sandi (SC)	23 February 2022	BJP	Prabhash Verma	SP	Usha Verma	BSP	Kamal Verma	INC	Akansha Verma
159	Bilgram-Mallanwan	23 February 2022	BJP	Ashish Kumar Singh	SP	Brijesh Kumar Verma	BSP	Krishna Kumar Singh urf Satish Verma	INC	Subhash Pal
160	Balamau (SC)	23 February 2022	BJP	Rampal Verma	SP	Rambali Verma	BSP	Tilak Chandra Rao	INC	Surendra Kumar
161	Sandila	23 February 2022	BJP	Alka Arkavanshi	SBSP	Sunil Arkvanshi	BSP	Abdul Mannan	INC	Mohd Haneef (Babloo Goshi)
Unnao District
162	Bangarmau	23 February 2022	BJP	Shrikant Katiyar	SP	Munna Alvi	BSP	Ramkishore Pal	INC	Arti Bajpai
163	Safipur (SC)	23 February 2022	BJP	Bamba Lal Diwakar	SP	Sudhir Rawat	BSP	Rajendra Gautam	INC	Shankar Lal Gautam
164	Mohan (SC)	23 February 2022	BJP	Brijesh Kumar Rawat	SP	Dr Aanchal Verma	BSP	Vinay Choudhary	INC	Madhu Rawat
165	Unnao	23 February 2022	BJP	Pankaj Gupta	SP	Abhinav Kumar	BSP	Devendra Singh	INC	Asha Singh
166	Bhagwantnagar	23 February 2022	BJP	Ashutosh Shukla	SP	Er. Ankit Parihar	BSP	Brij Kishore Verma	INC	Jang Bahadur Singh
167	Purwa	23 February 2022	BJP	Anil Singh	SP	Uday Raj Yadav	BSP	Vinod Kumar Tripathi	INC	Urusha Rana
Lucknow District
168	Malihabad (SC)	23 February 2022	BJP	Jai Devi	SP	Surendra kumar	BSP	Jagdish Rawat	INC	Indal Kumar Rawat
169	Bakshi Ka Talab	23 February 2022	BJP	Yogesh Shukla	SP	Gomti Yadav	BSP	Salauddin Siddiqui	INC	Lalan Kumar
170	Sarojini Nagar	23 February 2022	BJP	Rajeshwar Singh	SP	Abhishek Mishra	BSP	Mohammad Jalees Khan	INC	Rudra Daman Singh
171	Lucknow West	23 February 2022	BJP	Anjani Shrivastav	SP	Armaan	BSP	Kayam Raza Khan	INC	Shahana Siddique
172	Lucknow North	23 February 2022	BJP	Neeraj Bora	SP	Pooja Shukla	BSP	Mohd Sarwar Malik	INC	Ajay Srivatsava (Ajju)
173	Lucknow East	23 February 2022	BJP	Ashutosh Tandon	SP	Anurag Bhadouria	BSP	Ashish Kumar Sinha	INC	Manoj Tiwari
174	Lucknow Central	23 February 2022	BJP	Rajneesh Gupta	SP	Ravidas Mehrotra	BSP	Ashish Chandra Srivastava	INC	Sadaf Jafar
175	Lucknow Cantonment	23 February 2022	BJP	Brajesh Pathak	SP	Surendra Singh Gandhi	BSP	Anil Pandey	INC	Dilpreet Singh
176	Mohanlalganj (SC)	23 February 2022	BJP	Amaresh Kumar	SP	Sushila saroj	BSP	Devendra Kumar Saroj	INC	Mamta Chaudhary
Raebareli District
177	Bachhrawan (SC)	23 February 2022	AD(S)	Laxmikant Rawat	SP	Shyam Sunder Bharti	BSP	Lajwanti Kuril	INC	Sushil Pasi
Amethi District
178	Tiloi	27 February 2022	BJP	Mayankeshwar Sharan Singh	SP	Naeem Gurjar	BSP	Harivansh Kumar Dubey	INC	Pradeep Singhal
Raebareli District
179	Harchandpur	23 February 2022	BJP	Rakesh Singh	SP	Rahul Lodhi	BSP	Sher Bahadur Singh Lodhi	INC	Surendra Vikram Singh
180	Rae Bareli	23 February 2022	BJP	Aditi Singh	SP	Ram Pratap Yadav	BSP	Mohammad Ashraf	INC	Dr Manish Singh Chauhan
181	Salon (SC)	27 February 2022	BJP	Ashok Kori	SP	Jagdish Prasad	BSP	Engg. Shawati Singh Katheriya	INC	Arjun Pasi
182	Sareni	23 February 2022	BJP	Dhirendra Bahadur Singh	SP	Devendra Pratap Singh	BSP	Thakur Prasad Yadav	INC	Sudha Dwivedi
183	Unchahar	23 February 2022	BJP	Amarpal Maurya	SP	Manoj Pandey	BSP	Kumari Anjali Maurya	INC	Atul Singh
Amethi District
184	Jagdishpur (SC)	27 February 2022	BJP	Suresh Pasi	SP	Rachana Kori	BSP	Jitendra Kumar Saroj	INC	Vijay Pasi
185	Gauriganj	27 February 2022	BJP	Chandraprakash Mishra Matiyari	SP	Rakesh Pratap Singh	BSP	RamLakhan Shukla	INC	Mohd Fateh Bahadur
186	Amethi	27 February 2022	BJP	Sanjaya Sinh	SP	Maharaji Prajapati	BSP	Ragini Tiwary	INC	Ashish Shukla
Sultanpur District
187	Isauli	27 February 2022	BJP	Om Prakash Pandey	SP	Mohammad Tahir Khan	BSP	Yashbhadra Singh Urf Monu Singh	INC	B M Yadav
188	Sultanpur	27 February 2022	BJP	Vinod Singh	SP	Anoop Sanda	BSP	Dr. Devi Sahay Mishra	INC	Firoz Ahmed Khan
189	Sadar	27 February 2022	NISHAD	Raj Prasad Upadhyay	SP	Arun Verma	BSP	Shri O.P. Lion	INC	Abhishek Singh Rana
190	Lambhua	27 February 2022	BJP	Sitaram Verma	SP	Santosh Pandey	BSP	Udraj Verma Urf Pankaj	INC	Vinay Vikram Singh
191	Kadipur (SC)	27 February 2022	BJP	Rajesh Gautam	SP	Bhagelu Ram	BSP	Hiralal Gautam	INC	Niklesh Saroj

== Constituency No. 192-243 ==
Constituency		Voting Date	NDA		SP+		BSP		UPA	
#	Name	Voting Date	Party	Candidate	Party	Candidate	Party	Candidate	Party	Candidate
Farrukhabad District
192	Kaimganj	20 February 2022	AD(S)	Surabhi	SP	Sarvesh Ambedkar	BSP	Durga Prasad	INC	Shakuntala Devi
193	Amritpur	20 February 2022	BJP	Sushil Kumar Shakya	SP	Dr. Jitendra Yadav	BSP	Amit Kumar urf Rahul Kushwaha	INC	Shubham Tiwari
194	Farrukhabad	20 February 2022	BJP	Sunil Dutt Dwivedi	MD	Suman Shakya	BSP	Vijay Kumar Katiyar	INC	Louise Khurshid
195	Bhojpur	20 February 2022	BJP	Nagendra Singh Rathore	SP	Arshad Jamal Siddiqui	BSP	Alok Verma	INC	Archana Rathore
Kannauj District
196	Chhibramau	20 February 2022	BJP	Archana Pandey	SP	Arvind Yadav	BSP	Vahida Bano Juhi	INC	Vijay Kumar Mishra
197	Tirwa	20 February 2022	BJP	Kailash Singh Rajput	SP	Anil Pal	BSP	Ajay Kumar Verma	INC	Neelam Shakya
198	Kannauj (SC)	20 February 2022	BJP	Asim Arun	SP	Anil Kumar Dohare	BSP	Samarjit Singh	INC	Vineeta Devi
Etawah District
199	Jaswantnagar	20 February 2022	BJP	Vivek Shakya	PSP(L)	Shivpal Singh Yadav	BSP	Brijendra Pratap Singh	(Note: UPA didn't field a candidate against SP+ candidate Shivpal Singh Yadav in Jaswantnagar)	
200	Etawah	20 February 2022	BJP	Sarita Bhadauria	SP	Sarvesh Shakya	BSP	Kuldeep Gupta Santu	INC	Mohd Rashid
201	Bharthana (SC)	20 February 2022	BJP	Sidharth Shanker	SP	Raghavendra Gautam	BSP	Kamlesh Ambedkar	INC	Snehlata Dohre
Auraiya District
202	Bidhuna	20 February 2022	BJP	Riya Shakya	SP	Rekha	BSP	Gaurav Singh	INC	Suman Vyas
203	Dibiyapur	20 February 2022	BJP	Lakhan Singh	SP	Pradeep Kumar Yadav	BSP	Arun Kumar Dubey	INC	Manoj Kumar Pal
204	Auraiya	20 February 2022	BJP	Gudiya Khateriya	SP	Jitendra Dohre	BSP	Ravi Shastri Dohare	INC	Sarita Dohre
Kanpur Dehat District
205	Rasulabad (SC)	20 February 2022	BJP	Poonam Sankhwar	SP	Kamlesh Chandra Diwakar	BSP	Seema Shankhwar	INC	Manorma Shankhwar
206	Akbarpur-Raniya	20 February 2022	BJP	Pratibha Shukla	SP	R.P Kushwaha	BSP	Vinod Kumar Pal	INC	Amrish Singh Gaur
207	Sikandra	20 February 2022	BJP	Ajit Singh Pal	SP	Prabhakar Pandey	BSP	Lalji Shukla	INC	Naresh Katiyar
208	Bhognipur	20 February 2022	BJP	Rakesh Sachan	SP	Narendra Pal Singh	BSP	Junaid Khan	INC	Govind Nishad
Kanpur Nagar District
209	Bilhaur (SC)	20 February 2022	BJP	Rahul Sonkar	SP	Rachna Singh	BSP	Madhu Singh Gautam	INC	Usha Rani Kori
210	Bithoor	20 February 2022	BJP	Abhijeet Singh Sanga	SP	Munendra Shukla	BSP	Ramesh Singh Yadav	INC	Ashok Kumar Nishad
211	Kalyanpur	20 February 2022	BJP	Neelima Katiyar	SP	Satish Kumar Nigam	BSP	Arun Kumar Mishra	INC	Neha Tiwari
212	Govindnagar	20 February 2022	BJP	Surendra Maithani	SP	Samrat Vikas	BSP	Ashok Kumar Kaliya	INC	Karishma Thakur
213	Sishamau	20 February 2022	BJP	Salil Vishnoi	SP	Haji Irfan Solanki	BSP	Rajneesh Kumar Tiwary	INC	Haji Sohail Ahmed
214	Arya Nagar	20 February 2022	BJP	Suresh Awasthi	SP	Amitabh Bajpai	BSP	Dr. Aditya Jaiswal	INC	Pramod Kumar Jaiswal
215	Kidwai Nagar	20 February 2022	BJP	Mahesh Trivedi	SP	Abhimanyu Gupta	BSP	Mohan Mishra	INC	Ajay Kapoor
216	Kanpur Cantonment	20 February 2022	BJP	Raghunandan Singh Bhadauria	SP	Mohd Hassan Rumi	BSP	Mohammad Safi Khan	INC	Sohil Akhtar Ansari
217	Maharajpur	20 February 2022	BJP	Satish Mahana	SP	Fateh Bahadur Singh	BSP	Surrender Pal Singh Chauhan	INC	Kanishka Pandey
218	Ghatampur (SC)	20 February 2022	AD(S)	Saroj Kureel	SP	Bhagwati Prasad Sagar	BSP	Prashant Ahirwar	INC	Raj Narayan Kureel
Jalaun District
219	Madhogarh	20 February 2022	BJP	Moolchandra Singh	SP	Raghavendra Pratap Singh	BSP	Sheetal Kushwaha	INC	Siddharth Devolia
220	Kalpi	20 February 2022	NISHAD	Chhote Singh	SP	Vinod Chaturvedi	BSP	Shyam Pal urf Chunna	INC	Umakanti
221	Orai (SC)	20 February 2022	BJP	Gauri Shankar	SP	Dayashankar Verma	BSP	Satendra Pratap Singh	INC	Urmila Sonkar Khabri
Jhansi District
222	Babina	20 February 2022	BJP	Rajeev Singh "Parichha"	SP	Yashpal Singh Yadav	BSP	Dashrath Singh Rajput	INC	Chandra Shekhar Tiwari
223	Jhansi Nagar	20 February 2022	BJP	Ravi Sharma	SP	Sitaram Kushwaha	BSP	Kailash Sahu	INC	Rahul Richhariya
224	Mauranipur (SC)	20 February 2022	AD(S)	Rashmi Arya	SP	Tilak Ahirwar	BSP	Rohit Ratan Ahirwar	INC	Bhagwan Das Kori
225	Garautha	20 February 2022	BJP	Jawahar Lal Rajpoot	SP	Deepnarayan Singh	BSP	Veer Singh Gurjar	INC	Neha Sanjeev Niranjan
Lalitpur District
226	Lalitpur	20 February 2022	BJP	Ramratan Kushwaha	SP	Ramesh Prasad	BSP	Chandrabhushan Singh Bundela Guddu Raja	INC	Balwant S Lodhi
227	Mehroni (SC)	20 February 2022	BJP	Manohar Lal	SP	Ramvilas Rajak	BSP	Kiran Ramesh Khatik	INC	Brij Lal Khabri
Hamirpur District
228	Hamirpur	20 February 2022	BJP	Manoj Kumar Prajapati	SP	Ram Prakash Prajapati	BSP	Ramphool Nishad	INC	Raj Kumari
229	Rath (SC)	20 February 2022	BJP	Manisha Anuragi	SP	Chandravati	BSP	Prasanna Kumar Ahirwar	INC	Kamlesh Kumar Siwas
Mahoba District
230	Mahoba	20 February 2022	BJP	Rakesh Goswami	SP	Manoj Tiwari	BSP	Sanjay Kumar Sahu	INC	Sagar Singh
231	Charkhari	20 February 2022	BJP	Brijbhushan Rajpoot	SP	Ramjeevan Yadav	BSP	Vinod Kumar Rajput	INC	Nirdosh Dixit
Banda District
232	Tindwari	23 February 2022	BJP	Ramkesh Nishad	SP	Brajesh Prajapati	BSP	Jayram Singh	INC	Adishakti Dikshit
233	Baberu	23 February 2022	BJP	Ajay Patel	SP	Vishambhar Singh Yadav	BSP	Ramsevak Shukla	INC	Gajendra Singh Patel
234	Naraini (SC)	23 February 2022	BJP	Ommani Verma	SP	Kiran Verma	BSP	Gyachran Dinkar	INC	Pawan Devi Kori
235	Banda	23 February 2022	BJP	Prakash Dwivedi	SP	Manjula Singh	BSP	Deeraj Prakash Rajput	INC	Lakshmi Narayan Gupta
Chitrakoot District
236	Chitrakoot	27 February 2022	BJP	Chandrika Prasad Upadhyay	SP	Anil Pradhan Patel	BSP	Pushpendra Singh	INC	Nirmala Bharti
237	Manikpur	27 February 2022	AD(S)	Avinash Chandra Dwivedi	SP	Veer Singh Patel	BSP	Balveer Pal	INC	Rajna Bhartilal Pandey
Fatehpur District
238	Jahanabad	23 February 2022	BJP	Rajendra Singh Patel	SP	Madan Gopal Verma	BSP	Aditya Pandey	INC	Kamala Prajapati
239	Bindki	23 February 2022	AD(S)	Jai Kumar Singh Jaiki	SP	Rameshwar Dayal Gupta 'Dayalu Omer'	BSP	Sushil Kumar Patel	INC	Abhimanyu Singh
240	Fatehpur	23 February 2022	BJP	Vikram Singh	SP	Chandra Prakash Lodhi	BSP	Ayyub Ahmad	INC	Mohd Mohsin Khan
241	Ayah Shah	23 February 2022	BJP	Vikas Gupta	SP	Vishambhar Prasad Nishad	BSP	Chandan Singh urf Chandsen Pal	INC	Hemalata Patel
242	Husainganj	23 February 2022	BJP	Ranvendra Pratap Singh	SP	Usha Maurya	BSP	Farid Ahmed	INC	Shivakant Tiwari
243	Khaga (SC)	23 February 2022	BJP	Krishna Paswan	SP	Ramteerath Paramhansa	BSP	Dusrath Lal Saroj	INC	Om Prakash Gihar

== Constituency No. 244-301 ==
Constituency		Voting Date	NDA		SP+		BSP		UPA	
#	Name	Voting Date	Party	Candidate	Party	Candidate	Party	Candidate	Party	Candidate
Pratapgarh District
244	Rampur Khas	27 February 2022	BJP	Nagesh Pratap Singh	(Note: SP+ didn't field a candidate against UPA candidate Aradhana Misra in Rampur Khas)		BSP	Bankelal Patel	INC	Aradhana Misra
245	Babaganj (SC)	27 February 2022	BJP	Keshav Pasi	SP	Girijesh	BSP	Sushil Kumar Gautam Advocate	INC	Beena Rani
246	Kunda	27 February 2022	BJP	Sindhuja Mishra	SP	Gulshan Yadav	BSP	Mohd Faheem Urf Pappu Bhai	INC	Yogesh Yadav
247	Vishwanathganj	27 February 2022	AD(S)	Jeet Lal Patel	SP	Saurabh Singh	BSP	Sanjay Tripathi	INC	Prashant Singh
248	Pratapgarh	27 February 2022	BJP	Rajendra Maurya	AD(K)	Krishna Patel	BSP	Ashutosh Tripathi	INC	Niraj Tripathi
249	Patti	27 February 2022	BJP	Rajendra Pratap Singh	SP	Ram Singh	BSP	Phoolchandra Mishra	INC	Sunita Singh Patel
250	Raniganj	27 February 2022	BJP	Dhiraj Ojha	SP	R.K Verma	BSP	Ajay Yadav	INC	Maulana Abdul Wahid
Kaushambi District
251	Sirathu	27 February 2022	BJP	Keshav Prasad Maurya	AD(K)	Pallavi Patel	BSP	Santosh Kumar Tripathi	INC	Seema Devi
252	Manjhanpur (SC)	27 February 2022	BJP	Lal Bahadur	SP	Indrajit Saroj	BSP	Dr. Neetu Kanojia	INC	Arun Kumar Vidyarthi
253	Chail	27 February 2022	AD(S)	Nagendra Pratap Singh Patel	SP	Pooja Pal	BSP	Atul Kumar Dwivedi	INC	Talat Azim
Prayagraj District
254	Phaphamau	27 February 2022	BJP	Guruprasad Maurya	SP	Ansar Ahmad	BSP	Om Parkash Patel	INC	Durgesh Pandey
255	Soraon (SC)	27 February 2022	AD(S)	Jamuna Prasad	SP	Geeta Pasi	BSP	Shri Anand Bharti	INC	Manoj Pasi
256	Phulpur	27 February 2022	BJP	Praveen Kumar Patel	SP	Murtaza Siddiqui	BSP	Ramtoulan Yadav	INC	Siddhanath Maurya
257	Pratappur	27 February 2022	AD(S)	Rakesh Dhar Tripathi	SP	Vijma Yadav	BSP	Ghanshyam Pandey	INC	Sanjay Tiwari
258	Handia	27 February 2022	NISHAD	Prashant Singh	SP	Hakim Chandra Bind	BSP	Narendra Kumar Tripathi urf Munna Tripathi	INC	Reena Devi Bind
259	Meja	27 February 2022	BJP	Neelam Karwariya	SP	Sandeep Patel	BSP	Sarvesh Chandra Tiwari urf Baba Tiwari	INC	Shalini Dwivedi
260	Karachhana	27 February 2022	NISHAD	Piyush Ranjan Nishad	SP	Ujjwal Raman Singh	BSP	Aurobindo Kumar urf Bhage Shukla	INC	Rinki Sunil Patel
261	Allahabad West	27 February 2022	BJP	Siddharth Nath Singh	SP	Richa Singh	BSP	Lallan Singh Patel	INC	Tasleemuddin
262	Allahabad North	27 February 2022	BJP	Harshvardhan Bajpai	SP	Sandeep Yadav	BSP	Sanjay Goswami	INC	Anugrah Narayan Singh
263	Allahabad South	27 February 2022	BJP	Nand Gopal Gupta	SP	Raeesh Chandra Shukla	BSP	Devendra Mishra	INC	Alpana Nishad
264	Bara (SC)	27 February 2022	AD(S)	Vachaspati	SP	Ajay Munna	BSP	Dr. Shiv Prakash	INC	Manju Sant
265	Koraon (SC)	27 February 2022	BJP	Rajmani Kol	SP	Ram Dev	BSP	Rajbali Jaisal	INC	Ram Kripal Kol
Barabanki District
266	Kursi	27 February 2022	BJP	Sakendra Pratap Verma	SP	Rakesh Verma	BSP	Meeta Gautam	INC	Urmila Patel
267	Ramnagar	27 February 2022	BJP	Sharad Kumar Awasthi	SP	Farid Mahfuz Kidwai	BSP	Ram Kishore Shukla	INC	Gyanesh Shukla
268	Barabanki	27 February 2022	BJP	Ramkumari Maurya	SP	Dharamraj Singh Yadav	BSP	Dr. Vivek Singh Verma	INC	Roohi Arshad
269	Zaidpur (SC)	27 February 2022	BJP	Amrish Rawat	SP	Gaurav Rawat	BSP	Usha Singh Gautam	INC	Tanuj Punia
270	Dariyabad	27 February 2022	BJP	Satish Chandra Sharma	SP	Arvind Singh Gop	BSP	Jag Prasad Rawat	INC	Chitra Verma
Ayodhya District
271	Rudauli	27 February 2022	BJP	Ram Chandra Yadav	SP	Anand Sen Yadav	BSP	Ehsan Mohammad Ali urf Chaudhary Shahryar	INC	Dayanand Shukla
Barabanki District
272	Haidergarh (SC)	27 February 2022	BJP	Dinesh Rawat	SP	Ram Magan Rawat	BSP	Srichandra Rawat	INC	Nirmala Chaudhary
Ayodhya District
273	Milkipur (SC)	27 February 2022	BJP	Baba Gorakhnath	SP	Awadesh Prasad	BSP	Santosh Kumar urf Suraj Choudhary	INC	Brijesh Kumar
274	Bikapur	27 February 2022	BJP	Amit Singh Chauhan	SP	Firoz Khan	BSP	Sunil Kumar Pathak	INC	Akhilesh Yadav
275	Ayodhya	27 February 2022	BJP	Ved Prakash Gupta	SP	Tej Narayan Pandey	BSP	Ravi Prakash Maurya	INC	Reeta Maurya
276	Goshainganj	27 February 2022	BJP	Aarti Tiwari	SP	Abhay Singh	BSP	Ram Sagar Verma	INC	Sharda Jaiswal
Ambedkar Nagar District
277	Katehari	3 March 2022	NISHAD	Awadesh Dwivedi	SP	Lalji Verma	BSP	Prateek Pandey	INC	Nishant Fatima
278	Tanda	3 March 2022	BJP	Kapil Dev Verma	SP	Ram Murti Verma	BSP	Shabana Khatoon	INC	Syed Mirzauddin Kichauchi
279	Alapur (SC)	3 March 2022	BJP	Triveni Ram	SP	Tribhuvan Dutt	BSP	K D Gautam	INC	Satyamvada Paswan
280	Jalalpur	3 March 2022	BJP	Subhash Rai	SP	Rakesh Pandey	BSP	Rajesh Kumar Singh	INC	Dr. Ragini Pathak
281	Akbarpur	3 March 2022	BJP	Dharmraj Nishad	SP	Ram Achal Rajbhar	BSP	Chandra Prakash Verma	INC	Priyanka Jaiswal
Bahraich District
282	Balha (SC)	27 February 2022	BJP	Saroj Sonkar	SP	Akshaywar Nath Kanoijia	BSP	Ramchandra Prasad	INC	Kiarn Bharti
283	Nanpara	27 February 2022	AD(S)	Ram Niwas Verma	SP	Madhuri Verma	BSP	Hakikat Ali	INC	Dr. Abdul Mohammad Siddique
284	Matera	27 February 2022	BJP	Arun Veer Singh	SP	Mariya Shah	BSP	Akilullah Khan	INC	Ali Akbar
285	Mahasi	27 February 2022	BJP	Sureshwar Singh	SP	Krishna Kumar Ojha	BSP	Dinesh Kumar Shukla	INC	Rajesh Tiwari
286	Bahraich	27 February 2022	BJP	Anupama Jaiswal	SP	Yasir Shah	BSP	Naeem Ahmed Khan	INC	Jai Prakash Mishra
287	Payagpur	27 February 2022	BJP	Subhash Tripathi	SP	Mukesh Srivastav	BSP	Geeta Mishra	INC	Major Rana Shivam Singh
288	Kaiserganj	27 February 2022	BJP	Gaurav Verma	SP	Anand Kumar	BSP	Bakaullah	INC	Geeta Singh
Shrawasti District
289	Bhinga	27 February 2022	BJP	Padamsen Choudhary	SP	Indrani Verma	BSP	Alimuddin Ahmed	INC	Gajala Chaudhri
290	Shravasti	27 February 2022	BJP	Ram Feran Pandey	SP	Mohd. Aslam Raini	BSP	Neetu Mishra	INC	Muhammad Ramjan
Balrampur District
291	Tulsipur	3 March 2022	BJP	Kailash Nath Shukla	SP	Masood Alam	BSP	Bhuwan Pratap Singh	INC	Dipendra Singh (Dipankar)
292	Gainsari	3 March 2022	BJP	Shailesh Kumar Singh	SP	Shiv Pratap Yadav	BSP	Alauddin	INC	Ishtiyak Ahmed Khan
293	Utraula	3 March 2022	BJP	Ram Pratap Verma	JP(S)	Haseeb Hasan Khan	BSP	Ram Pratap	INC	Dhirendra Pratap Singh
294	Balrampur (SC)	3 March 2022	BJP	Palturam	SP	Jagram Paswan	BSP	Hari Ram	INC	Babita Arya
Gonda District
295	Mehnaun	27 February 2022	BJP	Vinay Kumar Dwivedi	SP	Nandita Shukla	BSP	Shivkumar Vishwakarma	INC	Qutbuddin Khan Diamond
296	Gonda	27 February 2022	BJP	Prateek Bhushan Singh	SP	Suraj Singh	BSP	Haji Mohammad Zaki	INC	Rama Kashyap
297	Katra Bazar	27 February 2022	BJP	Bawan Singh	SP	Baijnath Dubey	BSP	Vinod Kumar Shukla	INC	Tahira Begum Tawaaz Khan
298	Colonelganj	27 February 2022	BJP	Ajay Kumar Singh	SP	Yogesh Pratap singh	BSP	Ranjit Kumar Goswami	INC	Triloki Nath Tiwari
299	Tarabganj	27 February 2022	BJP	Prem Narayan Pandey	SP	Rambhajan Choubey	BSP	Lalji Yadav	INC	Twarita Singh
300	Mankapur (SC)	27 February 2022	BJP	Ramapati Shastri	SP	Ramesh Chandra Gautam	BSP	Shree Shyam Narayan	INC	Santosh Kumari
301	Gaura	27 February 2022	BJP	Prabhat Kumar Verma	SP	Sanjay Kumar	BSP	Mrs. Nigaar Usmani	INC	Rampratap Singh

== Constituency No. 302-342 ==
Constituency		Voting Date	NDA		SP+		BSP		UPA	
#	Name	Voting Date	Party	Candidate	Party	Candidate	Party	Candidate	Party	Candidate
Siddharthnagar District
302	Shohratgarh	3 March 2022	AD(S)	Vinay Verma	SBSP	Prem Chand Nishad	BSP	Radha Raman	INC	Chaudhary Ravindra Pratap
303	Kapilvastu (SC)	3 March 2022	BJP	Shyam Dhani Rahi	SP	Vijay Paswan	BSP	Kanhaiya Prasad	INC	Devendra Singh Guddu
304	Bansi	3 March 2022	BJP	Jay Pratap Singh	SP	Monu Dubey	BSP	Radheshyam	INC	Kiran Shukla
305	Itwa	3 March 2022	BJP	Satish Chandra Dwivedi	SP	Mata Prasad Pandey	BSP	Hari Shankar Singh	INC	Arshad Khurshid
306	Domariyaganj	3 March 2022	BJP	Raghvendra Pratap Singh	SP	Saiyada Khatoon	BSP	Ashok Kumar Tewari	INC	Kanti Pandey
Basti District
307	Harraiya	3 March 2022	BJP	Ajay Kumar Singh	SP	Triyambak Pathak	BSP	Raj Kishor Singh	INC	Laboni Singh
308	Kaptanganj	3 March 2022	BJP	Chandra Prakash Shukla	SP	Kavindra Chaudhary	BSP	Zaheer Ahmad	INC	Ambika Singh
309	Rudhauli	3 March 2022	BJP	Sangeeta Pratap Jaiswal	SP	Rajendra Choudhary	BSP	Ashok Kumar	INC	Basant Chaudhary
310	Basti Sadar	3 March 2022	BJP	Dayaram Chaudhary	SP	Mahendra Nath Yadav	BSP	Alok Ranjan Verma	INC	Devendra Kumar Srivastav
311	Mahadewa (SC)	3 March 2022	BJP	Ravi Kumar Sonkar	SBSP	Doodh Ram	BSP	Laxmi Chandra Kharwar	INC	Brijesh Arya
Sant Kabir Nagar District
312	Menhdawal	3 March 2022	NISHAD	Anil Kumar Tripathi	SP	Jairam Pandey	BSP	Mohammad Tabish Khan	INC	Rafiqa Khatoon
313	Khalilabad	3 March 2022	BJP	Ankur Raj Tiwari	SP	Digvijay Narayan Choubey	BSP	Aftab Alam alias Guddu Bhaiya	INC	Amrendra Bhushan
314	Dhanghata (SC)	3 March 2022	BJP	Ganesh Chandra Chauhan	SBSP	Alagu Prasad Chauhan	BSP	Santosh Beldar	INC	Shanti Devi
Maharajganj District
315	Pharenda	3 March 2022	BJP	Bajrang Bahadur Singh	SP	Shanklal Majhi	BSP	Ishoo Chaurasiya	INC	Virendra Chaudhary
316	Nautanwa	3 March 2022	NISHAD	Rishi Tripathi	SP	Kunwar Kaushal Singh	BSP	Aman Mani Tripathi	INC	Sadamohan Upadyay
317	Siswa	3 March 2022	BJP	Prem Sagar Patel	SP	Sushil Tebriwal	BSP	Dhirendra Pratap Singh	INC	Raju Kumar Gupta
318	Maharajganj (SC)	3 March 2022	BJP	Jai Mangal Kanojiya	SBSP	Geeta Ratna Paswan	BSP	Omprakash	INC	Alok Prasad
319	Paniyara	3 March 2022	BJP	Gyanendra Singh	SP	Krishnabhan Singh Sainthwar	BSP	Omprakash Chaurasia	INC	Shardendu Kumar Pandey
Gorakhpur District
320	Caimpiyarganj	3 March 2022	BJP	Fateh Bahadur Singh	SP	Kajal Nishad	BSP	Chandra Prakash Nishad	INC	Surendra Nishad
321	Pipraich	3 March 2022	BJP	Mahendra Pal Singh (politician)	SP	Amrendra Nishad	BSP	Deepak Kumar Agarwal	INC	Suman Chauhan
322	Gorakhpur Urban	3 March 2022	BJP	Yogi Adityanath	SP	Subhawati Shukla	BSP	Khwaja Shamsuddin	INC	Chetna Pandey
323	Gorakhpur Rural	3 March 2022	BJP	Bipin Singh	SP	Vijay Bahadur Yadav	BSP	Dara Singh Nishad	INC	Devendra Nishad
324	Sahajanwa	3 March 2022	BJP	Pradeep Shukla	SP	Yashpal Singh Rawat	BSP	Sudhir Singh	INC	Manoj Yadav
325	Khajani (SC)	3 March 2022	BJP	Sriram Chauhan	SP	Rupawati	BSP	Vidyasagar	INC	Rajni Devi
326	Chauri-Chaura	3 March 2022	NISHAD	Sarvan Kumar Nishad	SP	Captain Brijesh Chandra Lal Paswan	BSP	Virendra	INC	Jitendra Pandey
327	Bansgaon (SC)	3 March 2022	BJP	Vimlesh Paswan	SP	Sanjay Kumar	BSP	Ramnayan Azad	INC	Punam Azad
328	Chillupar	3 March 2022	BJP	Rajesh Tripathi	SP	Vinay Tiwari	BSP	Rajendra Sehi	INC	Sonia Shukla
Kushinagar District
329	Khadda	3 March 2022	NISHAD	Vivek Anand Pandey	SBSP	Ashok Chauhan	BSP	Nisar Ahmed Siddique	INC	Dhananjay Singh Pahalwan
330	Padrauna	3 March 2022	BJP	Manish Jaiswal	SP	Vikram Yadav	BSP	Pawan Kumar Upadhyay	INC	Mohd Jahiruddin
331	Tamkuhi Raj	3 March 2022	NISHAD	Asim Kumar	SP	Uday Narayan	BSP	Sanjay	INC	Ajay Kumar Lallu
332	Fazilnagar	3 March 2022	BJP	Surendra Kushwaha	SP	Swami Prasad Maurya	BSP	Ilyas Ansari	INC	Manoj Singh
333	Kushinagar	3 March 2022	BJP	P. N. Pathak	SP	Rajesh Pratap Rao	BSP	Mukeshwar Prasad	INC	Shyamrati Devi
334	Hata	3 March 2022	BJP	Mohan Verma	SP	Ranvijay Singh Mohan	BSP	Shivang Singh	INC	Amrinder Mal
335	Ramkola (SC)	3 March 2022	BJP	Vinay Gond	SBSP	Purnmasi Dehati	BSP	Vijay Kumar	INC	Shambhu Chaudhry
Deoria District
336	Rudrapur	3 March 2022	BJP	Jai Prakash Nishad	SP	Ram Bhuwal Nishad	BSP	Suresh Tiwari	INC	Akhilesh Pratap Singh
337	Deoria	3 March 2022	BJP	Shalabh Mani Tripathi	SP	Ajay Pratap Singh Sainthwar	BSP	Ramsaran	INC	Purushottam N Singh
338	Pathardeva	3 March 2022	BJP	Surya Pratap Sahi	SP	Brahma Shankar Tripathi	BSP	Parvej Alam	INC	Ambar Jahan
339	Rampur Karkhana	3 March 2022	BJP	Surendra Chaurasia	SP	Ghazala Lari	BSP	Pushpa Shahi	INC	Shehla Ansari
340	Bhatpar Rani	3 March 2022	BJP	Sabha Kumar Kushwaha	SP	Ashutosh Upadhyay	BSP	Ajay	INC	Keshav Chand Yadav
341	Salempur (SC)	3 March 2022	BJP	Vijaylaxmi Gautam	SBSP	Manbodh Prasad	BSP	Rajesh Bharati	INC	Durali Devi
342	Barhaj	3 March 2022	BJP	Deepak Mishra	SP	Murali Manohar Jaiswal	BSP	Vinay Tiwari	INC	Ramji Giri

== Constituency No. 343-403 ==
Constituency		Voting Date	NDA		SP+		BSP		UPA	
#	Name	Voting Date	Party	Candidate	Party	Candidate	Party	Candidate	Party	Candidate
Azamgarh District
343	Atraulia	7 March 2022	NISHAD	Prashant Singh	SP	Sangram Yadav	BSP	Saroj Kumar	INC	Ramesh Dubey
344	Gopalpur	7 March 2022	BJP	Satyendra Rai	SP	Mohammad Nafeesh Ahmad	BSP	Ramesh Chand Yadav	INC	Mirza Shan Alam Beg
345	Sagri	7 March 2022	BJP	Bandana Singh	SP	Dr. H.N Patel	BSP	Shankar Yadav	INC	Rana Khatoon
346	Mubarakpur	7 March 2022	BJP	Arvind Jaiswal	SP	Akhilesh Yadav	BSP	Abdus Salam	INC	Parvin Mande
347	Azamgarh	7 March 2022	BJP	Akhilesh Mishra	SP	Durga Prasad Yadav	BSP	Sushil Kumar Singh	INC	Praveen Kumar Singh
348	Nizamabad	7 March 2022	BJP	Manoj Yadav	SP	Mohammad Alambadi	BSP	Piyush Kumar Singh	INC	Anil Kumar Yadav
349	Phoolpur Pawai	7 March 2022	BJP	Ramsurat Rajbhar	SP	Ramakant Yadav	BSP	Shakeel Ahmed	INC	Mohd Shahid Shadaab
350	Didarganj	7 March 2022	BJP	Dr. Krishna Murari Vishwakarma	SP	Kamlakant Rajbhar	BSP	Bhupendra	INC	Awadhesh Kumar Singh
351	Lalganj (SC)	7 March 2022	BJP	Neelam Sonkar	SP	Bechai Saroj	BSP	Azad Ari Mardan	INC	Pushpa Bharti
352	Mehnagar (SC)	7 March 2022	BJP	Manju Saroj	SP	Puja Saroj	BSP	Pankaj Kumar	INC	Nirmala Bharti
Mau District
353	Madhuban	7 March 2022	BJP	Ramvilash Chauhan	SP	Umesh Pandey	BSP	Neelam Kushwaha	INC	Amresh Chandra Pandey
354	Ghosi	7 March 2022	BJP	Vijay Rajbhar	SP	Dara Singh Chauhan	BSP	Vasim Ekbal	INC	Priyanka Yadav
355	Muhammadabad-Gohna (SC)	7 March 2022	BJP	Poonam Saroj	SP	Rajendra	BSP	Dharm Singh Gautam	INC	Banwari Lal
356	Mau	7 March 2022	BJP	Ashok Singh	SBSP	Abbas Ansari	BSP	Bhim Rajbhar	INC	Madhawendra Singh
Ballia District
357	Belthara Road (SC)	3 March 2022	BJP	Chhattu Ram	SBSP	Hansu Ram	BSP	Praveen Prakash	INC	Gita Goyal
358	Rasara	3 March 2022	BJP	Babban Rajbhar	SBSP	Mahendra Chauhan	BSP	Umashankar Singh	INC	Dr Omlata
359	Sikanderpur	3 March 2022	BJP	Sanjay Yadav	SP	Jiyauddin Rizvi	BSP	Sanjeev Kumar Verma	INC	Brijesh Singh Gath
360	Phephana	3 March 2022	BJP	Upendra Tiwari	SP	Sangram Singh Yadav	BSP	Kamal Dev	INC	Jainendra Kumar Pandey
361	Ballia Nagar	3 March 2022	BJP	Daya Shankar Singh	SP	Narad Rai	BSP	Shivdas Prasad Verma	INC	Om Praksh Tiwari
362	Bansdih	3 March 2022	NISHAD	Ketaki Singh	SP	Ram Govind Chaudhary	BSP	Manti	INC	Punit Pathak
363	Bairia	3 March 2022	BJP	Anand Swaroop Shukla	SP	Jai Prakash Anchal	BSP	Subhash Yadav	INC	Sonam Bind
Jaunpur District
364	Badlapur	7 March 2022	BJP	Ramesh Chandra Mishra	SP	Om Prakash Dubey	BSP	Dr. Manoj Singh Somvanshi	INC	Arti Singh
365	Shahganj	7 March 2022	NISHAD	Ramesh Singh	SP	Shailendra Yadav 'Lalai'	BSP	Indar Dev	INC	Parvez Alam Bhutto
366	Jaunpur	7 March 2022	BJP	Girish Chandra Yadav	SP	Arshad Khan	BSP	Saleem Khan	INC	Nadeem Javed
367	Malhani	7 March 2022	BJP	K.P Singh	SP	Lucky Yadav	BSP	Shailendra Yadav	INC	Pushpa Shukla
368	Mungra Badshahpur	7 March 2022	BJP	Ajay Dubey	SP	Pankaj Patel	BSP	Dinesh Kumar Shukla	INC	Dr Pramod Singh
369	Machhlishahr (SC)	7 March 2022	BJP	Mihilal Gautam	SP	Dr. Ragini Sonkar	BSP	Vijay Kumar	INC	Mala Devi Sonkar
370	Mariyahu	7 March 2022	AD(S)	R.K Patel	SP	Sushma Patel	BSP	Anand Dubey	INC	Mira Ramachandra Pandey
371	Zafrabad	7 March 2022	BJP	Dr. Harendra Prasad Singh	SBSP	Jagdish Narayan Rai	BSP	Santosh Kumar Mishra	INC	Laxmi Nagar
372	Kerakat (SC)	7 March 2022	BJP	Dinesh Chaudhary	SP	Tufani Saroj	BSP	Lal Bahadur	INC	Rajesh Gautam
Ghazipur District
373	Jakhanian (SC)	7 March 2022	BJP	Ramraj Vanvasi	SBSP	Bedi Ram	BSP	Vijay Kumar	INC	Sunil Ram
374	Saidpur (SC)	7 March 2022	NISHAD	Subhash Pasi	SP	Ankit Bharti	BSP	Binod Kumar	INC	Seema Devi
375	Ghazipur Sadar	7 March 2022	BJP	Sangeeta Balwant	SP	Jai Kishan Sahu	BSP	Raj Kumar Singh Gautam	INC	Lautan Ram Nishad
376	Jangipur	7 March 2022	BJP	Ramnaresh Kushwaha	SP	Virendra Kumar Yadav	BSP	Mukesh	INC	Ajay Rajbhar
377	Zahoorabad	7 March 2022	BJP	Kalicharan Rajbhar	SBSP	Om Prakash Rajbhar	BSP	Saiyyada Shadab Fatima	INC	Gyan Prakash Munna
378	Mohammadabad	7 March 2022	BJP	Alka Rai	SP	Suhaib Ansari	BSP	Madhvendra Rai	INC	Dr Arvind Kishore Rai
379	Zamania	7 March 2022	BJP	Sunita Parikshit Singh	SP	Om Prakash Singh	BSP	Mohammad Yusuf Ali Khan	INC	Farzana Khatoon
Chandauli District
380	Mughalsarai	7 March 2022	BJP	Ramesh Jaiswal	SP	Chandra Shekhar Yadav	BSP	Irshad Ahmad	INC	Chabbu Patel
381	Sakaldiha	7 March 2022	BJP	Suryamuni Tiwari	SP	Prabhunarayan Yadav	BSP	Jaysham	INC	Devendra Pratap Singh
382	Saiyadraja	7 March 2022	BJP	Sushil Singh	SP	Manoj Singh	BSP	Amit Kumar Yadav	INC	Vimla Devi Bind
383	Chakia (SC)	7 March 2022	BJP	Kailash Kharvar	SP	Jitendra Kumar	BSP	Vikas Azad	INC	Sumer Ram
Varanasi District
384	Pindra	7 March 2022	BJP	Avadhesh Singh	AD(K)	Rajesh Kumar Singh	BSP	Babulal Patel	INC	Ajai Rai
385	Ajagara (SC)	7 March 2022	BJP	Tribhuvan Ram	SBSP	Sunil Sonkar	BSP	Raghunath Chaudhari	INC	Asha Devi
386	Shivpur	7 March 2022	BJP	Anil Rajbhar	SBSP	Arvind Rajbhar	BSP	Ravi Maurya	INC	Girish Pandey
387	Rohaniya	7 March 2022	AD(S)	Sunil Patel	AD(K)	Abhay Patel	BSP	Arun Singh Patel	INC	Rajeshwar Patel
388	Varanasi North	7 March 2022	BJP	Ravindra Jaiswal	SP	Ashfaque Ahmad	BSP	Shyam Prakash	INC	Gularana Tabassum
389	Varanasi South	7 March 2022	BJP	Neelkanth Tiwari	SP	Kameshwar Nath Dikshit	BSP	Dinesh Kasaudhan	INC	Mudita Kapoor
390	Varanasi Cantonment	7 March 2022	BJP	Saurabh Srivastava	SP	Puja Yadav	BSP	Kaushik Kumar Pandey	INC	Rajesh Mishra
391	Sevapuri	7 March 2022	BJP	Neel Ratan Singh Patel	SP	Surendra Singh Patel	BSP	Arvind Kumar Tripathi	INC	Anju Singh
Bhadohi District
392	Bhadohi	7 March 2022	BJP	Ravindra Nath Tripathi	SP	Zahid Beg	BSP	Harishankar	INC	Wasim Ansari
393	Gyanpur	7 March 2022	NISHAD	Vipul Dubey	SP	Ram Kishor Bind	BSP	Upendra Kumar Singh	INC	Suresh Mishra
394	Aurai (ST)	7 March 2022	BJP	Dinanath Bhaskar	SP	Anjana Saroj	BSP	Kamal Shankar	INC	Sanju Kannojia
Mirzapur District
395	Chhanbey (ST)	7 March 2022	AD(S)	Rahul Prakash Kol	SP	Kirti Kol	BSP	Dhaneshwar	INC	Bhagwati Prasad Chaudhary
396	Mirzapur	7 March 2022	BJP	Ratnakar Mishra	SP	Kailash Nath Chaurasiya	BSP	Rajesh Kumar Pandey	INC	Bhagwan Dutt (Rajan Pathak)
397	Majhawan	7 March 2022	NISHAD	Vinod Kumar Bind	SP	Rohit Shukla	BSP	Pushpalata Bind	INC	Shankar Chaubey
398	Chunar	7 March 2022	BJP	Anurag Singh	AD(K)	Ramashankar Singh Patel	BSP	Vijay Kumar	INC	Seema Devi
399	Marihan	7 March 2022	BJP	Rama Shankar Singh	SP	Ravindra Bahadur Singh Patel	BSP	Narendra Singh Kushwaha	INC	Geeta Devi
Sonbhadra District
400	Ghorawal	7 March 2022	BJP	Anil Kumar Maurya	SP	Ramesh Chandra Dubey	BSP	Mohan Singh Kushwaha	INC	Videshwari Singh Rathore
401	Robertsganj	7 March 2022	BJP	Bhupesh Chaubey	SP	Avinash Kushwaha	BSP	Avinash Shukla	INC	Kamlesh Ojha
402	Obra (ST)	7 March 2022	BJP	Sanjeev Gond	SP	Arvind Kumar	BSP	Subhash Kharwar	INC	Ramraj Gond
403	Duddhi (ST)	7 March 2022	BJP	Ramdular Gaur	SP	Vijay Singh Gond	BSP	Hariram Chero	INC	Basanti Panika
