= Uttar Pradesh Congress Committee =

- President: Aradhana Misra
- Chairperson: Virendra Chaudhary
- Headquarters: 10, Nehru Bhawan, Mall Avenue Road, Hazratganj, Lucknow, Uttar Pradesh
- Youth wing: Uttar Pradesh Youth Congress
- Women's wing: Uttar Pradesh Mahila Congress Committee
- Ideology: Left-wing populism; Social liberalism; Democratic socialism; Secularism; Social Democracy
- ECI status: A State Unit of Indian National Congress
- Alliance: Indian National Developmental Inclusive Alliance
- Seats in Rajya Sabha: 0 / 31
- Seats in Lok Sabha: 6 / 80
- Seats in Uttar Pradesh Legislative Council: 0 / 100
- Seats in Uttar Pradesh Legislative Assembly: 2 / 403

Election symbol

Website
- https://upcongress.in/

Uttar Pradesh Congress Committee (Uttar Pradesh CC) is the Pradesh Congress Committee (state wing) of the Indian National Congress (INC) serving in the state of Uttar Pradesh. It is responsible for organizing and coordinating the party's activities and campaigns within the state, as well as selecting candidates for local, state, and national elections.

The committee has a long history of political influence in the state, having played a significant role in the state's politics during the pre-independence era and after. From 1928 to 1975 the Party saw the prominent role and contribution of leaders like GB Pant, Rafi Ahmad Kidwai, CB Gupta, Nirmal Chandra Chaturvedi, Sampurnanand and many others. However, it has faced challenges in recent years, including a decline in electoral support and internal conflicts. Congress Working Committee Appointed Priyanka Gandhi as General Secretary of UP (East), later she has taken charge of General Secretary (AICC). CLP Leader of the Uttar Pradesh Congress Committee is Aradhana Misra 3rd Term MLA from Rampur Khas, Pratapgarh.

== Structure and Composition ==
S.No.	Name	Designation	District Allotted
1	Ajay Rai, Former Minister,M.L.A. 5 Terms (1996-2017) Government Of Uttar Pradesh	President, Uttar Pradesh Congress Committee	
2	Nasimuddin Siddiqui, Ex Cabinet Minister	Provincial President, Western Zone	Saharanpur, Muzaffarnagar, Shamli, Baghpat, Bulandshahr, Ghaziabad, Meerut, Gautambudh Nagar, Bijnor, Hapur, Amroha, Moradabad, Rampur and Sambhal
3	Ajay Rai, Ex MLA	Provincial President, Prayagraj Zone	Varanasi, Ghazipur, Chandauli, Jaunpur, Bhadohi, Mirzapur, Sonbhadra, Kaushambi, Allahabad, Pratapgarh, Amethi and Sultanpur
4	Nakul Dubey, Ex MLA	Provincial President, Awadh Zone	Lucknow, Unnao, Bahraich, Barabanki, Balrampur, Shravasti, Ghonda, Sitapur, Lakhimpur-Khiri, Hardoi and Rae Barely
5	Virendra Chaudhary, MLA	Provincial President, Purvanchal Zone	Siddharth Nagar, Maharajganj, Gorakhpur, Basti, Kushinagar, Azamgarh, Mau, Deoria, Ballia, Sant Kabir Nagar, Faizabad and Ambedkar Nagar
6	Yogesh Dikshit	Provincial President, Brij Zone	Mathura, Agra, Firozabad, Etah, Mainpuri, Kasganj, Aligarh, Hathras, Badaun, Bareilly, Shahjahanpur, Pilibhit and Farrukhabad
7	Anil Yadav	Provincial President, Bundelkhand and Kanpur Zone	Kanpur, Kanpur Dehat, Kannauj, Auraiya, Jalaun, Mahoba, Jhansi, Lalitpur, Banda, Chitrakoot, Fatehpur, Hamirpur and Etawah
8	Dr Jiya Ram Verma	Medical Cell President, Uttar Pradesh Congress Committee	
9	Priyanka Gupta	Spokesperson	Spokespersons of Indian National Congress

== List of presidents ==
S.No.	President	Portrait	Term		Tenure	Ref.
1.	N. D. Tiwari		1990	1994	4 years	
2.	Jitendra Prasad		1994	1998	3 years	
3.	Salman Khurshid		1998	4 December 2000	2 years	
4.	Sriprakash Jaiswal		4 December 2000	3 July 2002	1 year, 211 days	
5.	Arun Kumar Singh Munna		3 July 2002	30 May 2003	331 days	
6.	Jagdambika Pal		30 May 2003	7 November 2004	1 year, 161 days	
(3).	Salman Khurshid		7 November 2004	12 September 2007	2 years, 309 days	
7.	Rita Bahuguna Joshi		12 September 2007	29 August 2012	4 years, 352 days	
8.	Nirmal Khatri		29 August 2012	12 July 2016	3 years, 318 days	
9.	Raj Babbar		12 July 2016	7 October 2019	3 years, 87 days	
10.	Ajay Kumar Lallu		7 October 2019	16 March 2022	2 years, 160 days	
11.	Brijlal Khabri		1 October 2022	17 August 2023	320 days	
12.	Ajay Rai		17 August 2023	2 October 2026	3 years, 46 days	
13.	Aradhana Misra		2 October 2026	Incumbent	43 days	

== Advisory Council to General Secretary ==
S.No.	Name	Design
1.	Ajay Rai	Member
2.	Anugrah Narayan Singh	Member
3.	Mohsina Kidwai	Member
4.	Nasimuddin Siddiqui	Member
5.	Nirmal Khatri	Member
6.	Pradeep Mathur	Member
7.	Pramod Tiwari	Member
8.	Praveen Singh Aron	Member
9.	P. L. Punia	Member
10.	Rajesh Mishra	Member
11.	Raashid Alvi	Member
12.	Salman Khurshid	Member
13.	Sanjay Kapoor	Member
14.	Vivek Bansal	Member
15.	Zafar Ali Naqvi	Member
16.	Akash Singh Chandel	Member

== Group on Strategy and Planning ==
S.No.	Name	Design
1.	Brijlal Khabri	Member
2.	Prashant Shukla	Member
3.	Rajiv Shukla	Member
4.	Pradeep Jain Aditya	Member

== MPs and MLAs from Uttar Pradesh ==
S.No.	Name	Constituency
Member of Parliament
1	Rahul Gandhi	Raebareli
2	Imran Masood	Saharanpur
3	Rakesh Rathore	Sitapur
4	Tanuj Punia	Barabanki
5	Kishori Lal Sharma	Amethi
6	Ujjwal Raman Singh	Allahabad
Member of Legislative Assembly
1	Aradhana Mishra	Rampur Khas
2	Virendra Chaudhary	Pharenda

== Electoral performance ==
=== Uttar Pradesh Legislative Assembly ===
Election	Seats up for election	Seats contested	Seats won	Change	Votes polled	Vote share	Swing	Resulting Government
1937	228	—N/a	133 / 228	—N/a	—N/a	—N/a	—N/a	Majority Government
1946	228	—N/a	153 / 228	▲20	—N/a	—N/a	—N/a	Supermajority Government
1952	430	429	388 / 430	▲235	8,032,475	47.93 / 100	—N/a	Supermajority Government
1957	430	430	286 / 430	▼102	9,298,382	42.42 / 100	▼5.51%	Majority Government
1962	430	429	249 / 430	▼37	6,471,669	36.33 / 100	▼6.09%	Majority Government
1967	425	425	199 / 425	▼50	6,912,104	32.20 / 100	▼4.13%	Minority Government (till April 1967); Opposition (till 1968)
1969	425	424	211 / 425	▲12	7,893,152	33.69 / 100	▲1.49%	Minority Government (1969-1970; 1971-1973; 1973-1974); Opposition (1970; 1970-1971)
1974	424	403	215 / 424	▲4	8,868,229	32.29 / 100	▼1.40%	Majority Government
1977	425	395	47 / 425	▼168	7,592,107	31.94 / 100	▼0.35%	Opposition
1980	425	424	309 / 425	▲262	9,720,767	37.65 / 100	▲5.71%	Supermajority Government
1985	425	425	269 / 425	▼40	11,544,698	39.25 / 100	▲1.60%	Majority Government
1989	425	410	94 / 425	▼175	10,866,428	27.90 / 100	▼11.35%	Opposition
1991	419	413	46 / 419	▼48	6,480,753	17.32 / 100	▼10.58%	Opposition
1993	422	421	28 / 422	▼20	7,533,272	15.08 / 100	▼2.24%	Opposition
1996	424	126	33 / 424	▲11	4,626,663	8.35 / 100	▼6.73%	Opposition
2002	403	402	25 / 403	▼8	4,810,231	8.96 / 100	▲0.61%	Opposition
2007	403	393	22 / 403	▼3	4,489,234	8.61 / 100	▼0.35%	Opposition
2012	403	355	28 / 403	▲6	8,832,895	11.65 / 100	▲3.04%	Opposition
2017	403	114	7 / 403	▼21	5,416,540	6.25 / 100	▼5.40%	Opposition
2022	403	403	2 / 403	▼5	2,416,540	3.25 / 100	▼2.40%	Opposition

Uttar Pradesh Congress Legislative Assembly seat count

=== Indian General Election in Uttar Pradesh ===
Election	Seats up for election	Seats contested	Seats won	Change	Votes polled	Vote share	Swing	Resulting Government (in Centre)	National Leader
1951-1952	86	86	81 / 86	—N/a	9,047,392	52.99 / 100	—N/a	Supermajority Government	Jawaharlal Nehru
1957	86	86	70 / 86	▼11	10,599,639	46.29 / 100	▼6.70%	Supermajority Government	Jawaharlal Nehru
1962	86	86	62 / 86	▼8	6,842,472	38.20 / 100	▼8.09%	Supermajority Government	Jawaharlal Nehru
1967	85	85	47 / 85	▼15	7,285,130	33.44 / 100	▼4.76%	Majority Government	Indira Gandhi
1971	85	78	73 / 85	▲26	9,981,309	48.58 / 100	▲15.14%	Supermajority Government	Indira Gandhi
1977	85	85	0 / 85	▼73	7,170,182	24.99 / 100	▼23.59%	Opposition	Indira Gandhi (defeated)
1980	85	85	51 / 85	▲51	10,171,194	35.90 / 100	▲10.91%	Supermajority Government	Indira Gandhi
1984	85	85	83 / 85	▲32	17,391,831	51.03 / 100	▲15.13%	Supermajority Government	Rajiv Gandhi
1989	85	84	15 / 85	▼68	12,393,934	31.77 / 100	▼19.26%	Opposition (till 1990); External Support for SJP(R) Govt (till 1991)	Rajiv Gandhi
1991	85	80	5 / 85	▼10	6,755,015	18.02 / 100	▼13.75%	Minority Government	P. V. Narasimha Rao
1996	85	85	5 / 85	Steady	3,746,505	8.14 / 100	▼9.88%	Opposition (till Jun 1996); External Support for UF Govt (till 1998)	P. V. Narasimha Rao
1998	85	76	0 / 85	▼5	3,361,053	6.02 / 100	▼2.13%	Opposition	Sitaram Kesri (defeated)
1999	85	76	10 / 85	▲10	8,001,685	14.72 / 100	▲8.70%	Opposition	Sonia Gandhi
2004	80	73	9 / 80	▼1	6,412,293	12.04 / 100	▼2.68%	Minority Government	Sonia Gandhi
2009	80	80	21 / 80	▲12	10,113,521	18.25 / 100	▲6.21%	Minority Government	Sonia Gandhi
2014	80	80	2 / 80	▼19	6,061,267	7.53 / 100	▼10.72%	Opposition	Sonia Gandhi
2019	80	80	1 / 80	▼1	5,457,352	6.36 / 100	▼1.17%	Opposition	Rahul Gandhi
2024	80	17	6 / 80	▲5	8,294,318	9.46 / 100	▲3.10%	Opposition	Mallikarjun Kharge

Uttar Pradesh Congress Lok Sabha seat count

== List of chief ministers ==
Premier of United Provinces (1937–50)
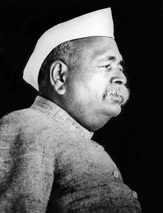
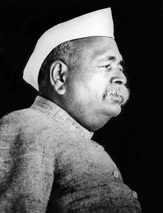
No.	Portrait	Name	Constituency	Term of office			Assembly
No.	Portrait	Name	Constituency	Start	End	Tenure	Assembly
1		Govind Ballabh Pant	NA	17 July 1937	2 November 1939	2 years, 108 days	1st (1937 Elections)
(1)		Govind Ballabh Pant	NA	1 April 1946	25 January 1950	3 years, 299 days	2nd (1946 Elections)

Chief Ministers of Uttar Pradesh
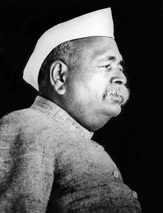
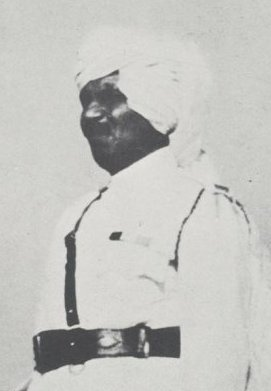
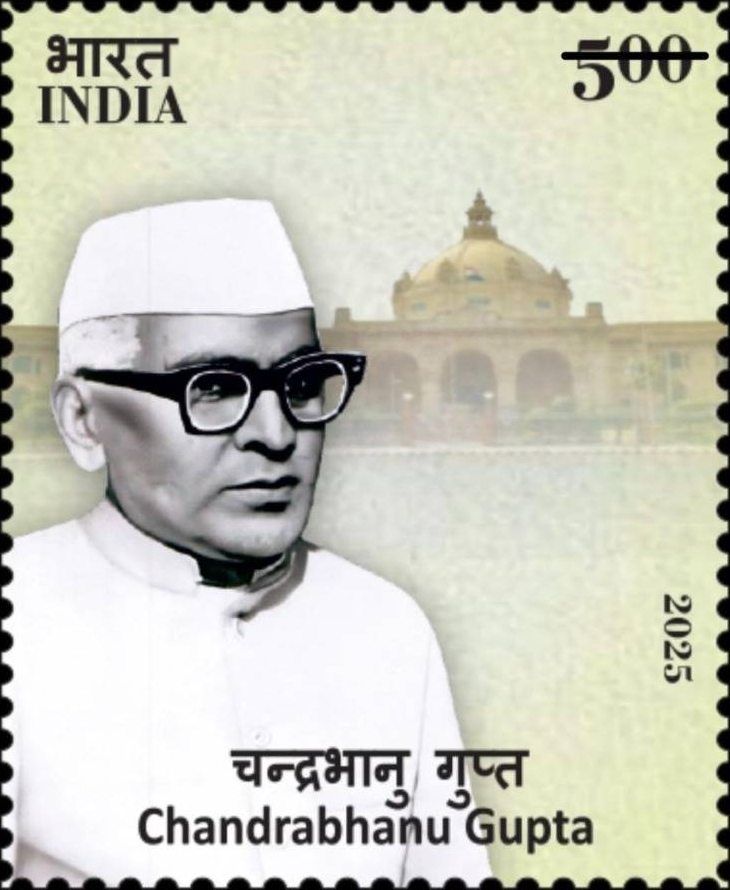
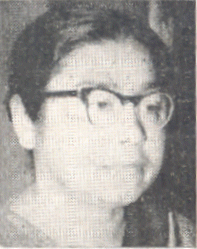
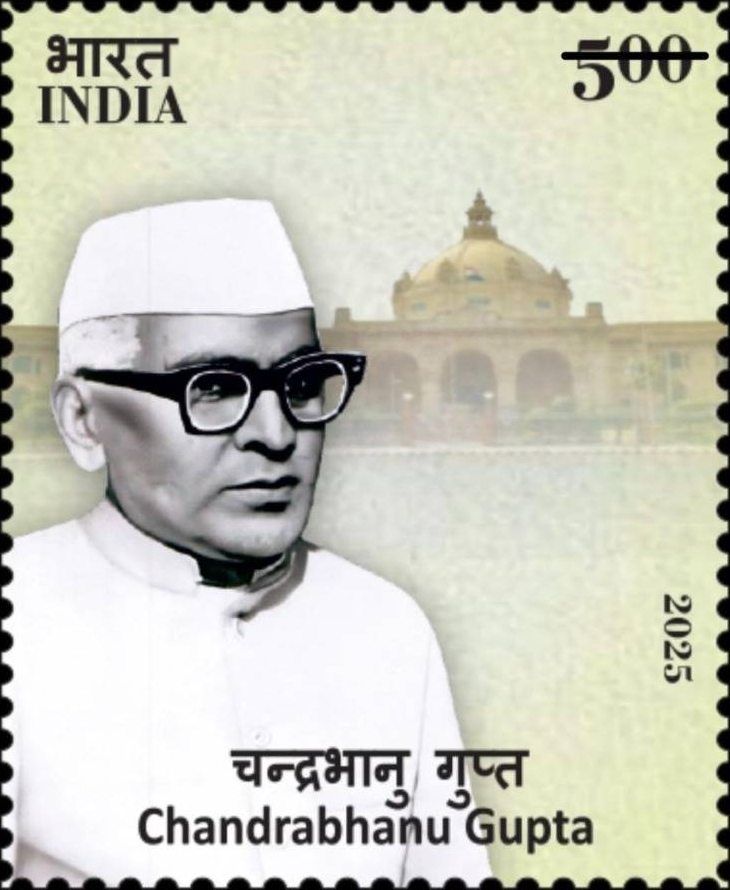
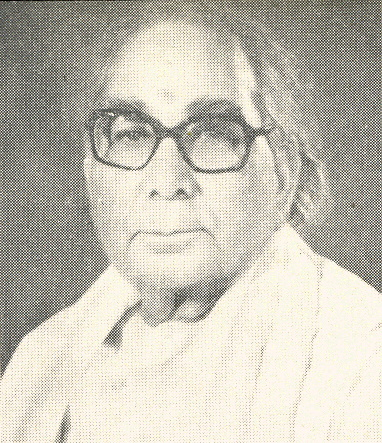
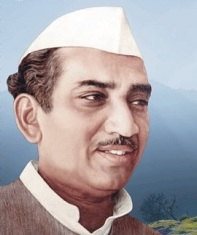
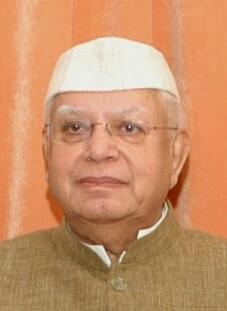
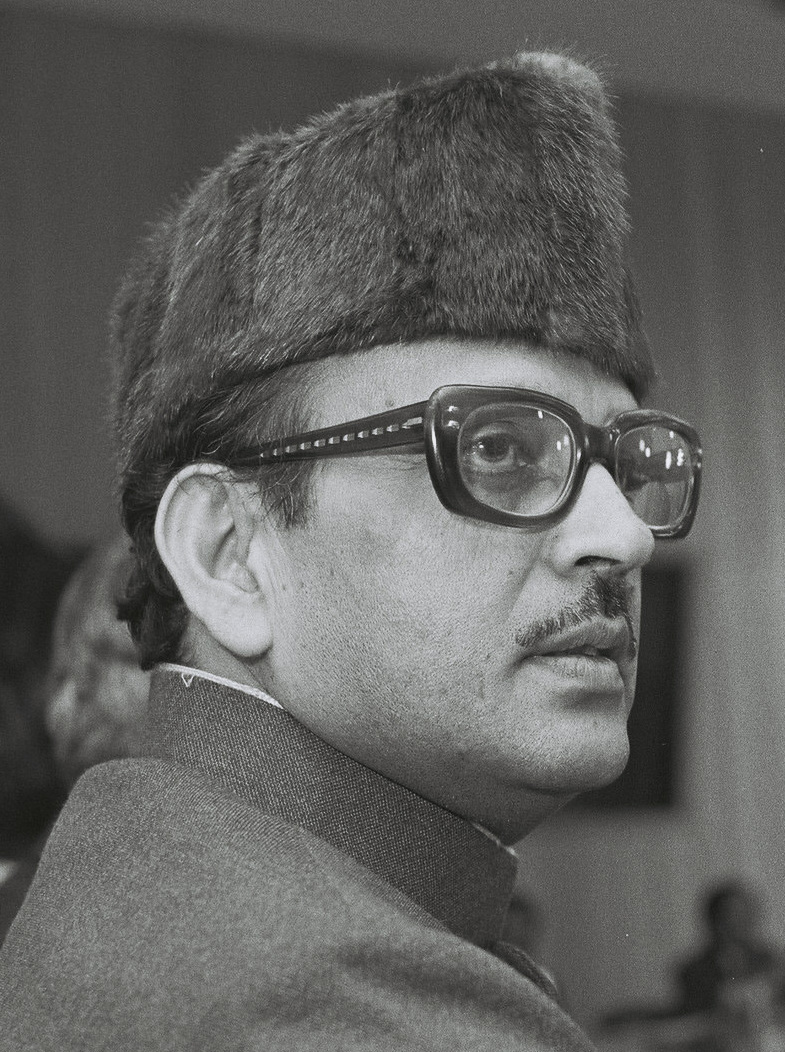
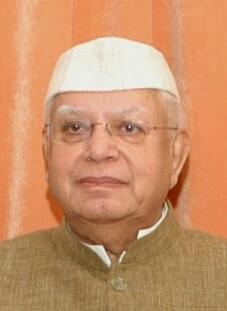
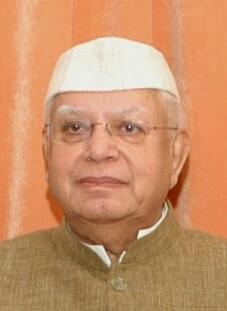
No.	Portrait	Name	Constituency	Term of office			Assembly
No.	Portrait	Name	Constituency	Start	End	Tenure	Assembly
1		Govind Ballabh Pant	Bareilly Municipality	26 January 1950	20 May 1952	4 years, 335 days	Provincial (1946 Elections); 1st (1951 election)
1		Govind Ballabh Pant	Bareilly Municipality	20 May 1952	27 December 1954	4 years, 335 days	Provincial (1946 Elections); 1st (1951 election)
2		Sampurnanand	Varanasi South	28 December 1954	9 April 1957	5 years, 344 days	2nd (1957 election)
2		Sampurnanand	Varanasi South	10 April 1957	6 December 1960	5 years, 344 days	2nd (1957 election)
3		Chandra Bhanu Gupta	Ranikhet South	7 December 1960	14 March 1962	2 years, 298 days	3rd (1962 election)
3		Chandra Bhanu Gupta	Ranikhet South	14 March 1962	1 October 1963	2 years, 298 days	3rd (1962 election)
4		Sucheta Kripalani	Menhdawal	2 October 1963	13 March 1967	3 years, 162 days	3rd (1962 election)
(3)		Chandra Bhanu Gupta	Ranikhet	14 March 1967	2 April 1967	19 days	4th (1967 election)
(3)		Chandra Bhanu Gupta	Ranikhet	26 February 1969	17 February 1970	356 days	4th (1967 election)
6		Kamalapati Tripathi	Chandauli	4 April 1971	12 June 1973	2 years, 69 days	5th (1969 election)
7		Hemwati Nandan Bahuguna	Bara	8 November 1973	4 March 1974	2 years, 21 days	6th (1974 election)
7		Hemwati Nandan Bahuguna	Bara	5 March 1974	29 November 1975	2 years, 21 days	6th (1974 election)
8		N. D. Tiwari	Kashipur	21 January 1976	30 April 1977	1 year, 99 days	6th (1974 election)
9		Vishwanath Pratap Singh	Tindwari	9 June 1980	18 July 1982	2 years, 39 days	8th (1980 election)
10		Sripati Mishra	Isauli	19 July 1982	2 August 1984	2 years, 14 days	8th (1980 election)
(8)		N. D. Tiwari	Kashipur	3 August 1984	10 March 1985	1 year, 52 days	9th (1985 election)
(8)		N. D. Tiwari	Kashipur	11 March 1985	24 September 1985	1 year, 52 days	9th (1985 election)
12		Vir Bahadur Singh	Paniyara	24 September 1985	24 June 1988	2 years, 274 days	9th (1985 election)
(8)		N. D. Tiwari	Kashipur	25 June 1988	5 December 1989	1 year, 163 days	9th (1985 election)

== District & City Congress Committee ==
Sr. NO.	Division	District/City	President
1.	Saharanpur	Saharanpur DCC	Sandeep Rana
1.	Saharanpur	Saharanpur CCC	Manish Tyagi
1.	Saharanpur	Shamli DCC	Akhlaq Pradhan
1.	Saharanpur	Shamli CCC	Munish Devi
1.	Saharanpur	Muzaffarnagar DCC	Satpal Kataria
1.	Saharanpur	Muzaffarnagar CCC	Ranjan Mittal
2.	Moradabad	Moradabad DCC	Vinod Gumber
2.	Moradabad	Moradabad CCC	Junaid Quraishi
2.	Moradabad	Bijnor DCC	Hainrita
2.	Moradabad	Bijnor CCC	Humayun Baig
2.	Moradabad	Rampur DCC	Pramila Kumar Sharma
2.	Moradabad	Rampur CCC	Waqar Ali Khan
2.	Moradabad	Amroha DCC	Omkar Kataria
2.	Moradabad	Amroha CCC	Indresh Sharma
2.	Moradabad	Sambhal DCC	Hazi Mohd. Arif Turki
2.	Moradabad	Sambhal CCC	Shiv Kishor Gautam
3.	Bareilly	Bareilly DCC	Mirza Ashfaq Saqlaini
3.	Bareilly	Bareilly CCC	Dinesh Gupta
3.	Bareilly	Badaun DCC	Ajeet Yadav
3.	Bareilly	Badaun CCC	Munna Lal Sagar
3.	Bareilly	Pilibhit DCC	Harpreet Singh Chhaba
3.	Bareilly	Pilibhit CCC	Srikrishan Gangwar
3.	Bareilly	Shahjahanpur DCC	Rajneesh Gupta
3.	Bareilly	Shahjahanpur CCC	Taqweem Hasan Khan
4.	Meerut	Meerut DCC	Gaurav Bhati
4.	Meerut	Meerut CCC	Ranjan Sharma
4.	Meerut	Baghpat DCC	Luv Kashyap
4.	Meerut	Baghpat CCC	Ram Hari Panwar
4.	Meerut	Bulandshahr DCC	Ziaur Rahman
4.	Meerut	Bulandshahr CCC	Er. Ravi Lodhi
4.	Meerut	Gautam Budh Nagar DCC	Deepak Bhati
4.	Meerut	Noida CCC	Mukesh Yadav
4.	Meerut	Ghaziabad DCC	Satish Sharma
4.	Meerut	Ghaziabad CCC	Veer Singh Jatav
4.	Meerut	Hapur DCC	Rakesh Tyagi
4.	Meerut	Hapur CCC	Irfan Ahmad
5.	Aligarh	Aligarh DCC	Thakur Somveer Singh
5.	Aligarh	Aligarh CCC	Naved Khan
5.	Aligarh	Etah DCC	Hazi Ashik Husain
5.	Aligarh	Etah CCC	Vineet Parashar Valmiki
5.	Aligarh	Hathras DCC	Vivek Kumar Upadhyay
5.	Aligarh	Hathras CCC	Yogesh Kumar
5.	Aligarh	Kasganj DCC	Manoj Pandey
5.	Aligarh	Kasganj CCC	Rajendra Kashyap
6.	Agra	Agra DCC	GAURAV YADAV
6.	Agra	Agra CCC	Amit Diwakar
6.	Agra	Firozabad DCC	Ram Niwas Yadav
6.	Agra	Firozabad CCC	Shafaqat Khan Raju
6.	Agra	Mainpuri DCC	Gopal Kulshresth
6.	Agra	Mainpuri CCC	Dr. Nagendra Singh Yadav
6.	Agra	Mathura DCC	Mukesh Dhangar
6.	Agra	Mathura CCC	Pt. Yateendra Mukkadam
7.	Devipatan	Gonda DCC	Ram Pratap Singh
7.	Devipatan	Gonda CCC	Shahid Ali Qureshi
7.	Devipatan	Bahraich DCC	Shivendra Pratap Singh
7.	Devipatan	Bahraich CCC	Mirza Tariq Beg
7.	Devipatan	Shrawasti DCC	Vidya Mani Tripathi
7.	Devipatan	Balrampur DCC	Shiv Lal Kori
8.	Basti	Basti DCC	Vishwanath Chaudhary
8.	Basti	Siddharthnagar DCC	Qazi Suhail Ahmad
8.	Basti	Sant Kabir Nagar DCC	Praveen Chandra Pandey
9.	Gorakhpur	Gorakhpur DCC	Rajesh Kumar Tiwari
9.	Gorakhpur	Gorakhpur CCC	Ravi Pratap Nishad
9.	Gorakhpur	Deoria DCC	Vijayshekhar Mall
9.	Gorakhpur	Deoria CCC	Mirza Khurshid Ahmad
9.	Gorakhpur	Kushinagar DCC	Ravindra Radhey Vishwakarma
9.	Gorakhpur	Maharajganj DCC	Vijay Singh
10.	Kanpur	Auraiya DCC	Sarita Dohre
10.	Kanpur	Etawah DCC	Ashutosh Dikshit
10.	Kanpur	Etawah CCC	Rashid Khan
10.	Kanpur	Farrukhabad DCC	Shakuntala Devi
10.	Kanpur	Farrukhabad CCC	Ankur Mishra
10.	Kanpur	Kanpur Dehat DCC	Ambrish Singh Gaur
10.	Kanpur	Kanpur Nagar Gramin DCC	Sandeep Shukla
10.	Kanpur	Kanpur Mahanagar CCC	Pawan Gupta
10.	Kanpur	Kannauj DCC	Mohd. Shakir Husain Ali
10.	Kanpur	Kannauj CCC	Pankaj Verma
11.	Lucknow	Lucknow DCC	Rudra Daman Singh
11.	Lucknow	Lucknow CCC	Dr. Shehzad; Amit Tyagi
11.	Lucknow	Hardoi DCC	Vikram Pandey
11.	Lucknow	Hardoi CCC	Anupam Dixit
11.	Lucknow	Lakhimpur Kheri DCC	Prahlad Patel
11.	Lucknow	Lakhimpur Kheri CCC	Riyaz Ahmad Khan
11.	Lucknow	Raebareli DCC	Pankaj Tiwari
11.	Lucknow	Raebareli CCC	Dhiraj Shrivastava
11.	Lucknow	Sitapur DCC	Dr. Mamta Verma
11.	Lucknow	Sitapur CCC	Shishir Bajpai
11.	Lucknow	Unnao DCC	Surendra Kushwaha
11.	Lucknow	Unnao CCC	Faiz Farooqi
12.	Ayodhya	Ambedkar Nagar DCC	K. K. Yadav
12.	Ayodhya	Amethi DCC	Pradeep Singhal
12.	Ayodhya	Barabanki DCC	Mohd. Mohsin
12.	Ayodhya	Barabanki CCC	Rajendra Prasad Verma
12.	Ayodhya	Ayodhya DCC	Chet Narayan Singh
12.	Ayodhya	Ayodhya CCC	Sunil Krishna Gautam
12.	Ayodhya	Sultanpur DCC	Abhishek Singh Rana
12.	Ayodhya	Sultanpur CCC	Shakeel Ansari
13.	Azamgarh	Azamgarh DCC	Kaushal Kumar
13.	Azamgarh	Azamgarh CCC	Riyazul Hassan
13.	Azamgarh	Ballia DCC	Umashankar Pathak
13.	Azamgarh	Mau DCC	Rajmangal Yadav
13.	Azamgarh	Mau CCC	Salman Jamshed
14.	Jhansi	Jhansi DCC	Deshraj Richhariya
14.	Jhansi	Jhansi CCC	Manoj Gupta
14.	Jhansi	Jalaun DCC	Arvind Senger
14.	Jhansi	Lalitpur DCC	Dr. Daya Ram Rajak
15.	Chitrakoot	Banda DCC	Rajesh Dixit
15.	Chitrakoot	Banda CCC	Afsana Shah
15.	Chitrakoot	Chitrakoot DCC	Kushal Patel
15.	Chitrakoot	Hamirpur DCC	Govind Ahirwar
15.	Chitrakoot	Mahoba DCC	Santosh Dhuriya
16.	Prayagraj	Allahabad DCC (Ganga Par)	Ashfaq Ahmad
16.	Prayagraj	Allahabad DCC (Yamuna Par)	Ashok Patel
16.	Prayagraj	Allahabad CCC	Fujal Hashmi
16.	Prayagraj	Fatehpur DCC	Mahesh Dwivedi
16.	Prayagraj	Fatehpur CCC	Mohd. Arif Gudda
16.	Prayagraj	Kaushambi DCC	Gaurav Kumar Pandey
16.	Prayagraj	Pratapgarh DCC	Dr. Neeraj Tripathi
17.	Varanasi	Varanasi DCC	Rajeshwar Singh Patel
17.	Varanasi	Varanasi CCC	Raghvendra Chaubey
17.	Varanasi	Chandauli DCC	Arun Dwivedi
17.	Varanasi	Chandauli CCC	Brijesh Gupta
17.	Varanasi	Ghazipur DCC	Sunil Ram
17.	Varanasi	Ghazipur CCC	Sandeep Kumar Vishwakarma
17.	Varanasi	Jaunpur DCC	Pramod Singh
17.	Varanasi	Jaunpur CCC	Mohd. Arif
18.	Mirzapur	Mirzapur DCC	Shiv Kumar Patel
18.	Mirzapur	Mirzapur CCC	Rajan Pathak
18.	Mirzapur	Bhadohi DCC	Waseem Ansari
18.	Mirzapur	Sonbhadra DCC	Ramraj Singh Gond
18.	Mirzapur	Sonbhadra CCC	Fareed Ahmad

== See also ==
- Indian National Congress
- Congress Working Committee
- All India Congress Committee
- Pradesh Congress Committee
- Madhya Pradesh Youth Congress
