= Satish Chandra Gulabdas =

Fijian politician

Member of House of Representatives (Fiji) Cakaudrove Indian Communal Constituency
- In office 1994–1999

Personal details
- Party: National Federation Party

Satish Chandra Gulabdas is a Fiji Indian businessman and politician, who has been the Mayor of Savusavu and a member of House of Representatives in Fiji.

He was elected unopposed into the House of Representatives in the 1994 general election from the Cakaudrove Indian Communal Constituency on a National Federation Party (NFP) ticket.

He contested the Macuata East Cakaudrove Indian Communal Constituency for the National Federation Party in the 1999 and 2001 general elections but lost on each occasion by a large margin.
