= Ramsaran =

Indian politician

MLA, 16th Legislative Assembly
- In office Mar 2012 – Mar 2017
- Preceded by: R. A. Usmani
- Succeeded by: Manju Tyagi
- Constituency: Sri Nagar

Personal details
- Born: 2 April 1963 (age 63) Lakhimpur Kheri district
- Party: Samajwadi Party
- Spouse: Kanti Devi (wife)
- Children: 3 (1 son,2 daughters)
- Parent: Nanga Ram (father)
- Education: Not known
- Profession: Politician, businessperson & farmer

Ramsaran is an Indian politician and a member of the Sixteenth Legislative Assembly of Uttar Pradesh in India. He represents the Sri Nagar constituency of Uttar Pradesh and is a member of the Samajwadi Party political party. Ramsaran belongs to the scheduled caste community.

== Early life and education ==
Ramsaran was born in Lakhimpur Kheri district. He holds Bachelor of Arts degree (alma mater not known).

== Political career ==
Ramsaran has been a MLA for one term. He represented the Sri Nagar constituency and is a member of the Samajwadi Party political party.

== Posts held ==
#	From	To	Position	Comments
01	2012	2017	Member, 16th Legislative Assembly	

== See also ==
- Sixteenth Legislative Assembly of Uttar Pradesh
- Sri Nagar (Assembly constituency)
- Uttar Pradesh Legislative Assembly
