= Aradhana Misra =

Indian politician (born 1974)

President Uttar Pradesh Congress Committee
- Incumbent
- Assumed office 2 October 2026
- Preceded by: Ajay Rai

Member of Uttar Pradesh Legislative Assembly
- Incumbent
- Assumed office 16 May 2014
- Preceded by: Pramod Tiwari
- Constituency: Rampur Khas

Leader of the Indian National Congress in Uttar Pradesh Legislative Assembly
- In office 16 October 2019 – 2 October 2026
- Preceded by: Ajay Kumar Lallu
- Succeeded by: Virendra Chaudhary

Personal details
- Born: Mona Tiwari; 20 April 1974 (age 52) Prayagraj, Uttar Pradesh, India
- Party: Indian National Congress
- Spouse: Ambika Misra (m. 1999)
- Children: 2 (1 son and 1 daughter)
- Parent: Pramod Tiwari (father)
- Education: B.Com; M.BA
- Alma mater: Allahabad University
- Website: www.aradhanamisra.com

Aradhana Misra (born Mona Tiwari; 20 April 1974), also known as Mona Misra, is an Indian politician and member of 18th Legislative Assembly of Uttar Pradesh representing Rampur Khas of Pratapgarh district in Uttar Pradesh as a member of Indian National Congress. She is the daughter of senior Congress leader and Member of Rajya Sabha Pramod Tiwari.

== Education and background ==
She received a Bachelor's degree in commerce from Allahabad University in 1997 and completed Master of Business Administration. She is currently pursuing post-graduation in Human Rights from the Institute of Human Rights, Delhi. Misra hails from a political background. Her father, Pramod Tiwari is a senior leader of Indian National Congress, who has been elected nine times consecutively as MLA from Rampur Khas assembly constituency in Pratapgarh, and is the Member of Rajya Sabha (upper house).

== Political career ==
Aradhana Misra is associated with Uttar Pradesh Congress Committee and is a member since 2000. She was earlier elected as Block Pramukh (chief) from Pratapgarh district of Uttar Pradesh for consecutive three terms, winning the elections 2001–2006, 2006–2011, and 2011 to 2016. She is a member of Uttar Pradesh state Monitoring and Vigilance Committee, MNEREA under the Ministry of Rural Development, Government of India. She was an active member of the Media Campaign Committee during the 2012 Uttar Pradesh election and had devised the media strategy for Congress and Rahul Gandhi.

In the 2022 Uttar Pradesh Legislative assembly election, Aradhana Mishra defeated her nearest BJP rival by a margin of 14,741 votes from the Rampur Khas constituency in Pratapgarh district. This is her third consecutive victory as an MLA.
