= Giyannedra Prasad =

Fijian politician (1959–2020)

Member of House of Representatives (Fiji) Macuata East Cakaudrove Indian Communal Constituency
- In office 1999–2000
- Succeeded by: Ram Sharan

Personal details
- Born: 1 October 1959 Daku Labasa, Vanua Levu, Fiji
- Died: 1 June 2020 (aged 60) Auckland, New Zealand
- Party: Fiji Labour Party
- Profession: Politician

Giyannedra Prasad (1 October 1959 – 1 June 2020) was a Fiji Indian politician who won the Macuata East Cakaudrove Indian Communal Constituency, one of the 19 seats reserved for Fiji citizens of Indian origin, for the Fiji Labour Party during the 1999 elections for the House of Representatives.

After the election he was elected the Deputy Speaker of the House of Representatives.

On 19 May 2000, he was among the 43 members of the People's Coalition Government, led by Mahendra Chaudhry, taken hostage by George Speight and his band of rebel Republic of Fiji Military Forces (RFMF) soldiers from the Counter Revolutionary Warfare Unit. He was released on 13 July 2000 after 56 days of captivity.

Prasad died from cancer on 1 June 2020 in Auckland, New Zealand.
