= Brijlal Khabri =

Indian politician

President of Uttar Pradesh Congress Committee
- In office 1 October 2022 – 17 August 2023
- Preceded by: Ajay Kumar Lallu
- Succeeded by: Ajay Rai

Member of Parliament, Lok Sabha
- In office 6 October 1999 – 16 May 2004
- Preceded by: Bhanu Pratap Singh Verma
- Succeeded by: Bhanu Pratap Singh Verma
- Constituency: Jalaun

Member of Parliament, Rajya Sabha
- In office 2008–2014
- Constituency: Uttar Pradesh

Personal details
- Born: 10 May 1961 (age 65) Khabri, Uttar Pradesh, India
- Party: Indian National Congress (since 2016)
- Other political affiliations: Bahujan Samaj Party (1999-2016)
- As of October, 2022

Brijlal Khabri (born 10 May 1961) is an Indian National Congress politician from the state of Uttar Pradesh, India. He was the President of Uttar Pradesh Congress Committee. He is a former member of parliament from Jalaun constituency, which he won in 1999 as a member of Bahujan Samaj Party.

Brijlal Khabri was appointed president of Uttar Pradesh Congress Committee on 1 October 2022.

== Positions held ==
Year	Description
1999 - 2004	Elected to 13th Lok Sabha: Member, Committee on Food, Civil Supplies and Public Distribution (1999-2000); Member, Consultative Committee for the Ministry of Labour (2000-2004)
2008 - 2014	Elected to Rajya Sabha: Member, Committee on Chemicals and Fertilizers (2009 - 2014); Member, Parliamentary Forum on Youth (2010 - 2014); Member, Consultative Committee for the Ministry of External Affairs (2010 - 2014)

== Electoral Performances ==
Year	Election	Party	Constituency Name	Result	Votes gained	Vote share%	Margin	Ref
1999	13th Lok Sabha	Bahujan Samaj Party	Jalaun	Won	1,97,705	34.39%	13,352	
2004	14th Lok Sabha	Bahujan Samaj Party	Jalaun	Lost	1,57,559	27.17%	37,669	
2014	16th Lok Sabha	Bahujan Samaj Party	Jalaun	Lost	2,61,429	23.57%	2,87,202	
2017	17th Uttar Pradesh Assembly	Indian National Congress	Mehroni	Lost	43,171	14.03%	1,16,120	
2019	17th Lok Sabha	Indian National Congress	Jalaun	Lost	89,606	7.93%	4,92,157	
2022	18th Uttar Pradesh Assembly	Indian National Congress	Mehroni	Lost	4,334	1.29%	1,80,444	
