= Macuata East Cakaudrove (Indian Communal Constituency, Fiji) =

Former electoral constituency in Fiji

Macuata East Cakaudrove Indian Communal is a former electoral division of Fiji, one of 19 communal constituencies reserved for Indo-Fijians. Established by the 1997 Constitution, it came into being in 1999 and was used for the parliamentary elections of 1999, 2001, and 2006. (Of the remaining 52 seats, 27 were reserved for other ethnic communities and 25, called Open Constituencies, were elected by universal suffrage). The electorate covered eastern areas of the northern island of Vanua Levu.

The 2013 Constitution promulgated by the Military-backed interim government abolished all constituencies and established a form of proportional representation, with the entire country voting as a single electorate.

== Election results ==
In the following tables, the primary vote refers to first-preference votes cast. The final vote refers to the final tally after votes for low-polling candidates have been progressively redistributed to other candidates according to pre-arranged electoral agreements (see electoral fusion), which may be customized by the voters (see instant run-off voting).

=== 1999 ===
Candidate	Political party	Votes	%
Giyannedra Prasad	Fiji Labour Party (FLP)	4,203	59.84
Satish Chandra Gulabdas	National Federation Party (NFP)	2,297	32.70
David Manohar Lal	Fijian Association Party (FAP)	362	5.15
Dayal Patel	UNLP	162	2.31
Total		7,024	100.00

=== 2001 ===
Candidate	Political party	Votes	%
Ram Sharan	Fiji Labour Party (FLP)	4,717	75.50
Satish Chandra Gulabdas	National Federation Party (NFP)	1,274	20.39
Pratap Pardip Chandra	New Labour Unity Party (NLUP)	220	3.52
Munesh Prasad	Soqosoqo Duavata ni Lewenivanua (SDL)	37	0.59
Total		6,248	100.00

=== 2006 ===
Candidate	Political party	Votes	%
Vijay Chand	Fiji Labour Party (FLP)	5,298	83.29
Kamal Kumar Raj	National Federation Party (NFP)	632	9.94
James Venkat Sami	National Alliance Party	350	5.50
Chitra Singh	Soqosoqo Duavata ni Lewenivanua (SDL)	81	1.27
Total		6,361	100.00

== Sources ==
- Psephos - Adam Carr's electoral archive
- Fiji Facts
