= Tej Narayan Pandey =

Indian politician

Member of the Uttar Pradesh Legislative Assembly
- In office 15 March 2012 – 19 March 2017
- Preceded by: Lallu Singh
- Succeeded by: Ved Prakash Gupta
- Constituency: Ayodhya

Personal details
- Born: 1980 or 1981 (age 45–46)
- Party: Samajwadi Party
- Education: Lucknow University, 2003
- Profession: Politician

Tej Narayan Pandey is an Indian politician. He represented Ayodhya as a Member of the Uttar Pradesh Legislative Assembly. He is a member of the Samajwadi Party. He was elected as MLA of the 2012 Uttar Pradesh Legislative Assembly election from Ayodhya.

On February 7, 2013, he was assigned to be the minister for entertainment tax (independent Charge) in the newly elected Akhilesh Yadav government. On June 17, 2014, Pandey stepped down from Akhilesh Yadav ministry, while continuing to be part of the party executive committee.

== Early life ==
Pandey was born to Rajbhushan and hails from Ayodhya in Uttar Pradesh. He did his post graduation work at Lucknow University in 2003.

== Political career ==
Pandey joined the Samajwadi party in 1998. He was elected vice-president of Lucknow University in 2004. He is a member of Akhilesh yadav, or "Team Eleven".

Some of his efforts were recognized by the people of Faizabad for his approval of a medical college there.

Pandey was the seventh Akhilesh aide in a prominent post only to be expelled by Shivpal within a month.

He lost his seat in the 2017 Uttar Pradesh Assembly election to Ved Prakash Gupta of the Bharatiya Janata Party.He contested the 2022 Uttar Pradesh Legislative Assembly election from Ayodhya but lost to Bharatiya Janata Party candidate Ved Prakash Gupta by a margin of 19,990 votes. In October 2026, he was declared as the Samajwadi Party's first candidate for the 2027 Uttar Pradesh Legislative Assembly election from Ayodhya by party president Akhilesh Yadav.
