= Manju Tyagi =

Indian politician

Member of the Uttar Pradesh legislative assembly
- Incumbent
- Assumed office 2017
- Preceded by: Ramsaran
- Constituency: Sri Nagar, Lakhimpur, Uttar Pradesh

Personal details
- Party: Bharatiya Janata Party
- Occupation: MLA
- Profession: Politician

Manju Tyagi is an Indian politician and a member of 17th Legislative Assembly, Uttar Pradesh of India. She represents the ‘Sri Nagar’ constituency in Lakhimpur Kheri district of Uttar Pradesh.

== Political career ==
Tyagi contested Uttar Pradesh Assembly Election as Bharatiya Janata Party candidate and defeated her close contestant Meera Bano from Samajwadi Party with a margin of 54,939 votes.

== Posts held ==
#	From	To	Position	Comments
01	March 2017	Incumbent	Member, 17th Legislative Assembly	
