= Ram Sharan =

Fijian politician

Member of House of Representatives (Fiji) Macuata East Cakaudrove Indian Communal Constituency
- In office 2001–2006
- Preceded by: Giyannendra Prasad
- Succeeded by: Vijay Chand

Personal details
- Party: Fiji Labour Party

Ram Sharan is a former Fijian politician of Indian descent. From 2001 to 2006, he represented the Macuata East Cakaudrove Indian Communal Constituency, one of 19 reserved for Indo-Fijians, which he held for the Fiji Labour Party (FLP) in the parliamentary elections of 2001 with more than 75 percent of the vote.

In 2003, Sharan was offered the portfolio of Minister for Arts, Culture and Heritage, together with 13 other FLP parliamentarians who were offered cabinet positions by the Prime Minister, Laisenia Qarase but the FLP refused to accept this offer.

He retired from politics at the general election held on 6–13 May 2006.
