= Tamkuhi Raj Assembly constituency =

Constituency of the Uttar Pradesh legislative assembly in India

Coordinates: 26.73°N 84.18°E

Tamkuhi Raj
- Constituency No. 331 for the Uttar Pradesh Legislative Assembly

Constituency details
- Country: India
- Region: North India
- State: Uttar Pradesh
- District: Kushinagar
- Lok Sabha constituency: Deoria Lok Sabha constituency
- Total electors: 3,78,534 (2017)
- Reservation: None

Member of Legislative Assembly
- 18th Uttar Pradesh Legislative Assembly
- Incumbent Asim Kumar
- Party: BJP
- Elected year: 2022

Tamkuhi Raj is a constituency of the Uttar Pradesh Legislative Assembly covering the city of Tamkuhi Raj in the Kushinagar district of Uttar Pradesh, India.

Tamkuhi Raj is one of five assembly constituencies in the Kushinagar Lok Sabha constituency. Since 2008, this assembly constituency is numbered 331 amongst 403 constituencies.

This seat belongs to Asim Kumar, who won in last Assembly election of 2022 Uttar Pradesh Legislative Elections by defeating Congress party candidate by a margin of 66000 votes.

== Member of Legislative Assembly ==
Year	Member	Party
Till 2012 : Constituency did not exist
2012	Ajay Kumar Lallu	Indian National Congress
2017	Ajay Kumar Lallu	Indian National Congress
2022	Asim Kumar	Bharatiya Janata Party

== Election results ==
=== 2027 ===
2027 Uttar Pradesh Legislative Assembly election: Tamkuhi Raj
Party	Candidate	Votes	%	±%
INDIA				
NDA				
BSP				
NOTA	None of the above			
Majority				
Turnout				
gain from		Swing		

=== 2022 ===
2022 Uttar Pradesh Legislative Assembly election: Tamkuhi Raj
Party	Candidate	Votes	%	±%
BJP	Asim Kumar Rai	115,123	50.81	▲30.79
SP	Uday Narayan	48,651	21.47	
INC	Ajay Kumar Lallu	33,496	14.78	▼13.65
BSP	Sanjay	16,854	7.44	▼11.92
CPI	Matiullah	2,263	1.0	
NOTA	None of the above	2,485	1.1	▼0.46
Majority		66,472	29.34	▲20.93
Turnout		226,581	56.6	▼0.27
BJP gain from INC		Swing		

=== 2017 ===
2017 Uttar Pradesh Legislative Assembly election: Tamkuhi Raj
Party	Candidate	Votes	%	±%
INC	Ajay Kumar Lallu	61,211	28.43	
BJP	Jagdish Mishra	43,097	20.02	
BSP	Bijay Rai	41,685	19.36	
NISHAD	Dr P K Rai	29,759	13.82	
Independent	Nandkishor Mishra	23,423	10.88	
Independent	Shrikant Mishra	3,210	1.49	
Independent	Vishnu Prabhakar	2,858	1.33	
NOTA	None of the above	3,305	1.56	
Majority		18,114	8.41	
Turnout		215,288	56.87	
INC hold		Swing	+1.85	

=== 2012 ===
2012 Uttar Pradesh Legislative Assembly election: Tamkuhi Raj
Party	Candidate	Votes	%	±%
INC	Ajay Kumar Lallu	53,121	27.03	
BJP	Nand Kishor Mishra	47,261	24.05	
SP	Dr P K Rai	39,759	20.23	
BSP	Manish Kumar Jaiswal	26,153	13.31	
PECP	Surendra Prasad Gupta	17,295	8.80	
Majority		5,860	2.98	
Turnout		1,96,516	56.42	
INC win (new seat)				
