= Ayodhya Assembly constituency =

Legislative assembly in Uttar Pradesh, India

Coordinates: 26.79°N 82.20°E

Ayodhya
- Constituency No. 275 for the Uttar Pradesh Legislative Assembly

Constituency details
- Country: India
- Region: North India
- State: Uttar Pradesh
- District: Ayodhya
- Lok Sabha constituency: Faizabad
- Total electors: 3,82,056
- Reservation: None

Member of Legislative Assembly
- 18th Uttar Pradesh Legislative Assembly
- Incumbent Ved Prakash Gupta
- Party: Bharatiya Janata Party
- Elected year: 2022

Ayodhya Assembly constituency is a constituency of the Uttar Pradesh Legislative Assembly covering the city of Ayodhya in the Ayodhya district of Uttar Pradesh, India. It is one of five assembly constituencies in the Faizabad Lok Sabha constituency. Since 2008, this assembly constituency is numbered 275 amongst 403 constituencies.

Bharatiya Janata Party member Ved Prakash Gupta is the incumbent MLA, who won in the 2022 Uttar Pradesh Legislative Assembly election defeating Samajwadi Party candidate Tej Narayan Pandey by a margin of 19,990 votes.

== Members of Legislative Assembly ==
Year	Member	Party
1967	B. Kishore	Bharatiya Jana Sangh
1969	Vishwanath Kapoor	Indian National Congress
1974	Bed Prakash Agarwal	Bharatiya Jana Sangh
1977	Jai Shanker Pandey	Janata Party
1980	Nirmal Kumar	Indian National Congress (I)
1985	Surendra Pratap Singh	Indian National Congress
1989	Jai Shanker Pandey	Janata Dal
1991	Lallu Singh	Bharatiya Janata Party
1993	Lallu Singh	Bharatiya Janata Party
1996	Lallu Singh	Bharatiya Janata Party
2002	Lallu Singh	Bharatiya Janata Party
2007	Lallu Singh	Bharatiya Janata Party
2012	Tej Narayan Pandey	Samajwadi Party
2017	Ved Prakash Gupta	Bharatiya Janata Party
2022	Ved Prakash Gupta	Bharatiya Janata Party

== Election results ==
=== 2027 ===
2027 Uttar Pradesh Legislative Assembly election: Ayodhya
Party	Candidate	Votes	%	±%
SP	Pawan Pandey			
NDA				
BSP				
NOTA	None of the above			
Majority				
Turnout				
gain from		Swing		

=== 2022 ===
2022 Uttar Pradesh Legislative Assembly election: Ayodhya
Party	Candidate	Votes	%	±%
BJP	Ved Prakash Gupta	113,414	49.04	▼0.16
SP	Tej Narayan Pandey	93,424	40.4	▲14.39
BSP	Ravi Prakash	17,706	7.66	▼10.53
NOTA	None of the above	1,240	0.54	▼0.18
Majority		19,990	8.64	▼14.55
Turnout		231,258	60.53	▼1.43
BJP hold		Swing		

=== 2017 ===
2017 Uttar Pradesh Legislative Assembly election: Ayodhya
Party	Candidate	Votes	%	±%
BJP	Ved Prakash Gupta	107,014	49.2	
SP	Tej Narayan Pandey	56,574	26.01	
BSP	Mo Bazmi Siddeke	39,554	18.19	
BMP	Banshi Lal Yadav	5,661	2.6	
NOTA	None of the above	1,544	0.72	
Majority		50,440	23.19	
Turnout		217,488	61.96	
BJP gain from SP		Swing		

=== 2002 ===
2002 Uttar Pradesh Legislative Assembly election: Ayodhya
Party	Candidate	Votes	%	±%
BJP	Lalloo Singh	51,289	38.72	
BSP	Abhay Singh	33,429	25.24	
SP	Ved Prakash Gupta	31,936	24.11	
INC	Ashok Singh	8,368	6.32	
Majority		17,860	13.48	−2.72
Turnout		132,448	47.18	−1.46
BJP hold		Swing		

=== 1996 ===
1996 Uttar Pradesh Legislative Assembly election: Ayodhya
Party	Candidate	Votes	%	±%
BJP	Lalloo Singh	59,658	45.61	
SP	Jai Shankar Pandey	38,463	29.41	
BSP	Om Prakash Verma	28,529	21.81	
Majority		21,195	16.20	+8.75
Turnout		130,791	48.64	−9.00
BJP hold		Swing		

=== 1993 ===
1993 Uttar Pradesh Legislative Assembly election: Ayodhya
Party	Candidate	Votes	%	±%
BJP	Lallu Singh	58,587	47.24	
SP	Jai Shankar Pandey	49,349	39.79	
INC	Surendra Pratap Singh	8,389	6.76	
CPI	Raj Bahadur Yadav	2,059	1.66	
Majority		9,238	7.45	
Turnout		124,013	57.64	
