= Vinod Kumar Shukla (politician) =

Vinod Kumar Shukla (Hindi: विनोद कुमार शुक्ला) is an Indian businessman and social worker.

Shukla is part of the Bhaiya Lal Shukla family of Amahiya Rewa. He was an independent candidate from Mauganj for the Madhya Pradesh State Assembly Elections held on 25 November 2013. He joined the Indian National Congress in 2019.
