= Pramod Tiwari =

Indian politician (born 1952)

Pramod Kumar Tiwari
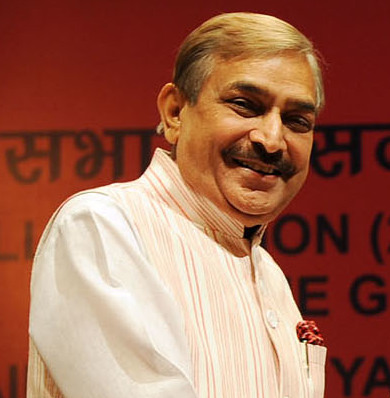
- Tiwari in 2018

Deputy Leader of the Opposition in Rajya Sabha
- Incumbent
- Assumed office 13 March 2023
- Chairman: Jagdeep Dhankhar; C. P. Radhakrishnan
- Leader of Opposition: Mallikarjun Kharge
- Preceded by: P. Chidambaram (interim)

Member of Parliament, Rajya Sabha
- Incumbent
- Assumed office 5 July 2022
- Preceded by: Harshvardhan Singh Dungarpur
- Constituency: Rajasthan
- In office 14 December 2013 – 2 April 2018
- Preceded by: Rasheed Masood
- Succeeded by: G. V. L. Narasimha Rao, BJP
- Constituency: Uttar Pradesh

Member of Uttar Pradesh Legislative Assembly
- In office 1980–2013
- Preceded by: Kunwar Tejbhan Singh
- Succeeded by: Aradhana Misra
- Constituency: Rampur Khas

Personal details
- Born: 16 July 1952 (age 74) Pratapgarh, Uttar Pradesh, India
- Party: Indian National Congress
- Spouse: Alka Tiwari (m. 1973; died 2012)
- Children: Vijayashri (Sona); Aradhana (Mona)
- Website: pramodtiwari.co.in

Pramod Kumar Tiwari (born 16 July 1952) is an Indian politician from the Indian National Congress party. He is currently serving as Deputy Leader of the Opposition in Rajya Sabha, from Rajasthan Rajya Sabha Constituency. He is a nine-time Member of the Legislative Assembly (MLA) from Rampur Khas and former Cabinet Minister in Government of Uttar Pradesh.

== Political career ==
Pramod Kumar Tiwari was chosen as a member of Uttar Pradesh Assembly for the first time in the 1980s. He regularly won the Rampur Khas seat. He was the Cabinet Minister in Government of Uttar Pradesh from 1984 to 1991. Tiwari has won nine times in a row.

In 2007 election, Tiwari defeated Kunwar Viggyat Singh of the Samajwadi Party (SP) by a huge margin and in 2012 election, he defeated Hira Madi Patel of Bahujan Samaj Party by 31,544 votes.

On 6 June 2012, the Congress removed him as the Congress Legislature Party (CLP) leader and replaced him with Pradeep Mathur, a three-term MLA from Mathura.

Pramod Tiwari was chosen as a member of U.P. Assembly for the first time in the 1980 and won record nine times in a row from Rampur Khas seat in Pratapgarh district. He was the minister of U.P. from 1984 to 1989. He was also the Congress legislature party leader for a record time.

He was elected as a Member of Rajya Sabha in 2013 by-elections for the vacant seat due to disqualification of sitting member Rasheed Masood and is a 2 time senior member of Rajya Sabha, served his term till 11 April 2018 and was again elected as Member of Rajya Sabha from Rajasthan in 2022.

== Record ==
9 times Mla
