= Sri Nagar Assembly constituency =

Constituency of the Uttar Pradesh legislative assembly in India

Sri Nagar
- Constituency No. 140 for the Uttar Pradesh Legislative Assembly

Constituency details
- Country: India
- Region: North India
- State: Uttar Pradesh
- District: Lakhimpur
- Total electors: 287,375 (2012)
- Reservation: SC

Member of Legislative Assembly
- 18th Uttar Pradesh Legislative Assembly
- Incumbent Manju Tyagi
- Party: Bharatiya Janata Party
- Elected year: 2017

Sri Nagar is one of the 403 constituencies of the Uttar Pradesh Legislative Assembly, India. It is a part of the Lakhimpur district and one of the five assembly constituencies in the Kheri Lok Sabha constituency. First election in this assembly constituency was held in 1957 after the "DPACO (1956)" (delimitation order) was passed in 1956. After the "Delimitation of Parliamentary and Assembly Constituencies Order" was passed in 2008, the constituency was assigned identification number 140.

== Wards / Areas ==
Extent of Sri Nagar Assembly constituency is KCs Sharda Nagar, Sri Nagar, PCs Manikapur, Saidapur Devkali, Saidapur Bhau, Kodhaiya, Rousa, Manoura, Karanpur Kaimahra, Rukundipur, Kaimahra of Kheri Paila KC, PCs Bhaduri, Choraha, Aithapur, Rampur Gokul, Dhourahra Khurd, Sanigawan, Bhalliya Buzurg, Parsehra Buzurg, Atwa, Siyathu, Sisawakalan, Bijhouli, Umarpur, Shankarpur, Semrai & Sherpur of Paila KC of Lakhimpur Tehsil.

== Members of the Legislative Assembly ==
#	Term	Name	Party	From	To	Days	Comments	Ref
01	01st Vidhan Sabha	-	-	Mar-1952	Mar-1957	1,849	Constituency not in existence	
02	02nd Vidhan Sabha	Vanshidhar Shukla	Praja Socialist Party	Apr-1957	Mar-1962	1,800	-	
02	02nd Vidhan Sabha	Chhedi Lal	Praja Socialist Party	Apr-1957	Mar-1962	1,800	-	
03	03rd Vidhan Sabha	Banshidhar Misra	Praja Socialist Party	Mar-1962	Mar-1967	1,828	-	
04	04th Vidhan Sabha	-	-	Mar-1967	Apr-1968	402	Constituency not in existence	
05	05th Vidhan Sabha	-	-	Feb-1969	Mar-1974	1,832	Constituency not in existence	
06	06th Vidhan Sabha	Raj Brij Raj Singh	Bharatiya Jana Sangh	Mar-1974	Apr-1977	1,153	-	
07	07th Vidhan Sabha	Raj Brij Raj Singh	Janata Party	Jun-1977	Feb-1980	969	-	
08	08th Vidhan Sabha	Upendra Bahadur Singh	Indian National Congress (I)	Jun-1980	Mar-1985	1,735	-	
09	09th Vidhan Sabha	Kamal Ahmed Rizavi	Indian National Congress	Mar-1985	Nov-1989	1,725	-	
10	10th Vidhan Sabha	Kamal Ahmed Rizavi	Indian National Congress	Dec-1989	Apr-1991	488	-	
11	11th Vidhan Sabha	Taj Narain Trivedi	Indian National Congress	Jun-1991	Dec-1992	533	-	
12	12th Vidhan Sabha	Dhirendra Bahadur Singh	Samajwadi Party	Dec-1993	Oct-1995	693	-	
13	13th Vidhan Sabha	Mayavati (Mayaprasad)	Bahujan Samaj Party	Oct-1996	May-2002	1,967	-	
14	14th Vidhan Sabha	Mayavati (Mayaprasad)	Bahujan Samaj Party	Feb-2002	May-2007	1,902	-	
15	15th Vidhan Sabha	R. A. Usmani	Samajwadi Party	May-2007	Mar-2012	1,762	-	
16	16th Vidhan Sabha	Ram Sharan	Samajwadi Party	Mar-2012	Mar-2017	1803	-	
17	17th Vidhan Sabha	Manju Tyagi	Bharatiya Janata Party	Mar-2017	Mar-2022	-	-	
18	18th Vidhan Sabha	Manju Tyagi	Bharatiya Janata Party	Mar-2022	Incumbent			

== Election results ==
=== 2027 ===
2027 Uttar Pradesh Legislative Assembly election: Sri Nagar
Party	Candidate	Votes	%	±%
INDIA				
NDA				
BSP				
NOTA	None of the above			
Majority				
Turnout				
gain from		Swing		

=== 2022 ===
2022 Uttar Pradesh Legislative Assembly election: Sri Nagar
Party	Candidate	Votes	%	±%
BJP	Manju Tyagi	108,249	47.21	▼3.47
SP	Ram Sharan	90,641	39.53	▲13.5
BSP	Meera Bano	23,091	10.07	▼10.01
INC	Chandni Ajaz Ali	2,127	0.93	
NOTA	None of the above	1,624	0.71	▼0.26
Majority		17,608	7.68	▼16.97
Turnout		229,293	71.81	▼0.56
BJP hold		Swing		

=== 2017 ===
2017 Uttar Pradesh Legislative Assembly Election: Sri Nagar
Party	Candidate	Votes	%	±%
BJP	Manju Tyagi	112,941	50.68	
SP	Meera Bano	58,002	26.03	
BSP	Praveen Kumar	44,757	20.08	
NOTA	None of the above	2,141	0.97	
Majority		54,939	24.65	
Turnout		222,865	72.37	

=== 2012 ===
16th Vidhan Sabha: 2012 General Elections

2012 General Elections: Sri Nagar
Party	Candidate	Votes	%	±%
SP	Ram Sharan	69,776	37.46	−
BSP	Sripal Bhargav	37,898	20.35	−
Independent	Rajaram Gautam	24,049	12.91	−
	Remainder 13 candidates	54,538	29.28	−
Majority		31,878	17.11	−
Turnout		186,261	64.81	−
SP hold		Swing		

== See also ==
- Kheri Lok Sabha constituency
- Lakhimpur Kheri district
- Sixteenth Legislative Assembly of Uttar Pradesh
- Uttar Pradesh Legislative Assembly
- Vidhan Bhawan
