= Ved Prakash Gupta =

Indian politician

Member of Uttar Pradesh Legislative Assembly
- Incumbent
- Assumed office 2017
- Preceded by: Tej Narayan Pandey
- Constituency: Ayodhya

Personal details
- Born: 18 February 1948 (age 78) Bombay, Bombay Province, India
- Party: Bharatiya Janata Party
- Spouse: Narvada Gupta
- Children: 3 sons, 2 daughters
- Parent: Kanti Lal Gupta (father)
- Education: B.S.C.
- Occupation: Politician
- Profession: Business; Engineering; Teaching

Ved Prakash Gupta (born 18 February 1948) is an Indian politician from Uttar Pradesh. In 2022, Ved Prakash Gupta, a member of the Bharatiya Janata Party, won from the prestigious Ayodhya Assembly constituency, where the Ram Mandir is located.

He is currently serving as a legislator (MLA) in the 18th Uttar Pradesh Assembly. Previously, he served as a member of the 17th Uttar Pradesh Assembly, representing the Ayodhya Assembly constituency.

== Political career ==
Following the 2022 Uttar Pradesh Legislative Assembly election he was re-elected as an MLA from the Ayodhya Assembly constituency after defeating Samajwadi Party candidate Tej Narayan Pandey by a margin of 19,990 votes.

== See also ==
- Ayodhya
- Ram Mandir
