= Rampur Khas Assembly constituency =

Constituency of the Uttar Pradesh legislative assembly in India

Coordinates: 25.61°N 82.59°E

Rampur Khas
- Constituency No. 244 for the Uttar Pradesh Legislative Assembly

Constituency details
- Country: India
- Region: North India
- State: Uttar Pradesh
- District: Pratapgarh
- Total electors: 3,20,772
- Reservation: None

Member of Legislative Assembly
- 18th Uttar Pradesh Legislative Assembly
- Incumbent Aradhana Misra
- Party: INC
- Alliance: SP+
- Elected year: 2022

Rampur Khas is a constituency of the Uttar Pradesh Legislative Assembly covering the city of Rampur Khas in the Pratapgarh district of Uttar Pradesh, India.

Rampur Khas is one of five assembly constituencies in the Pratapgarh Lok Sabha constituency. Since 2008, this assembly constituency is numbered 244 amongst 403.

== Members of Legislative Assembly ==
Year	Member	Party
1952	Raja Ram Kisan	Indian National Congress
1957	Amola Devi	Indian National Congress
1962	Kunwar Tejbhan Singh	Socialist Party
1967	Ram Anjore Misra	Indian National Congress
1969	Kunwar Tejbhan Singh	Samyukta Socialist Party
1974	Babu Prabhakar Singh	Indian National Congress
1977	Kunwar Tejbhan Singh	Independent
1980	Pramod Tiwari	Indian National Congress
1985	Pramod Tiwari	Indian National Congress
1989	Pramod Tiwari	Indian National Congress
1991	Pramod Tiwari	Indian National Congress
1993	Pramod Tiwari	Indian National Congress
1996	Pramod Tiwari	Indian National Congress
2002	Pramod Tiwari	Indian National Congress
2007	Pramod Tiwari	Indian National Congress
2012	Pramod Tiwari	Indian National Congress
2014^	Aradhana Misra	Indian National Congress
2017	Aradhana Misra	Indian National Congress
2022	Aradhana Misra	Indian National Congress

== Election results ==
=== 2027 ===
2027 Uttar Pradesh Legislative Assembly election: Rampur Khas
Party	Candidate	Votes	%	±%
INC	Aradhana Misra			
NDA				
BSP				
NOTA	None of the above			
Majority				
Turnout				
gain from		Swing		

=== 2022 ===
2022 Uttar Pradesh Legislative Assembly election: Rampur Khas
Party	Candidate	Votes	%	±%
INC	Aradhana Misra	84,334	50.27	+2.53
BJP	Nagesh Pratap Singh	69,593	41.49	+3.75
BSP	Bankelal Patel	4,914	2.93	−1.72
NOTA	None of the above	2,438	1.45	+0.51
Majority		14,741	8.78	−1.22
Turnout		167,754	52.3	−1.74
INC hold		Swing		

=== 2017 ===
Indian National Congress candidate Aradhana Misra won in 2017 Uttar Pradesh Legislative Assembly election defeating Bharatiya Janata Party candidate Nagesh Pratap Singh by a margin of 17,066 votes.

2017 Uttar Pradesh Legislative Assembly election: Rampur Khas
Party	Candidate	Votes	%	±%
INC	Aradhana Misra	81,463	47.74	
BJP	Nagesh Pratap Singh	64,397	37.74	
BSP	Ashok Singh	7,933	4.65	
CPI	Kamaruddin	3,472	2.03	
NCP	Surendra Singh	3,055	1.79	
NOTA	None of the above	1,595	0.94	
Majority		17,066	10.0	
Turnout		170,655	54.04	
INC hold		Swing		

=== 2014 ===
By Election, 2014: Rampur Khas
Party	Candidate	Votes	%	±%
INC	Aradhana Misra	94,076	56.99	
Independent	Nagesh Pratap Singh	26,397	15.99	
BSP	Heera Mani Patel	17,183	10.41	
BJP	Rakesh	9,814	5.94	
SP	Shivendra Bahadur	8,328	5.04	
NOTA	None of the Above	2,201	1.33	
Margin of victory		67,679	41.01	
Turnout		1,65,056	51.84	
INC hold		Swing		

=== 2012 ===
Uttar Pradesh Assembly Election, 2012: Rampur Khas
Party	Candidate	Votes	%	±%
INC	Pramod Tiwari	74,545	49.40	
BSP	Heera Mani Patel	43,011	28.50	
SP	Syed Ahtesham Ahmad	19,684	13.04	
Independent	Lal Sunil Pratap Singh	2,345	1.55	
BJP	Doodhanath	1,986	1.32	
Majority		31,534	20.90	
Turnout		1,50,898	53.15	
INC hold		Swing		

=== 1996 ===
Uttar Pradesh Assembly Election, 1996: Rampur Khas
Party	Candidate	Votes	%	±%
INC	Pramod Tiwari	1,28,635	87.42	
BJP	Krishan Kumar Singh	12,463	8.47	
JD	Ambika Baksha Singh	3,469	2.36	
JP	Surendra Bahadur	646	0.44	
Independent	Krishan Jagannath Singh	487	0.33	
Margin of victory		1,16,172	78.95	
Turnout		1,47,143	60.81	
INC hold		Swing		
