= Ajay Kumar Lallu =

Indian politician (born 1979)

- Ex-President Uttar Pradesh Congress Committee

AICC Incharge for Odisha Pradesh Congress Committee
- Incumbent
- Assumed office 14 February 2025
- Preceded by: Ajoy Kumar

MLA in Legislative Assembly of Uttar Pradesh
- In office March 2012 – March 2022
- Preceded by: Constituency created
- Constituency: Tamkuhi Raj (Assembly constituency)

President of Uttar Pradesh Congress Committee
- In office 7 October 2019 – 16 March 2022
- National President: Sonia Gandhi (Interim)
- Preceded by: Raj Babbar
- Succeeded by: Brijlal Khabri

Personal details
- Born: 4 November 1979 (age 47) TamkuhiRoad, Kushinagar, Uttar Pradesh, India
- Party: Indian National Congress
- Parent: Shivnath Prasad
- Education: Political science from Kishan PG Collage
- Occupation: MLA
- Profession: Agriculture
- As of 10 June, 2020

Ajay Kumar Lallu (born 4 November 1979) is an Indian politician and a member of the 16th and 17th Legislative Assembly of Uttar Pradesh of India, and ex-president of the Uttar Pradesh Congress Committee. He represented the Tamkuhi Raj (Assembly constituency) constituency in the Kushinagar district of Uttar Pradesh. He is a leader of Indian National Congress in Uttar Pradesh.

== Early life and education ==
Lallu was born 4 November 1979 in Seorahi village of Kushinagar district of Uttar Pradesh to his father Shivnath Prasad. Lallu is unmarried. He belongs to Kandu caste. In 2001, he received a postgraduate degree in political science from Kishan PG Collage Seorahi, Kushinagar.

== Political career ==
Lallu started his political journey as general secretary (Students Union) in 1998–99. In 1999-2000 he was on post of president of students union. He was also on post of State Coordinator of Ekta Parishad from 2001 to 2007. In 15th Legislative Assembly of Uttar Pradesh (2007) elections, he contested from Seorahi (Assembly constituency) as an Independent candidate but lost to SP's P K Rai. He stood sixth with 2,891 votes. After election he joined Indian National Congress.

After Delimitation order (2008) Seorahi constituency was abolished by Election Commission of India. In 16th Legislative Assembly of Uttar Pradesh (2012) elections, he got ticket by Indian National Congress from Tamkuhi Raj (Assembly constituency) of Kushinagar district. He was elected MLA by defeating Bhartiya Janata Party candidate Nand Kishor Mishra by a margin of 5,860 votes.

In 17th Legislative Assembly of Uttar Pradesh (2017) elections, he was again elected MLA by defeating the BJP candidate Jagadish Mishra by a margin of 18,114 votes.

In October 2019, seeing his hard work, the Congress Party appointed him as President of the Uttar Pradesh Congress Committee.

== In Media ==
On 20 May 2020, Lallu was arrested in Agra on the issue of prohibiting the entry of buses organized by Congress into Uttar Pradesh. Same day Lallu was granted bail by an Agra court in a case lodged against him for flouting the norms of lockdown and staging protests along with his party men while squatting on the road. But before being released on bail, he was rearrested by a team of Lucknow police in a second case related to alleged forgery and cheating filed in connection with the Congress' standoff with the UP government over the arrangement of buses for migrant workers. He was sent to judicial custody for 14 days.

After that, he was tested for COVID-19 at Mahanagar Civil Hospital and kept in a temporary jail till the test result came. Meanwhile, talking to reporters in Lucknow during his medical examination, Lallu said: "Such cases and jail sentences are a reward for a political worker. The government can heap cases on me and keep me in jail but they should provide immediate relief to migrant workers." After the report of Corona-19 came negative, the police shifted Lallu from temporary jail to district jail.

On 16 June 2020, The Allahabad High Court granted bail to UP Congress chief Ajay Kumar Lallu questioning his party's offer to provide buses for migrant workers.

== Posts held ==
#	From	To	Position	Comments
01	March 2012	March 2017	Member, 16th Legislative Assembly of Uttar Pradesh	
02	March 2017	March 2022	Member, 17th Legislative Assembly of Uttar Pradesh	
03	June 2019	Oct 2019	Leader, Congress Legislature Party	
04	Oct 2019	Oct 2022	President, Uttar Pradesh Congress Committee	

Party political offices
Preceded by Raj Babbar	President; Uttar Pradesh Congress Committee; 7 October 2019 – present	Incumbent
