= Electoral history of Atal Bihari Vajpayee =

Elections featuring Prime Minister of India

This is a summary of the electoral history of Atal Bihari Vajpayee, who was Prime Minister of India in 1996 and from 1998-99 & 1999-2004. He was the leader of Bhartiya Janata Party from 1989 to 2004. He was elected ten times to Lok Sabha, the lower house of the Indian parliament. He also served as a member of Rajya Sabha, the upper house for two terms.

Vajpayee was elected to the Indian parliament for the first time in 1957 representing Balrampur. He was further elected to the Lok Sabha nine times from 1967 to 2004 with the only exception of 1984.

== Summary ==
=== Rajya Sabha elections ===
Election	House	Constituency	Term in office	Party
1962	Rajya Sabha	Uttar Pradesh	1962-1967	Bharatiya Jana Sangh
1986	Rajya Sabha	Madhya Pradesh	1986-1991	Bharatiya Janata Party

=== Lok Sabha elections ===
Election results
Term	Year	Constituency	Party	Result
1952-57	1955	Lucknow	Bharatiya Jana Sangh	Lost
1957-62	1957	Balrampur	Bharatiya Jana Sangh	Won
1957-62	1957	Mathura	Bharatiya Jana Sangh	Lost
1957-62	1957	Lucknow	Bharatiya Jana Sangh	Lost
1962-67	1962	Balrampur	Bharatiya Jana Sangh	Lost
1962-67	1962	Lucknow	Bharatiya Jana Sangh	Lost
1967-72	1967	Balrampur	Bharatiya Jana Sangh	Won
1971-77	1971	Gwalior	Bharatiya Jana Sangh	Won
1977-80	1977	New Delhi	Janata Party	Won
1980-84	1980	New Delhi	Janata Party	Won
1984-89	1984	Gwalior	Bharatiya Janata Party	Lost
1991-96	1991	Lucknow	Bharatiya Janata Party	Won
1996-98	1996	Gandhinagar	Bharatiya Janata Party	Won
1996-98	1996	Lucknow	Bharatiya Janata Party	Won
1998-99	1998	Lucknow	Bharatiya Janata Party	Won
1999-04	1999	Lucknow	Bharatiya Janata Party	Won
2004-09	2004	Lucknow	Bharatiya Janata Party	Won

== Detailed results ==
=== 1955 bypoll results ===
1955 By Election:Lucknow Central
Party	Candidate	Votes	%	±%
INC	Sheorajvati Nehru	49,324	41.83	
PSP	Tirloki Singh	34,578	29.33	
ABJS	Atal Bihari Vajpayee	33,986	28.82	
Majority		14,746	12.50	
Turnout		1,17,888	33.35	
INC hold		Swing		

=== General election 1957 ===
1957 Indian general election:Balrampur
Party	Candidate	Votes	%	±%
ABJS	Atal Bihari Vajpayee	118,380	52.16	
INC	Hyder Hussain	108,568	47.84	
Majority		9,812	4.32	
Turnout		226,948	51.25	
Registered electors		442,845		
ABJS win (new seat)				

1957 Indian general election:Mathura
Party	Candidate	Votes	%	±%
Independent	Raja Mahendra Pratap	95,202	40.68	
INC	Digambar Singh	69,209	29.57	
Independent	Pooran	29,177	12.47	
ABJS	Atal Bihari Vajpayee	23,620	10.09	
Independent	Sugrib Singh	8,993	3.84	
Independent	Shankar Rao	7,818	3.34	
Majority		25,993	11.1	
Turnout		234,019	55.27	
Registered electors		423,432		
Independent hold		Swing		

1957 Indian general election:Lucknow
Party	Candidate	Votes	%	±%
INC	Pulin Behari Banerji	69,519	40.75	
ABJS	Atal Bihari Vajpayee	57,034	33.44	
CPI	Fazal Abbas Kazmi	28,542	16.73	
Majority		12,485	7.31	
Turnout		1,70,579	45.12	
INC hold		Swing		

=== General election 1962 ===
1962 Indian general election:Lucknow
Party	Candidate	Votes	%	±%
INC	B. K. Dhaon	116,637	50.45	▲9.70
ABJS	Atal Bihari Vajpayee	86,620	37.47	▲4.03
Independent	Jagdish Gandhi	14,774	6.39	
Socialist Party (India)	M. A. Haleem	6,928	3.00	
ABHM	Radhey Shyam	4,356	1.88	
Independent	Sahzada Israt	1,869	0.81	
Majority		30,017	12.98	
Turnout		238,485	58.49	
Registered electors		407,726		
INC hold		Swing		

1962 Indian general election:Balrampur
Party	Candidate	Votes	%	±%
INC	Subhadra Joshi	102,260	43.33	▼4.51
ABJS	Atal Bihari Vajpayee	100,208	42.46	▼7.70
SWA	Ahmad Nasir Usmani	24,575	10.41	
ABHM	Swaroop Nath	5,046	2.14	
Independent	Vishwa Nath Agarwal	3,934	1.67	
Majority		2,052	0.87	
Turnout		244,330	52.36	
Registered electors		466,671		
INC gain from ABJS		Swing		

=== General election 1967 ===
1967 Indian general election:Balrampur
Party	Candidate	Votes	%	±%
ABJS	Atal Bihari Vajpayee	142,446	50.48	▲8.02
INC	Subhadra Joshi	110,704	39.23	▼4.10
SWA	K Kesan	29,011	10.28	
Majority		31,742	11.25	
Turnout		295,579	55.28	
Registered electors		534,711		
ABJS gain from INC		Swing		

=== General election 1971 ===
1971 Indian general election:Gwalior
Party	Candidate	Votes	%	±%
ABJS	Atal Bihari Vajpayee	188,995	59.33	▼3.37
INC	Gautam Sharma	118,685	37.26	▲22.5
ABHM	Brijnarayan Brajesh	7,722	2.42	
Independent	Madanlal	3,150	0.99	
Majority		70,310	22.07	
Turnout		331,716	58.39	
Registered electors		568,108		
ABJS hold		Swing		

=== General election 1977 ===
1967 Indian general election:New Delhi
Party	Candidate	Votes	%	±%
JP	Atal Bihari Vajpayee	1,25,936	71.26	
INC	Shashi Bhushan	48,750	27.58	▼36.8
Majority		77,186	43.68	
Turnout		1,78,112	65.80	
Registered electors		270,702		
JP gain from INC		Swing		

=== General election 1980 ===
1980 Indian general election:New Delhi
Party	Candidate	Votes	%	±%
JP	Atal Bihari Vajpayee	94,098	48.52	
INC(I)	C. M. Stephen	89,053	45.92	
JP(S)	Rajinder Puri	4,682	2.41	
INC(U)	Mukul Banerjee	762	0.39	
Majority		5,045	2.60	
Turnout		1,96,112	65.14	
Registered electors		301,071		
JP hold		Swing		

=== General election 1984 ===
1984 Indian general election:Gwalior
Party	Candidate	Votes	%	±%
INC	Madhav Rao Scindia	307,735	66.71	
BJP	Atal Bihari Vajpayee	132,141	28.65	
Majority		175,594	38.06	
Turnout		471,068	66.87	
Registered electors		704,433		
INC gain from JP		Swing		

=== General election 1991 ===
1991 Indian general election:Lucknow
Party	Candidate	Votes	%	±%
BJP	Atal Bihari Vajpayee	1,94,886	50.90	
INC	Ranjeet Singh	77,583	20.26	
JP	Heeru Saxena	59,385	15.51	
JD	Mandhata Singh	22,357	5.84	
BSP	Balbir Singh Saluja	13,728	3.59	
Majority		1,17,303	30.64	
Turnout		3,82,877	32.23	
BJP gain from JD		Swing	16.82	

=== General election 1996 ===
1996 Indian general election:Gandhinagar
Party	Candidate	Votes	%	±%
BJP	Atal Bihari Vajpayee	323,583	66.38	▲8.41
INC	Popatlal V. Patel	134,711	27.63	▼9.93
Margin of victory		188,872	38.75	▲18.74
Turnout		487,496	27.81	▼17.05
BJP hold		Swing		

1996 Indian general election:Lucknow
Party	Candidate	Votes	%	±%
BJP	Atal Bihari Vajpayee	3,94,865	52.25	
SP	Raj Babbar	2,76,194	36.55	
BSP	Ved Prakash Grover	42,993	5.69	
INC	Om Pathak	19,042	2.42	
Independent	Ramdev	3,639	0.48	
Majority		1,18,671	15.70	
Turnout		7,55,746	50.78	
BJP hold		Swing		

=== General election 1998 ===
1998 Indian general election:Lucknow
Party	Candidate	Votes	%	±%
BJP	Atal Bihari Vajpayee	4,31,738	57.82	
SP	Muzaffar Ali	2,15,475	28.86	
BSP	Dau Ji Gupta	56,887	7.62	
INC	Ranjeet Singh	38,636	5.17	
Independent	Kumari Katori Devi	1,099	0.15	
Majority		2,16,263	28.96	
Turnout		7,46,669	49.35	
BJP hold		Swing		

=== General election 1999 ===
1999 Indian general election:Lucknow
Party	Candidate	Votes	%	±%
BJP	Atal Bihari Vajpayee	3,62,709	48.11	
INC	Karan Singh	2,39,085	31.71	
SP	Bhagwati Singh	78,826	10.46	
BSP	Ijaharul Haque	43,948	5.83	
Independent	Vijay Agarwal	8,527	1.13	
Majority		1,23,624	16.40	
Turnout		7,53,943	48.57	
BJP hold		Swing		

=== General election 2004 ===
2004 Indian general elections:Lucknow
Party	Candidate	Votes	%	±%
BJP	Atal Bihari Vajpayee	3,24,714	56.12	+21.19
SP	Madhu Gupta	1,06,339	18.38	+7.92
Independent	Ram Jethmalani	57,685	9.97	N/A
BSP	Nasir Ali Siddiqui	53,566	9.26	−7.86
SAP	Krishna Pal	6,928	1.20	
Majority		2,18,375	37.74	+21.34
Turnout		5,78,556	35.28	−13.29
BJP hold		Swing		

== See also ==
- Electoral history of the Bharatiya Janata Party
- Electoral history of L. K. Advani
- Electoral history of Narendra Modi
- Electoral history of Rajnath Singh
- Electoral history of Yogi Adityanath
