= Electoral history of Rajnath Singh =

Elections featuring Indian politician

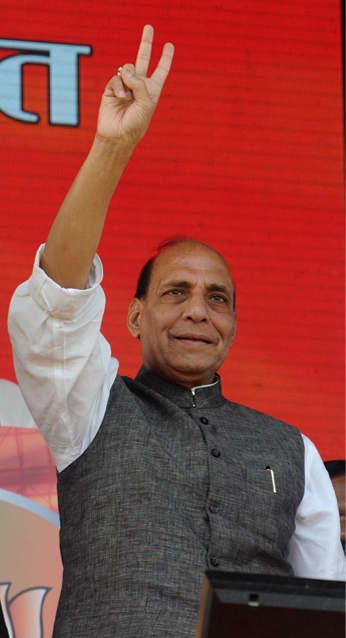
Singh at Hunkar Rally.

This article contains a detailed summary of the electoral history of Rajnath Singh, who serves as the Minister of Defence of India since 2019 and a member of Lok Sabha from Lucknow since May 2014. He has previously served as Chief minister of Uttar Pradesh and Minister of Home Affairs in First Modi ministry. He has also served twice as national president of the Bharatiya Janata Party.

== Summary ==
=== Lok Sabha elections ===
| Year | Constituency | Party | Votes | %age | Result |
|---|---|---|---|---|---|
| 2009 | Ghaziabad | BJP | 3,59,637 | 43.34 | Won |
| 2014 | Lucknow | BJP | 5,61,106 | 54.27 | Won |
| 2019 | Lucknow | BJP | 6,33,026 | 56.70 | Won |
| 2024 | Lucknow | BJP | 6,12,709 | 53.89 | Won |

=== Legislative Assembly elections ===
| Year | Constituency | State | Party | Votes | %age | Result |
|---|---|---|---|---|---|---|
| 1977 | Mirzapur | Uttar Pradesh | JP | 35,110 | 56.37 | Won |
| 1980 | Mirzapur | Uttar Pradesh | BJP | 26,866 | 22.92 | Lost |
| 1985 | Mirzapur | Uttar Pradesh | BJP | 20,645 | 35.66 | Lost |
| 1993 | Mohana | Uttar Pradesh | BJP | 58,572 | 38.28 | Lost |
| 2001 (by-election) | Haidergarh | Uttar Pradesh | BJP | 70,231 | 50.15 | Won |
| 2002 | Haidergarh | Uttar Pradesh | BJP | 70,993 | 52.65 | Won |

=== Rajya Sabha elections ===
| Election | House | Constituency | Term in office | Party |
|---|---|---|---|---|
| 1994 | Rajya Sabha | Uttar Pradesh | 1994-2000 | Bharatiya Janata Party |
| 2000 | Rajya Sabha | Uttar Pradesh | 2000-2001 | Bharatiya Janata Party |
| 2002 | Rajya Sabha | Uttar Pradesh | 2002-2008 | Bharatiya Janata Party |

=== Legislative Council elections ===
| Year | Constituency | State | Term in office | Party |
|---|---|---|---|---|
| 1988 | elected by MLA's | Uttar Pradesh | 1988-1994 | BJP |

== Detailed results ==
=== Lok Sabha ===
2024 general elections

2024 Indian general elections: Lucknow
| Party | Candidate | Votes | % | ±% |
|---|---|---|---|---|
| BJP | Rajnath Singh | 612,709 | 53.89 | −2.81 |
| SP | Ravidas Mehrotra | 4,77,550 | 42.00 | +16.41 |
| BSP | Mohd Sarwar Malik | 30,192 | 2.66 | +2.66 |
| NOTA | None of the Above | 7,350 | 0.65 | −0.01 |
| Majority | | 1,35,159 | 11.89 | −19.22 |
| Turnout | | 11,36,892 | 52.34 | −2.38 |
| BJP hold | | Swing | | |

2019 general elections

2019 Indian general elections: Lucknow
| Party | Candidate | Votes | % | ±% |
|---|---|---|---|---|
| BJP | Rajnath Singh | 633,026 | 56.70 | +2.43 |
| SP | Poonam Sinha | 2,85,724 | 25.59 | +20.10 |
| INC | Acharya Pramod Krishnam | 1,80,011 | 16.12 | −11.77 |
| NOTA | None of the Above | 7,416 | 0.66 | +0.21 |
| Majority | | 3,47,302 | 31.11 | +4.73 |
| Turnout | | 11,16,445 | 54.72 | +1.70 |
| BJP hold | | Swing | +2.43 | |

2014 general elections

2014 Indian general elections: Lucknow
| Party | Candidate | Votes | % | ±% |
|---|---|---|---|---|
| BJP | Rajnath Singh | 561,106 | 54.27 | +19.34 |
| INC | Rita Bahuguna Joshi | 2,88,357 | 27.89 | −0.04 |
| BSP | Nakul Dubey | 64,449 | 6.23 | −16.65 |
| SP | Abhishek Mishra | 56,771 | 5.49 | −5.03 |
| AAP | Jaaved Jaffrey | 41,429 | 4.01 | N/A |
| NOTA | None of the Above | 4,696 | 0.45 | +0.45 |
| Majority | | 2,72,749 | 26.38 | +19.38 |
| Turnout | | 10,33,883 | 53.02 | +17.69 |
| BJP hold | | Swing | +19.34 | |

2009 General election

2009 Indian general elections: Ghaziabad
| Party | Candidate | Votes | % | ±% |
|---|---|---|---|---|
| BJP | Rajnath Singh | 359,637 | 43.34 | |
| INC | Surendra Prakash Goyal | 268,956 | 32.41 | |
| BSP | Amarpal Sharma | 180,285 | 21.73 | |
| Majority | | 90,681 | 10.93 | |
| Turnout | | 829,823 | 45.30 | |
| BJP win (new seat) | | | | |

=== Legislative Assembly ===
2002 Legislative elections

2002 Uttar Pradesh Legislative Assembly election: Haidergarh
| Party | Candidate | Votes | % | ±% |
|---|---|---|---|---|
| BJP | Rajnath Singh | 70,993 | 52.65 | +2.5 |
| SP | Arvind Singh | 45,357 | 33.64 | +12.31 |
| BSP | Hari Ram Singh | 8,740 | 6.48 | −13.98 |
| INC | Vishwanath Chaturvedi | 2,378 | 1.76 | +0.58 |
| Majority | | 25,636 | 19.01 | |
| Turnout | | 1,34,846 | 63.39 | |
| BJP hold | | Swing | | |

2001 by-elections

2001 Uttar Pradesh Legislative Assembly by-elections: Haidergarh
| Party | Candidate | Votes | % | ±% |
|---|---|---|---|---|
| BJP | Rajnath Singh | 70,221 | 50.15 | +25.09 |
| SP | Rampal Verma | 29,867 | 21.33 | −11.71 |
| BSP | Mata Prasad Chaudhary | 28,650 | 20.46 | new |
| INC | Sarvesh Vajpai | 1,649 | 1.17 | −35.09 |
| Majority | | 40,354 | 28.82 | |
| Turnout | | 1,40,030 | 67.02 | +4.66 |
| BJP gain from INC | | Swing | | |

1993 Legislative elections

1993 Uttar Pradesh Legislative Assembly election: Mohana
| Party | Candidate | Votes | % | ±% |
|---|---|---|---|---|
| SP | Rajendra Prasad | 66,540 | 43.49 | new |
| BJP | Rajnath Singh | 58,572 | 38.28 | +8.52 |
| INC | Vinod Kumar | 18,683 | 12.21 | −3.32 |
| JD | Masood Afzal | 2,378 | 1.76 | −8.28 |
| Majority | | 7,968 | 5.21 | |
| Turnout | | 1,52,999 | 55.59 | |
| SP gain from BJP | | Swing | | |

1985 Legislative elections

1985 Uttar Pradesh Legislative Assembly election: Mirzapur
| Party | Candidate | Votes | % | ±% |
|---|---|---|---|---|
| INC | Asraf Imam | 24,834 | 42.9 | +2.41 |
| BJP | Rajnath Singh | 20,645 | 35.66 | +12.73 |
| LKD | Shiv Shankar | 5,293 | 9.14 | new |
| JP | Ramdhani | 549 | 0.95 | +0.24 |
| Majority | | 4,189 | 7.24 | |
| Turnout | | 57,891 | 42.16 | −9.88 |
| INC hold | | Swing | | |

1980 Legislative elections

1980 Uttar Pradesh Legislative Assembly election: Mirzapur
| Party | Candidate | Votes | % | ±% |
|---|---|---|---|---|
| INC(I) | Azahar Imam | 26,866 | 40.49 | +4.6 |
| BJP | Rajnath Singh | 15,206 | 22.92 | new |
| JP(S) | Asha Ram | 11,770 | 17.17 | new |
| INC(U) | Mata Prasad | 6,409 | 9.66 | new |
| Majority | | 11,660 | 17.57 | |
| Turnout | | 66,354 | 52.04 | −2.2 |
| INC gain from JP | | Swing | | |

1977 Legislative elections

1977 Uttar Pradesh Legislative Assembly election: Mirzapur
| Party | Candidate | Votes | % | ±% |
|---|---|---|---|---|
| JP | Rajnath Singh | 35,110 | 56.37 | new |
| INC | Azahar Imam | 22,355 | 35.89 | +6.11 |
| Independent | Dina Nath | 1912 | 3.07 | new |
| Majority | | 12,755 | 20.48 | |
| Turnout | | 62,248 | 54.6 | −4.33 |
| INC hold | | Swing | | |

== See also ==
- Electoral history of the Bharatiya Janata Party
- Electoral history of Atal Bihari Vajpayee
- Electoral history of L. K. Advani
- Electoral history of Narendra Modi
- Electoral history of Yogi Adityanath
