= Electoral history of Yogi Adityanath =

Elections featuring Chief Minister of Uttar Pradesh

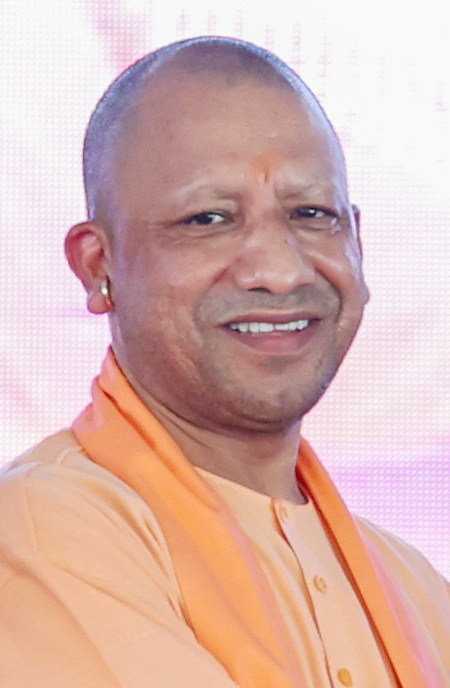

This is a summary of the electoral history of Yogi Adityanath, who is currently serving as the 21st Chief Minister of Uttar Pradesh, since March 2017.

== Summary ==
=== Lok Sabha elections ===
Year	Constituency	Party	Votes	%	Result
1998	Gorakhpur	BJP	268,428	42.62	Won
1999	Gorakhpur	BJP	267,382	41.10	Won
2004	Gorakhpur	BJP	353,647	51.31	Won
2009	Gorakhpur	BJP	403,156	53.85	Won
2014	Gorakhpur	BJP	539,127	51.83	Won

=== Uttar Pradesh Legislative Council elections ===
Year	Constituency	Party	Votes	%	Result
2017	Members of the Uttar Pradesh Legislative Assembly	BJP	Unopposed		Won

=== Uttar Pradesh Legislative Assembly elections ===
Year	Constituency	Party	Votes	%	Result
2022	Gorakhpur Urban	BJP	165,499	66.18	Won

== Detailed results ==
=== Lok Sabha elections ===
==== 1998 Lok Sabha elections ====
General Election, 1998: Gorakhpur
Party	Candidate	Votes	%	±%
BJP	Yogi Adityanath	268,428	42.62	
SP	Jamuna Prasad Nishad	2,42,222	38.46	
BSP	Prahlad Yadav	85,282	13.54	
INC	Harikesh Bahadur	22,621	3.59	
AD(K)	Sant Lal Jaiswal	3,892	0.62	
Majority		26,206	4.16	
Turnout		6,29,765	50.53	
BJP hold		Swing		

==== 1999 Lok Sabha elections ====
General Election, 1999: Gorakhpur
Party	Candidate	Votes	%	±%
BJP	Yogi Adityanath	267,382	41.10	
SP	Jamuna Prasad Nishad	2,60,043	39.97	
BSP	D. P. Yadav	93,852	13.43	
INC	Dr. Jamal Ahmad	20,026	3.08	
JD(S)	Bankey Lal	2,723	0.42	
Majority		7,339	1.13	
Turnout		6,50,545	51.58	
BJP hold		Swing		

==== 2004 Lok Sabha elections ====
General Election, 2004: Gorakhpur
Party	Candidate	Votes	%	±%
BJP	Yogi Adityanath	353,647	51.31	+10.21
SP	Jamuna Prasad Nishad	2,11,608	30.70	−9.27
BSP	Pradeep Kumar Nishad	70,449	10.22	−4.21
INC	Shardendu Pandey	33,477	4.86	+1.78
Independent	Ram Milan	8,785	1.27	0
AD(K)	Chandra Bhan Singh Patel	3,225	0.47	0
SBSP	Gopal Rajbhar	3,081	0.45	0
Independent	Ram Kishum	2,716	0.39	0
ABHM	Mahanth Ramdas Brahmchari	2,260	0.33	0
Majority		1,42,309	20.61	+19.48
Turnout		6,89,248	48.13	−3.45
BJP hold		Swing	+10.21	

==== 2009 Lok Sabha elections ====
2009 Indian general elections: Gorakhpur
Party	Candidate	Votes	%	±%
BJP	Yogi Adityanath	403,156	53.85	+2.34
BSP	Vinay Shankar Tiwari	1,82,885	24.43	+14.21
SP	Manoj Tiwari	83,059	11.09	−19.61
INC	Lalchand Nishad	30,262	4.04	−0.82
Independent	Chhedilal	8,953	1.20	0
Independent	Niranjan Prasad	6,519	0.87	0
Independent	Govind	4,829	0.65	0
Ambedkar Samaj Party	Aman	3,007	0.40	0
Independent	Harishchandra	2,944	0.39	0
AD(K)	Divyashankar Nishad	2,353	0.31	−0.16
Independent	Awdhesh Singh	2,232	0.30	0
Majority		2,20,271	29.42	+8.81
Turnout		7,48,617	44.13	−4.00
BJP hold		Swing	+2.34	

==== 2014 Lok Sabha elections ====
2014 Indian general elections: Gorakhpur
Party	Candidate	Votes	%	±%
BJP	Yogi Adityanath	539,127	51.83	−2.02
SP	Rajmati Nishad	2,26,344	21.76	+10.67
BSP	Ram Bhuwal Nishad	1,76,412	16.96	−7.47
INC	Astbhuja Prasad Tripathi	45,719	4.40	+0.36
AAP	Radhe Mohan Misra	11,873	1.14	N/A
NOTA	None of the Above	8,153	0.78	N/A
Majority		3,12,783	30.07	+0.65
Turnout		10,40,199	54.63	+10.50
BJP hold		Swing	-2.02	

=== Uttar Pradesh Legislative Assembly elections ===
==== 2022 ====
2022 Uttar Pradesh Legislative Assembly election: Gorakhpur Urban
Party	Candidate	Votes	%	±%
BJP	Yogi Adityanath	165,499	66.18	▲10.33
SP	Kalyan Chaudhary	62,109	24.84	New
BSP	Khwaja Shamsuddin	8,023	3.21	▼7.90
ASP(KR)	Chandrashekhar Azad	2640	1.20	New
INC	Chetna Pandey	2,880	1.15	▼26.95
RRP	Ram Davan Maurya	490	0.2	New
NOTA	None of the Above	1,194	0.48	▲0.10
Majority		1,03,390	41.34	▲13.59
Turnout			53.8	▲2.68
BJP hold		Swing	▲10.33	

== See also ==
- Electoral history of the Bharatiya Janata Party
- Electoral history of Atal Bihari Vajpayee
- Electoral history of L. K. Advani
- Electoral history of Narendra Modi
- Electoral history of Rajnath Singh
