= Lucknow North Assembly constituency =

Constituency of the Uttar Pradesh legislative assembly in India

Lucknow North
- Constituency No. 172 for the Uttar Pradesh Legislative Assembly

Constituency details
- Country: India
- Region: North India
- State: Uttar Pradesh
- District: Lucknow
- Lok Sabha constituency: Lucknow
- Total electors: 424,848
- Reservation: None

Member of Legislative Assembly
- 18th Uttar Pradesh Legislative Assembly
- Incumbent Neeraj Bora
- Party: BJP
- Alliance: NDA
- Elected year: 2022

Lucknow North is a constituency of the Uttar Pradesh Legislative Assembly covering the city of Northern part of Lucknow in the Lucknow district of Uttar Pradesh, India.

Lucknow North is one of five assembly constituencies in the Lucknow Lok Sabha constituency. Since 2008, this assembly constituency is numbered 172 amongst 403 constituencies.

Currently this seat belongs to Bharatiya Janata Party candidate Neeraj Bora who won in last Assembly election of 2022 Uttar Pradesh Legislative Elections defeating Samajwadi Party candidate Pooja Shukla by a margin of 33,953 votes.

== Members of the Legislative Assembly ==
Year	Member	Party
Till 2012 : Constituency did not exist
2012	Abhishek Mishra	Samajwadi Party
2017	Neeraj Bora	Bharatiya Janata Party
2022	Neeraj Bora	Bharatiya Janata Party

== Election results ==
Vote share of winning candidates
2022	53.30%
2017	48.27%
2012	28.11%

=== 2027 ===
2027 Uttar Pradesh Legislative Assembly election: Lucknow North
Party	Candidate	Votes	%	±%
BJP				
INDIA				
BSP				
NOTA	None of the above			
Majority				
Turnout				
gain from		Swing		

=== 2022 ===
2022 Uttar Pradesh Legislative Assembly election: Lucknow North
Party	Candidate	Votes	%	±%
BJP	Neeraj Bora	139,159	53.3	▲5.03
SP	Pooja Shukla	105,206	40.29	▲4.06
BSP	Mohd Sarwar Malik	8,945	3.43	▼9.8
INC	Ajay Kumar Srivastava	3,236	1.24	
NOTA	None of the above	1,342	0.51	▼0.1
Majority		33,953	13.01	▲0.97
Turnout		261,099	56.29	▲0.14
BJP hold		Swing		

=== 2017 ===
U. P. Legislative Assembly Election, 2017: Lucknow North
Party	Candidate	Votes	%	±%
BJP	Neeraj Bora	109,315	48.27	
SP	Abhishek Mishra	82,039	36.23	
BSP	Ajay Kumar Srivastava	29,955	13.23	
NOTA	None of the above	1,370	0.61	
Majority		27,276	12.04	
Turnout		226,447	56.15	
BJP gain from SP		Swing		

=== 2012 ===
U. P. Legislative Assembly Election, 2012: Lucknow North
Party	Candidate	Votes	%	±%
SP	Abhishek Mishra	47,580	28.11	
INC	Dr. Neeraj Bora	45,361	26.80	
BJP	Ashutosh Tandon (Gopal Ji)	45,245	26.73	
BSP	Arun Dwivedi	22,902	13.53	
PECP	Dinesh Kumar Srivastava	2,215	1.31	
Majority		2,219	1.31	
Turnout		1,69,867	50.25	
SP win (new seat)				
