= Lucknow Lok Sabha constituency =

Lok Sabha Constituency in Uttar Pradesh, India

Coordinates: 26.85°N 80.94°E

Lucknow UP-35
- Lok Sabha constituency
- Interactive Map Outlining Lucknow Lok Sabha constituency

Constituency details
- Country: India
- Region: North India
- State: Uttar Pradesh
- Assembly constituencies: Lucknow West; Lucknow North; Lucknow East; Lucknow Central; Lucknow Cantt
- Established: 1952
- Reservation: None

Member of Parliament
- 18th Lok Sabha
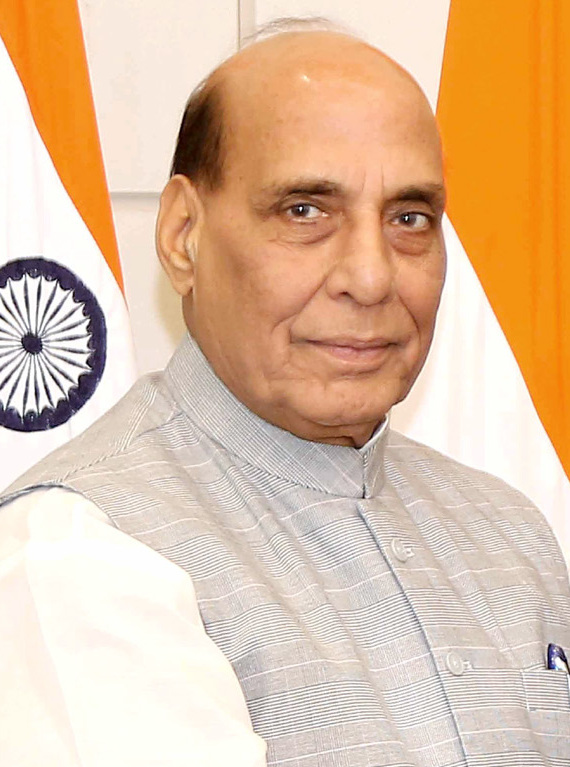
- Incumbent Rajnath Singh; Union Minister of Defence
- Party: BJP
- Alliance: NDA
- Elected year: 2024
- Preceded by: Lalji Tandon BJP

Lucknow Lok Sabha constituency is one of the 80 Lok Sabha (parliamentary) constituencies in Uttar Pradesh state in northern India. It is one of the two lok sabha constituencies that lies in the largest and capital city of the state, Lucknow.

Since 1991 the seat has been held by the BJP. Its best-known MP is former prime minister of India, Atal Bihari Vajpayee. Vajpayee contested from this seat eight times. First time, he contested 1955 bypoll and came third. Then he came second in 1957 and 1962. After these 3 losses, he won the seat five consecutive times, in 1991, 1996, 1998, 1999 and 2004.

== Assembly segments ==
No	Name	District	Member	Party	2024 Lead
171	Lucknow West	Lucknow	Armaan Khan	SP	SP
172	Lucknow North	Lucknow	Neeraj Bora	BJP	BJP
173	Lucknow East	Lucknow	O. P. Srivastava	BJP	BJP
174	Lucknow Central	Lucknow	Ravidas Mehrotra	SP	SP
175	Lucknow Cantt.	Lucknow	Brajesh Pathak	BJP	BJP

== Members of Parliament ==
Year	Member	Party
1952	Vijaya Lakshmi Pandit	Indian National Congress
1955^	Sheorajvati Nehru	Indian National Congress
1957	Pulin Behari Banerji	Indian National Congress
1962	B. K. Dhaon	Indian National Congress
1967	Anand Narain Mulla	Independent
1971	Sheila Kaul	Indian National Congress
1977	Hemwati Nandan Bahuguna	Janata Party
1980	Sheila Kaul	Indian National Congress
1984	Sheila Kaul	Indian National Congress
1989	Mandhata Singh	Janata Dal
1991	Atal Bihari Vajpayee	Bharatiya Janata Party
1996	Atal Bihari Vajpayee	Bharatiya Janata Party
1998	Atal Bihari Vajpayee	Bharatiya Janata Party
1999	Atal Bihari Vajpayee	Bharatiya Janata Party
2004	Atal Bihari Vajpayee	Bharatiya Janata Party
2009	Lalji Tandon	Bharatiya Janata Party
2014	Rajnath Singh	Bharatiya Janata Party
2019	Rajnath Singh	Bharatiya Janata Party
2024	Rajnath Singh	Bharatiya Janata Party

^ by-poll

1. BJP (9 terms) (47.4%)
2. INC (7 terms) (36.8%)
3. JD (1 terms) (5.26%)
4. JP (1 terms) (5.26%)
5. IND (1 terms) (5.26%)

== Election results ==
Vote share of winning candidates
2024	53.89%
2019	56.70%
2014	54.27%
2009	34.93%
2004	56.12%
1999	48.12%
1998	57.82%
1996	52.25%
1991	50.90%
1989	34.08%
1984	55.67%
1980	47.65%
1977	72.99%
1971	71.61%
1967	36.55%
1962	50.45%
1957	40.75%
1952	41.83%

=== 2024 results ===
2024 Indian general elections: Lucknow
Party	Candidate	Votes	%	±%
BJP	Rajnath Singh	612,709	53.89	▼2.81
SP	Ravidas Mehrotra	477,550	42.00	▲16.41
BSP	Mohd Sarwar Malik	30,192	2.66	▲2.66
NOTA	None of the Above	7,350	0.65	▼0.01
Majority		1,35,159	11.89	▼19.22
Turnout		11,36,892	52.34	▼2.38
BJP hold		Swing		

=== 2019 results ===
2019 Indian general elections: Lucknow
Party	Candidate	Votes	%	±%
BJP	Rajnath Singh	633,026	56.70	+2.43
SP	Poonam Sinha	2,85,724	25.59	+20.10
INC	Acharya Pramod Krishnam	1,80,011	16.12	0
NOTA	None of the Above	7,416	0.66	+0.21
Majority		3,47,302	31.11	+4.73
Turnout		11,16,445	54.72	+1.70
BJP hold		Swing	+2.43	

=== 2014 results ===
2014 Indian general elections: Lucknow
Party	Candidate	Votes	%	±%
BJP	Rajnath Singh	561,106	54.27	+19.34
INC	Rita Bahuguna Joshi	2,88,357	27.89	−0.04
BSP	Nakul Dubey	64,449	6.23	−16.65
SP	Abhishek Mishra	56,771	5.49	−5.03
AAP	Syed Jaaved Ahmed Jaaferi	41,429	4.01	N/A
NOTA	None of the Above	4,696	0.45	+0.45
Majority		2,72,749	26.38	+19.38
Turnout		10,33,883	53.02	+17.69
BJP hold		Swing	+19.34	

=== 2009 results ===
2009 Indian general elections: Lucknow
Party	Candidate	Votes	%	±%
BJP	Lal Ji Tandon	204,028	34.93	−21.19
INC	Rita Bahuguna Joshi	1,63,127	27.93	+27.93
BSP	Dr. Akhilesh Das Gupta	1,33,610	22.88	+13.62
SP	Nafisa Ali Sodhi	61,457	10.52	−7.86
AITC	Rajesh Kumar Pandey	19,607	4.9	+1.25
Majority		40,901	7.00	−49.18
Turnout		6,14,058	37.49	
BJP hold		Swing		

=== 2004 results ===
2004 Indian general elections: Lucknow
Party	Candidate	Votes	%	±%
BJP	Atal Bihari Vajpayee	324,714	56.12	+8.01
SP	Dr. Madhu Gupta	1,06,339	18.38	+7.92
Independent	Ram Boolchand Jethmalani	57,685	9.97	N/A
BSP	Nasir Ali Siddiqui	53,566	9.26	−7.86
Majority		2,18,375	37.74	+21.34
Turnout		5,78,556	35.28	−13.29
BJP hold		Swing		

=== 1999 results ===
1999 Indian general election: Lucknow
Party	Candidate	Votes	%	±%
BJP	Atal Bihari Vajpayee	362,709	48.11	
INC	Dr. Karan Singh	2,39,085	31.71	
SP	Bhagwati Singh	78,826	10.46	
BSP	Ijaharul Haque	43,948	5.83	
Independent	Dr. Vijay Agarwal	8,527	1.13	
Majority		1,23,624	16.40	
Turnout		7,53,943	48.57	
BJP hold		Swing		

=== 1998 results ===
1998 Indian general election: Lucknow
Party	Candidate	Votes	%	±%
BJP	Atal Bihari Vajpayee	431,738	57.82	
SP	Muzaffar Ali	2,15,475	28.86	
BSP	Dr. Dau Ji Gupta	56,887	7.62	
INC	Ranjeet Singh	38,636	5.17	
Independent	Kumari Katori Devi	1,099	0.15	
Majority		2,16,263	28.96	
Turnout		7,46,669	49.35	
BJP hold		Swing		

=== 1996 results ===
1996 Indian general election: Lucknow
Party	Candidate	Votes	%	±%
BJP	Atal Bihari Vajpayee	394,865	52.25	
SP	Raj Babbar	2,76,194	36.55	
BSP	Ved Prakash Grover	42,993	5.69	
INC	Om Pathak	19,042	2.42	
Independent	Ramdev	3,639	0.48	
Majority		1,18,671	15.70	
Turnout		7,55,746	50.78	
BJP hold		Swing		

=== 1991 results ===
1991 Indian general election: Lucknow
Party	Candidate	Votes	%	±%
BJP	Atal Bihari Vajpayee	194,886	50.90	
INC	Ranjeet Singh	77,583	20.26	
JP	Heeru Saxena	59,385	15.51	
JD	Mandhata Singh	22,357	5.84	
BSP	Balbir Singh Saluja	13,728	3.59	
Majority		1,17,303	30.64	
Turnout		3,82,877	32.23	
BJP gain from JD		Swing	16.82	

=== 1989 results ===
1989 Indian general election: Lucknow
Party	Candidate	Votes	%	±%
JD	Mandhata Singh	110,433	34.08	
INC	Dau Ji	95,137	29.36	
Independent	Balraj Madhok	73,839	22.78	
BSP	Jagmohan Singh Verma	20,393	6.29	
Majority		15,614	4.72	
Turnout		3,24,073	28.65	
JD gain from INC		Swing		

=== 1984 results ===
1984 Indian general election: Lucknow
Party	Candidate	Votes	%	±%
INC	Sheila Kaul	169,260	55.67	
LKD	Mohammad Yunus Saleem	47,140	15.50	
BJP	Lal Ji Tandon	36,973	12.16	
JP	D. P. Bora	15,783	6.29	
Majority		1,22,120	40.17	
Turnout		3,04,058	40.30	
INC hold		Swing		

=== 1980 results ===
1980 Indian general election: Lucknow
Party	Candidate	Votes	%	±%
INC(I)	Sheila Kaul	123,231	47.65	
JP	Mahmood Butt	92,849	35.90	
INC(U)	Triloki Singh	17,163	6.64	
Majority		30,382	11.75	
Turnout		2,58,620	37.63	
INC(I) gain from JP		Swing		

=== 1977 results ===
1977 Indian general election: Lucknow
Party	Candidate	Votes	%	±%
JP	Hemwati Nandan Bahuguna	242,362	72.99	
INC	Sheila Kaul	77,017	23.19	
Independent	Sarju Prasad	5,534	1.67	
Majority		1,65,345	49.80	
Turnout		3,32,049	53.52	
JP gain from INC		Swing		

=== 1971 results ===
1971 Indian general election: Lucknow
Party	Candidate	Votes	%	±%
INC	Sheila Kaul	1,71,019	71.61	
ABJS	Purushottam Das Kapoor	51,818	21.70	
BKD	D. P. Bora	12,039	5.04	
Majority		1,19,201	49.91	
Turnout		2,38,808	46.49	
INC gain from Independent		Swing		

=== 1967 results ===
1967 Indian general election: Lucknow
Party	Candidate	Votes	%	±%
Independent	Anand Narain Mulla	92,535	36.55	
INC	V. R. Mohan	71,563	28.27	
ABJS	R. C. Sharma	60,291	23.81	
Majority		20,972	8.28	
Turnout		2,53,175	27.63	
Independent gain from INC		Swing		

=== 1962 results ===
1962 Indian general election: Lucknow
Party	Candidate	Votes	%	±%
INC	B. K. Dhaon	1,16,637	50.45	
ABJS	Atal Bihari Vajpayee	86,620	37.47	
Independent	Jagdish Gandhi	14,774	6.39	
Socialist	M. A. Haleem	6,928	3.00	
ABHM	Radhey Shyam	4,356	1.88	
Majority		30,017	12.98	
Turnout		2,38,485	58.49	
INC hold		Swing		

=== 1957 results ===
1957 Indian general election: Lucknow
Party	Candidate	Votes	%	±%
INC	Pulin Behari Banerji	69,519	40.75	
ABJS	Atal Bihari Vajpayee	57,034	33.44	
CPI	Fazal Abbas Kazmi	28,542	16.73	
Majority		12,485	7.31	
Turnout		1,70,579	45.12	
INC hold		Swing		

=== 1955 bypoll results ===
By Election, 1955: Lucknow Central
Party	Candidate	Votes	%	±%
INC	Sheorajvati Nehru	49,324	41.83	
PSP	Tirloki Singh	34,578	29.33	
ABJS	Atal Bihari Vajpayee	33,986	28.82	
Majority		14,746	12.50	
Turnout		1,17,888	33.35	
INC hold		Swing		

=== 1951-52 results ===
General Election, 1951: Lucknow Central
Party	Candidate	Votes	%	±%
INC	Vijaya Lakshmi Pandit	1,02,764	69.17	
ABJS	Har Govind Dayal	35,112	23.63	
ABRRP	Gaya Prasad Shukla	6,021	4.05	
Independent	Nathu Ram	4,672	3.14	
Majority		67,652	45.54	
Turnout		1,48,569	42.03	
INC win (new seat)				

== See also ==
- Lucknow district
- List of constituencies of the Lok Sabha
- Lucknow (Mayoral Constituency)
- Lucknow (Division Graduates Constituency)
- Lucknow Rural Lok Sabha constituency

Lok Sabha
Preceded by Gandhinagar	Constituency represented by the leader of the opposition 1993 – 1996	Succeeded by Berhampur
Preceded by Nandyal	Constituency represented by the prime minister 1996	Vacant until 1998 (Prime Minister in Rajya Sabha) Title next held by Lucknow
Preceded by Berhampur	Constituency represented by the leader of the opposition 1996 – 1997	Succeeded by Baramati
Vacant since 1996 (Prime Minister in Rajya Sabha) Title last held by Lucknow	Constituency represented by the prime minister 1998-2004	Vacant until 2014 (Prime Minister in Rajya Sabha) Title next held by Varanasi
