= Manu Bhagavan =

American historian (born 1970)

Manu Belur Bhagavan
- Born: January 1, 1970 (age 56)
- Occupations: Historian, professor
- Known for: 20th-century India, human rights, intellectual history
- Title: Professor of History and Human Rights
- Awards: ACLS Fellowship (2006); Member of the Pacific Council on International Policy (2017)

Academic background
- Education: Carleton College (BA); University of Texas at Austin (PhD)

Academic work
- Discipline: History
- Sub-discipline: Intellectual history, Constitutional history
- Institutions: Hunter College; Graduate Center, CUNY; Ralph Bunche Institute
- Main interests: Modern South Asia, United Nations, International relations

Manu Belur Bhagavan (born 1970) is an Indian American historian and professor of history and human rights at Hunter College and the Graduate Center of the City University of New York. He is also a senior fellow at the Ralph Bunche Institute. Bhagavan's research focuses on 20th-century India, intellectual history, human rights, and constitutional history.

== Early life and education ==
Manu Belur Bhagavan was born in 1970. He received his B.A from Carleton College and Ph.D. from the University of Texas at Austin.

== Career ==
Bhagavan is a professor of history and human rights at Hunter College and the Graduate Center of the City University of New York. His teaching interests include modern South Asian history, human rights, and intellectual history. He has authored several books, including The Peacemakers: India and the Quest for One World (2012) and Sovereign Spheres: Princes, Education, and Empire in Colonial India (2003).

Bhagavan has also edited or co-edited multiple volumes, including India and the Cold War (2019) and Hidden Histories: Religion and Reform in South Asia (2018). Bhagavan's essays and op-eds have appeared in various publications. His 2016 Quartz essay on global authoritarianism gained international attention and was translated into German for the Berliner Republik magazine.

In 2006, Bhagavan received a fellowship from the American Council of Learned Societies. He was elected as a member of the Pacific Council on International Policy in 2017. In 2023, Bhagavan wrote a biography of Vijaya Lakshmi Pandit.

Bhagavan held the position of president at the Society for Advancing the History of South Asia, and chaired the Human Rights Program at the Roosevelt House Public Policy Institute. He frequently provides commentary in the media on topics concerning India, international relations, the United Nations, and human rights.

== Selected publications ==
- Sovereign Spheres: Princes, Education, and Empire in Colonial India. New Delhi: Oxford University Press. 2003. ISBN 978-0-19-566399-0.
- India and the Quest for One World: The Peacemakers. Basingstoke: Palgrave Macmillan. 2013. ISBN 978-1-137-34983-5.
- India and the Cold War. Chapel Hill: University of North Carolina Press. 2019. ISBN 978-1-4696-5117-0.
- Vijaya Lakshmi Pandit: A Biography. Gurugram: Penguin Random House India. 2023. ISBN 978-06-7008-947-5.
