= Vijaya Lakshmi Pandit =

Indian freedom fighter, diplomat and politician (1900–1990)

Her Excellency Vijaya Lakshmi Pandit
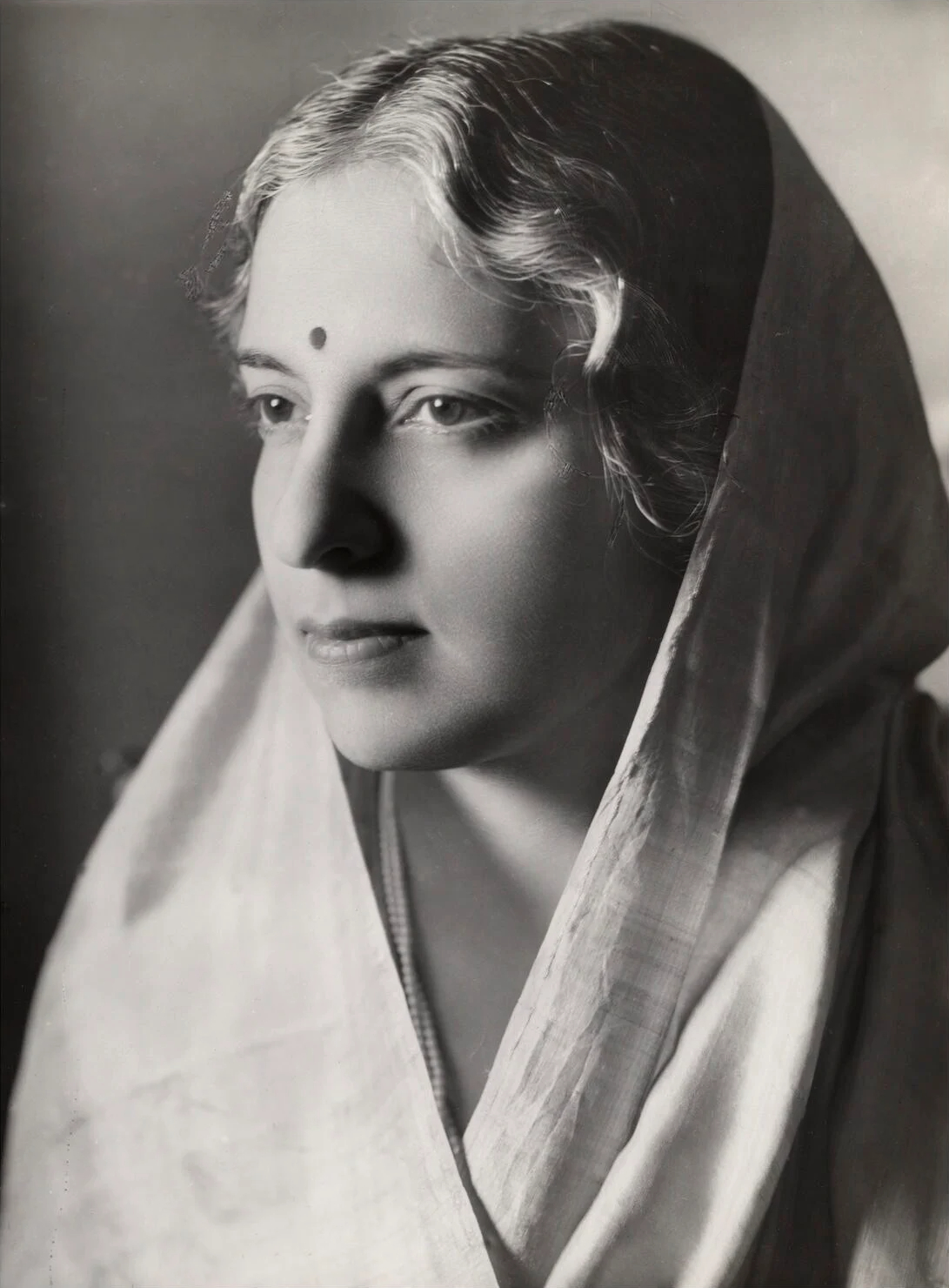
- Vijaya Lakshmi Pandit c. 1938

8th President of the United Nations General Assembly
- In office 15 September 1953 – 21 September 1954
- Preceded by: Lester B. Pearson
- Succeeded by: Eelco N. van Kleffens

3rd Governor of Maharashtra
- In office 28 November 1962 – 18 October 1964
- Chief Minister: Marotrao Kannamwar (Note: P. K. Sawant (interim)); Vasantrao Naik
- Preceded by: P. Subbarayan
- Succeeded by: P. V. Cherian

Member of Parliament, Lok Sabha
- In office 1964–1969
- Preceded by: Jawaharlal Nehru
- Succeeded by: Janeshwar Mishra
- Constituency: Phulpur
- In office 1952–1955
- Preceded by: constituency established
- Succeeded by: Sheorajvati Nehru
- Constituency: Lucknow

Personal details
- Born: Swarup Nehru; 18 August 1900 Prayagraj, British Raj
- Died: 1 December 1990 (aged 90) Dehradun, Uttar Pradesh, India (present-day Uttarakhand)
- Party: Indian National Congress
- Spouse: Ranjit Sitaram Pandit (m. 1921; died 1944)
- Children: 3, including Nayantara Sahgal
- Parent(s): Motilal Nehru; Swarup Rani Nehru
- Relatives: See Nehru–Gandhi family

Vijaya Lakshmi Pandit (née Swarup Nehru; 18 August 1900 – 1 December 1990) was an Indian freedom fighter, diplomat and politician. She served as the 8th President of the United Nations General Assembly from 1953 to 1954, the first woman and the only Indian to have been appointed to this post. She was also the 3rd Governor of Maharashtra from 1962 to 1964. Noted for her participation in the Indian independence movement, she was jailed several times during the movement.

In 1944, she visited the United States to raise awareness about the Indian affairs among the American people in order to counter the anti-Indian propaganda there. Following the independence of India, she was sent to London as India's most important diplomat after serving as India's envoy to the Soviet Union, the United States and the United Nations. Hailing from the prominent Nehru-Gandhi political family, her brother Jawaharlal Nehru was the first prime minister of independent India.

== Early life ==
Vijaya Lakshmi's (born Swarup) father, Motilal Nehru (1861–1931), a wealthy barrister who belonged to the Kashmiri Pandit community, served twice as President of the Indian National Congress during the Independence Struggle. Her mother, Swaruprani Thussu (1868–1938), who came from a well-known Kashmiri Pandit family settled in Lahore, was Motilal's second wife, the first having died in child birth. She was the second of three children; Jawaharlal was eleven years her senior (b. 1889), while her younger sister Krishna Hutheesing (1907–1967) became a noted writer and authored several books on their brother.

== Career ==
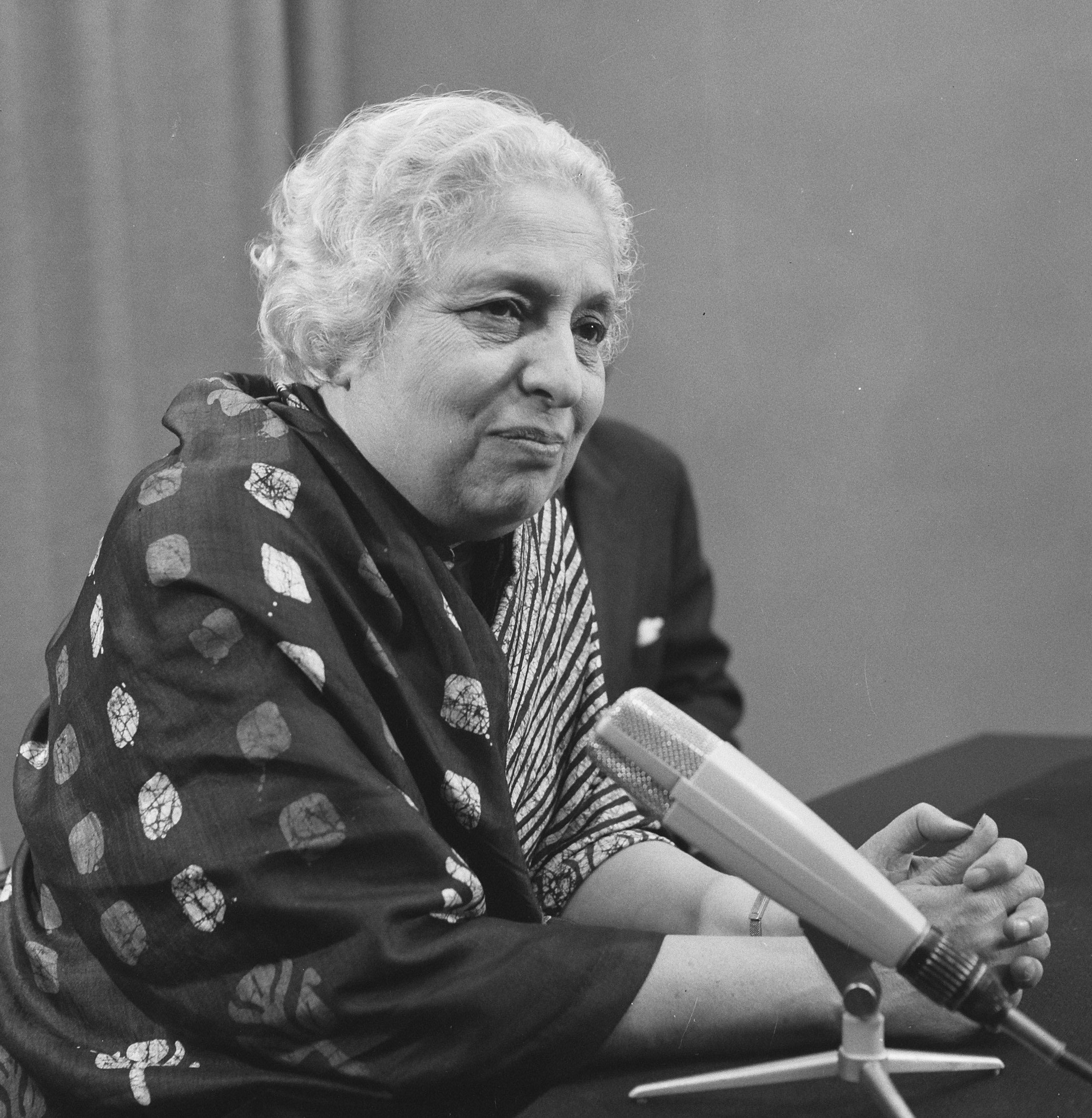
Pandit in the Netherlands, 1965

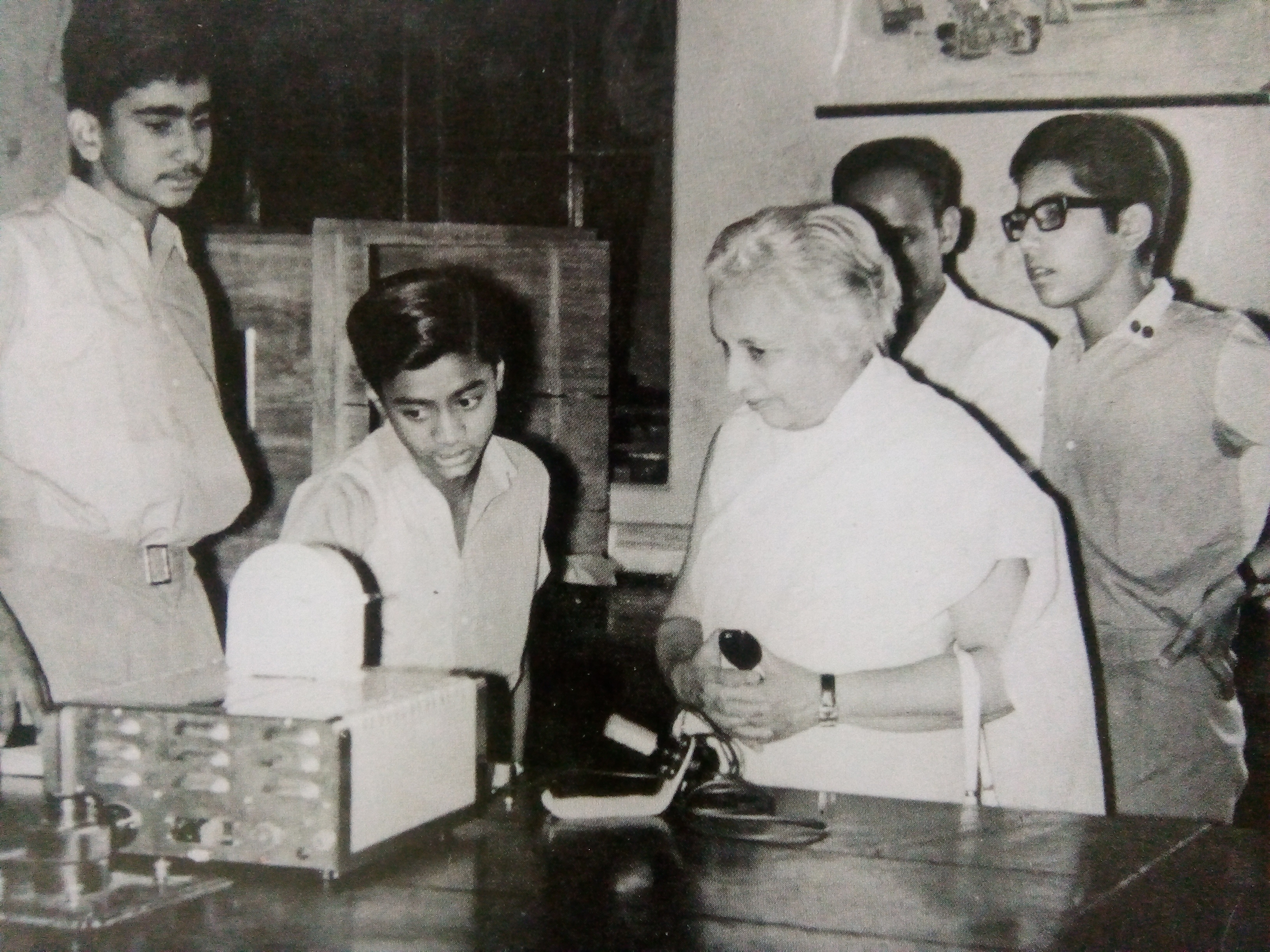
Pandit as a Chief Guest at The Doon School, Dehradun, in the 1960s.

She attended the 1916 Congress session that took place in Lucknow. She was impressed by Sarojini Naidu and Annie Besant.

In 1920, she spent time in Mahatma Gandhi's ashram close to Ahmedabad. She participated in daily chores including dairy work and spinning. She also worked in the office that used to publish Young India.

Pandit was the first Indian woman to hold a cabinet post in pre-independent India. In 1936, she stood in general elections and became a member of parliament by 1937 for the constituency of Cawnpore Bilhaur. In 1937, she was elected to the provincial legislature of the United Provinces and was designated minister of local self-government and public health. She held the latter post until 1938 and again from 1946 to 1947.

She spent significant time in jail for her participation in the Indian independence movement. She was jailed for 18 months from 1931 to 1933. She was jailed again for 6 months in 1940 before getting jailed in 1942 for 7 months over her participation in the Quit India Movement. After her release, she helped the victims of the Bengal famine of 1943 and served as president of the Save the Children Fund Committee which rescued poor children from the streets.

Following the death of her husband in 1944, she experienced Indian inheritance laws for Hindu widows and campaigned with All India Women's Conference to bring changes to these laws.

In 1944, she visited the United States to raise awareness about the Indian affairs among the American people in order to counter the anti-Indian propaganda there.

In 1946, she was elected to the Constituent Assembly from the United Provinces.

Following India's independence from British rule in 1947 she entered the diplomatic service and became India's ambassador to the Soviet Union from 1947 to 1949, the United States and Mexico from 1949 to 1951, Ireland from 1955 to 1961 (during which time she was also the Indian High Commissioner to the United Kingdom), and Spain from 1956 to 1961. Between 1946 and 1968, she headed the Indian delegation to the United Nations. In 1953, she became the first woman President of the United Nations General Assembly (she was inducted as an honorary member of the Alpha Kappa Alpha sorority in 1978 for this accomplishment). That same year she was a candidate for Secretary General of the United Nations.

Hon. Members Shrimati Vijaya Lakshmi Pandit has resigned her seat in the House with effect from 17 December 1954.

In India, she served as Governor of Maharashtra from 1962 to 1964. She returned as a member of parliament for 1964 to 1968 with her election victory in Phulpur. Pandit was the paternal aunt of Indira Gandhi and became a harsh critic of Gandhi’s years as prime minister especially after she had declared the emergency in 1975.

Pandit retired from active politics after relations between them soured. On retiring, she moved to Dehradun in the Doon Valley in the Himalayan foothills. She came out of retirement in 1977 to campaign against Indira Gandhi and helped the Janata Party win the 1977 election. She was reported to have considered running for the presidency, but Neelam Sanjiva Reddy eventually ran and won the election unopposed.

In 1979, she was appointed the Indian representative to the UN Human Rights Commission, after which she retired from public life. Her writings include The Evolution of India (1958) and The Scope of Happiness: A Personal Memoir (1979).

== Personal life ==
As a teenager, Pandit entered into a short relationship with Syud Hossain, then editor of her father's newspaper, The Independent. Her family disapproved and, according to historian Stanley Wolpert, Pandit was sent to Gandhi's ashram to dampen her feelings. Historian Manu Bhagavan states that Pandit "definitely married Syud Hossain", though notes that the marriage may have been 'informal'.

In 1921, she married Ranjit Sitaram Pandit (1921–1944), a successful barrister from Kathiawar, Gujarat and classical scholar who translated Kalhana's epic history Rajatarangini into English from Sanskrit. Her husband was a Maharashtrian Saraswat Brahmin, whose family hailed from village of Bambuli, on the Ratnagiri coast, in Maharashtra. He was arrested for his support of Indian independence and died in Lucknow prison in 1944, leaving behind his wife and their three daughters Chandralekha Mehta, Nayantara Sehgal and Rita Dar.

She died in 1990. She was survived by her daughters, Chandralekha and Nayantara Sahgal.

== Academics ==
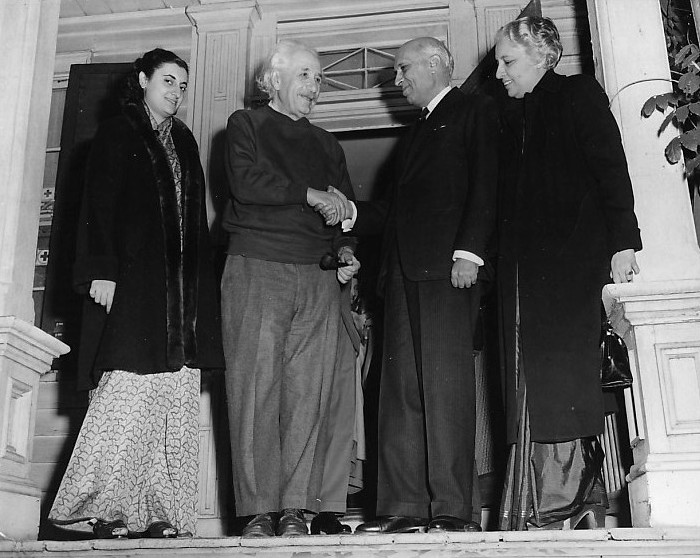
Vijaya Lakshmi Pandit along with Indira Gandhi and Nehru visit Albert Einstein

She was the member of Aligarh Muslim University Executive Council.

She was an Honorary Fellow of Somerville College, Oxford, where her niece studied Modern History. A portrait of her by Edward Halliday hangs in the Somerville College Library.

== See also ==
- List of political families
- History of Indian foreign relations

Diplomatic posts
Preceded by Asaf Ali	Indian Ambassador to the United States; 1949–1952	Succeeded by Gaganvihari Lallubhai Mehta
Preceded by Lester B. Pearson	President of the United Nations General Assembly; 1953	Succeeded by Eelco N. van Kleffens
Preceded by none	Ambassador of India to the Soviet Union; 1947–1949	Succeeded by Sarvepalli Radhakrishnan
Preceded by B. G. Kher	High Commission of India to the United Kingdom; 1954–1961	Succeeded by M. C. Chagla
Political offices
Preceded by P. Subbarayan	Governor of Maharashtra; 1962–1964	Succeeded by P. V. Cherian
