= Neeraj Bora =

Indian politician

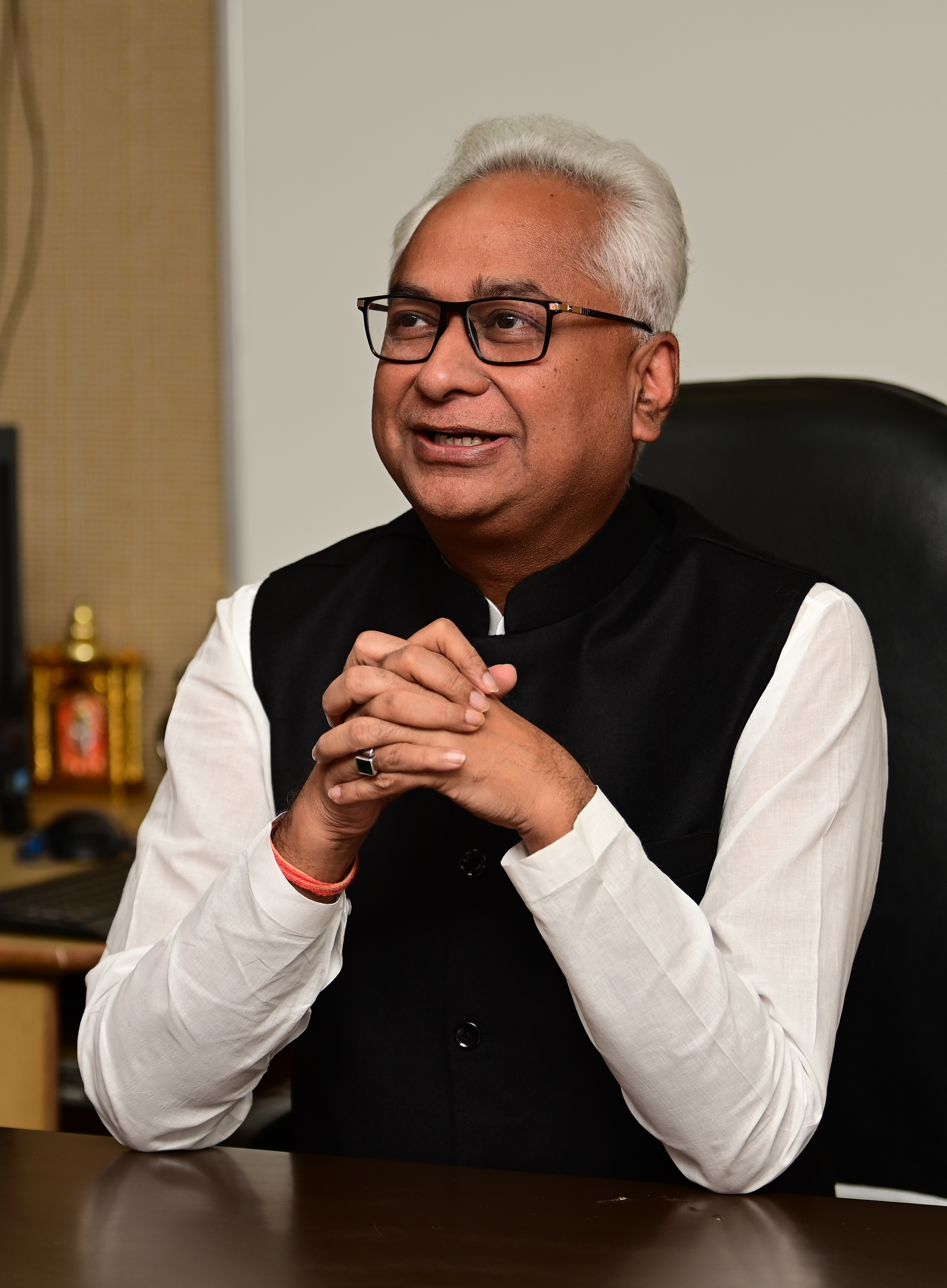

Member of the Uttar Pradesh legislative assembly
- Incumbent
- Assumed office 11 March 2017
- Preceded by: Abhishek Mishra
- Constituency: Lucknow North

Personal details
- Born: 31 March 1967 (age 59) Shohratgarh, Uttar Pradesh, India
- Party: Bharatiya Janata Party Indian National Congress (TILL 2017)
- Spouse: Bindu Bora
- Children: 3
- Education: MBBS, MBA, PhD
- Website: drneerajbora.in

Neeraj Bora is an Indian politician, doctor, and social worker, currently serving as a Member of the Uttar Pradesh Legislative Assembly representing the Lucknow North constituency. He is a member of the Bharatiya Janata Party and has been elected to the legislative assembly in the 2017 Uttar Pradesh Legislative Assembly election as well as the 2022 Uttar Pradesh Legislative Assembly election. He is also the founder of Sewa Hospital and Research Centre and the Bora Group of Institutions, including the Bora Institute of Allied Health Sciences.

== Early life and education ==
Born in Shohratgarh, Uttar Pradesh, Neeraj Bora's father was the late D. P. Bora, who was the President of the Lucknow University Students' Union in 1967 and as a Member of the Uttar Pradesh Legislative Assembly for two terms in 1969 and 1977.

Bora pursued a career in medicine, earning his MBBS degree from Dr. B. R. Ambedkar Medical College, Bengaluru, followed by an MBA from Institute of Advance Studies Education University.

== Political career ==
Bora started his political career in the Bahujan Samaj Party and contested the 2007 Uttar Pradesh Legislative Assembly election from the Lucknow West constituency but narrowly lost. He then later became the Chairman of the UP Bridge Corporation Limited in 2007. In 2009 Bora said that he had quit the party due to differences over the style of functioning within the party, while the party said that Bora had been expelled for what the party called "anti-party activities".

He contested the Mayoral elections for the Lucknow Municipal Corporation as the INC candidate but lost to Dinesh Sharma BJP. He became the INC party president for Lucknow but resigned in 2014 citing differences with the party over politics.

He joined the Bharatiya Janata Party in 2014, and was made the candidate for Lucknow North Assembly constituency in 2017, which he won in the 2017 Uttar Pradesh Legislative Assembly election. He won the seat again in the 2022 Assembly election. He currently serves as a Whip as well as the Treasurer of the Uttar Pradesh Legislative Assembly. Additionally, he serves as a member of the Public Undertakings and Corporations Joint Committee of the Uttar Pradesh Legislative Assembly, and is a government-nominated member of the board of Sanjay Gandhi Postgraduate Institute of Medical Sciences (SGPGI) in Lucknow. He is also a member of the State Advisory Board of the Department of Empowerment of Persons with Disabilities, Uttar Pradesh.

In September 2021 Bora said that during his tenure there was the construction of a 100-bed hospital, three new powerhouses, over 1,000 paved streets, and the rejuvenation of the Sitapur Road Market. He said that educational advancements include a new Industrial Training Institute (ITI), an auditorium at the Institute of Engineering and Technology (IET), and additional blocks in government and engineering colleges; the Badi Kaliji Temple and Shri Hanuman Temple were beautified, and civic amenities were enhanced. Bora also said that during the COVID-19 pandemic in India, welfare schemes facilitated the approval of regional development projects, including housing initiatives for underprivileged residents.

== Personal life ==
Neeraj Bora is married to Bindu Bora, and the couple have one son and two daughters.
