= Electoral history of Narendra Modi =

Elections featuring Prime Minister of India

This is a summary of the electoral history of Narendra Modi, who is the incumbent Prime Minister of India since 2014 and served as the Chief Minister of Gujarat from 2001 to 2014. He currently represents Varanasi as a Member of Parliament in Lok Sabha, the lower house of the Indian parliament.

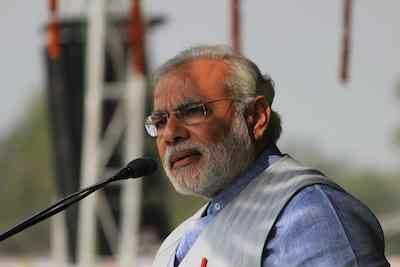
Modi addressing a rally in Bihar, prior to 2014 Indian general election

He contested his first election in February 2002 by-election to the Gujarat Legislative Assembly from the Rajkot II constituency. Later that year in 2002 elections he contested from Maninagar and won. He was re-elected from Maninagar in 2007 and 2012 and represented the constituency till 2014 when he became the Prime Minister of India.

In 2014, Modi contested for the two Lok Sabha constituencies: Varanasi and Vadodara. He won in both constituencies, defeating Aam Aadmi Party leader Arvind Kejriwal in Varanasi and Madhusudan Mistry of the Indian National Congress in Vadodara. To comply with the law that an elected representative cannot represent more than one constituency, he vacated the Vadodara seat. In 2019 he was again re-elected from Varanasi. In 2024 he was again re-elected from Varanasi for the third consecutive term.

== Summary ==
Election	House	Constituency	Result	Party
2002 (Note: By-election)	Gujarat Legislative Assembly	Rajkot II	Won	BJP
2002	Gujarat Legislative Assembly	Maninagar	Won	BJP
2007	Gujarat Legislative Assembly	Maninagar	Won	BJP
2012	Gujarat Legislative Assembly	Maninagar	Won	BJP
2014	Lok Sabha	Vadodara (Note: Vacated)	Won	BJP
2014	Lok Sabha	Varanasi	Won	BJP
2019	Lok Sabha	Varanasi	Won	BJP
2024	Lok Sabha	Varanasi	Won	BJP

== Lok Sabha elections ==
=== General election 2024 ===
2024 Indian general elections: Varanasi
Party	Candidate	Votes	%	±%
BJP	Narendra Modi	612,970	54.24	−9.38
INC	Ajay Rai	460,457	40.74	+26.36
BSP	Athar Jamal Lari	33,766	2.99	New
Yuga Thulasi Party	Kolisetty Shiva Kumar	5,750	0.51	
AD(K)	Gagan Prakash Yadav	3,634	0.32	
Independent	Dinesh Kumar Yadav	2,917	0.25	
Independent	Sanjay Kumar Tiwari	2,171	0.19	
NOTA	None of the Above	8,478	0.75	
Majority		152,513	13.50	−31.72
Turnout		1,130,143	56.57	−0.56
Registered electors		1,997,578		
BJP hold		Swing	-17.87	

=== General election 2019 ===
2019 Indian general election: Varanasi
Party	Candidate	Votes	%	±%
BJP	Narendra Modi	674,664	63.62	+7.25
SP	Shalini Yadav	195,159	18.40	+14.11
INC	Ajay Rai	152,548	14.38	+7.04
SBSP	Surendra Rajbhar	8,892	0.84	New
Janhit Kisan Party	Anil Kumar Chaurasiya	2,758	0.26	New
NOTA	None of the Above	4,037	0.38	+0.18
Majority		479,505	45.22	+9.15
Turnout		1,060,829	57.13	−1.22
BJP hold		Swing	+7.25	

=== General election 2014 ===
2014 Indian general election: Varanasi
Party	Candidate	Votes	%	±%
BJP	Narendra Modi	581,022	56.37	+25.85
AAP	Arvind Kejriwal	209,238	20.30	New
INC	Ajay Rai	75,614	7.34	−2.64
BSP	Vijay Prakash Jaiswal	60,579	5.88	−22.06
SP	Kailash Chaurasiya	45,291	4.39	−14.22
NOTA	None of the Above	2,051	0.20	New
Majority		371,784	36.07	+33.49
Turnout		1,030,812	58.35	+15.74
BJP hold		Swing	+25.85	

2014 Indian general election: Vadodara
Party	Candidate	Votes	%	±%
BJP	Narendra Modi	8,45,464	72.75	+15.35
INC	Madhusudan Mistry	2,75,336	23.69	−15.48
AAP	Sunil Digambar Kulkarni	10,101	0.87	N/A
BSP	Rohit Madhusudan Mohanbhai	5,782	0.50	−0.32
SUCI(C)	Tapan Dasgupta	2,249	0.19	N/A
SP	Sahebkhan Asifkhan Pathan	2,101	0.18	N/A
JD(U)	Ambalal Kanabhai Jadav	1,382	0.12	N/A
Apna Desh Party	Mahemudkhan Razakkhan Pathan	1,109	0.10	N/A
NOTA	None of the Above	18,053	1.55	N/A
Majority		5,70,128	49.06	+30.85
Turnout		11,62,168	70.94	+21.82
Registered electors		15,90,810		
BJP hold		Swing	+15.42	

== Gujarat Legislative Assembly elections ==
=== 2012 ===
2012 Gujarat Legislative Assembly election: Maninagar
Party	Candidate	Votes	%	±%
BJP	Narendra Modi	1,20,470	75.38	+5.85
INC	Shweta Sanjiv Bhatt	34,097	21.34	−4.77
Independent	Pavanbhai Shravanbhai Makan	1,488	0.93	+0.93
BSP	Siddharth Yasvantray Kashyap	1,251	0.78	−1.19
CPI	Vinod Brahmbhatt	1,098	0.69	+0.69
Majority		86,373	54.04	+10.62
Turnout		1,59,807	70.07	+9.14
BJP hold		Swing	+5.85	

=== 2007 ===
2007 Gujarat Legislative Assembly election: Maninagar
Party	Candidate	Votes	%	±%
BJP	Narendra Modi	1,39,568	69.53	−3.76
INC	Dinsha Patel	52,407	26.11	+1.43
BSP	Renu Varunkumar Kavatra	3,955	1.97	+1.97
Independent	Bhimjibhai Devabhai Prajapati	1,731	0.86	+0.86
CPI(ML)L	Amitkumar Lakshmanbhai Patanvadiya	1,045	0.52	+0.52
Majority		87,161	43.42	−5.19
Turnout		2,00,725	60.93	+10.74
BJP hold		Swing	-3.76	

=== December 2002 ===
2002 Gujarat Legislative Assembly election: Maninagar
Party	Candidate	Votes	%	±%
BJP	Narendra Modi	1,13,589	73.29	+12.15
INC	Yatinbhai Oza	38,256	24.68	−7.57
Independent	Harishbhai Ramchandra Sharma	1,946	1.26	+1.26
SP	Satubha Kanubha Vaghela	1,190	0.77	−0.65
Majority		75,333	48.61	+19.72
Turnout		1,54,981	50.19	+8.62
BJP hold		Swing	+12.15	

=== February 2002 ===
2002 Gujarat Legislative Assembly by-election: Rajkot II
Party	Candidate	Votes	%	±%
BJP	Narendra Modi	45298	57.32	
INC	Ashwinbhai Narbheshankar Mehta	30570	38.68	
Independent	Bharatbhai Bhikhalal Makwana	748	0.95	
Turnout		79028		
BJP hold		Swing		

== See also ==
- Electoral history of the Bharatiya Janata Party
- Electoral history of Atal Bihari Vajpayee
- Electoral history of L. K. Advani
- Electoral history of Rajnath Singh
- Electoral history of Yogi Adityanath
