= Electoral history of the Communist Party of India =

CPI's election history

The Communist Party of India (abbreviated as CPI) is a political party in India. Since independence, CPI has participated in elections.

== 1946 provincial assembly elections ==
The CPI had presented 108 candidates in the 1946 Indian provincial elections, out of whom 8 were elected. The meagre result was related to the decision of the party not to support the Quit India movement of 1942. Seven out of the eight seats it won were reserved for labour representatives. All in all, the Communist Party obtained 2.5% of the popular vote. Albeit far from competing with the two main parties (Indian National Congress and All India Muslim League), the communists became the third force in terms of the popular vote. Amongst the communist candidates elected were Jyoti Basu (railways constituency in Bengal), Ratanlal Brahmin (Darjeeling) and Rupnarayan Ray (Dinajpur).

== General election results ==
=== Lok Sabha ===
Year	Legislature	Total Lok Sabha constituencies	Seats won / Seats Contested	Change in seats	Total Votes	Percentage of votes	Change in vote %	Reference
1951–52	1st Lok Sabha	489	16 / 49	New	3,487,401	3.29%	New	
1957	2nd Lok Sabha	494	27 / 110	▲11	10,754,075	8.92%	▲5.63%	
1962	3rd Lok Sabha	494	29 / 137	▲2	11,450,037	9.94%	▲1.02%	
1967	4th Lok Sabha	520	23 / 109	▼6	7,458,396	5.11%	▼4.83%	
1971	5th Lok Sabha	518	23 / 87	Steady	6,933,627	4.73%	▼0.38%	
1977	6th Lok Sabha	542	7 / 91	▼16	5,322,088	2.82%	▼1.91%	
1980	7th Lok Sabha	529(542*)	10 / 47	▲3	4,927,342	2.49%	▼0.33%	
1984	8th Lok Sabha	541	6 / 61	▼4	6,363,430	2.71%	▲0.22%	
1989	9th Lok Sabha	529	12 / 50	▲6	7,734,697	2.57%	▼0.14%	
1991	10th Lok Sabha	534	14 / 42	▲2	6,851,114	2.49%	▼0.08%	
1996	11th Lok Sabha	543	12 / 43	▼2	6,582,263	1.97%	▼0.52%	
1998	12th Lok Sabha	543	9 / 58	▼3	6,429,569	1.75%	▼0.22%	
1999	13th Lok Sabha	543	4 / 54	▼5	5,395,119	1.48%	▼0.27%	
2004	14th Lok Sabha	543	10 / 34	▲6	5,484,111	1.41%	▼0.07%	
2009	15th Lok Sabha	543	4 / 56	▼6	5,951,888	1.43%	▲0.02%	
2014	16th Lok Sabha	543	1 / 67	▼3	4,327,460	0.79%	▼0.64%	
2019	17th Lok Sabha	543	2 / 49	▲1	3,576,184	0.59%	▼0.20%	
2024	18th Lok Sabha	543	2 / 30	Steady	3,132,683	0.49%	▼0.10%	

All time-CPI Lok Sabha seat count

== State Legislative assembly results ==
Year	State	Total assembly seats	Seats won / Seats contested	Change in seats	Votes	Vote %	Change in vote %
2018	Chhattisgarh	90	0 / 7	Steady	48,255	0.34%	▼0.32%
2018	Rajasthan	200	0 / 16	Steady	42,820	0.12%	▼0.06%
2018	Tripura	60	0 / 1	▼1	19,352	0.82%	▼0.85%
2019	Andhra Pradesh	175	0 / 7	Steady	34,746	0.11%	—N/a
2019	Jharkhand	81	0 / 18	Steady	68,589	0.46%	▼0.43%
2019	Maharashtra	288	0 / 16	Steady	35,188	0.06%	▼0.07%
2019	Odisha	147	0 / 3	Steady	29,235	0.12%	▼0.39%
2020	Bihar	243	2 / 6	▲2	349,489	0.83%	▼0.57%
2021	Assam	126	0 / 1	Steady	27,290	0.84%	▼0.14%
2021	Kerala	140	17 / 23	▼2	1,579,235	7.58%	▼0.54%
2021	Puducherry	30	0 / 1	Steady	7,522	0.90%	▼0.2%
2021	Tamil Nadu	234	2 / 6	▲2	504,537	1.09%	▲0.3%
2021	West Bengal	294	0 / 10	▼1	118,655	0.20%	▼1.25%
2022	Uttar Pradesh	403	0 / 35	Steady	64,011	0.07%	▼0.09%
2022	Uttarakhand	70	0 / 4	Steady	2,325	0.04%	
2022	Manipur	60	0 / 2	Steady	1,032	0.06%	▼0.68%
2022	Himachal Pradesh	68	0 / 1	Steady	627	0.01%	▼0.03%
2022	Punjab	117	0 / 7	Steady	7,440	0.05%	
2022	Gujarat	182	0 / 3	Steady	2,688	0.01%	▼0.01%
2023	Telangana	119	1 / 1	▲1	80,336	0.34	▼0.07
2023	Chhattisgarh	90	0 / 3	Steady	6,594	0.39	▲0.5%
2024	Andhra Pradesh	175	0 / 8	Steady	12,832	0.04%	▼0.07%
2024	Jharkhand	81	0 / 11	Steady	36,057	0.20%	▼0.26%
2024	Haryana	90	0 / 11	Steady	1,342	0.02%	
2024	Maharashtra	288	0 / 2	Steady	12,911	0.02%	▼0.04%
2024	Odisha	147	0 / 4	Steady	19,935	0.08%	▼0.04%
2025	Bihar	243	0 / 9	▼2	372,458	0.74%	▼0.09%
2026	Assam	126	0 / 5	Steady			
2026	Kerala	140	8 / 24	▼9	1,434,524	6.64%	▼0.94%
2026	Puducherry	30	0 / 2	Steady			
2026	Tamil Nadu	234	2 / 5	Steady	326,488	0.66%	▼0.43%
2026	West Bengal	294	0 / 1	Steady	99,223	0.16%	▼0.04%

- N/A indicates Not Available
- indicates in government or in Coalition government

Results from the Election Commission of India website. Results do not deal with partitions of states, defections and by-elections during the mandate period.

== See also ==
- Electoral history of the Bharatiya Janata Party
- Electoral history of the Communist Party of India (Marxist)
- Electoral history of the Indian National Congress
