= Electoral history of the Communist Party of India (Marxist) =

CPM's electoral history

The Communist Party of India (Marxist) (abbr. CPI(M)) is a Marxist–Leninist political party in India. It has participated in elections since its formation in 1964.

== Lok Sabha ==
Year	Legislature	Party Secretary	Total constituencies	Seats won / contested	Change in seats	Total votes	Per. of votes	Change in vote %	Party Rank	Outcome	Ref.
1967	4th Lok Sabha	Puchalapalli Sundarayya	520	19 / 59	New	6,246,522	4.28 %	New	6th	Opposition	
1971	5th Lok Sabha	Puchalapalli Sundarayya	518	25 / 85	▲6	7,510,089	5.12 %	▲0.84%	▲2nd	Main Opposition	
1977	6th Lok Sabha	Puchalapalli Sundarayya	542	22 / 53	▼3	8,113,659	4.29 %	▼0.83%	▼3rd	Opposition	
1980	7th Lok Sabha	E. M. S. Namboodiripad	529(542*)	37 / 64	▲15	12,352,331	6.24 %	▲1.95%	3rd	Opposition	
1984	8th Lok Sabha	E. M. S. Namboodiripad	541	22 / 64	▼15	14,272,526	5.72 %	▼0.52%	3rd	Opposition	
1989	9th Lok Sabha	E. M. S. Namboodiripad	529	33 / 64	▲11	19,691,309	6.55 %	▲0.83	▼4th	Outside Support	
1991	10th Lok Sabha	E. M. S. Namboodiripad	534	35 / 63	▲2	17,074,699	6.14 %	▼0.41%	4th	Opposition	
1996	11th Lok Sabha	Harkishan Singh Surjeet	543	32 / 75	▼3	20,496,810	6.12 %	▼0.02%	4th	Outside Support	
1998	12th Lok Sabha	Harkishan Singh Surjeet	543	32 / 71	Steady	18,991,867	5.16 %	▼0.96%	▲3rd	Opposition	
1999	13th Lok Sabha	Harkishan Singh Surjeet	543	33 / 72	▲1	19,695,767	5.40 %	▲0.24%	3rd	Opposition	
2004	14th Lok Sabha	Harkishan Singh Surjeet	543	43 / 69	▲10	22,070,614	5.66 %	▲0.26%	3rd	Outside Support	
2009	15th Lok Sabha	Prakash Karat	543	16 / 82	▼27	22,219,111	5.33 %	▼0.33%	▼8th	Opposition	
2014	16th Lok Sabha	Prakash Karat	543	9 / 93	▼7	17,986,773	3.24 %	▼2.09%	▼9th	Opposition	
2019	17th Lok Sabha	Sitaram Yechury	543	3 / 69	▼6	10,744,908	1.75 %	▼1.49%	▼16th	Opposition	
2024	18th Lok Sabha	Sitaram Yechury	543	4 / 52	▲1	11,342,553	1.76%	▲0.01%	▲14th	Opposition	

All time-CPI(M) Lok Sabha seat count

== State Legislative Assemblies ==
Election Year	Overall votes	% of overall votes	Total seats	seats won/ seats contensted	+/- in seats	+/- in vote share	Sitting side
Andhra Pradesh Legislative Assembly
1985	5,30,349	2.69%	294	11 / 11	▲6	▲0.20	—N/a
1989	7,07,686	2.96%	294	6 / 15	▼5	▲0.15	—N/a
1994	9,23,204	2.96%	294	15 / 16	▲9	▲0.50	—N/a
1999	5,67,761	1.70%	294	2 / 48	▼14	▼1.26	—N/a
2004	6,56,721	1.84%	294	9 / 14	▲7	▲0.14	—N/a
2009	6,03,407	1.43%	294	1 / 18	▼8	▼0.49	—N/a
2014	4,07,376	0.84%	175	1 / 68	Steady	▼0.59	—N/a
2019	1,01,071	0.32%	175	0 / 7	▼1	Steady	—N/a
2024	43,012	0.13%	175	0 / 8	—	▼0.19%	—
Assam Legislative Assembly
2016	93,506	0.55%	126	0 / 19	Steady	Steady	—N/a
2021	160,758	0.84%	126	1 / 2	▲1	▲0.29	Opposition
2026	102,190	0.47%	126	0 / 2	▼1	▼0.37	—N/a
Bihar Legislative Assembly
2015	232,149	0.61%	243	0 / 43	Steady	▼0.21	—N/a
2020	274,155	0.65%	243	2 / 4	▲2	▲0.04%	Opposition
2025	302,974	0.61%	243	1 / 243	▼1	▼0.04	Opposition
Gujarat Legislative Assembly
2022	10,647	0.03%	182	0 / 9	Steady	▼0.01%	—N/a
Haryana Legislative Assembly
2024	34,373	0.25%	90	0 / 1	—	▲0.18%	—
Himachal Pradesh Legislative Assembly
2017	55,558	1.5%	68	1 / 14	▲1	▼0.1%	—N/a
2022	27,812	0.66%	68	0 / 11	▼1	▼0.81%	Steady
Jammu and Kashmir Legislative Assembly
2014	24,017	0.5%	87	1 / 3	—	▼0.3%	Opposition
2024	33,634	0.6%	90	1 / 1	-	▲0.1%	Government
Kerala Legislative Assembly
1965	1,257,869	19.87%	140	40 / 73	New	New	—N/a
1967	1,476,456	23.51%	140	52 / 59	▲12	▲3.64	Government
1970	1,794,213	23.83%	140	29 / 73	▼23	▲0.32	Opposition
1977	1,946,051	22.18%	140	17 / 68	▼12	▼1.65	Opposition
1980	1,846,312	19.35%	140	35 / 50	▲18	▼2.83	Government
1982	1,798,198	18.80%	140	26 / 51	▼9	▼0.55	Opposition
1987	2,912,999	22.86%	140	38 / 70	▲12	▲4.06	Government
1991	3,082,354	21.74%	140	28 / 64	▼10	▼2.12	Opposition
1996	3,078,723	21.59%	140	40 / 62	▲12	▲0.15	Government
2001	3,752,976	23.85%	140	24 / 74	▼16	▲2.26	Opposition
2006	4,732,381	30.45%	140	61 / 84	▲37	▲6.60	Government
2011	4,921,354	28.18%	140	45 / 84	▼16	▼2.27	Opposition
2016	5,365,472	26.7%	140	59 / 84	▲14	▼1.48	Government
2021	5,288,502	25.38%	140	62 / 77	▲4	▼1.14%	Government
2026	4,700,662	21.77%	140	26 / 77	▼36	▼3.61%	Opposition
Maharashtra Legislative Assembly
2009	270,052	0.60%	288	1 / 20	▼2	▼0.02%	—N/a
2014	207,933	0.39%	288	1 / 20	Steady	▼0.21%	—N/a
2019	204,933	0.37%	288	1 / 8	Steady	▼0.02%	Opposition
2024	222,277	0.36%	288	1 / 3	Steady	▼0.01%	Opposition
Odisha Legislative Assembly
2014	80,274	0.40%	147	1 / 8	Steady	—N/a	—N/a
2019	70,119	0.32%	147	1 / 8	Steady	—N/a	—N/a
2024	93,295	0.37%	147	1 / 7	—	▲0.07%	—
Punjab Legislative Assembly
2022	9,503	0.06%	117	0 / 14	—N/a	—N/a	—N/a
Rajasthan Legislative Assembly
2013	629,002	0.9%	200	0 / 38	▼3	▼0.7	—N/a
2018	434,210	1.2%	200	2 / 28	▲2	▲0.33	—N/a
2023	382,387	0.96%	200	0 / 17	▼2	▼0.24	—N/a
Tamil Nadu Legislative Assembly
2006	8,72,674	2.70%	234	9 / 13	▼10	▲0.33	Government
2011	8,88,364	2.40%	234	10 / 12	▲1	▼0.3	Government
2016	3,07,303	0.72%	234	0 / 25	▼10	▼1.58	—N/a
2021	3,90,819	0.85%	234	2 / 6	▲2	▲0.13	Government
2026	293,817	0.60%	234	2 / 5	Steady	▼0.25	Outside Support
Telangana Legislative Assembly
2018	91,099	0.40%	119	2 / 28	▼1	—N/a	—N/a
2023	52,364	0.22%	119	0 / 19	▼2	▼0.18%	—N/a
Tripura Legislative Assembly
1988	5,20,697	45.82%	60	26 / 55	▼11	▲0.10	Opposition
1993	5,99,943	44.78%	60	44 / 51	▲18	▼0.40	Government
1998	6,21,804	45.49%	60	38 / 55	▲6	▲0.80	Government
2003	7,11,119	46.82%	60	38 / 55	Steady	▲1.30	Government
2008	9,03,009	48.01%	60	46 / 56	▲8	▲1.10	Government
2013	10,59,327	48.11%	60	49 / 57	▲3	▲0.01	Government
2018	9,93,605	42.22%	60	16 / 57	▼33	▼5.51	Opposition
2023	6,22,829	24.62%	60	11 / 43	▼5	▼17.6	Opposition
Uttar Pradesh Legislative Assembly
2022	5617	0.01%	403	0 / 1	—N/a	▼0.03	—N/a
West Bengal Legislative Assembly
1977	5,080,828	35.46%	294	178 / 224	▲164	▲8.01	Government
1982	8,655,371	38.49%	294	174 / 209	▼4	▲3.03	Government
1987	10,285,723	39.12%	294	187 / 212	▲13	▲0.89	Government
1991	11,418,822	36.87%	294	182 / 204	▲2	▼2.43	Government
1996	13,670,198	37.16%	294	153 / 213	▼32	▲1.05	Government
2001	13,402,603	36.59%	294	143 / 211	▼14	▼1.33	Government
2006	14,652,200	37.13%	294	176 / 212	▲33	▲0.54	Government
2011	14,330,061	30.08%	294	40 / 213	▼136	▼7.05	Opposition
2016	10,802,058	19.75%	294	26 / 148	▼14	▼10.35	Opposition
2021	2,837,276	4.73%	294	0 / 136	▼26	▼15.02	—N/a
2026	2,839,067	4.45%	197	1 / 136	▲1	▼0.28	Opposition

== See also ==
- Electoral history of the Bharatiya Janata Party
- Electoral history of the Communist Party of India
- Electoral history of the Indian National Congress
