= Sheorajvati Nehru =

Indian politician

Member of Parliament, Lok Sabha
- In office 1953 — 1957
- Preceded by: Vijaylakshmi Pandit
- Succeeded by: Pulin Behari Banerji
- Constituency: Lucknow

Personal details
- Political party: Indian National Congress
- Spouse: Kishan Lal Nehru
- Children: 2

Sheorajvati Nehru (1897 — 1987) was an Indian politician and freedom fighter. She represented Lucknow for Congress from 1953 to 1957 in Lok Sabha after winning a by-poll.

She was a relative of Indian Prime Minister Jawaharlal Nehru.
