= Jagat Narain Mulla =

Lawyer and public prosecutor

Pandit Jagat Narain Mulla
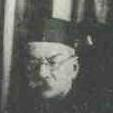

Vice-Chancellors of the University of Lucknow
- In office 1930–1932

Personal details
- Born: 14 December 1864 United Provinces, British India (present-day Uttar Pradesh, India)
- Died: 11 December 1938 (aged 73) Lucknow, United Provinces, British India (present-day Uttar Pradesh, India)
- Children: Anand Narain Mulla
- Education: Dr. Bhimrao Ambedkar University
- Occupation: Barrister; Lawyer

Pandit Jagat Narain Mulla (14 December 1864 in Kashmir – 11 December 1938) was a prominent lawyer and public prosecutor in United Provinces during the British Raj. He served as the public prosecutor on behalf of the British in the Kakori case.

The Kakori Incident involved Pandit Ram Prasad Bismil, Ashfaqulla Khan, Chandrashekhar Azad, Roshan Singh, and other revolutionaries who planned to rob the government treasury from a train at Kakori station near Lucknow to fund an armed revolution in India.

== Early and personal life ==
Jagat Narain Mulla was born to Pandit Kali Sahay Mulla; Kashmiri Pandits held a government position in the United Provinces, allowing Jagat Narayan to receive his education there. He completed his law studies at Agra University and started his legal practice in Lucknow, quickly gaining a reputation among the prominent lawyers of his time. He served as the Vice Chancellor of Lucknow University for three years. He maintained close relationships with notable figures such as Pandit Motilal Nehru, Babu Ganga Prasad Verma, C. Y. Chintamani, Bishan Narayan Dar and Chaubey Mukta Prasad.

He was the father of Anand Narain Mulla, an Urdu poet and a Member of Parliament in independent India.

== Career ==
Jagat Narain Mulla was the Chairman of the Reception Committee of the Lucknow session of the Indian National Congress in 1916 and served as the President of the Lucknow Municipality for 15 years. He was also a member of the Hunter Commission, which was formed to investigate the Jallianwala Bagh massacre; as one of the three Indian members of the committee, he expressed disagreement with the report's findings. Following the Montagu–Chelmsford Reforms, he was elected as a member of the United Provinces Legislative Council and appointed Minister for Local Self-Government. Additionally, he served as the Vice-Chancellor of the University of Lucknow for three years, contributing to the institution's growth and prominence. Furthermore, he was the public prosecutor in the Kakori Conspiracy Case of 1926, where he successfully proved the involvement of the Hindustan Republican Association (HRA) in the robbery.

== Demise ==
In his later years, Jagat Narayan Mulla's health deteriorated, leading him to seek treatment in Switzerland. He died on 11 December 1938.
