= Electoral history of the Bharatiya Janata Party =

The Bharatiya Janata Party is a political party in India. The following article contains the performance history of the organization in the elections, they have contested after their formation.

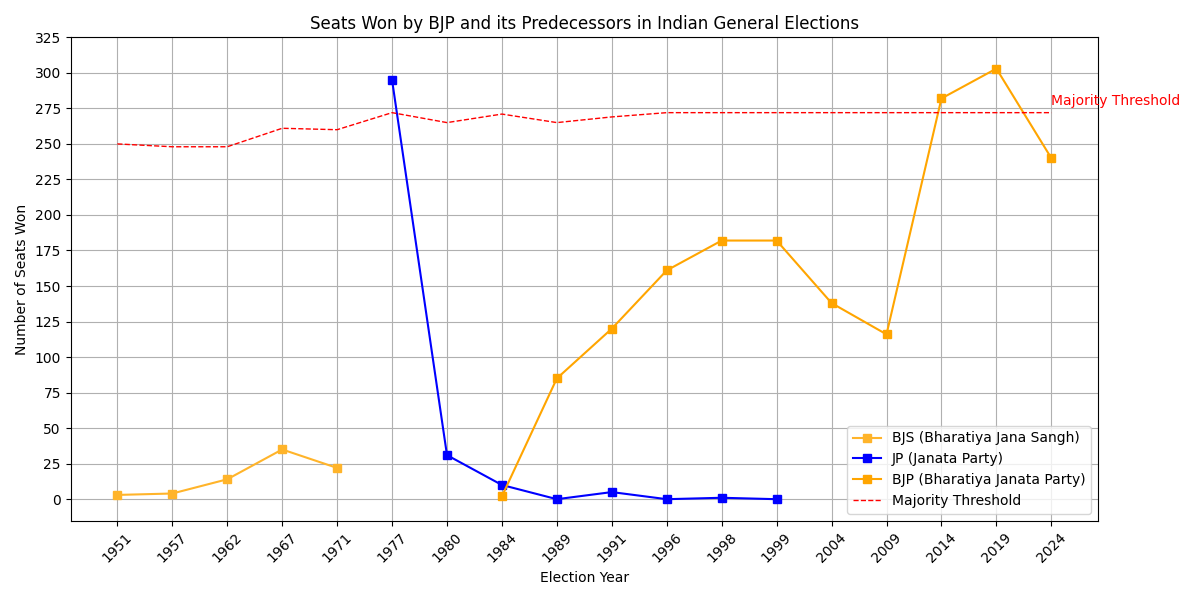
The electoral history of the BJP and its predecessors in general elections

== Lok Sabha ==
Year	Legislature	Party leader	Seats Contested	Seats won	Change in seats	Percentage of votes	Vote swing	Outcome	Ref.
1984	8th Lok Sabha	Atal Bihari Vajpayee	229	2 / 541	▲2	7.74%	–	Opposition	
1989	9th Lok Sabha	Lal Krishna Advani	225	85 / 545	▲83	11.36%	▲3.62%	Outside support for NF	
1991	10th Lok Sabha	Lal Krishna Advani	477	120 / 545	▲35	20.11%	▲8.75%	Official Opposition	
1996	11th Lok Sabha	Atal Bihari Vajpayee	471	161 / 545	▲41	20.29%	▲0.18%	Government, later opposition	
1998	12th Lok Sabha	Atal Bihari Vajpayee	388	182 / 545	▲21	25.59%	▲5.30%	Coalition	
1999	13th Lok Sabha	Atal Bihari Vajpayee	339	182 / 545	Steady	23.75%	▼1.84%	Coalition	
2004	14th Lok Sabha	Lal Krishna Advani	364	138 / 543	▼44	22.16%	▼1.69%	Official Opposition	
2009	15th Lok Sabha	Lal Krishna Advani	433	116 / 543	▼22	18.80%	▼3.36%	Official Opposition	
2014	16th Lok Sabha	Narendra Modi	425	282 / 543	▲166	31.34%	▲12.54%	Majority	
2019	17th Lok Sabha	Narendra Modi	437	303 / 543	▲21	37.46%	▲6.12%	Majority	
2024	18th Lok Sabha	Narendra Modi	441	240 / 543	▼63	36.56%	▼0.9%	Coalition	

All time-BJP Lok Sabha seat count

== State Legislative Assemblies ==
=== Andhra Pradesh ===
Year	Total Seats	Seats Contested	Seats won	Change in seats	Votes	Percentage of votes	Vote swing
1983	294	80	3	-	582,464	2.76	-
1985	294	10	8	▲5	372,978	1.62	▼1.14
1989	294	12	5	▼3	512,305	1.78	▲0.16
1994	294	280	3	▼2	1,210,878	3.89	▲2.11
1999	294	24	12	▲9	1,223,481	3.67	▼0.22
2004	294	27	2	▼10	942,008	2.63	▼1.04
2009	294	271	2	Steady	1,192,814	2.84	▲0.21
2014	294	58	9	▲7	2,000,677	4.13	▲1.29
After the state's bifurcation in 2014
2019	175	173	0	▼4	264,437	0.84	-
2024	175	10	8	▲8	953,977	2.83	▲1.99

=== Arunachal Pradesh ===
Year	Total Seats	Seats Contested	Seats won	Change in seats	Votes	Percentage of votes	Vote swing
1984	30	6	1	-	17,283	7.69	-
1990	60	Not Contested					
1995	60	15	0	Steady	14,335	3.37	-
1999	60	23	0	Steady	44,556	10.83	▲7.46
2004	60	39	9	▲9	87,312	19.0	▲8.17
2009	60	18	3	▼6	29,929	5.21	▼13.79
2014	60	42	11	▲8	157,412	30.97	▲25.76
2019	60	60	41	▲30	315,540	50.86	▲19.89
2024	60	60	46	▲5	332,773	54.57	▲3.71

=== Assam ===
Year	Total Seats	Seats Contested	Seats won	Change in seats	Votes	Percentage of votes	Vote swing
1983	126	Not Contested					
1985	126	37	0	-	79,068	1.07	-
1991	126	48	10	▲10	548,271	6.55	▲5.48
1996	126	117	4	▼6	946,236	10.41	▲4.93
2001	126	46	8	▲4	995,004	9.35	▼1.06
2006	126	125	10	▲2	1,581,925	11.98	▲2.63
2011	126	120	5	▼5	1,584,895	11.47	▼0.51
2016	126	89	60	▲55	4,992,185	29.51	▲18.04
2021	126	93	60	Steady	6,384,538	33.21	▲3.7
2026	126	90	82	▲22	8,192,498	37.81	▲4.6

=== Bihar ===
Year	Total Seats	Seats Contested	Seats won	Change in seats	Votes	Percentage of votes	Vote swing
1980	324	246	21	-	1,891,325	8.41	-
1985	324	234	16	▼5	1,833,275	7.54	▼0.87
1990	324	237	39	▲23	3,721,392	11.61	▲4.07
1995	324	315	41	▲2	4,480,363	12.96	▲1.35
2000	324	168	67	▲26	5,424,687	14.64	▲1.68
After the state's bifurcation in 2000
2005 (FEB)	243	103	37	-	2,686,290	10.97	-
2005 (OCT)	243	102	55	▲18	3,686,720	15.65	▲4.68
2010	243	102	91	▲36	4,790,436	16.49	▲0.84
2015	243	157	53	▼38	9,308,015	24.42	▲7.93
2020	243	110	74	▲21	8,202,067	19.46	▼4.96
2025	243	101	89	▲15	10,081,143	20.08	▲0.62

=== Chhattisgarh ===
Year	Total Seats	Seats Contested	Seats won	Change in seats	Votes	Percentage of votes	Vote swing
2003	90	90	50	-	3,789,914	39.26	-
2008	90	90	50	Steady	4,333,934	40.33	▲1.07
2013	90	90	49	▼1	5,365,272	41.04	▲0.71
2018	90	90	15	▼34	4,706,830	32.97	▼8.07
2023	90	90	54	▲39	7,234,968	46.27	▲13.33

=== Goa ===
Year	Total Seats	Seats Contested	Seats won	Change in seats	Votes	Percentage of votes	Vote swing
1984	30	16	0	-	4915	1.21	-
1989	40	7	0	Steady	1985	0.39	▼0.82
1994	40	12	4	▲4	52,094	9.05	▲8.66
1999	40	39	10	▲6	150,959	26.15	▲17.1
2002	40	39	17	▲7	226,350	35.57	▲9.42
2007	40	33	14	▼3	215,605	30.32	▼5.25
2012	40	28	21	▲7	294,392	34.68	▲4.36
2017	40	36	13	▼8	297,588	32.48	▼2.2
2022	40	40	20	▲7	316,573	33.3	▲0.82

=== Gujarat ===
Year	Total Seats	Seats Contested	Seats won	Change in seats	Votes	Percentage of votes	Vote swing
1980	182	127	9	-	1,090,652	14.02	-
1985	182	124	11	▲2	1,379,120	14.96	▲0.94
1990	182	143	67	▲56	3,386,256	26.69	▲11.73
1995	182	182	121	▲54	7,672,401	42.51	▲15.82
1998	182	182	117	▼4	7,300,826	44.81	▲2.3
2002	182	182	127	▲10	10,194,353	49.85	▲5.04
2007	182	182	117	▼10	10,739,972	49.12	▼0.73
2012	182	182	115	▼2	13,119,579	47.85	▼1.27
2017	182	182	99	▼16	14,724,031	49.05	▲1.2
2022	182	182	156	▲57	16,707,962	52.5	▲3.45

=== Haryana ===
Year	Total Seats	Seats Contested	Seats won	Change in seats	Votes	Percentage of votes	Vote swing
1982	90	24	6	-	376,604	7.67	-
1987	90	20	16	▲10	613,819	10.08	▲2.41
1991	90	89	2	▼14	582,850	9.43	▼0.65
1996	90	25	11	▲9	672,558	8.88	▼0.55
2000	90	29	6	▼5	684,283	8.94	▲0.06
2005	90	90	2	▼4	949,176	10.36	▲1.42
2009	90	90	4	▲2	857,831	9.04	▲1.32
2014	90	90	47	▲43	4,125,285	33.20	▲24.16
2019	90	90	40	▼7	4,569,016	36.49	▲3.29
2024	90	89	48	▲8	5,548,800	39.94	▲3.45

=== Himachal Pradesh ===
Year	Total Seats	Seats Contested	Seats won	Change in seats	Votes	Percentage of votes	Vote swing
1982	68	67	29	-	545,037	35.16	-
1985	68	57	7	▼22	502,252	30.61	▼4.55
1990	68	51	46	▲39	858,518	41.78	▲11.17
1993	68	68	8	▼38	840,233	36.14	▼5.64
1998	68	68	31	▲23	995,482	39.02	▲2.88
2003	68	68	16	▼25	1,079,882	35.38	▼3.64
2007	68	68	41	▲25	1,441,142	43.78	▲8.4
2012	68	68	26	▼15	1,300,756	38.47	▼5.31
2017	68	68	44	▲18	1,846,432	48.79	▲10.32
2022	68	68	25	▼19	1,814,530	43.00	▼5.79

=== Jammu and Kashmir ===
Year	Total Seats	Seats Contested	Seats won	Change in seats	Votes	Percentage of votes	Vote swing
1983	76	27	0	-	70,193	3.19	-
1987	76	29	2	▲2	132,528	5.10	▲1.91
1996	87	53	8	▲6	301,238	12.13	▲7.03
2002	87	58	1	▼7	227,633	8.57	▼3.56
2008	87	64	11	▲10	493,757	12.45	▲3.88
2014	87	75	25	▲14	1,107,194	22.98	▲10.53
After The Jammu and Kashmir Reorganisation Act In 2019
2024	90	61	29	▲4	1,462,225	25.64	▲2.66

=== Jharkhand ===
Year	Total Seats	Seats Contested	Seats won	Change in seats	Votes	Percentage of votes	Vote swing
2005	81	63	30	-	2,387,130	23.57	-
2009	81	67	18	▼12	2,074,215	20.18	▼3.39
2014	81	72	37	▲19	4,334,728	31.26	▲11.08
2019	81	79	25	▼12	5,022,374	33.37	▲2.11
2024	81	68	21	▼4	5,921,474	33.18	▼0.19

=== Karnataka ===
Year	Total Seats	Seats Contested	Seats won	Change in seats	Votes	Percentage of votes	Vote swing
1983	224	110	18	-	1,024,892	7.93	-
1985	224	116	2	▼16	571,280	3.88	▼4.05
1989	224	118	4	▲2	755,032	4.14	▲0.26
1994	224	223	40	▲36	3,517,119	16.99	▲12.85
1999	224	149	44	▲4	4,598,741	20.69	▲3.7
2004	224	198	79	▲35	7,118,658	28.33	▲7.64
2008	224	224	110	▲31	8,857,754	33.86	▲5.53
2013	224	223	40	▼70	6,236,227	19.89	▼13.97
2018	224	223	104	▲64	13,268,284	36.22	▲16.33
2023	224	224	66	▼38	14,096,604	36.00	▼0.35

=== Kerala ===
Year	Total Seats	Seats Contested	Seats won	Change in seats	Votes	Percentage of votes	Vote swing
1982	140	69	0	-	263,331	2.75	-
1987	140	116	0	Steady	708,261	5.56	▲2.81
1991	140	137	0	Steady	674,525	4.76	▼0.8
1996	140	127	0	Steady	781,090	5.48	▲0.72
2001	140	123	0	Steady	789,764	5.02	▼0.46
2006	140	136	0	Steady	738,244	4.75	▼0.27
2011	140	138	0	Steady	1,053,654	6.03	▲1.28
2016	140	98	1	▲1	2,129,726	10.53	▲4.5
2021	140	115	0	▼1	2,354,468	11.3	▲0.77
2026	140	98	3	▲3	2,466,178	11.42	▲0.12

=== Madhya Pradesh ===
Year	Total Seats	Seats Contested	Seats won	Change in seats	Votes	Percentage of votes	Vote swing
1980	320	310	60	-	3,665,201	30.34	-
1985	320	312	58	▼2	4,606,133	32.45	▲2.11
1990	320	269	220	▲162	7,779,942	39.14	▲6.69
1993	320	320	117	▼103	9,188,602	38.82	▼0.32
1998	320	320	119	▲2	10,430,233	39.28	▲0.46
After the state's bifurcation in 2000
2003	230	230	173	-	10,836,807	42.50	-
2008	230	228	143	▼30	9,493,641	37.64	▼4.86
2013	230	230	165	▲22	15,191,335	44.88	▲7.24
2018	230	230	109	▼56	15,643,623	41.02	▼3.86
2023	230	230	163	▲54	21,116,197	48.55	▲7.53

=== Maharashtra ===
Year	Total Seats	Seats Contested	Seats won	Change in seats	Votes	Percentage of votes	Vote swing
1980	288	145	14	-	1,645,734	9.38	-
1985	288	67	16	▲2	1,590,351	7.25	▼2.13
1990	288	104	42	▲26	3,180,482	10.71	▲3.46
1995	288	116	65	▲23	4,932,767	12.80	▲2.09
1999	288	117	56	▼9	4,776,301	14.54	▲1.74
2004	288	111	54	▼2	5,717,287	13.67	▼0.87
2009	288	119	46	▼8	6,352,147	14.02	▲0.35
2014	288	260	122	▲76	14,709,276	27.81	▲13.79
2019	288	164	105	▼17	14,199,375	25.75	▼2.06
2024	288	149	132	▲27	17,293,650	26.77	▲1.02

=== Manipur ===
Year	Total Seats	Seats Contested	Seats won	Change in seats	Votes	Percentage of votes	Vote swing
1984	60	12	0	-	6,163	0.71	-
1990	54	11	0	Steady	18,549	1.87	▲1.16
1995	60	20	1	▲1	38,405	3.35	▲1.48
2000	60	39	6	▲5	142,174	11.28	▲7.93
2002	60	46	4	▼2	126,044	9.55	▼1.73
2007	60	14	0	▼4	12,536	0.85	▼8.7
2012	60	19	0	Steady	29,663	2.12	▲1.27
2017	60	60	21	▲21	601,539	36.28	▲34.16
2022	60	60	32	▲11	702,632	37.83	▲1.55

=== Meghalaya ===
Year	Total Seats	Seats Contested	Seats won	Change in seats	Votes	Percentage of votes	Vote swing
1993	60	20	0	-	29,948	3.68	-
1998	60	28	3	▲3	41,924	5.01	▲1.33
2003	60	28	2	▼1	48,932	5.42	▲0.41
2008	60	23	1	▼1	29,465	2.67	▼2.75
2013	60	13	0	▼1	16,800	1.27	▼1.4
2018	60	47	2	▲2	151,292	9.63	▲8.36
2023	60	60	2	Steady	173,083	9.17	▼0.46

=== Mizoram ===
Year	Total Seats	Seats Contested	Seats won	Change in seats	Votes	Percentage of votes	Vote swing
1993	40	8	0	-	10,004	3.11	-
1998	40	12	0	Steady	8,448	2.50	▼0.61
2003	40	8	0	Steady	7,823	1.87	▼0.63
2008	40	9	0	Steady	2,222	0.44	▼1.43
2013	40	17	0	Steady	2,139	0.37	▼0.07
2018	40	39	1	▲1	51,087	8.09	▲7.72
2023	40	23	2	▲1	35,524	5.06	▼3.03

=== Nagaland ===
Year	Total Seats	Seats Contested	Seats won	Change in seats	Votes	Percentage of votes	Vote swing
1987	60	2	0	-	926	0.19	-
1989	60	Not Contested					
1993	60	6	0	-	2,561	0.35	-
1998	60	Not Contested					
2003	60	38	7	-	96,658	10.88	-
2008	60	23	2	▼5	60,627	5.35	▼5.53
2013	60	11	1	▼1	19,121	1.75	▼3.6
2018	60	20	12	▲11	153,864	15.31	▲13.56
2023	60	20	12	Steady	215,336	18.81	▲3.5

=== Odisha ===
Year	Total Seats	Seats Contested	Seats won	Change in seats	Votes	Percentage of votes	Vote swing
1980	147	28	0	-	86,421	1.36	-
1985	147	67	1	▲1	204,346	2.60	▲1.24
1990	147	63	2	▲1	390,060	3.56	▲0.96
1995	147	144	9	▲7	1,245,996	7.88	▲4.32
2000	147	63	38	▲29	2,570,074	18.20	▲10.32
2004	147	63	32	▼6	2,898,105	17.11	▲1.09
2009	147	145	6	▼26	2,674,067	15.05	▼2.06
2014	147	147	10	▲4	3,874,748	17.99	▲2.94
2019	146	146	23	▲13	7,612,449	32.49	▲14.5
2024	147	147	78	▲55	10,064,827	40.07	▲7.58

=== Punjab ===
Year	Total Seats	Seats Contested	Seats won	Change in seats	Votes	Percentage of votes	Vote swing
1980	117	41	1	-	405,106	6.48	-
1985	117	26	6	▲5	345,560	4.99	▼1.49
1992	117	66	6	Steady	495,161	16.48	▲11.49
1997	117	22	18	▲12	857,219	8.33	▼8.15
2002	117	23	3	▼15	583,214	5.67	▼2.66
2007	117	23	19	▲16	1,046,451	8.28	▲2.61
2012	117	23	12	▼7	998,098	7.18	▼1.1
2017	117	23	3	▼9	833,092	5.39	▼1.79
2022	117	73	2	▼1	1,027,143	6.60	▲1.21

=== Rajasthan ===
Year	Total Seats	Seats Contested	Seats won	Change in seats	Votes	Percentage of votes	Vote swing
1980	200	123	32	-	1,721,321	18.60	-
1985	200	118	39	▲7	2,437,594	21.24	▲2.64
1990	200	128	85	▲46	3,744,945	25.25	▲4.01
1993	199	196	95	▲10	6498330	38.60	▲13.35
1998	200	196	33	▼62	6,258,509	33.23	▼5.37
2003	200	197	120	▲87	8,929,572	39.20	▲5.97
2008	200	193	78	▼42	8,258,966	34.27	▼4.93
2013	200	200	163	▲85	13,939,203	45.17	▲10.9
2018	200	200	73	▼90	13,829,046	38.77	▼6.4
2023	200	200	115	▲42	16,608,741	41.70	▲2.93

=== Sikkim ===
Year	Total Seats	Seats Contested	Seats won	Change in seats	Votes	Percentage of votes	Vote swing
1994	32	3	0	-	274	0.16	-
1999	32	Not Contested					
2004	32	4	0	-	667	0.34	-
2009	32	11	0	Steady	1,966	0.78	▲0.44
2014	32	13	0	Steady	2208	0.71	▼0.07
2019	32	12	0	Steady	5,700	1.62	▲0.91
2024	32	31	0	Steady	19,956	5.18	▲3.56

=== Tamil Nadu ===
Year	Total Seats	Seats Contested	Seats won	Change in seats	Votes	Percentage of votes	Vote swing
1980	234	10	0	-	13,177	0.07	-
1984	234	15	0	Steady	54,390	0.25	▲0.18
1989	234	31	0	Steady	84,865	0.35	▲0.10
1991	234	99	0	Steady	419,229	1.70	▲1.35
1996	234	143	1	▲1	490,453	1.81	▲0.11
2001	234	21	4	▲3	895,352	3.19	▲1.38
2006	234	225	0	▼4	666,823	2.02	▼1.17
2011	234	204	0	Steady	819,577	2.22	▲0.20
2016	234	188	0	Steady	1,228,704	2.84	▲0.62
2021	234	20	4	▲4	1,213,510	2.62	▼0.22
2026	234	33	1	▼3	1,467,024	2.97	▲0.35

=== Telangana ===
Year	Total Seats	Seats Contested	Seats won	Change in seats	Votes	Percentage of votes	Vote swing
2018	119	117	1	-	1,443,799	6.98	-
2023	119	111	8	▲7	3,257,511	13.90	▲6.92

=== Tripura ===
Year	Total Seats	Seats Contested	Seats won	Change in seats	Votes	Percentage of votes	Vote swing
1983	60	4	0	-	578	0.06	-
1988	60	10	0	Steady	1,757	0.15	▲0.09
1993	60	38	0	Steady	27,078	2.02	▲1.87
1998	60	60	0	Steady	80,272	5.87	▲3.85
2003	60	21	0	Steady	20,032	1.32	▼4.55
2008	60	49	0	Steady	28,102	1.49	▲0.17
2013	60	50	0	Steady	33,808	1.54	▲0.05
2018	60	51	36	▲36	1,025,673	43.59	▲42.05
2023	60	55	32	▼3	985,797	38.97	▼4.62

=== Uttar Pradesh ===
Year	Total Seats	Seats Contested	Seats won	Change in seats	Votes	Percentage of votes	Vote swing
1980	425	400	11	-	2,777,731	10.76	-
1985	425	347	16	▲5	2,890,884	9.83	▼0.93
1989	425	275	57	▲41	4,522,867	11.61	▲1.78
1991	425	415	221	▲164	11,770,214	31.45	▲19.84
1996	424	422	177	▼44	16,637,720	33.30	▲1.85
After the state's bifurcation in 2000
2002	403	320	88	-	10,776,078	20.08	-
2007	403	350	51	▼37	8,851,199	16.97	▼3.11
2012	403	398	47	▼4	11,371,080	15.00	▼1.97
2017	403	384	312	▲265	34,403,299	39.67	▲24.67
2022	403	376	255	▼57	38,051,721	41.29	▲1.62

=== Uttarakhand ===
Year	Total Seats	Seats Contested	Seats won	Change in seats	Votes	Percentage of	Vote swing
2002	70	69	19	-	728,134	25.45	-
2007	69	69	34	▲15	1,203,726	31.90	▲6.45
2012	70	70	31	▼3	1,4083,41	33.13	▲1.23
2017	70	70	57	▲26	2,314,250	46.51	▲13.38
2022	70	70	47	▼10	2,383,838	44.33	▼2.18

=== West Bengal ===
Year	Total Seats	Seats Contested	Seats won	Change in seats	Votes	Percentage of	Vote swing
1982	294	52	0	-	129,994	0.58	-
1987	294	57	0	Steady	134,867	0.51	▼0.07
1991	294	291	0	Steady	3,513,121	11.34	▲10.76
1996	294	292	0	Steady	2,372,480	6.45	▼4.89
2001	294	266	0	Steady	1,901,351	5.19	▼1.26
2006	294	29	0	Steady	760,236	1.93	▼3.26
2011	294	289	0	Steady	1,934,650	4.06	▲2.13
2016	294	291	3	▲3	5,555,134	10.16	▲6.1
2021	294	293	77	▲74	22,905,474	37.97	▲27.81
2026	294	294	208	▲131	29,374,470	45.92	▲7.95

=== Delhi ===
Year	Total Seats	Seats Contested	Seats won	Change in seats	Votes	Percentage of votes	Vote swing
1993	70	70	49	-	1,520,675	42.82	-
1998	70	67	15	▼34	1,390,689	34.02	▼8.8
2003	70	70	20	▲5	1,589,323	35.22	▲1.2
2008	70	69	23	▲3	2,244,629	36.34	▲1.12
2013	70	68	31	▲8	2,604,100	33.07	▼3.27
2015	70	69	3	▼28	2,890,485	32.19	▼0.88
2020	70	67	8	▲5	3,575,529	38.51	▲6.32
2025	70	68	48	▲40	4,323,110	45.56	▲7.05

=== Puducherry ===
Year	Assembly	Total Seats	Seats Contested	Seats won	Change in seats	Votes	Percentage of votes	Vote swing	Nominated MLAs
1985	7th	30	3	0	-	158	0.05	0.05	0
1990	8th	30	8	0	Steady	2,154	0.51	▲0.46	0
1991	9th	30	12	0	Steady	3,045	0.78	▲0.27	0
1996	10th	30	14	0	Steady	5,217	1.13	▲0.35	0
2001	11th	30	5	1	▲1	22,164	4.65	▲3.52	0
2006	12th	30	27	0	▼1	17,356	3.07	▼1.58	0
2011	13th	30	20	0	Steady	9,183	1.32	▼1.75	1
2016	14th	30	30	0	Steady	19,303	2.41	▲1.09	3
2021	15th	30	9	6	▲6	114,298	13.66	▲11.25	3
2026	16th	30	10	4	▼2	105,583	12.19	▼1.47	

== See also ==
- National Democratic Alliance
- Electoral history of the Communist Party of India
- Electoral history of the Communist Party of India (Marxist)
- Electoral history of the Indian National Congress
- Electoral history of Atal Bihari Vajpayee
- Electoral history of L. K. Advani
- Electoral history of Narendra Modi
- Electoral history of Rajnath Singh
- Electoral history of Yogi Adityanath

== Bibliography ==
- "Statistical report on general elections, 1991 to the Tenth Lok Sabha" (PDF). Election Commission of India. Archived from the original (PDF) on 18 July 2014.
- "Statistical report on general elections, 1996 to the Eleventh Lok Sabha" (PDF). Election Commission of India.
- "Statistical report on general elections, 1998 to the Twelfth Lok Sabha" (PDF). Election Commission of India. Archived from the original (PDF) on 18 July 2014.
- "Statistical report on general elections, 1999 to the Thirteenth Lok Sabha" (PDF). Election Commission of India. Archived from the original (PDF) on 18 July 2014.
- "Statistical report on general elections, 2004 to the Fourteenth Lok Sabha" (PDF). Election Commission of India.
- "Performance of National Parties" (PDF). Election Commission of India.
