= Electoral history of L. K. Advani =

Elections featuring Deputy Prime Minister of India

This is a summary of the electoral history of Lal Krishna Advani, who was Deputy Prime Minister of India from 2002 to 2004.

Advani entered into the Parliament of India in 1970 as a Member of Rajya Sabha. He served as a Member of Rajya Sabha for four terms until 1989.

Advani contested his first Lok Sabha election in 1989 from New Delhi. He was elected as a Member of the Lok Sabha by defeating V. Mohini Giri of the Indian National Congress. Later in 1991, he contested from two constituencies : Gandhinagar and New Delhi. He was elected as Member of the Lok Sabha from both the constituencies, defeating G. I. Patel in Gandhinagar and Rajesh Khanna in New Delhi. To comply with the law that an elected representative cannot represent more than one constituency, he vacated the New Delhi seat. In 1996, he did not contest Lok Sabha elections from any constituency over allegations of involvement in the Hawala scandal.

In 1998, Advani was again elected to the Lok Sabha from the Gandhinagar constituency. Later he was re-elected from the Gandhinagar in 1999, 2004, 2009 and 2014 and represented Gandhinagar in Parliament till 2019, when he retired from electoral politics and was succeeded by Amit Shah.

Advani served a total four terms in Parliament as a Member of Rajya Sabha and seven terms as a Member of the Lok Sabha.

== Summary ==
=== Rajya Sabha elections ===
Election	House	Constituency	Term in office	Party
1970	Rajya Sabha	Delhi	1970-1976	Bharatiya Jana Sangh (Note: From 1977 to 1980 Advani represented the Janata Party after the Bharatiya Jana Sangh merged with it. Following the split in Janata Party and formation of the Bharatiya Janata Party in 1980, Advani represented the Bharatiya Janata Party subsequently.)
1976	Rajya Sabha	Gujarat	1976-1982	Bharatiya Jana Sangh
1982	Rajya Sabha	Madhya Pradesh	1982-1988	Bharatiya Janata Party
1988	Rajya Sabha	Madhya Pradesh	1988-1989	Bharatiya Janata Party

=== Lok Sabha elections ===
Election	House	Constituency	Term in office	Party
1989	Lok Sabha	New Delhi	1989-1991	Bharatiya Janata Party
1991	Lok Sabha	New Delhi	Vacated (Note: To comply with the law that an elected representative cannot represent more than one constituency, he vacated the New Delhi seat.)	Bharatiya Janata Party
1991	Lok Sabha	Gandhinagar	1991-1996	Bharatiya Janata Party
1998	Lok Sabha	Gandhinagar	1998-1999	Bharatiya Janata Party
1999	Lok Sabha	Gandhinagar	1999-2004	Bharatiya Janata Party
2004	Lok Sabha	Gandhinagar	2004-2009	Bharatiya Janata Party
2009	Lok Sabha	Gandhinagar	2009-2014	Bharatiya Janata Party
2014	Lok Sabha	Gandhinagar	2014-2019	Bharatiya Janata Party

== Detailed results ==
=== 1989 results ===
1989 Indian general election: New Delhi
Party	Candidate	Votes	%	±%
BJP	Lal Krishna Advani	1,29,256	55.54	
INC	V. Mohini Giri	97,415	41.85	
Independent	Maharaj Kumar	848	0.36	
Independent	Harkesh Singh Ujjainwal	728	0.31	
Independent	Rattan	531	0.23	
Majority		31,841	13.69	
Turnout		2,32,744	54.19	
BJP gain from INC		Swing		

=== 1991 results ===
1991 Indian general election: Gandhinagar
Party	Candidate	Votes	%	±%
BJP	L. K. Advani	356,902	57.97	−8.25
INC	G. I. Patel	231,223	37.56	+7.23
JP	Sendhaji Thakor	6,635	1.08	N/A
Independent	Purushottam Mavalankar	4,757	0.77	N/A
JD	Narendra Dixit	4,441	0.72	N/A
Margin of victory		125,679	20.41	−9.48
Turnout		625,226	45.46	−12.41
BJP hold		Swing		

1991 Indian general election: New Delhi
Party	Candidate	Votes	%	±%
BJP	Lal Krishna Advani	93,662	43.40	
INC	Rajesh Khanna	92,073	42.66	
JD	Manju Mohan	20,439	9.47	
JP	Himanshu Pandey	2,834	1.31	
BSP	Om Parkash	641	0.30	
Majority		1,589	0.74	
Turnout		2,15,834	47.32	
BJP hold		Swing		

=== General election 1998 ===
1998 Indian general election: Gandhinagar
Party	Candidate	Votes	%	±%
BJP	L. K. Advani	541,340	59.86	+7.98
INC	P. K. Datta	264,639	29.26	−10.37
AIRJP	Chaitanya Shambhu Maharaj	90,290	9.98	−3.33
ABP	Sanjiv Mani Shanker Pandya	4,003	0.44	N/A
Margin of victory		276,701	30.60	+18.33
Turnout		929,643	52.13	+23.70
BJP hold		Swing		

=== General election 1999 ===
1999 Indian general election: Gandhinagar
Party	Candidate	Votes	%	±%
BJP	L. K. Advani	453,299	61.14	+1.28
INC	T. N. Seshan	264,285	35.65	+6.39
Independent	Sunilbhai Nareshchandra Shah	9,938	1.34	N/A
SP	Mod Shankarbhai Daljibhai	5,256	0.71	N/A
Margin of victory		189,014	25.49	−5.11
Turnout		741,283	40.42	−11.71
BJP hold		Swing		

=== General election 2004 ===
2004 Indian general election: Gandhinagar
Party	Candidate	Votes	%	±%
BJP	L. K. Advani	516,120	61.04	−0.10
INC	Gabhaji Mangaji Thakor	298,982	35.36	−0.29
Independent	Sunil Shah	8,412	0.99	−0.35
Independent	Vitthalbhai Pandya	8,395	0.99	N/A
BSP	L. N. Medipally	6,660	0.79	N/A
Margin of victory		217,138	25.68	+0.19
Turnout		845,576	54.42	+14.00
BJP hold		Swing		

=== General election 2009 ===
2009 Indian general election: Gandhinagar
Party	Candidate	Votes	%	±%
BJP	L. K. Advani	4,34,044	54.89	−6.15
INC	Sureshkumar Chaturdas Patel	3,12,297	39.49	+4.13
Independent	Dr. Mallika Sarabhai	9,268	1.17	N/A
Independent	Rahul Chimanhbhai Mehta	7,305	0.92	N/A
Independent	Mahantshri Dharamdasbapu	6,612	0.84	N/A
BSP	Rakesh Pandey	5,907	0.75	−0.04
Independent	Sukhdevsingh Parbatsinh Vaghela	4,348	0.55	N/A
Margin of victory		1,21,747	15.40	−10.28
Turnout		7,90,737	50.83	−3.59
BJP hold		Swing	-6.15	

=== General election 2014 ===
2014 Indian general election: Gandhinagar
Party	Candidate	Votes	%	±%
BJP	L. K. Advani	7,73,539	68.12	+13.23
INC	Kiritbhai Ishvarbhai Patel	2,90,418	25.58	−13.91
AAP	Rituraj Mehta	19,966	1.76	N/A
Independent	Rahul Chimanhbhai Mehta	9,767	0.86	−0.06
Independent	Kishorsinh Mahobatsinh Vaghela	6,705	0.59	N/A
BSP	Niranjan Ghosh	6,068	0.53	−0.22
Margin of victory		4,83,121	42.54	+27.14
Turnout		11,37,014	65.57	+14.74
BJP hold		Swing	+13.23	

== See also ==
- Electoral history of the Bharatiya Janata Party
- Electoral history of Atal Bihari Vajpayee
- Electoral history of Narendra Modi
- Electoral history of Rajnath Singh
- Electoral history of Yogi Adityanath
