= B. K. Dhaon =

Indian politician

Member of Parliament, Lok Sabha
- In office 1962–1967
- Preceded by: Pulin Behari Banerji
- Succeeded by: Anand Narain Mulla
- Constituency: Lucknow, Uttar Pradesh

Personal details
- Born: 12 December 1901 Lucknow, British India (present-day Uttar Pradesh, India)
- Died: 26 November 1968 (aged 66)
- Party: Indian National Congress
- Spouse: Chandra Dhaon
- Children: 3 Sons and 4 Daughters

B. K. Dhaon (1901-1968) was an Indian politician. He was elected to the Lok Sabha, the lower house of the Parliament of India from the Lucknow constituency of Uttar Pradesh as a member of the Indian National Congress.
