= Anand Narain Mulla =

Urdu author (1901–1997)

- Born: Anand Narain Mulla; October 1901; Lucknow, NWP, British India
- Died: 13 June 1997 (aged 95)

Philosophical work
- Era: 20th Century
- Region: India

Signature
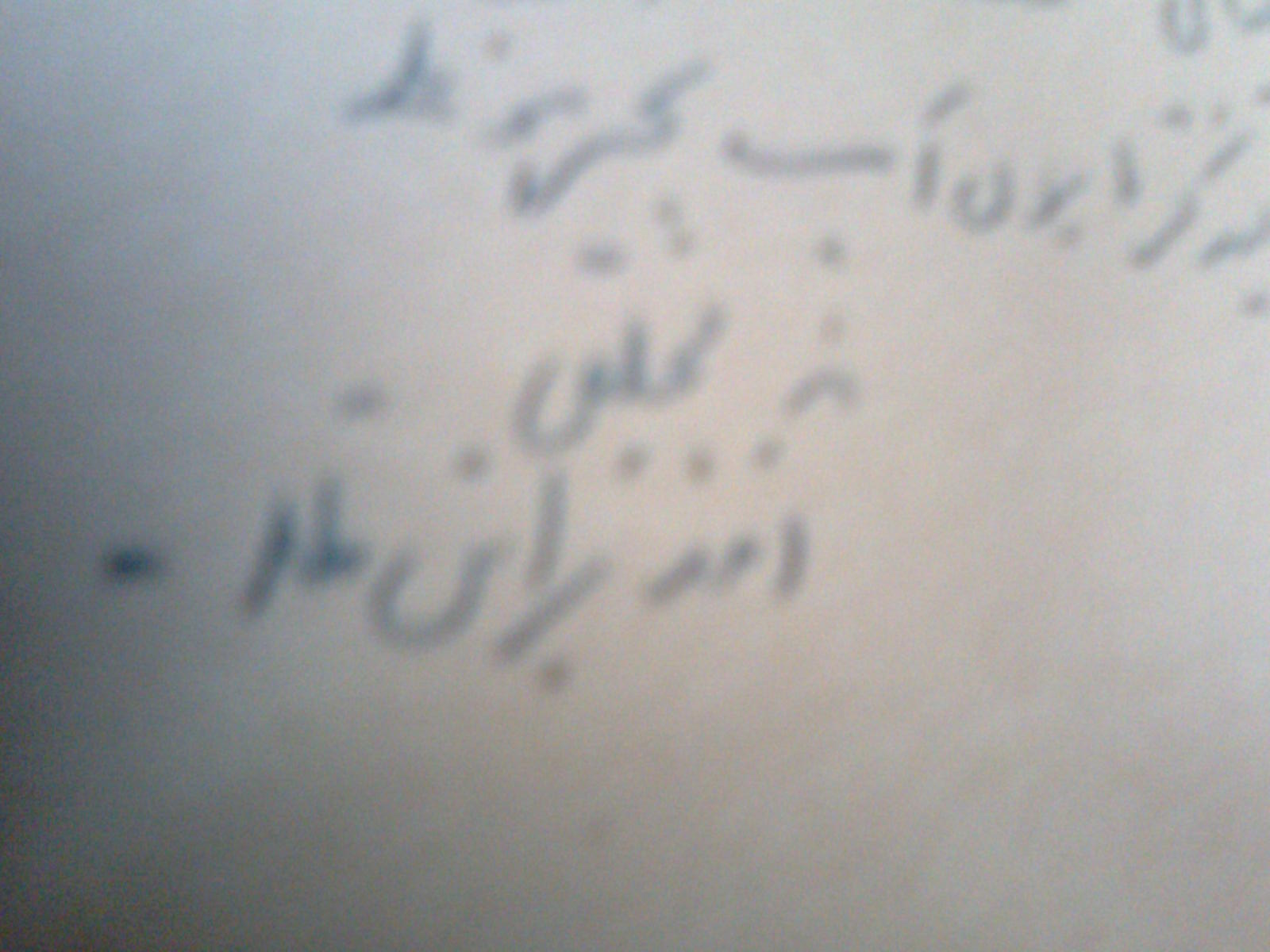

Anand Narain Mulla (October 1901 – 13 June 1997) was an Indian Urdu poet and a retired high court judge. He served as a Member of Parliament in both the Lok Sabha and the Rajya Sabha.

== Life ==
Anand Narain Mulla was born in a Brahmin family at Lucknow in the North-Western Provinces of British India, in October 1901 and educated at Government Jubilee High School and College there. Subsequently, he obtained a Master of Arts in English literature from the University of Lucknow in 1923. He won the Sahitya Akademi award in Urdu in 1964 for his poetry, specifically the book Meri Hadis-e-Umr-e-Gurezan. His first collection of poems, Ju-yi shir, published in 1949, was followed by Hans cog and Bamhina bol. He was also a recipient of the Iqbal Samman, a literary award, when aged 92.

His father, Jagat Narain Mulla, was an advocate and government prosecutor. Anand Narain Mulla, a Kashmiri Brahmin, was himself a lawyer. In 1954 he became a judge of the Allahabad High Court, which he remained until 1961.

Mulla was a member of the 4th Lok Sabha (1967–1970), elected as an Independent candidate from the Lucknow constituency. He was later elected as a Rajya Sabha member (1972–1978) as a nominee of the governing Indian National Congress. In his political career, he was greatly guided by the senior leader Nirmal Chandra Chaturvedi, MLC.

Mulla died in New Delhi on 12 June 1997, aged 96 years.
