= Jamuna Nishad =

Indian politician (1953–2010)

Jamuna Prasad Nishad (1953 – 19 November 2010) was an Indian politician from the Bahujan Samaj Party (BSP), representing the Pipraich constituency in the Uttar Pradesh Vidhan Sabha (Legislative Assembly). He belongs to Nishad Community of OBC. Nishad became the Minister for Fisheries in the Mayawati government, but was forced to resign after being named on charges of murdering a policeman. He was also named in eight other criminal charges.

== Political career ==
Nishad drew his political support from the OBC community in eastern U.P., and also from Muslims. Despite contesting about fifteen elections, he had won only twice, once as a village mayor (gram pradhan) and then in 2007 to the state legislative assembly. He first contested the Assembly elections in 1985 as an independent, and then again in 1989 and 1991, losing on all three occasions. Subsequently he was fielded by the Samajwadi Party (SP), and lost Lok Sabha elections to Yogi Adityanath in 1998, 1999 and 2004.

In 1996, he changed affiliations to the Bahujan Samaj Party (BSP) but lost again from Pipraich. In 2002, he changed his assembly constituency to Paniyara as an SP candidate and lost. He finally won as gram Pradhan from his native village and in the Uttar Pradesh Elections 2007, he won from the Pipraich constituency with a 7% (6,000 vote) margin over the criminal-politician and liquor-baron Jitendra Jaiswal alias Pappu, erstwhile minister under Kalyan Singh of the Bharatiya Janata Party (BJP).

He was appointed Minister of Fisheries by BSP leader Mayawati.

== Murder of police constable ==
On the night of 8 June 2008, Nishad went in his official "red-beacon" car to the Kotwali police station in Maharajganj district, near Gorakhpur, demanding that the police pursue the perpetrators of a rape on a Dalit girl. The rape had occurred on 26 May, but the police resisted filing a First Information Report until 5 June. The girl testified to rape in court, but an initial medical report, contested by the Dalits, had determined that there was no rape. The police then downgraded the crime to eve-teasing and released the boy accused of the crime. However the Dalit community felt that the police were biased towards the perpetrator, and Nishad was there to protest.

At one stage, the group attempted to enter the strongroom in the police station, and constable Krishnanand Rai, a noted hockey player, was apparently preventing their entry. In the ensuing altercations, someone from Nishad's group fired three rounds, and two bullets hit constable Rai in the chest, killing him. This was part of an attempt to "ransack the police station and loot the armoury", according to Deputy Inspector General of Police, G L Meena.

=== Sacked from the ministry ===
Subsequently, Mayawati summoned Nishad for discussions and later dropped him from the ministry, while appointing a special medical board to investigate the rape charges. Nishad has denied that he went to the Kotwali police station at all, claiming that he had merely "called up some officials and asked them to probe the rape case," and that the violence was instigated by angry locals. However, police inspector GP Sharma has said that the minister had "barged into the premises" of the police station. Nishad's denial has been contradicted by Mayawati herself, who said: "Since the minister was present on the spot, I have asked him to resign. He will not be re-inducted (into the ministry) till the time the inquiry is completed."

Nishad could not be arrested until three days after the constable's death, since the concurrence of Mayawati was required. Nishad has six other cases of rioting and assault against him.

However, the cause Nishad was arguing at the police station appears to be viable. Two days later, the special medical board appointed by Mayawati reported that the girl had indeed been raped. Given the influence wielded by the Nishad caste, another Nishad politician, Dharmraj Nishad, was inducted as a full minister into the cabinet. The investigating police officer in the case, Munni Ram, was suspended.

Even at the time of his election, Jamuna Nishad had been identified as one of the many Criminal Politicians in Uttar Pradesh. He was the third minister to be dropped from the Mayawati cabinet on criminal grounds.

== Death ==
Nishad died in a road accident on 19 November 2010. His accident is still a conspiracy.

== Political Succession ==
His wife Rajmati Devi got elected in by-election of Pipraich Constituency from Samajwadi Party after his death. In 2012 again she got elected in Uttar Pradesh assembly Election from Samajwadi party, and in General Election 2014 she contested from Gorakhpur & got defeated by Yogi Adityanath. Now she is 2nd term MLA from same constituency. His daughter Manisha Nishad and son Amrendra Nishad are political successors of Nishad community. His son Amrendra Nishad is preparing for MLA from Pipraich Constituency and daughter Manisha Nishad is going for MP election from Gorakhpur.
