= Mandhata Singh =

Indian politician

Member of Parliament, Lok Sabha
- In office 1989–91
- Preceded by: Sheila Kaul
- Succeeded by: Atal Bihari Vajpayee
- Constituency: Lucknow

Personal details
- Born: 18 July 1923 Gahmar, United Provinces, British India(present-day Uttar Pradesh, India)
- Died: 23 September 2000 (aged 77)
- Party: Janata Dal
- Spouse: Saraswati Singh

Mandhata Singh (18 July 1923 – 23 September 2000) was an Indian politician. He was elected to the Lok Sabha, the lower house of the Parliament of India from the Lucknow constituency of Uttar Pradesh in 1989 as a member of the Janata Dal.
