= Pulin Behari Banerji =

Indian politician

Member of Parliament, Lok Sabha
- In office 1957–1962
- Succeeded by: B. K. Dhaon
- Constituency: Lucknow

Personal details
- Born: 1898 Lucknow, British India (present-day Uttar Pradesh, India)
- Party: Indian National Congress

Pulin Behari Banerji was an Indian politician. He was elected to the Lok Sabha, the lower house of the Parliament of India from the Lucknow constituency of Uttar Pradesh as a member of the Indian National Congress.
