= Abhishek Mishra =

Indian politician

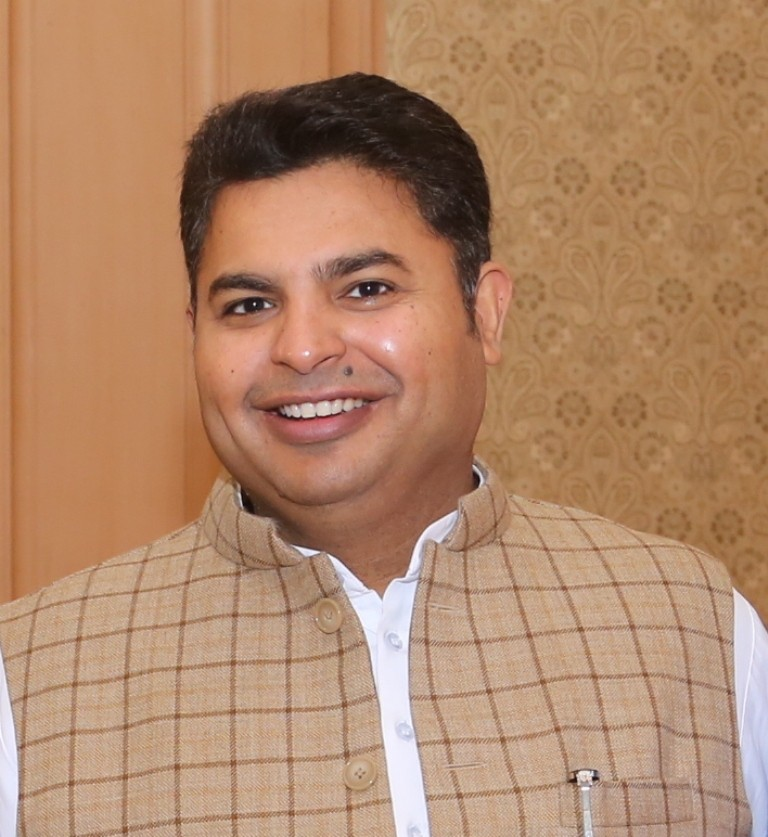

Abhishek Mishra (born 29 August 1977) is an Indian academic and politician, who is the National Secretary and Spokesperson of the Samajwadi Party. He is a former member of the legislative assembly of Uttar Pradesh, and a former Cabinet Minister.

Mishra has a MSc degree in management from the University of Strathclyde in Glasgow, and a PhD in strategy and marketing from the University of Cambridge. He has worked as a consultant for the Ministry of Home Affairs and the Ministry of Defence, and has trained IAS and IPS officers. He has also been a member of the faculty at the Indian Institute of Management Ahmedabad.

In the 2012 Uttar Pradesh Legislative Assembly election, he was elected for a five-year term, representing the Samajwadi Party in the sixteenth Legislative Assembly of Uttar Pradesh. For part of his term, he was a Cabinet Minister in Akhilesh Yadav's cabinet. He lost his seat in the 2017 election.
