= 2002 Uttar Pradesh Legislative Assembly election =

- February - March 2002

All 403 seats of the Uttar Pradesh Legislative Assembly 202 seats needed for a majority
- Turnout: 53.80% (▼1.93%)
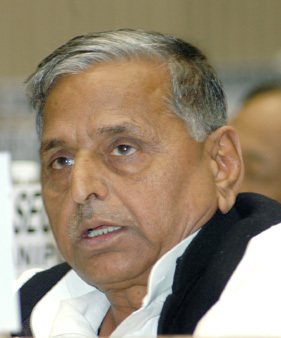

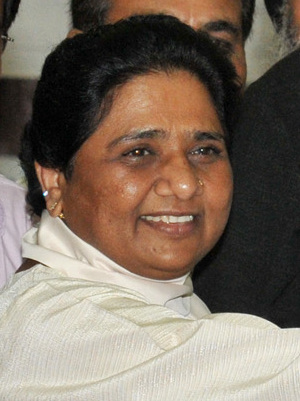

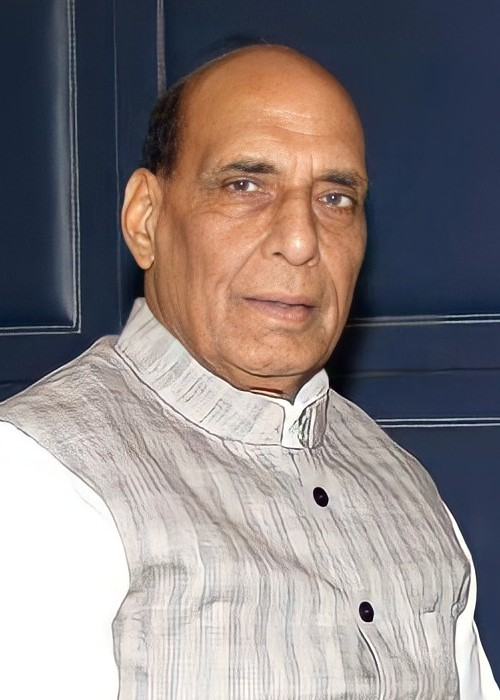

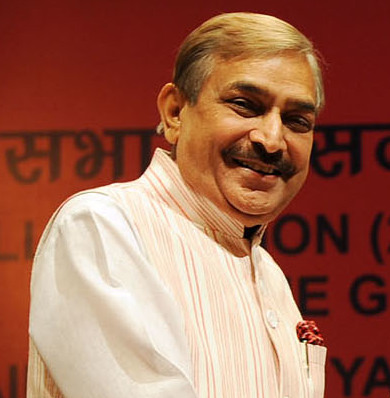

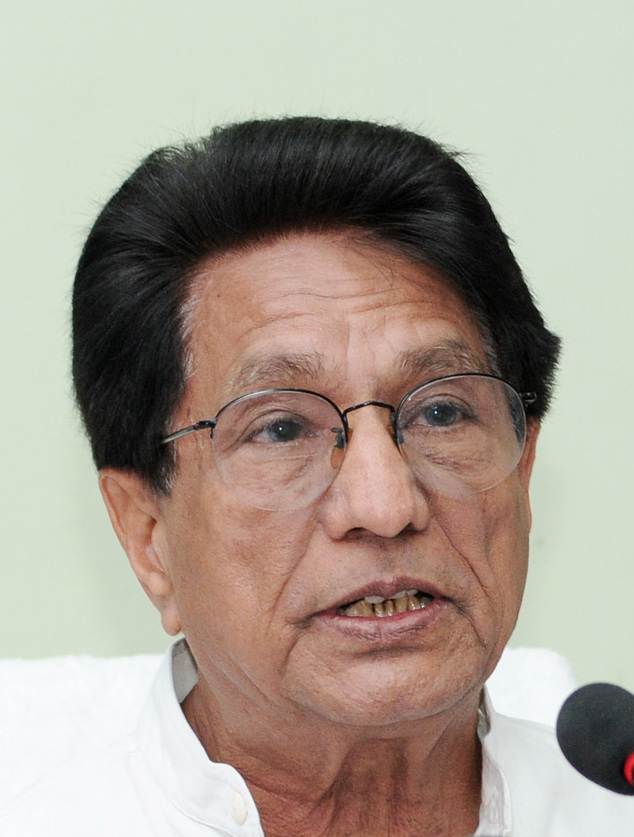

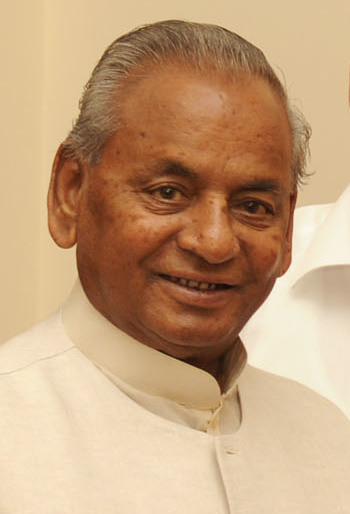
	Majority party	Minority party
Leader	Mulayam Singh Yadav	Mayawati
Party	SP	BSP
Leader's seat	Did not contest	Harora; Jahangirganj
Last election	107	65
Seats won	143	98
Seat change	▲36	▲33
Popular vote	13,612,509	12,374,388
Percentage	25.37%	23.06%
Swing	▲3.57%	▲3.42%
	Third party	Fourth party
Leader	Rajnath Singh	Pramod Tiwari
Party	BJP	INC
Alliance	NDA	-
Leader's seat	Haidergarh	Rampur Khas
Last election	151	31
Seats won	88	25
Seat change	▼63	▼6
Popular vote	10,776,078	4,810,231
Percentage	20.08%	8.96%
Swing	▼12.44%	▲0.61%
	Fifth party	Sixth party
Leader	Chaudhary Ajit Singh	Kalyan Singh
Party	RLD	RTKP
Leader's seat	Not Contested	Atrauli
Last election	New	New
Seats won	14	4
Seat change	New	New
Popular vote	1,332,810	1,812,535
Percentage	2.48%	3.38%
Swing	New	New
Chief Minister before election
Rajnath Singh
BJP
Elected Chief Minister
Mayawati
BSP

Elections to the Uttar Pradesh Legislative Assembly were held in 2002. Following a spell of 56 days of President's Rule from 3 March to 2 May 2002, Mayawati became Chief Minister on 3 May 2002 for the third time after the BJP extended support to the BSP. BJP state president Kalraj Mishra resigned, and was replaced by Vinay Katiyar, who thought up slogans like "Haathi nahin Ganesh hai, Brahma Vishnu Mahesh hai" to defend the alliance. But the problems kept mounting, and Mayawati resigned in August 2003.

On 29 August 2003, Mulayam Singh Yadav was sworn in as the Chief Minister with the support of BSP dissidents and ran the government until 2007. It is said that BJP leaders convinced Vajpayee that Yadav would help in the 2004 Lok Sabha elections — Mulayam did not, however, help, and while the NDA lost power at the centre. Some BJP leaders continue to believe that Mulayam would have been marginalised had he not been helped in 2003.

== Schedule ==
Assembly elections in Uttar Pradesh were held between 14 February and 21 February 2002.

On 26 December 2001,Election Commission of India announced the election schedule to the Legislative Assembly of Uttar Pradesh along with the other three state (Manipur, Punjab and Uttarakhand) which are due for an election.The Commission has decided to use EVMs in all the assembly constituencies in the States of Punjab, Uttaranchal and Uttar Pradesh.The entire election was scheduled into 3 phases.

- Phase 1 : 2002-02-14
- Phase 2 : 2002-02-18
- Phase 3 : 2002-02-21

Poll event	Phase		
Poll event	I	II	III
Notification date	16 January 2002		
Last date for filing nomination	23 January 2002		
Scrutiny of nomination	24 January 2002		
Last date for withdrawal of nomination	28 January 2002		
Date of poll	14 February 2002	18 February 2002	21 February 2002
Date of counting of votes	24 February 2002		

Phase
I (92 ACs, 15 Districts)	II (145 ACs, 27 Districts)	III (166 ACs, 27 Districts)
Bijnor; Moradabad; Rampur; Amroha; Budaun; Bareilly; Pilibhit; Shahjahanpur; Saharanpur; Muzaffarnagar; Meerut; Baghpat; Ghaziabad; Gautam Budh Nagar; Bulandshahr	Sitapur; Lakhimpur Kheri; Hardoi; Unnao; Lucknow; Fatehpur; Etawah; Auraiya; Kanpur Dehat; Kanpur Nagar; Farrukhabad; Kannauj; Jalaun; Jhansi; Lalitpur; Hamirpur; Mahoba; Banda; Chitrakoot; Firozabad; Etah; Mainpuri; Agra; Aligarh; Mathura; Hathras; Bahraich	Barabanki; Rae Bareli; Sultanpur; Pratapgarh; Ambedkar Nagar; Faizabad; Gonda; Basti; Sant Kabir Nagar; Balrampur; Siddharthnagar; Maharajganj; Gorakhpur; Kushinagar; Deoria; Ballia; Azamgarh; Mau; Kaushambi; Allahabad; Jaunpur; Ghazipur; Chandauli; Varanasi; Bhadohi; Mirzapur; Sonbhadra

== Parties and alliances ==
=== National Democratic Alliance ===
Party	Flag	Symbol	Leader	Seats contested
Bharatiya Janata Party			Rajnath Singh	320
Rashtriya Lok Dal			Chaudhary Ajit Singh	36+2
Janata Dal (United)			Sharad Yadav	13+3
Samata Party			George Fernandes	9
Lok Janshakti Party			Ramvilas Paswan	8+10
Shakti Dal				5+9
Akhil Bharatiya Loktantrik Congress			Naresh Chandra Agrawal	4+21

=== Indian National Congress ===
Party	Flag	Symbol	Leader	Seats contested
Indian National Congress			Sonia Gandhi	402

=== Samajwadi Alliance ===
Party	Flag	Symbol	Leader	Seats contested
Samajwadi Party			Mulayam Singh Yadav	390
Communist Party of India (Marxist)				6
Communist Party of India				5

=== Bahujan Samaj Party ===
Party	Flag	Symbol	Leader	Seats contested
Bahujan Samaj Party			Mayawati	401

== Results ==
=== Results by alliance and party ===
Party	SP	BSP	BJP	INC	IND	RLD	RKP	AD	ABLC	CPIM	JDU	ABHM	SJP	NLP	RPD
Seats	143	98	88	25	16	14	4	3	2	2	2	1	1	1	1
Alliance	SP+			NDA			BSP
Seats	145			106			98

Alliance	Party	Popular vote			Seats			
Alliance	Party	Votes	%	±pp	Contested	Won	FD	+/−
SP+	Samajwadi Party	13,612,509	25.73	▲4.93	390	143	68	▲33
SP+	Communist Party of India (Marxist)	163,462	0.3	▼0.37	6	2	3	▼2
SP+	Communist Party of India	69,548	0.13	▼0.46	5	0	4	▼1
NDA	Bharatiya Janata Party	10,776,078	20.08	▼12.44	320	88	50	▼86
NDA	Rashtriya Lok Dal	1,332,810	2.48	▲0.4	38	14	12	▲6
NDA	Janata Dal (United)	313,860	0.58	New entry	16	2	8	New entry
NDA	Akhil Bharatiya Loktantrik Congress	281608	0.52	New entry	25	2	19	New entry
NDA	Samata Party	212286	0.40	Steady	9	0	4	▼2
NDA	Lok Janshakti Party	319099	0.59	New entry	18	1	9	New entry
NDA	Shakti Dal	245954	0.46	New entry	14	0	11	New entry
UPA	Indian National Congress	4,810,231	8.96	▲0.61	402	25	334	▼8
None	Bahujan Samaj Party	12,374,388	23.06	▲3.42	401	98	91	▲31
None	Rashtriya Kranti Party	1,812,535	3.38	New entry	335	4	315	New entry
None	Apna Dal	1,161,145	2.16	▲1.39	227	3	216	▲3
None	Samajwadi Janata Party (Rashtriya)	130,536	0.24	▲0.35	21	1	20	Steady
None	Akhil Bharat Hindu Mahasabha	95,550	0.18	▲0.18	15	1	13	▲1
None	National Loktantrik Party	381,300	0.71	▲0.44	130	1	126	▲1
None	Rashtriya Parivartan Dal	234,289	0.44	New entry	61	1	58	New entry
None	Independents	4,113,743	7.67	▼1.15	2353	16	2318	▲3
None	Total	536,656,548	100					
Valid votes		536,565,548	99.99					
Invalid votes		3,688	0.01					
Votes cast/ turnout		53,668,674	53.80					
Abstentions		46,087,653	46.2					
Registered voters		99,756,327						

=== Results by constituency ===
Constituency		Winner				Runner Up				Margin	%
#	Name	Candidate	Party	Votes	%	Candidate	Party	Votes	%	Margin	%
Bijnor District
1	Seohara	Qutubddin	BSP	37,853	23.11	Ved Prakash Singh	BJP	35,704	21.80	2149	1.31
2	Dhampur	Mool Chand Chauhan	SP	56,957	36.63	Ashok Kumar Rana	RLD	46,044	29.80	10,553	6.83
3	Afzalgarh	Indra Dev Singh	BJP	41,532	24.76	Muhammad Gazi	BSP	40,805	24.33	727	0.43
4	Nagina(SC)	Omvati Devi	SP	42,684	31.66	Manoj Kumar Paras	BSP	40,553	30.08	2131	1.58
5	Nazibabad (SC)	Ram Swaroop Singh	CPI(M)	40,426	33.94	Sheesharam Singh	BSP	35,584	29.88	4842	4.07
6	Bijnor	Kuvar Bharatendra	BJP	52,195	35.17	Tasleem	SP	35,856	24.16	16339	11.01
7	Chandpur	Swami Omvesh	RLD	60,595	35.91	Ram Avtar Singh	BSP	49,928	29.59	10667	6.33
Amroha District
8	Amroha	Mehboob Ali	RPD	59,314	41.43	Hari Singh Dhillon	RLD	50,042	34.95	678	0.50
9	Hasanpur	Devendra Nagpal	IND	68,680	42.13	Vijay Pal	BSP	39,107	23.99	29573	18.14
10	Gangeshwari (SC)	Jagram	SP	49,371	35.61	Veer Singh	BSP	39,186	28.26	10185	7.35
Moradabad District
11	Kanth	Rizwan Ahmad Khan	BSP	48,011	34.99	Rajesh Kumar Singh	BJP	38,433	28.01	9578	6.98
12	Sambhal	Iqbal Mehmood	SP	52,562	36.13	Shafiqur Rahman Barq	RPD	31,256	21.49	21,306	14.65
13	Bahjoi	Aqeel-ur-rahman Khan	BSP	47,494	37.05	Brijendra Pal Singh	SP	33,387	26.04	14107	11.00
14	Chandausi (SC)	Gulab Devi	BJP	40,228	34.09	Satish Premi	SP	39,588	33.5	700	0.59
15	Kunderki	Mohammad Rizwan	SP	41,356	35.01	Rishipal Singh	BJP	50,626	23.27	17882	11.73
16	Moradabad West	Mohd. Aqil	BSP	38,425	28.51	Samarpal Singh	SP	30,089	22.33	8336	6.19
17	Moradabad Nagar	Sandeep Agrawal	BJP	42,888	42.21	Mohd. Siddiq	INC	27,907	27.46	14981	14.73
18	Moradabad Rural	Shamimul Haq	INC	52,367	34.97	Saulat Ali	SP	37,450	25.01	14917	9.96
19	Thakurdwara	Kuwar Sarvesh Singh	BJP	87,318	45.74	Mohd. Ullah KHan	INC	84,063	44.04	3255	1.71
Rampur District
20	Suar Tanda	Nawab Kazim Ali	INC	83,135	43.72	Shiv Bahadur Saxena	BJP	56,125	29.52	27010	14.2
21	Rampur	Mohd. Azam Khan	SP	73,920	58.28	Afroz Ali Khan	INC	35929	28.33	37991	29.95
22	Bilaspur	Beena Bhardwaj	SP	56,179	32.94	Sanjay Kapoor	INC	35,769	20.97	20410	11.97
23	Shahabad (SC)	Kashi Ram	SP	59,856	41.03	Chandrapal Singh	BJP	47,604	32.63	12252	8.40
Budaun District
24	Bisauli	Yogendra Kumar Kunnu	SP	37,980	29.1	Vikas Yadav	RPD	35,729	27.38	2251	1.72
25	Gunnaur	Ajit Kumar	JDU	46,998	36.31	Ram Khiladi	SP	41,817	32.31	5181	4.0
26	Sahaswan	Omkar Singh Yadav	SP	57,050	46.86	Dhram Pal Yadav	JDU	43,720	35.91	13330	10.95
27	Bilsi (SC)	Ashutosh Maurya	SP	45,895	38.76	Amit Mathuria	BJP	33,859	28.60	12036	10.71
28	Budaun	Vimal Krishan Agrawal	BSP	36,148	27.73	Jugendra Aneja	SP	32,834	25.18	3314	2.54
29	Usehat	Ashish Yadav	SP	40,550	30.49	Muslim Khan	BSP	32,152	24.18	8398	6.32
30	Binawar	Bhupendra Singh	BSP	33,484	25.05	Suresh Pal Singh	SP	29,582	22.13	3902	2.92
31	Dataganj	Prem Pal Singh Yadav	SP	27,331	23.61	Avinash Singh	BJP	25,710	22.21	1621	1.4
Bareilly District
32	Aonla	Dharmpal Singh	BJP	43,345	33.15	Shyam Bihari Singh	SP	43,082	32.95	263	0.2
33	Sunha	Dharmendra Kumar	BSP	31,502	25.91	Veer Pal Yadav	SP	28,733	23.64	2769	2.28
34	Faridpur (SC)	Siyaram Sagar	SP	39,106	35.20	Vijay Pal Singh	BJP	38,868	34.99	238	0.21
35	Bareilly Cantonment	Shazil Islam Ansari	IND	35,493	27.38	Praveen Singh Aron	INC	26,703	20.59	8790	6.78
36	Bareilly City	Rajesh Agarwal	BJP	36,950	39.61	Ravi Prakash Agarwal	SP	23,976	25.7	12974	13.91
37	Nawabganj	Bhagwat Saran Gangwar	SP	63,913	46.87	M.P. Arya	BJP	35,008	25.67	28905	21.20
38	Bhojipura	Virendra Singh	SP	42,761	29.89	Abdul Kadir	BSP	36,386	25.44	6375	4.46
39	Kawar	Sultan Beg	SP	40,971	30.27	Jaideep Singh Barar	BSP	38,064	28.12	2907	2.15
40	Baheri	Manzoor Ahmad	SP	39,611	24.48	Ata ul Rehman	BSP	36,728	22.7	2883	1.78
Pilibhit District
41	Pilibhit	Riaz Ahmad	SP	35,700	29.03	B.K. Gupta	BJP	25,719	20.92	9971	8.11
42	Barkhera (SC)	Peetam Ram	SP	37,076	31.87	Kishan Lal	RTKP	22,851	19.64	14225	12.23
43	Bisalpur	Anis Ahmad Khan	BSP	32,266	24.24	Tejbahadur Gangwar	RTKP	24,603	18.49	7663	5.76
44	Puranpur	Vinod Tiwari	BJP	43,058	26.48	Gopal Krishnan	SP	34,502	21.22	8556	5.26
Shahjahanpur District
45	Powayan (SC)	Mithlesh	IND	31,816	20.86	Hiralal	SP	29,972	19.65	1844	1.21
46	Nigohi	Kovid Kumar	BJP	48,131	34.93	Chandra Sen	BSP	47,235	34.28	896	0.65
47	Tilhar	Virendra Pratap Singh	INC	45,491	35.96	Rajesh Yadav	SP	44,133	34.88	1358	1.07
48	Jalalabad	Sharad Vir Singh	SP	43,572	31.12	Krishnapal Singh	BSP	27,511	19.65	16601	11.47
49	Dadraul	Avadhesh Kumar Verma	BSP	34,925	25.62	Anwar Ali	SP	30,534	22.4	4391	3.22
50	Shahjahanpur	Suresh Kumar Khanna	BJP	68,454	47.9	Pradeep Pandey	SP	45,417	31.78	23037	16.12
Lakhimpur Kheri District
51	Mohamdi (SC)	Banshidhar Raj	SP	57,525	35.79	Krishna Devi	BJP	55,610	34.60	1915	1.19
52	Haiderabad	Arvind Giri	SP	62,587	39.03	Arun Kumar Verma	BSP	47,974	29.94	14553	9.08
53	Paila (SC)	Rajesh Kumar	BSP	36,005	27.39	Motilal	SP	30,721	23.37	5284	4.02
54	Lakhimpur	Kaushal Kishore	SP	47,558	35.4	Gyan Prakesh Bajpai	SD	40,977	30.46	6581	4.9
55	Sri Nagar	Mayawati	BSP	41,735	28.92	Dheerendra Bahadur Singh	SP	37,273	25.82	4462	3.09
56	Nighasan	R. S. Kushwaha	BSP	44,367	26.18	Krishna Gopal Patel	SP	39,981	23.59	5284	4.02
57	Dhaurehra	Yashpal Chaudhari	SP	54,507	33.61	Bala Prasad Awasthi	BSP	46,274	28.54	8223	5.08
Sitapur District
58	Behta	Mahendra Kumar Singh	SP	51,105	36.08	Zufar Ahmad Farooqui	BSP	36,815	25.99	14290	10.09
59	Biswan	Rampal Yadav	SP	40,809	29.85	Ajit Mehrotra	BJP	35,172	25.72	5637	4.12
60	Mahmudabad	Narendra Singh Verma	BJP	49,191	32.33	Narendra Mishra	SP	35,057	23.04	14,134	9.29
61	Sidhauli (SC)	Shyam Lal Rawat	SP	46,771	34.26	Ramesh Rahi	BSP	46,335	33.94	436	0.32
62	Laharpur	Anil Kumar Verma	SP	43,112	32.02	Haji Jalish Ahmed	BSP	42,771	31.77	341	0.25
63	Sitapur	Radhey Shyam Jaisawal	SP	54,808	44.05	Rajendra Kumar Gupta	BJP	34,878	28.03	19930	16.02
64	Hargaon (SC)	Ramhet Bharti	BSP	35,924	30.67	Daulat Ram	SP	35,873	30.62	51	0.04
65	Misrikh	Om Prakash	SP	53,900	40.89	Rakesh Singh	BSP	35,379	26.80	18611	14.1
66	Machhrehta (SC)	Ram Krishana	BSP	48,384	43.61	Ram Pal Rajvanshi	LJNSP	24,824	22.37	23560	21.23
Hardoi District
67	Beniganj (SC)	Satya Narain	BSP	37,530	35.13	Ram Pal Verma	SP	33,630	31.48	3900	3.56
68	Sandila	Abdul Mannan	BSP	52,852	41.48	Virendra Singh	SP	33,292	26.13	19560	15.35
69	Ahirori (SC)	Usha Verma	SP	47,799	42.55	Shyam Prakash	BSP	43,719	38.92	4080	3.63
70	Hardoi	Naresh Chandra Agarwal	SP	63,825	48.72	Shiv Prasad	BSP	37,242	28.43	26583	20.29
71	Bawan (SC)	Anil Kumar Verma	BJP	47,803	40.2	Rajeswari	SP	37,589	31.61	10214	8.59
72	Pihani	Ashok Bajpai	SP	49,838	40.54	Khalid Gauri	BSP	44,407	36.12	5431	4.42
73	Shahabad	Ganga Bhakt Singh	BJP	41,602	30.4	Babu Khan	SP	35,252	25.76	6350	4.64
74	Bilgram	Vishram Singh Yadav	SP	42,151	28.58	Ganga Singh Chauhan	BJP	27,003	18.31	15148	10.27
75	Mallawan	Krishna Kumar Singh	BSP	37,220	25.72	Brijesh Pathak	INC	37,090	25.63	130	0.09
Unnao District
76	Bangarmau	Ram Shankar Pal	BSP	43,934	32.03	Ashok Singh	SP	38,236	27.88	5698	4.15
77	Safipur (SC)	Sundar Lal	SP	40,005	32.23	Ram Baran	BSP	30,182	24.32	9823	7.91
78	Unnao	Kuldeep Singh Sengar	BSP	32,072	24.71	Shiv Pal Singh	INC	28,494	21.95	3578	2.76
79	Hadha	Ganga Bux Singh	BJP	36,524	29.42	Sundar Lal Lodhi	SP	34,722	27.97	1820	1.45
80	Bhagwantnagar	Nattho Singh	BSP	54,104	42.0	Kripa Shankar Singh	BJP	30,627	23.78	23477	18.23
81	Purwa	Uday Raj	SP	48,831	35.18	Hirday Narayan Dixit	BJP	38,914	28.04	9917	7.15
82	Hasanganj (SC)	Mastram	BJP	37,421	30.12	Rakesh	BSP	34,817	28.02	2604	2.10
Lucknow District
83	Malihabad (SC)	Kaushal Kishore	IND	62,571	47.37	Gauri Shankar	SP	37,060	28.04	25535	19.33
84	Mahona	Rajendra Prasad	SP	73,398	37.7	Gomti Yadav	BJP	58,068	29.83	15530	7.87
85	Lucknow East	Vidya Sagar Gupta	BJP	23,429	33.31	Ravidas Mehrotra	SP	23,090	32.82	339	0.48
86	Lucknow West	Lalji Tandon	BJP	57,628	46.04	Virendra Bhatia	SP	43,089	34.43	14539	11.62
87	Lucknow Central	Suresh Kumar Srivastava	BJP	37,388	38.94	Banwarelal Kanchal	SP	25,473	26.53	11915	12.41
88	Lucknow Cantonment	Suresh Chandra Tiwari	BJP	36,473	40.52	Sharda Pratap Shukla	SP	21,126	23.47	15347	17.05
89	Sarojininagar	Mohd. Irshad Khan	BSP	48,276	32.62	Shyam Kishore Yadav	SP	45,684	30.87	2592	1.75
90	Mohanlalganj (SC)	R. K. Chaudhary	IND	56,744	45.73	R.P. Saroj	SP	32,076	25.85	24668	19.88
Raebareli District
91	Bachhrawan (SC)	Ram Lal Akela	SP	53,982	42.35	Shyam Sunder Bharti	BSP	24,372	19.12	29610	23.23
92	Tiloi	Mayankeshwar Sharan Singh	BJP	33,579	24.74	Dr. Mohammad Muslim	INC	32,593	24.02	986	0.73
93	Rae Bareli	Akhilesh Kumar Singh	INC	1,15,869	74.18	Rajeev Kumar	SP	20,032	12.83	95837	61.36
94	Sataon	Surendra Singh	BSP	38,632	29.84	Ram Naresh Yadav	SP	31,292	24.17	7340	5.67
95	Sareni	Devendra Pratap Singh	SP	32,837	25.75	Ashok Kumar Singh	INC	26,593	20.86	6244	4.90
96	Dalmau	Swami Prasad Maurya	BSP	42,723	27.95	Ajay Pal Singh	BJP	42,552	27.84	171	0.11
97	Salon (SC)	Asha Kishor	SP	36,536	28.29	Shiv Balak Pasi	INC	32,509	25.17	4027	3.12
Pratapgarh District
98	Kunda	Raghuraj Pratap Singh	IND	88,446	82.13	Mohd. Sami	SP	6768	6.28	81678	75.85
99	Bihar (SC)	Ramnath	IND	88,378	72.28	Keshav	SP	19,011	15.55	69367	56.73
100	Rampur Khas	Pramod Tiwari	INC	82,415	61.48	Pushpa Devi	AD	21,379	15.95	61036	45.53
101	Gadwara	Raja Ram	LJNSP	25,876	22.02	Ajit Pratap Singh	BSP	23,273	19.81	2603	2.22
102	Pratapgarh	Hari Pratap Singh	BJP	33,067	26.09	Abdul Salam	AD	30,596	24.14	2471	1.95
103	Birapur	Shiva Kant Ojha	BJP	58,249	40.31	Laxmi Narayan Pandey	SP	32,965	22.81	25284	17.5
104	Patti	Rajendra Pratap Singh	BJP	65,265	42.48	Mritunjay	BSP	44,501	28.97	20764	13.52
Sultanpur District
105	Amethi	Amita Singh	BJP	55,949	42.23	Ashish	INC	37,184	28.06	18765	14.16
106	Gauriganj	Noor Mohammad	INC	29,944	22.71	Chandra Prakash	BJP	29,677	22.51	267	0.20
107	Jagdishpur (SC)	Ram Sewak	INC	36,640	33.04	Nandlal	SP	28,221	25.45	8419	7.59
108	Issauli	Chandra Bhadra Singh	SP	53,270	43.41	Kamil Farokh	BSP	27,709	22.58	25561	20.83
109	Sultanpur	Om Prakash Pandey	BJP	29,126	22.48	Mohd. Ahmad	INC	23,940	18.47	5186	4.0
110	Jaisinghpur	Om Prakash Singh	BSP	31,963	23.32	Jainarayan Tiwari	INC	25,198	18.39	6765	4.94
111	Chanda	Anil Kumar Pandey	SP	36,078	26.39	Ram Shiromani Verma	BSP	34,631	25.33	1447	1.06
112	Kadipur (SC)	Bhagelu Ram	BSP	39,536	26.76	Kashinath	BJP	33,079	22.39	6457	4.37
Ambedkar Nagar District
113	Katehari	Dharmraj Nishad	BSP	52,213	38.44	Jai Shanker Pandey	SP	49,092	35.46	4121	2.98
114	Akbarpur	Ram Achal Rajbhar	BSP	54,617	38.46	Pawan Kumar Pandey	LJNSP	47,077	30.05	7540	4.81
115	Jalalpur	Rakesh Pandey	SP	52,575	34.15	Kamar Hayat	BSP	47,524	30.87	5051	3.28
116	Jahangirganj (SC)	Mayawati	BSP	51,004	35.56	Bhim Prasad Sonkar	SP	44,597	31.10	6407	4.47
117	Tanda	Lalji Verma	BSP	67,376	45.02	Azimul Huqe Pahalwan	SP	56,887	38.01	10489	7.01
Faizabad District
118	Ayodhya	Lallu Singh	BJP	51,289	38.72	Abhay Singh	BSP	33,429	25.24	17860	13.48
119	Bikapur	Sita Ram Nishad	SP	43,589	32.39	Jitendra Kumar Bablu	BSP	37,066	27.29	6923	5.10
120	Milkipur	Anand Sen Yadav	BSP	54,545	40.06	Dinesh Pratap Singh	BJP	51,459	37.79	3086	2.27
121	Sohawal (SC)	Awadhesh Prasad	SP	43,398	35.36	Ramu Priyadarshi	BSP	35,242	28.82	8156	6.65
Barabanki District
122	Rudauli	Abbas Ali Zaidi	SP	51,464	40.22	Ahat Ram Ali	BSP	30483	23.82	3,673	2.92
123	Dariyabad	Rajeev Kumar Singh	BJP	43,496	33.29	Vivekanand	SP	36,167	27.68	17860	13.48
124	Siddhaur (SC)	Kamla Rawat	BSP	41,966	33.63	Usha Rawat	SP	35,977	28.81	6019	4.82
125	Haidergarh	Rajnath Singh	BJP	70,093	52.65	Arvind Singh	SP	45,537	33.64	25636	19.01
126	Masauli	Rakesh Kumar Verma	SP	63,418	44.19	Fareed Mahfooz Kidwai	IND	59,021	41.13	4397	3.06
127	Nawabganj	Chhotey Lal Yadav	SP	44,874	31.69	Sangram Singh	BJP	44,847	31.67	27	0.02
128	Fatehpur (SC)	Raj Rani	BJP	47,881	36.66	Hardev Singh	SP	34,865	26.69	13016	9.97
129	Ramnagar	Rajlaxmi Verma	BJP	34,009	26.58	Virendra Shukla	BSP	22,922	17.91	11087	8.67
Bahraich District
130	Kaiserganj	Mukut Bihari Verma	BJP	39,355	33.27	Gulam Mhd. Khan	BSP	35,641	30.13	3714	3.14
131	Fakharpur	Arun Veer Singh	SP	58,059	41.59	Mayankar Singh	BJP	56,721	40.63	1338	0.96
132	Mahsi	Ali Akbar	BSP	52,173	36.96	Dileep Kumar	SP	44,973	31.86	7200	5.10
133	Nanpara	Jata Shanker Singh	BJP	59,932	36.84	Waris Ali	BSP	58,177	35.76	1755	1.08
134	Charda (SC)	Shabbir Ahmad	SP	46,927	38.65	Savitri Phoole	BJP	31,437	25.59	15490	12.76
135	Bhinga	Chandramani Kant Singh	BJP	36,588	30.23	Mohammad Aslam	BSP	34,603	28.59	1985	1.64
136	Bahraich	Waqar Ahmad Shah	SP	55,232	39.19	Subhash Tripathi	BSP	41,137	29.19	14095	10.00
137	Ikauna (SC)	Akshaibar Lal	BJP	45,878	38.91	Veerendra Pasi	SP	38,242	32.43	7636	6.48
Balrampur District
138	Gainsari	Shiv Pratap Yadav	SP	48,740	35.40	Bindu Lal	BJP	37,045	26.91	11695	8.59
139	Tulsipur	Abdul Mashhood Khan	SP	47,817	34.83	Kamlesh Singh	IND	45,421	33.08	2396	1.75
140	Balrampur	Geeta Singh	SP	33,310	27.29	Hanumant Singh	BJP	31,085	25.47	2226	1.82
141	Utraula	Anwar Mahmood Khan	SP	40,384	32.11	Shyamlal	BJP	39,253	31.21	1131	0.09
Gonda District
142	Sadullanagar	Ram Pratap Singh	BJP	47,257	33.91	Mohd. Umar	SP	39,074	28.04	8183	5.87
143	Mankapur (SC)	Ram Bishun Azad	SP	52,515	42.03	Sumitra Devi	BJP	30,109	24.10	22406	17.93
144	Mujehna	Ghanshyam Shukla	BJP	60,575	44.39	Ram Pal Singh	SP	37,819	27.72	22756	16.68
145	Gonda	Vinod Kumar	SP	47,299	40.36	Tulsidas Rai	BJP	34,788	29.68	12511	10.67
146	Katra Bazar	Baij Nath Dubey	SP	48,677	38.23	Bavan Singh	BJP	46,205	36.29	2462	1.93
147	Colonelganj	Yogesh Pratap Singh	BSP	46,445	36.37	Ajay Pratap Singh	BJP	42,278	33.10	4167	3.26
148	Dixir (SC)	Babulal	SP	44,398	39.62	Ramapati Shastri	BJP	37,758	33.69	6640	5.93
Basti District
149	Harraiya	Raj Kishore Singh	BSP	34,454	25.18	Anil Singh	SP	33,028	24.14	1426	1.04
150	Captainganj	Ram Prasad Chaudhary	BJP	40,415	26.90	Mahesh Singh	SP	36,386	24.22	4029	2.68
151	Nagar East (SC)	Ram Karan Arya	SP	39,730	30.87	Doodhram	BSP	33,629	26.13	6101	4.74
152	Basti	Jagdambika Pal	INC	42,078	31.10	Jeetendra Kumar	BJP	32,564	24.07	9515	7.03
153	Ramnagar	Anoop Pandey	SP	49,001	37.97	Ram Lalit Chaudhary	BSP	34,727	26.91	14274	11.06
Siddharthnagar District
154	Domariaganj	Kamal Yusuf Malik	SP	44,404	32.32	Prem Prakash	BJP	36,781	26.77	7623	5.55
155	Itwa	Mata Prasad Pandey	SP	47,548	35.36	Mohd. Muqueem	INC	37,447	27.85	10101	7.53
156	Shohratgarh	Dinesh Singh	INC	35,738	26.6	Ravindra Pratap Chaudhari	SP	30,152	22.44	5586	4.16
157	Naugarh	Aneel	SP	34,907	25.39	Swarath Prasad	BSP	24,636	17.92	10271	7.47
158	Bansi	Jai Pratap Singh	BJP	43,961	34.36	Lal Ji Yadav	SP	41,508	32.44	2453	1.92
Sant Kabir Nagar District
159	Khesraha	Aditya Vikram Singh	SP	43,138	31.24	Diwakar Vikram Singh	BJP	30,261	21.91	12877	9.32
160	Menhdawal	Abdul Kalam	SP	40,143	31.1	Lalchandra Nishad	BSP	29,086	22.54	11057	8.57
161	Khalilabad (SC)	Dawarika Prasad	BJP	39,840	31.66	Ram Lakhan	SP	35,547	28.25	4293	3.41
162	Hainsarbazar (SC)	Sankhlal Manjhi	JDU	41,830	31.46	Dasharath Prasad	SP	37,640	28.31	4190	3.15
Gorakhpur District
163	Bansgaon (SC)	Sadal Prasad	BSP	59,525	46.9	Sant Prasad	BJP	37,786	29.77	21739	17.13
164	Dhuriapar	Jai Prakash Nishad	BSP	36,426	27.42	Rajendra Singh	NLP	24,769	18.64	11657	8.77
165	Chillupar	Harishankar Tiwari	ABLTC	61,489	46.18	Rajesh Tripathi	BSP	46,538	34.95	14951	11.23
166	Kauriram	Ram Bhuwal	BSP	40,518	29.79	Ambika	SP	39,949	29.37	569	0.42
167	Mundera Bazar (SC)	Sharada Devi	SP	31,962	26.7	Madho Prasad	BSP	28,623	23.91	3339	2.79
168	Pipraich	Jitendra Kumar	IND	53,729	40.42	Deepak Agarwal	ABHM	31,494	23.69	22235	16.73
169	Gorakhpur	Radha Mohan Das Agarwal	ABHM	38,830	39.29	Pramod Tekriwal	SP	20,382	20.62	18848	18.67
170	Maniram	Kamlesh Paswan	SP	62,918	46.16	Vijay Bahadur Yadav	BJP	44,862	32.91	18056	13.25
171	Sahjanwa	Dev Narain	BSP	52,102	39.05	Yashpal Singh Ravat	SP	38,232	28.65	13870	10.4
Maharajganj District
172	Paniara	Fateh Bahadur Singh	BJP	41,676	29.05	Badri Prasad	IND	39,505	27.54	2171	1.51
173	Pharenda	Shyam Narain	INC	31,395	23.79	Virendra Chaudhary	BSP	25,522	19.34	5873	4.45
174	Lakshmipur	Amarmani Tripathi	BSP	63,348	42.4	Kaushal Kishore	SP	57,348	38.38	6000	4.02
175	Siswa	Shivendra Singh	BJP	57,350	38.87	Avnindra Nath Dwedi	SP	49,722	33.7	7628	5.17
176	Maharajganj (SC)	Chandra Kishore	BJP	42,994	29.68	Sudama Prasad	INC	34,479	23.81	8515	5.88
177	Shyam Deurwa	Gyanendra Singh	BJP	42,175	29.7	Mehdi Hasan	BSP	40,456	28.49	1719	1.21
Kushinagar District
178	Naurangia (SC)	Purnamasi Dehati	SP	39,845	29.87	Shivnarayan	BJP	37,045	27.77	2800	2.1
179	Ramkola	Radheshyam Singh	SP	62,099	41.89	Ajimul Haq	BSP	39,744	26.81	22355	15.08
180	Hata (SC)	Ramapati	BJP	45,447	33.08	Shrinath	BSP	27,145	19.76	18302	13.32
181	Padrauna	Ratanjit Pratap Narain Singh	INC	50,388	32.65	Baleshwar Yadav	SP	35,006	22.68	15382	9.97
182	Seorahi	Dr. P.K. Rai	SP	36,107	25.12	Nand Kishor Mishra	BJP	35,642	24.8	465	0.32
183	Fazilnagar	Jagadish	BJP	44,432	29.22	Vishva Nath	SP	42,538	27.98	1874	1.23
Deoria District
184	Kasia	Brahma Shankar	SP	80,752	49.82	Surya Pratap Shahi	BJP	55,867	34.46	24885	15.35
185	Gauri Bazar	Shakir Ali	SP	50,870	33.61	Janmejai Singh	BSP	44,744	29.57	6126	4.05
186	Rudrapur	Anugrah Narain	SP	41,095	32.45	Jai Prakash Nishad	BJP	27,417	21.65	13678	10.8
187	Deoria	Dinanath Kushwaha	NLP	35,159	25.19	Ram Nagina Yadav	SP	33,255	23.83	1904	1.36
188	Bhatpar Rani	Kameshwar Upadhyay	INC	39,618	28.23	Harivansh Sahay	SP	23,220	16.54	16398	11.68
189	Salempur	Fasiha Murad Lari	BSP	41,524	32.49	Shanti Yadav	SP	37,490	29.33	4034	3.16
190	Barhaj	Durga Prasad Misra	IND	30,845	24.77	Ram Prasad Jaisawal	BSP	27,601	22.17	3244	2.61
Mau District
191	Natthupur	Kapildeo	BSP	31,278	24.53	Utpal	SP	28,420	22.29	2858	2.24
192	Ghosi	Phagu Chauhan	BJP	45,873	33.17	Sudhakar Singh	SP	38,187	27.61	7686	5.56
Azamgarh District
193	Sagri	Malik Masood	BSP	48,895	34.83	Ram Pyare Singh	SP	48,255	34.37	640	0.46
194	Gopalpur	Waseem	SP	38,109	32.02	Reyaz Khan	BSP	32,356	27.19	5753	4.83
195	Azamgarh	Durga Prasad Yadav	SP	55,586	43.55	R.P. Rai	BSP	37,420	29.32	18166	14.23
196	Nizamabad	Alam Badi	SP	41,404	30.43	Kalamuddin	BSP	36,448	26.78	4956	3.64
197	Atraulia	Balram Yadav	SP	51,665	36.79	Vijay Prakash Singh	BSP	29,609	21.06	22056	15.71
198	Phulpur	Ram Naresh Yadav	INC	44,560	33.71	Ram Kishun	BSP	40,732	30.82	3828	2.9
199	Saraimir (SC)	Hira Lal Gautam	BSP	44,021	33.95	Daroga Prasad Saroj	SP	36,634	28.25	7387	5.7
200	Mehnagar (SC)	Vidya Chaudhary	BSP	37,785	27.21	Kalpnath Paswan	BJP	37,453	26.97	332	0.24
201	Lalganj	Sukhdev Rajbhar	BSP	53,700	34.68	Narendra Singh	BJP	51,952	33.55	1748	1.13
202	Mubarakpur	Chandradeo	BSP	53,853	33.59	Ram Darshan	LJNSP	44,607	27.8	9276	5.78
Mau District
203	Mhd. Gohna (SC)	Baijnath	SP	52,447	37.19	Banwari	BSP	51,518	36.54	929	0.66
204	Mau	Mukhtar Ansari	IND	70,687	46.06	Sita	SAP	37,645	24.53	33042	21.53
Ballia District
205	Rasra (SC)	Ghoora Ram	BSP	48,396	40.3	Ghura	SP	38,378	31.96	10018	8.34
206	Siar	Sharda Nand Anchal	SP	45,251	35.74	Sakaldip	BJP	34,739	27.43	10512	8.3
207	Chilkahar	Ram Ikabal	BJP	41,434	31.25	Sangram Singh	SP	29,758	22.44	11676	8.81
208	Sikandarpur	Ziaudin Rizwi	SP	36,907	28.18	Rajdhari	SAP	29,544	22.55	7363	5.62
209	Bansdih	Ram Govind Chaudhary	SJPR	43,098	31.47	Bacha Pathak	ABLTC	37,279	27.22	5819	4.25
210	Doaba	Bharat	BJP	38,411	34.02	Vikrama	SP	33,555	29.72	4856	4.3
211	Ballia	Narad Rai	SP	40,460	32.61	Ramji	BSP	27,472	22.14	12988	10.47
212	Kopachit	Ambika Chaudhary	SP	40,040	31.19	Sugreev Singh	BSP	31,789	24.76	8251	6.43
Ghazipur District
213	Zahoorabad	Kalicharan	BSP	56,504	37.13	Shivpujan	SP	50,281	33.04	6223	4.09
214	Mohammadabad	Krishnanand Rai	BJP	61,049	39.55	Afzal Ansari	SP	53,277	34.52	7772	5.04
215	Dildarnagar	Omprakash	SP	56,914	37.98	Aslam	BSP	38,823	25.91	18091	12.07
216	Zamania	Kailash	SP	50,379	33.83	Aroon	BJP	42,091	28.26	8288	5.56
217	Ghazipur	Umashankar Kushwaha	BSP	43,920	29.78	Rajendra	CPI	43,204	29.29	716	0.49
218	Jakhania (SC)	Chhediram	SP	51,986	36.47	Vijay Kumar	BSP	45,151	31.68	6835	4.8
219	Sadat (SC)	Biju Patnayak	SP	62,937	44.92	Ramdhani	BSP	55,128	39.35	7809	5.57
Chandauli District
220	Dhanapur	Prabhu Narayan	SP	47,410	35.26	Sushil Kumar	BSP	47,384	35.24	26	0.02
221	Chandauli (SC)	Sharada Prasad	BSP	45,706	31.32	Ujagir	SP	40,232	27.58	5474	3.75
222	Chakia (SC)	Shivtapasya Paswan	BJP	46,346	30.97	Satya Prakash Sonker	SP	43,596	29.13	2750	1.84
223	Mughalsarai	Ram Kishun	SP	49,697	34.06	Chhabbu	BJP	37,653	25.81	12044	8.25
Varanasi District
224	Saidpur	Kailash Nath Singh Yadav	BSP	63,069	37.37	Dinanath Pandey	SP	44,646	26.46	18423	10.92
225	Varanasi Cantonment	Harish Chandra Srivastava	BJP	41,426	31.04	Manoj Rai Pappu	SP	28,729	21.53	12697	9.51
226	Varanasi South	Shyamdev Roy Chaudhari	BJP	43,458	52.63	Rakesh Jain	SP	22,653	27.44	20805	25.2
227	Varanasi North	Abdul Kalam	SP	56,805	52.54	Ravindra Jaiswal	BJP	37,268	34.47	19537	18.07
228	Chiraigaon	Ramjit Rajbhar	SP	39,678	23.80	Birendra Singh	ABLTC	30,972	18.58	8706	5.22
229	Kolasla	Ajay Rai	BJP	56,454	37.54	Avadhesh Singh	BSP	41,186	27.38	15268	10.15
230	Gangapur	Surendra Singh Patel	AD	48,171	28.46	Kamala Rajbhar	AD	30,138	17.81	18033	10.66
Bhadohi District

Constituency	Reserved for (SC/None)	Member	Party
Aurai	None	Uday Bhan Singh	Bahujan Samaj Party
Gyanpur	None	Vijay Kumar Mishra	Samajwadi Party
Bhadohi	SC	Deenanath Bhaskar	Samajwadi Party
Barsathi	None	Shachindra Nath Tripathi	Samajwadi Party
Mariahu	None	Paras Nath Yadav	Samajwadi Party
Kerakat	SC	Somaru Ram Saroj	Bharatiya Janata Party
Beyalsi	None	Jagdish Narayan (rai)	Bahujan Samaj Party
Jaunpur	None	Surendra Pratap	Bharatiya Janata Party
Rari	None	Dhananjay Singh	Independent
Shahganj	SC	Jagdis Sonkar	Samajwadi Party
Khutahan	None	Shailendra Yadav "lalai"	Bahujan Samaj Party
Garwara	None	Lal Bahadur	Samajwadi Party
Machhlishahr	None	Vinod Kumar Singh	Bahujan Samaj Party
Dudhi	SC	Vijay Singh	Samajwadi Party
Robertsganj	SC	Parmeshwar	Samajwadi Party
Rajgarh	None	Anil Kumar Maurya	Bahujan Samaj Party
Chunar	None	Om Prakash Singh	Bharatiya Janata Party
Majhwa	None	Dr. Ramesh Chand Vind	Bahujan Samaj Party
Mirzapur	None	Kailash Chaurasiya	Samajwadi Party
Chhanvey	SC	Pakauri Lal	Bahujan Samaj Party
Meja	SC	Ram Kripal	Communist Party of India
Karchana	None	Rewati Raman Singh	Samajwadi Party
Bara	None	Udai Bhan Karvaria	Bharatiya Janata Party
Jhusi	None	Vijaya Yadav	Samajwadi Party
Handia	None	Mahesh Narain Singh	Samajwadi Party
Pratappur	None	Shyam Surat Upadhya	Indian National Congress
Soraon	None	Mohd Mujtaba Siddiqui	Bahujan Samaj Party
Nawabganj	None	Ansar Ahmad	Apna Dal
Allahabad North	None	Dr. Narendra Kumar Singh Gaur	Bharatiya Janata Party
Allahabad South	None	Keshari Nath Tripathi	Bharatiya Janata Party
Allahabad West	None	Atiq Ahmad	Apna Dal
Chail	SC	Dayaram	Bahujan Samaj Party
Manjhanpur	SC	Indrajit Saroj	Bahujan Samaj Party
Sirathu	SC	Matesh Chandra Sonkar	Bahujan Samaj Party
Khaga	None	Mohd. Shafir	Bahujan Samaj Party
Kishunpur	SC	Krishna Paswan	Bharatiya Janata Party
Haswa	None	Ayodhya Prasad Pal	Bahujan Samaj Party
Fatehpur	None	Anand Prakash Lohdi	Bahujan Samaj Party
Jahanabad	None	Madan Gopal Varma	Samajwadi Party
Bindki	None	Amar Jeet Singh "jansewak"	Bharatiya Janata Party
Aryanagar	None	Haji Mushtaq Solanki	Samajwadi Party
Sisamau	SC	Sanjeev Daryawadi	Indian National Congress
Generalganj	None	Salil Vishnoi	Bharatiya Janata Party
Kanpur Cantonment	None	Satish Mahana	Bharatiya Janata Party
Govindnagar	None	Ajay Kapoor	Indian National Congress
Kalyanpur	None	Prem Lata Katiyar	Bharatiya Janata Party
Sarsaul	None	Aruna Tomar	Samajwadi Party
Ghatampur	None	Rakesh Sachan	Samajwadi Party
Bhognipur	SC	Arun Kumari	Samajwadi Party
Rajpur	None	Mahesh Chandra	Independent
Sarvankhera	None	Ram Swaroop Singh	Bahujan Samaj Party
Chaubepur	None	Ashok Kumar	Bahujan Samaj Party
Bilhaur	SC	Shiv Kumar Beria	Samajwadi Party
Derapur	None	Kamlesh Kumar Pathak	Samajwadi Party
Auraiya	None	Ram Ji Shukla	Bahujan Samaj Party
Ajitmal	SC	Madan Singh Alias Santosh Kumar	Bahujan Samaj Party
Lakhana	SC	Sukhdevi Verma	Samajwadi Party
Etawah	None	Mahendra Singh Rajpoot	Samajwadi Party
Jaswantnagar	None	Shivpal Singh Yadav	Samajwadi Party
Bharthana	None	Vinod Kumar Yadav "kakka"	Indian National Congress
Bidhuna	None	Vinay Shakya	Bahujan Samaj Party
Kannauj	SC	Kalyan Singh Dohare	Samajwadi Party
Umardha	None	Vijay Bahadur Pal	Samajwadi Party
Chhibramau	None	Ram Prakash Tripathi	Bharatiya Janata Party
Kamalganj	None	Jamaluddin Siddiqui	Samajwadi Party
Farrukhabad	None	Bijai Singh	Independent
Kaimganj	None	Luis Khursheed	Indian National Congress
Mohammdabad	None	Narendra Singh Yadav	Samajwadi Party
Manikpur	SC	Daddu Prashad	Bahujan Samaj Party
Karwi	None	R. K. Singh Patel	Bahujan Samaj Party
Baberu	None	Gaya Charan Dinkar	Bahujan Samaj Party
Tindwari	None	Vishambhar Prasad Nishad	Samajwadi Party
Banda	None	Babu Lal Kushwaha	Bahujan Samaj Party
Naraini	None	Dr. Surendra Pal Verma	Bahujan Samaj Party
Hamirpur	None	Sheo Charan	Bahujan Samaj Party
Maudaha	None	Badshah Singh	Bharatiya Janata Party
Rath	None	Dhooram	Bahujan Samaj Party
Charkhari	SC	Ambesh Kumari	Samajwadi Party
Mahoba	None	Siddha Gopal	Samajwadi Party
Mehroni	None	Pooran Singh Bundela	Bharatiya Janata Party
Lalitpur	None	Birendra Singh Bund Bhagatraja	Indian National Congress
Jhansi	None	Ramesh Kumar Sharma	Bahujan Samaj Party
Babina	SC	Ratan Lal Ahirwar	Samajwadi Party
Mauranipur	SC	Pragilal Ahirwar	Bharatiya Janata Party
Garoutha	None	Brijendra Kumar Vyas "damdam Mahraj"	Bahujan Samaj Party
Konch	SC	Daya Shanker Verma	Bharatiya Janata Party
Orai	None	Babu Ram M.com	Bharatiya Janata Party
Kalpi	None	Arun Kumar Meharotra	Bharatiya Janata Party
Madhogarh	None	Brajendra Pratap Singh	Bahujan Samaj Party
Bhongaon	None	Alok Kumar	Samajwadi Party
Kishni	SC	Sandhya Katheriya	Samajwadi Party
Karhal	None	Sovran Singh	Bharatiya Janata Party
Shikohabad	None	Hari Om	Samajwadi Party
Jasrana	None	Ramvir Singh	Samajwadi Party
Ghiror	None	Jaibir Singh	Bahujan Samaj Party
Mainpuri	None	Ashok Singh Chauhan	Bharatiya Janata Party
Aliganj	None	Rameshwer Singh Yadav	Samajwadi Party
Patiali	None	Rajendra Singh Chauhan	Bahujan Samaj Party
Sakit	None	Suraj Singh Shakya	Samajwadi Party
Soron	None	Devendra Pratap	Rashtriya Kranti Party
Kasganj	None	Manpal Singh	Samajwadi Party
Etah	None	Shishu Pal Singh Yadav	Samajwadi Party
Nidhauli Kalan	None	Anil Kumar Singh Yadav	Samajwadi Party
Jalesar	SC	Anar Singh Diwakar	Samajwadi Party
Firozabad	None	Azim Bhai	Samajwadi Party
Bah	None	Raja Mahendra Aridaman Singh	Bharatiya Janata Party
Fatehabad	None	Chhotelal Verma	Bharatiya Janata Party
Tundla	SC	Mohan Dev Shankhvar	Samajwadi Party
Etmadpur	SC	Ganga Prasad Pushkar	Rashtriya Lok Dal
Dayalbagh	None	Seth Kishan Lal Baghel	Bahujan Samaj Party
Agra Cantonment	None	Mohammad Basheer	Bahujan Samaj Party
Agra East	None	Jagan Prasad Garg	Bharatiya Janata Party
Agra West	SC	Dr. Ram Babu Harit	Bharatiya Janata Party
Kheragarh	None	Ramesh Kant Lawania	Bharatiya Janata Party
Fatehpur Sikri	None	Chaudhary Babu Lal	Rashtriya Lok Dal
Goverdhan	SC	Shyam	Bharatiya Janata Party
Mathura	None	Pradeep Mathur	Indian National Congress
Chhata	None	Tej Pal Singh	Rashtriya Lok Dal
Mat	None	Shyam Sunder Sharma	Akhil Bharatiya Loktantrik Congress
Gokul	None	Prem Singh	Rashtriya Lok Dal
Sadabad	None	Pratap	Rashtriya Lok Dal
Hathras	None	Ramvir Upadhyay	Bahujan Samaj Party
Sasni	SC	Devki Nandan	Bharatiya Janata Party
Sikandara Rao	None	Amar Singh Yadav	Independent
Gangiri	None	Vireshwar	Samajwadi Party
Atrauli	None	Kalyan Singh	Rashtriya Kranti Party
Aligarh	None	Vivek Bansal	Indian National Congress
Koil	SC	Mahender Singh	Bahujan Samaj Party
Iglas	None	Vijendra Singh	Indian National Congress
Barauli	None	Thakur Jaiveer Singh	Bahujan Samaj Party
Khair	None	Pramod Gaur	Bahujan Samaj Party
Jewar	SC	Narendra Kumar	Bahujan Samaj Party
Khurja	None	Anil Kumar	Bahujan Samaj Party
Debai	None	Kalyan Singh	Rashtriya Kranti Party
Anupshahr	None	Hoshiyar Singh	Independent
Siana	None	Sunder Singh	Rashtriya Kranti Party
Agota	None	Kiran Pal Singh	Samajwadi Party
Bulandshahr	None	Mahendra Singh Yadav	Bharatiya Janata Party
Shikarpur	SC	Munshi Lal Gautam	Bharatiya Janata Party
Sikandrabad	None	Ved Ram Bhati	Bahujan Samaj Party
Dadri	None	Nawab Singh Nagar	Bharatiya Janata Party
Ghaziabad	None	Surendra Prakash Goel	Indian National Congress
Muradnagar	None	Rajpal Tyagi	Indian National Congress
Modinagar	None	Narendra Singh Sisodiya	Bharatiya Janata Party
Hapur	SC	Dharampal	Bahujan Samaj Party
Garhmukteshwar	None	Madan Chouhan	Samajwadi Party
Kithore	None	Shahid Manzoor	Samajwadi Party
Hastinapur	SC	Prabhu Dayal	Samajwadi Party
Sardhana	None	Prof. Ravindra Pundir	Bharatiya Janata Party
Meerut Cantonment	None	Satya Prakash Agarwal	Bharatiya Janata Party
Meerut	None	Dr. Laxmikant Bajpai	Bharatiya Janata Party
Kharkhauda	None	Haji Yaqoob	Bahujan Samaj Party
Siwalkhas	SC	Ranveer Rana	Rashtriya Lok Dal
Khekra	None	Madan Bhaiya	Independent
Baghpat	None	Kawkab Hameed Khan	Rashtriya Lok Dal
Barnawa	None	Samar Pal Singh	Rashtriya Lok Dal
Chhaprauli	None	Ajay Kumar	Rashtriya Lok Dal
Kandhla	None	Virendra Singh	Rashtriya Lok Dal
Khatauli	None	Rajpal Singh Baliyan	Rashtriya Lok Dal
Jansath	SC	Yashwant	Rashtriya Lok Dal
Morna	None	Rajpal Singh Saini	Bahujan Samaj Party
Muzaffarnagar	None	Chitranjan Swarup	Samajwadi Party
Charthawal	SC	Uma	Bahujan Samaj Party
Baghra	None	Anuradha Chaudhari	Rashtriya Lok Dal
Kairana	None	Hukum Singh	Bharatiya Janata Party
Thana Bhawan	None	Kiran Pal	Samajwadi Party
Nakur	None	Dr. Sushil Chaudhary	Indian National Congress
Sarsawa	None	Dharam Singh	Bahujan Samaj Party
Nagal	SC	Ilam Singh	Bahujan Samaj Party
Deoband	None	Rajendra Singh Rana	Bahujan Samaj Party
Harora	SC	Mayawati	Bahujan Samaj Party
Saharanpur	None	Sanjay Garg	Janata Party
Muzaffarabad	None	Jagdish Singh Rana	Samajwadi Party
