= Bachhrawan Assembly constituency =

Constituency of the Uttar Pradesh legislative assembly in India

Bachhrawan
- Constituency No. 177 for the Uttar Pradesh Legislative Assembly

Constituency details
- Country: India
- Region: North India
- State: Uttar Pradesh
- District: Rae Bareli
- Total electors: 3,37,025
- Reservation: SC

Member of Legislative Assembly
- 18th Uttar Pradesh Legislative Assembly
- Incumbent Shyam Sunder Bharti
- Party: Samajwadi Party
- Elected year: 2022
- Preceded by: Ram Naresh Rawat

Bachhrawan is a constituency of the Uttar Pradesh Legislative Assembly covering the city of Bachhrawan in the Rae Bareli district of Uttar Pradesh, India. Bachhrawan is one of five assembly constituencies in the Lok Sabha constituency of Rae Bareli. Since 2008, this assembly constituency is numbered 177 amongst 403 constituencies.

== Members of the Legislative Assembly ==
Year	Member	Party
1957	Rameshwar Prasad	Indian National Congress
1957	Chandrika Prasad	Indian National Congress
1962	Bhagwan Din	Socialist Party
1967	Ram Dularey	Indian National Congress
1969	Ram Dularey	Indian National Congress
1974	Ram Dularey	Indian National Congress
1977	Ram Dularey	Indian National Congress
1980	Shiv Darshan	Indian National Congress (Indira)
1985	Shiv Darshan	Indian National Congress
1989	Shiv Darshan	Indian National Congress
1991	Shiv Darshan	Indian National Congress
1993	Raja Ram Tyagi	Bharatiya Janata Party
1996	Shyam Sunder Bharti	Bahujan Samaj Party
2002	Ram Lal Akela	Samajwadi Party
2007	Raja Ram Tyagi	Indian National Congress
2012	Ram Lal Akela	Samajwadi Party
2017	Ram Naresh Rawat	Bharatiya Janata Party
2022	Shyam Sunder Bharti	Samajwadi Party

== Election results ==
=== 2027 ===
2027 Uttar Pradesh Legislative Assembly election: Bachhrawan
Party	Candidate	Votes	%	±%
INDIA				
NDA				
BSP				
NOTA	None of the above			
Majority				
Turnout				
gain from		Swing		

=== 2022 ===
2022 Uttar Pradesh Legislative Assembly election: Bachhrawan
Party	Candidate	Votes	%	±%
SP	Shyam Sunder Bharti	65,747	31.38	
AD(S)	Laxmikant Rawat	62,935	30.04	
INC	Sushil Pasi	56,835	27.13	+5.42
BSP	Lajwanti Kuril	13,730	6.55	−10.4
NOTA	None of the above	2,200	1.05	−0.66
Majority		2,812	1.34	−9.92
Turnout		209,512	62.17	−1.2
SP gain from BJP		Swing		

=== 2017 ===
Bharatiya Janta Party candidate Ram Naresh Rawat won in 2017 Uttar Pradesh Legislative Elections defeating Indian National Congress candidate Shahab Sharan by a margin of 22,309 votes.

2017 Uttar Pradesh Legislative Assembly election: Bachhrawan
Party	Candidate	Votes	%	±%
BJP	Ram Naresh Rawat	65,324	32.97	
INC	Shahab Sharan	43,015	21.71	
BSP	Shyam Sunder Bharti	33,582	16.95	
Independent	Sushil Pasi	23,271	11.74	
RLD	Ram Lal Akela	21,694	10.95	
NOTA	None of the above	3,325	1.71	
Majority		22,309	11.26	
Turnout		198,147	63.37	
BJP gain from SP		Swing		
