= Lucknow Central Assembly constituency =

Constituency of the Uttar Pradesh legislative assembly in India

Lucknow Central
- Constituency No. 174 for the Uttar Pradesh Legislative Assembly

Constituency details
- Country: India
- Region: North India
- State: Uttar Pradesh
- District: Lucknow
- Lok Sabha constituency: Lucknow
- Total electors: 3,70,629
- Reservation: None

Member of Legislative Assembly
- 18th Uttar Pradesh Legislative Assembly
- Incumbent Ravidas Mehrotra
- Party: Samajwadi Party
- Alliance: SP+
- Elected year: 2022

Lucknow Central is a constituency of the Uttar Pradesh Legislative Assembly covering the city of Central part of Lucknow in the Lucknow district of Uttar Pradesh, India.

Lucknow Central is one of five assembly constituencies in the Lucknow. Since 2008, this assembly constituency is numbered 174 amongst 403 constituencies.

Currently, this seat belongs to the SP candidate Ravidas Mehrotra who won in last Assembly election of 2022 Uttar Pradesh Legislative Elections defeating BJP candidate Rajnish Kumar Gupta by a margin of 10,935 votes.

== Members of the Legislative Assembly ==
Year	Member	Party
1952	Syed Ali Zaheer	Indian National Congress
1952^	Harish Chandra Bajpai	Indian National Congress
1952^	Ram Shankar Rabivasi	Indian National Congress
1957	Mahabir Prasad Srivastava	Indian National Congress
1962	Mahabir Prasad Srivastava	Indian National Congress
1967	S. K. Vidyarthi	Bharatiya Jana Sangh
1969	Imitiaz Husain	Bharatiya Kranti Dal
1974	Ramesh Chandra Srivastava	Indian National Congress
1977	Ram Prakash	Janata Party
1980	Mohammad Rafi Siddiqui	Indian National Congress (I)
1985	Naresh Chandra	Indian National Congress
1989	Basant Lal Gupta	Bharatiya Janata Party
1991	Basant Lal Gupta	Bharatiya Janata Party
1993	Ram Prakash Gupta	Bharatiya Janata Party
1996	Suresh Srivastava	Bharatiya Janata Party
2002	Suresh Srivastava	Bharatiya Janata Party
2007	Suresh Srivastava	Bharatiya Janata Party
2012	Ravidas Mehrotra	Samajwadi Party
2017	Brajesh Pathak	Bharatiya Janata Party
2022	Ravidas Mehrotra	Samajwadi Party

== Election results ==
Vote share of winning candidates
2022	49.62%
2017	40.20%
2012	37.05%
2007	34.79%
2002	38.94%
1996	59.21%
1993	54.06%
1991	56.15%
1989	34.76%

=== 2027 ===
2027 Uttar Pradesh Legislative Assembly election: Lucknow Central
Party	Candidate	Votes	%	±%
INDIA				
BJP				
BSP				
NOTA	None of the above			
Majority				
Turnout				
gain from		Swing		

=== 2022 ===
2022 Uttar Pradesh Legislative Assembly election: Lucknow Central
Party	Candidate	Votes	%	±%
SP	Ravidas Mehrotra	104,488	49.62	▲12.03
BJP	Rajnish Kumar Gupta	93,553	44.43	▲4.23
BSP	Ashish Chandra	6,181	2.94	▼9.53
INC	Sadaf Jafar	2,927	1.39	▼5.24
NOTA	None of the above	960	0.46	▲0.04
Majority		10,935	5.19	▲2.58
Turnout		210,567	56.81	▲3.66
SP gain from BJP		Swing	+3.90	

=== 2017 ===
2017 Uttar Pradesh Legislative Assembly election: Lucknow Central
Party	Candidate	Votes	%	±%
BJP	Brajesh Pathak	78,400	40.2	
SP	Ravidas Mehrotra	73,306	37.59	
BSP	Rajeev Srivastava	24,313	12.47	
INC	Abdul Maroof Khan	12,921	6.63	
AIMIM	Mohammad Irfan	2,314	1.19	
NOTA	None of the above	824	0.42	
Majority		5,094	2.61	
Turnout		195,025	53.15	
BJP gain from SP		Swing	+8.03	

=== 2012 ===
2012 Uttar Pradesh state assembly election: Lucknow Central
Party	Candidate	Votes	%	±%
SP	Ravidas Mehrotra	62,622	37.05	+6.67
BJP	Vidya Sagar Gupta	39,890	23.60	−11.19
INC	Fakhir Siddiqui	35,623	21.08	+5.17
BSP	Mohammad Naseem Siddiqui	23,956	14.17	−1.48
Majority		22,732	13.45	+9.04
Turnout		1,69,019	50.91	+22.56
SP gain from BJP		Swing	+8.93	

=== 2007 ===
U. P. Assembly Election, 2007: Lucknow Central
Party	Candidate	Votes	%	±%
BJP	Suresh Kumar Srivastava	30,872	34.79	−4.15
SP	Ravidas Mehrotra	26,962	30.38	+3.85
INC	Manjoor Ahmad	14,123	15.91	+1.84
BSP	Nagendra Mohan	13,892	15.65	+5.88
Majority		3,910	4.41	−8.00
Turnout		88,721	28.35	−3.54
BJP hold		Swing	-0.15	

=== 2002 ===
U. P. Assembly Election, 2002: Lucknow Central
Party	Candidate	Votes	%	±%
BJP	Suresh Kumar Srivastava	37,388	38.94	−20.27
SP	Banware Lal Kanchal	25,473	26.53	−3.07
INC	Sushil Dubey	13,513	14.07	
BSP	Mohammad Gayasuddin Hashmi	9,381	9.77	−0.63
RTKP	Kusum Rai	6,622	6.90	
Majority		11,915	12.41	−17.2
Turnout		96,021	31.89	−11.32
BJP hold		Swing	-8.60	

=== 1996 ===
U. P. Assembly Election, 1996: Lucknow Central
Party	Candidate	Votes	%	±%
BJP	Suresh Kumar Srivastava	72,338	59.21	+5.15
SP	Waliullah Javed	36,171	29.60	−5.60
BSP	Umesh Chandra	12,705	10.40	
Majority		36,167	29.61	+10.75
Turnout		1,22,179	43.21	−8.89
BJP hold		Swing	+5.37	

=== 1993 ===
U. P. Assembly Election, 1993: Lucknow Central
Party	Candidate	Votes	%	±%
BJP	Ram Prakash	63,396	54.06	−2.09
SP	Vinod Behari Verma	41,278	35.20	
INC	Mohammad Rafi Siddiqui	8,528	7.27	−9.04
JD	Kamal Khan	1,415	1.21	−0.58
SS	Vinod Kumar Singh	630	0.54	
Majority		22,118	18.86	−13.36
Turnout		1,17,262	52.10	+21.28
BJP hold		Swing		

=== 1991 ===
U. P. Assembly Election, 1991: Lucknow Central
Party	Candidate	Votes	%	±%
BJP	Basant Lal Gupta	43,744	56.15	+21.39
JP	Musheer Ahmad Lari	18,644	23.93	
INC	Naresh Chandra	10,607	13.61	−11.27
JD	Abdul Hakeem	1,394	1.79	−27.9
BSP	Sayed Sikander Abbas Rizvi	1,181	1.52	
Majority		25,100	32.22	+27.1
Turnout		77,911	30.82	+6.28
BJP hold		Swing		

=== 1989 ===
U. P. Assembly Election, 1989: Lucknow Central
Party	Candidate	Votes	%	±%
BJP	Basant Lal Gupta	21,272	34.76	
JD	Musheer Ahmad Lari	18,151	29.66	
INC	Naresh Chandra	13,758	22.48	
CPI	Ram Kishor Sharma	1,550	2.53	
Majority		3,121	5.10	
Turnout		61,204	24.54	
BJP gain from INC		Swing		

== See also ==
- Lucknow district
- List of constituencies of the Uttar Pradesh Legislative Assembly
