= Lucknow West Assembly constituency =

Constituency of the Uttar Pradesh legislative assembly in India

Coordinates: 26.858°N 80.866°E

Lucknow West
- Constituency No. 171 for the Uttar Pradesh Legislative Assembly

Constituency details
- Country: India
- Region: North India
- State: Uttar Pradesh
- District: Lucknow
- Lok Sabha constituency: Lucknow
- Total electors: 4,43,178
- Reservation: None

Member of Legislative Assembly
- 18th Uttar Pradesh Legislative Assembly
- Incumbent Armaan Khan
- Party: SP
- Alliance: SP+
- Elected year: 2022

Lucknow West is a constituency of the Uttar Pradesh Legislative Assembly covering the city of Western part of Lucknow in the Lucknow district of Uttar Pradesh, India and VVPAT facility with EVMs was here in 2017 U. P. assembly polls.

Lucknow West is one of five assembly constituencies in the Lucknow Lok Sabha constituency. Since 2008, this assembly constituency is numbered 171 amongst 403 constituencies.

Currently this seat belongs to Samajwadi Party candidate Armaan Khan who won in last Assembly election of 2022 Uttar Pradesh Legislative Elections defeating Bhartiya Janta Party candidate Anjani Kumar Srivastava by a margin of 8,184 votes.

== Members of the Legislative Assembly ==
Year	Member	Party
1952	Pulin Behari Bannerji	Indian National Congress
1957	Basant Lal	Indian National Congress
1957	Syed Ali Zaheer	Indian National Congress
1962	Syed Ali Zaheer	Indian National Congress
1967	Shankar Sharma	Bharatiya Jana Sangh
1969	D. P. Bora	Bharatiya Kranti Dal
1974	Shakeel Ahmed	Indian National Congress
1977	D. P. Bora	Janata Party
1980	Kanhaiya Lal Mahendru	Indian National Congress (I)
1985	Zafar Ali Naqvi	Indian National Congress
1989	Ram Kumar Shukla	Bharatiya Janata Party
1991	Ram Kumar Shukla	Bharatiya Janata Party
1993	Ram Kumar Shukla	Bharatiya Janata Party
1996	Lalji Tandon	Bharatiya Janata Party
2002	Lalji Tandon	Bharatiya Janata Party
2007	Lalji Tandon	Bharatiya Janata Party
2009^	Shyam Kishore Shukla	Indian National Congress
2012	Mohammad Rehan Naeem	Samajwadi Party
2017	Suresh Srivastava	Bharatiya Janata Party
2022	Armaan Khan	Samajwadi Party

== Election results ==
=== 2027 ===
2027 Uttar Pradesh Legislative Assembly election: Lucknow West
Party	Candidate	Votes	%	±%
BJP				
INDIA				
BSP				
NOTA	None of the above			
Majority				
Turnout				
gain from		Swing		

=== 2022 ===
U.P. Legislative Assembly Election, 2022: Lucknow West
Party	Candidate	Votes	%	±%
SP	Armaan Khan	124,497	48.19	▲11.44
BJP	Anjani Kumar Srivastava	116,313	45.03	▲2.27
BSP	Khayam Raza Khan	10,061	3.89	▼12.77
INC	Shahana Siddiqui	2,796	1.08	
NOTA	None of the above	1,334	0.52	▲0.23
Majority		8,184	3.16	▼2.85
Turnout		258,320	58.29	▲2.2
SP gain from BJP		Swing		

=== 2017 ===
U. P. Legislative Assembly Election, 2017: Lucknow West
Party	Candidate	Votes	%	±%
BJP	Suresh Kumar Srivastava	93,022	42.76	
SP	Mohammad Rehan Naeem	79,950	36.75	
BSP	Armaan Khan	36,247	16.66	
NOTA	None of the above	635	0.29	
Majority		13,072	6.01	
Turnout		217,554	56.09	
BJP gain from SP		Swing		

=== 2012 ===
U. P. Legislative Assembly Election, 2012: Lucknow West
Party	Candidate	Votes	%	±%
SP	Mohammad Rehan Naeem	49,912	29.35	
BJP	Suresh Kumar Srivastava	42,100	24.76	
INC	Shyam Kishore Shukla	36,185	21.28	
BSP	Dr. Sayed Sahid Hussain	27,008	15.88	
PECP	Dr. Azizul Hasan Khan	3,798	2.23	
Majority		7,812	4.59	
Turnout		1,70,048	49.98	
SP gain from INC		Swing		

By Election, 2009: Lucknow West
Party	Candidate	Votes	%	±%
INC	Shyam Kishore Shukla	32,166	30.03	
BJP	Amit Puri	29,990	28.00	
BSP	Abhinav Mishra	20,669	19.30	
SP	Bukkal Nawab	19,828	18.51	
PECP	Abdul Nadeem	689	0.64	
Majority		2,176	2.03	
Turnout		1,07,081	25.25	
INC gain from BJP		Swing		

U. P. Legislative Assembly Election, 2007: Lucknow West
Party	Candidate	Votes	%	±%
BJP	Lal Ji Tandon	43,290	38.42	
SP	Bukkal Nawab	29,468	26.15	
BSP	Dr. Neeraj Bora	24,438	21.68	
INC	Sushil Dubey	11,011	9.77	
ABHM	Hari Om	572	0.50	
Majority		13,822	12.27	
Turnout		1,12,672	27.88	
BJP hold		Swing		

U. P. Legislative Assembly Election, 2002: Lucknow West
Party	Candidate	Votes	%	±%
BJP	Lal Ji Tandon	57,628	46.04	
SP	Virendra Bhatia	43,089	34.43	
BSP	Intizar Abidi	8,625	6.89	
INC	Fareed Aslam Rizvi	8,363	6.68	
IND.	Payal Kinner	1,680	1.34	
Majority		14,539	11.61	
Turnout		1,25,165	29.56	
BJP hold		Swing		

U. P. Legislative Assembly Election, 1996: Lucknow West
Party	Candidate	Votes	%	±%
BJP	Lal Ji Tandon	79,851	55.21	
SP	Kailash Shankar Shukla	50,115	34.65	
INC	Abdul Kalam Khan	12,292	8.50	
AD(K)	Kripa Shankar Katiyar	512	0.35	
IND.	Dhirendra Bahadur Singh	359	0.25	
Majority		29,736	20.56	
Turnout		1,44,629	40.18	
BJP hold		Swing		

U. P. Legislative Assembly Election, 1993: Lucknow West
Party	Candidate	Votes	%	±%
BJP	Ram Kumar Shukla	61,781	49.72	
SP	Mahesh Nath Mahendra	51,415	41.38	
INC	Kanhaiya Lal Mahendru	7,055	5.68	
JD	Jagdeep Singh Yadav	1,973	1.59	
IND.	Sharda Tripathi	214	0.17	
Majority		10,366	8.34	
Turnout		1,24,262	50.44	
BJP hold		Swing		

U. P. Legislative Assembly Election, 1991: Lucknow West
Party	Candidate	Votes	%	±%
BJP	Ram Kumar Shukla	41,537	48.48	
JP	Arun Shankar	26,714	31.18	
INC	Shafayat Husain	8,403	9.81	
JD	D. P. Bora	4,797	5.60	
LKD	Hasmat Ali	1,366	1.59	
BSP	Jameel Ahmed	1,017	1.19	
Majority		14,823	17.30	
Turnout		85,682	32.42	
BJP hold		Swing		

U. P. Legislative Assembly Election, 1989: Lucknow West
Party	Candidate	Votes	%	±%
BJP	Ram Kumar Shukla	20,713	33.85	
JD	Jagdeep Singh Yadav	16,723	27.33	
INC	Mohammad Usman	15,659	25.59	
QM	S. E. Kafil Ahmed	3,596	5.88	
BSP	Chhote Lal Verma	2,168	3.54	
Majority		3,990	6.52	
Turnout		61,195	26.01	
BJP gain from INC		Swing		
