= Lucknow East Assembly constituency =

Constituency of the Uttar Pradesh legislative assembly in India

Lucknow East
- Constituency No. 173 for the Uttar Pradesh Legislative Assembly

Constituency details
- Country: India
- Region: North India
- State: Uttar Pradesh
- District: Lucknow
- Lok Sabha constituency: Lucknow
- Reservation: None

Member of Legislative Assembly
- 18th Uttar Pradesh Legislative Assembly
- Incumbent O. P. Srivastava
- Party: BJP
- Elected year: 2024

Lucknow East is a constituency of the Uttar Pradesh Legislative Assembly covering the city of Eastern part of Lucknow in the Lucknow district of Uttar Pradesh, India. A Voter-verified paper audit trail (VVPAT) facility with EVMs was used here in 2017 U.P. assembly polls.

Lucknow East is one of five assembly constituencies in the Lucknow Lok Sabha constituency. Since 2008, this assembly constituency is numbered 173 amongst 403 constituencies.

== Members of Legislative Assembly ==
Year	Member	Party
1952	Chandra Bhanu Gupta	Indian National Congress
1957	Triloki Singh	Praja Socialist Party
1962	Kishori Lal Agarwal	Indian National Congress
1967	Radhey Shyam Kapoor	Bharatiya Jana Sangh
1969	Bans Gopal Shukla	Bharatiya Kranti Dal
1974	Swaroop Kumari Bakshi	Indian National Congress
1977	Swaroop Kumari Bakshi	Indian National Congress
1980	Swaroop Kumari Bakshi	Indian National Congress (I)
1985	Swaroop Kumari Bakshi	Indian National Congress
1989	Ravidas Mehrotra	Janata Dal
1991	Bhagwati Prasad Shukla	Bharatiya Janata Party
1993	Bhagwati Prasad Shukla	Bharatiya Janata Party
1996	Vidya Sagar Gupta	Bharatiya Janata Party
2002	Vidya Sagar Gupta	Bharatiya Janata Party
2007	Vidya Sagar Gupta	Bharatiya Janata Party
2012	Kalraj Mishra	Bharatiya Janata Party
2014^	Ashutosh Tandon	Bharatiya Janata Party
2017	Ashutosh Tandon	Bharatiya Janata Party
2022	Ashutosh Tandon	Bharatiya Janata Party
2024^	O. P. Srivastava	Bharatiya Janata Party

^ denotes bypoll

== Election results ==
=== 2027 ===
2027 Uttar Pradesh Legislative Assembly election: Lucknow East
Party	Candidate	Votes	%	±%
BJP				
INDIA				
BSP				
NOTA	None of the above			
Majority				
Turnout				
gain from		Swing		

=== 2024 bypoll ===
Uttar Pradesh Legislative Assembly by-election, 2024: Lucknow East
Party	Candidate	Votes	%	±%
BJP	O. P. Srivastava	142,948	58.43	▼0.97
INC	Mukesh Chauhan	89,061	36.41	▲34.67
BSP	Alok Kushwaha	8,323	3.4	▼0.42
NOTA	None of the Above	2,707	1.11	▲0.49
Majority		53,887	22.02	▼4.68
Turnout		2,44,634	52.48	▼3.79
BJP hold		Swing		

=== 2022 ===
2022 Uttar Pradesh Legislative Assembly election: Lucknow East
Party	Candidate	Votes	%	±%
BJP	Ashutosh Tandon	152,928	59.4	+0.15
SP	Anurag Bhadouria	84,197	32.7	
BSP	Aashish Sinha	9,834	3.82	−9.94
INC	Manoj Tiwari	4,485	1.74	−22.78
AAP	Alok Singh	2,680	1.04	
NOTA	None of the above	1,595	0.62	−0.15
Majority		68,731	26.7	−8.03
Turnout		257,468	56.27	+2.32
BJP hold		Swing		

=== 2017 ===
U. P. Assembly Election, 2017: Lucknow East
Party	Candidate	Votes	%	±%
BJP	Ashutosh Tandon	135,167	59.25	
INC	Anurag Bhadouria	55,937	24.52	
BSP	Saroj Kumar Shukla	31,390	13.76	
NOTA	None of the above	1,747	0.77	
Majority		79,230	34.73	
Turnout		228,115	53.95	
BJP hold		Swing	+7.20	

=== 2014 ===
By-election, 2014: Lucknow East
Party	Candidate	Votes	%	±%
BJP	Ashutosh Tandon	71,640	52.05	+15.74
SP	Juhie Singh	45,181	32.82	+7.51
INC	Ramesh Srivastava	9,757	7.09	−11.52
Independent	Shiv Pal Singh	7,115	5.17	+5.17
CPI	Rajpal	876	0.64	+0.64
NOTA	None of the Above	1,379	1.00	+1.00
Majority		26,459	19.23	+8.23
Turnout		1,37,643	33.06	−20.05
BJP hold		Swing	+15.74	

=== 2012 ===
U. P. Assembly Election, 2012: Lucknow East
Party	Candidate	Votes	%	±%
BJP	Kalraj Mishra	68,726	36.31	+8.22
SP	Juhie Singh	47,908	25.31	−1.84
INC	Ramesh Srivastava	35,227	18.61	−1.89
BSP	Krishna Chandra Tripathi	28,040	14.82	−6.11
BJSWP	Murtaz Ali	2,348	1.24	+1.24
Majority		20,818	11.00	+10.06
Turnout		1,89,267	53.11	+21.57
BJP hold		Swing	+10.06	

=== 2007 ===
U. P. Assembly Election, 2007: Lucknow East
Party	Candidate	Votes	%	±%
BJP	Vidya Sagar Gupta	18,892	28.08	
SP	Fakhir Siddiqui	18,261	27.14	
BSP	Gopal Narayan Misra	14,076	20.92	
INC	Sudhir S. Halwasiya	13,786	20.49	
RLD	Aparna Singh	347	0.51	
Majority		631	0.94	
Turnout		67,264	31.54	
BJP hold		Swing		

=== 2002 ===
U. P. Assembly Election, 2002: Lucknow East
Party	Candidate	Votes	%	±%
BJP	Vidya Sagar Gupta	23,429	33.31	
SP	Ravidas Mehrotra	23,090	32.82	
INC	Kush Bhargava	9,728	13.83	
Independent	Amit Puri	8,619	12.25	
BSP	Mohammad Yunus	3,055	4.34	
Majority		339	0.49	
Turnout		70,345	31.14	
BJP hold		Swing		

=== 1996 ===
U. P. Assembly Election, 1996: Lucknow East
Party	Candidate	Votes	%	±%
BJP	Vidya Sagar Gupta	49,653	66.74	
AIIC(T)	Azad Sarwan Kumar Agrawal	13,033	17.52	
BSP	Swadesh Kumar	8,489	11.41	
CPI	Rajendra Kumar Shukla	1,918	2.58	
SS	Anup Kumar Awasthi	612	0.82	
Majority		36,620	49.22	
Turnout		74,403	34.70	
BJP hold		Swing		

=== 1993 ===
U. P. Assembly Election, 1993: Lucknow East
Party	Candidate	Votes	%	±%
BJP	Bhagwati Prasad Shukla	48,121	54.05	
SP	Luv Bhargava	27,442	30.83	
INC	Deepa Kaul	11,128	12.50	
JD	Fareed Ahmad Siddiqui	536	0.60	
SS	Mragendra Kumar Pandey	202	0.23	
Majority		20,679	23.22	
Turnout		89,023	52.94	
BJP hold		Swing		

=== 1991 ===
U. P. Assembly Election, 1991: Lucknow East
Party	Candidate	Votes	%	±%
BJP	Bhagwati Prasad Shukla	36,605	55.51	
INC	Swaroop Kumari Bakshi	12,193	18.49	
JP	Vijay Shankar	9,068	13.75	
JD	Ravidas Mehrotra	4,665	7.07	
BSP	Jitendra Hari Prasad	1,115	1.69	
Majority		24,412	37.02	
Turnout		65,941	28.67	
BJP gain from JD		Swing		

=== 1989 ===
U. P. Assembly Election, 1989: Lucknow East
Party	Candidate	Votes	%	±%
JD	Ravidas Mehrotra	23,966	41.68	
INC	Swaroop Kumari Bakshi	17,053	29.66	
BJP	Bhagwati Prasad Shukla	10,764	18.72	
Independent	Krishan Kumar	1,733	3.01	
Independent	Israr Ahmad	1,128	1.96	
Majority		6,913	12.02	
Turnout		57,504	25.36	
JD gain from INC		Swing		
