= Armaan Khan =

Armaan Khan may refer to:

- Armaan Khan (cricketer)
- Armaan Khan (politician)
