= Department of Urban Development (Uttar Pradesh) =

Department of Uttar Pradesh, India

- Nagara Vikāsa Vibhāga

Department overview
- Jurisdiction: State of Uttar Pradesh
- Headquarters: Department of Urban Development, Lal Bahadur Shastri Bhawan (Annexy Building), Sarojini Naidu Marg, Lucknow, Uttar Pradesh; 26.8404943°N 80.94444599999997°E
- Annual budget: ₹13,189 crore (US$2.06 billion) (2017-18 est.)
- Minister responsible: Arvind Kumar Sharma, Cabinet Minister for Urban Development
- Deputy Minister responsible: Rakesh Rathore Guru, Minister of State for Urban Development
- Department executive: Manoj Kumar Singh, IAS, Principal Secretary (Urban Development)
- Child agencies: Directorate of Local Bodies; Uttar Pradesh Jal Nigam; State Urban Development Agency
- Website: Official Website

The Department of Urban Development (IAST: Nagara Vikāsa Vibhāga), often abbreviated as DoUD, is a department of Government of Uttar Pradesh responsible for formulation and administration of the rules and regulations and laws relating to the local bodies (town areas, municipal councils and municipal corporations) and urban development in Uttar Pradesh.

Retired IAS Arvind Kumar Sharma serves as the departmental cabinet minister, and the Principal Secretary (Urban Development), an IAS officer, is the administrative head of the department.

== Functions ==
The department is responsible for making and implementing laws and policies relating to Urban Development. The Department of Urban Development, through the Directorate of Local Bodies, is also responsible for proper functioning of local bodies, especially the Municipal Corporations, by providing financial assistance and other type of grants to local bodies. In addition the department is also responsible for providing cities with proper sanitation, infrastructure and other civic amenities.

== Statutory, Autonomous and Attached bodies ==
- Uttar Pradesh Jal Nigam
- State Urban Development Agency (SUDA)
- Uttar Pradesh State Ganga River Conservation Authority
- Uttar Pradesh Urban Transport Directorate
- Directorate of Local Bodies
- Local bodies-
- 1. 17 Municipal Corporations
- 2. 200 Municipal Councils
- 3. 537 Town Areas

== Important officials ==
Ashutosh Tandon, is the Cabinet Minister responsible for Department of Urban Development while Girish Kumar Yadav is Minister of State in Department of Urban Development.

The department's administration is headed by the Principal Secretary, who is an IAS officer, who is assisted by six Special Secretaries, two Joint Secretaries, and seven Deputy/Under Secretaries. The current Principal Secretary (UD) is Manoj Kumar Singh.

=== Secretariat level ===
Important officials
Name	Designation
Manoj Kumar Singh	Principal Secretary
Dr. Anil Kumar Singh	Special Secretary
Hari Pratap Shahi	Special Secretary
Ram Niwas	Special Secretary
Umesh Pratap Singh	Special Secretary
Shailendra Kumar Singh	Special Secretary
Anil Kumar Bishnoi	Special Secretary

=== Head of Department Level ===
Heads of Department
Name	Position
Dr Anil Kumar Singh	Director, Local Bodies
Anil Kumar bajpaeyi	Managing Director, Uttar Pradesh Jal Nigam
Umesh pratap singh	Director, State Urban Development Agency
vacant	Director, Uttar Pradesh State Ganga River Conservation Authority
vacant	Director, Uttar Pradesh Urban Transport Directorate
