= Ashutosh Tandon =

Indian politician (1960–2023)

Minister of Urban Development Government of Uttar Pradesh
- In office 22 August 2019 – 25 March 2022
- Chief Minister: Yogi Adityanath
- Preceded by: Suresh Khanna
- Succeeded by: A. K. Sharma

Minister of Medical Education Government of Uttar Pradesh
- In office 19 March 2017 – 22 August 2019
- Chief Minister: Yogi Adityanath
- Succeeded by: Suresh Khanna

Minister of Technical Education Government of Uttar Pradesh
- In office 19 March 2017 – 22 August 2019
- Chief Minister: Yogi Adityanath
- Succeeded by: Kamal Rani Varun

Member of Uttar Pradesh Legislative Assembly
- In office 16 September 2014 – 9 November 2023
- Preceded by: Kalraj Mishra
- Succeeded by: O. P. Srivastava
- Constituency: Lucknow East

Personal details
- Born: 12 May 1960 Lucknow, Uttar Pradesh, India
- Died: 9 November 2023 (aged 63) Lucknow, Uttar Pradesh, India
- Party: Bharatiya Janata Party
- Spouse: Madhu Tandon (m. 1982)
- Children: 1
- Parent: Lalji Tandon
- Education: Bachelor of Arts
- Alma mater: Lucknow University
- Profession: Agriculture; Business

Ashutosh Tandon (12 May 1960 – 9 November 2023), also known as Gopal Tandon, was an Indian politician and was Minister of Urban Development, Overall Urban Development, Urban Employment and Poverty Alleviation in the Government of Uttar Pradesh. Tandon was also a member of the Uttar Pradesh Legislative Assembly from the Lucknow East constituency in Lucknow district. He was son of BJP's senior leader and former Governor of Madhya Pradesh Lal Ji Tandon.

== Personal life ==
Tandon was born on 12 May 1960 to politician Lalji Tandon in Lucknow, Uttar Pradesh. He graduated with a Bachelor of Arts degree from Lucknow University in 1980. He married Madhu Tandon on 6 May 1982, with whom he had a daughter.

Tandon died from heart failure after a prolonged illness at a private hospital in Lucknow on 9 November 2023 at the age of 63.

== Career ==
Tandon was appointed Director of Union Bank of India from 2001 to 2006.

In 2014, Tandon defeated Juhie Singh by 26,459 votes for the Lucknow East assembly seat.

In 2017, Ashutosh Tandon defeated SP-Congress joint candidate Anurag Bhadoria by record 79,230 votes. Tandon was appointed to the ministries of Technical and Medical Education.

In a portfolio reshuffle in August 2019, Tandon was allocated Urban Development Department.

In 2022 Uttar Pradesh Legislative Assembly election, Tandon won for the third time from Lucknow East constituency, defeating Samajwadi Party's Anurag Bhadouria by 49017 votes.

== See also ==
- Yogi Adityanath ministry (2017–)
