= O. P. Srivastava =

Indian politician

Om Prakash Srivastava

Member of Uttar Pradesh Legislative Assembly
- Incumbent
- Assumed office June 4, 2024
- Preceded by: Ashutosh Tandon
- Constituency: Lucknow East

Personal details
- Born: 1957 (age 67–68)
- Political party: Bharatiya Janata Party

Om Prakash Srivastava is an Indian politician from the BJP and member of Uttar Pradesh Legislative Assembly from Lucknow East constituency of Lucknow district.
