= A. K. Sharma =

Indian politician and former IAS

Arvind Kumar Sharma
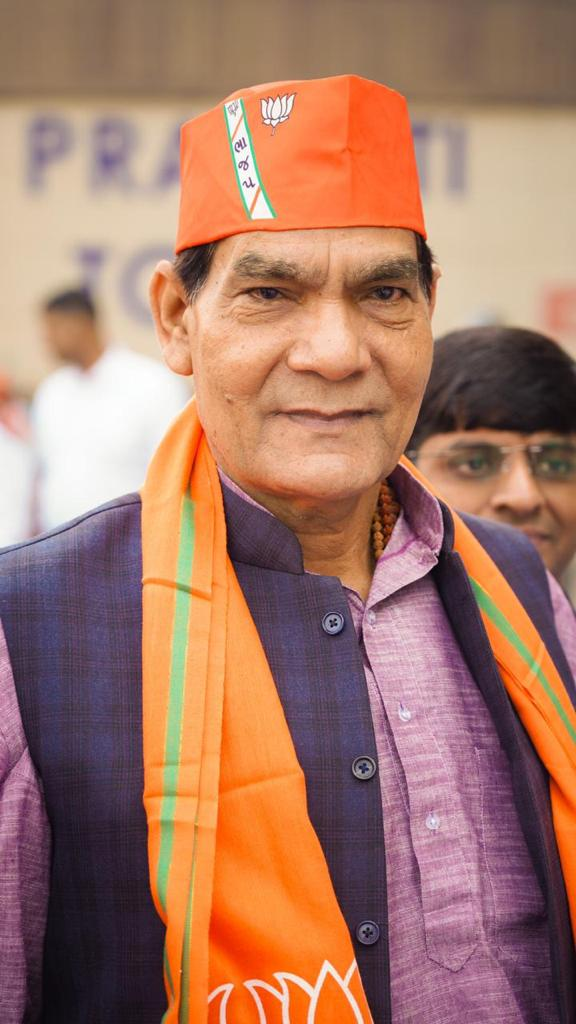

Minister of Urban Development Government of Uttar Pradesh
- Incumbent
- Assumed office 25 March 2022
- Chief Minister: Yogi Adityanath
- Preceded by: Ashutosh Tandon

Minister of Energy Government of Uttar Pradesh
- Incumbent
- Assumed office 25 March 2022
- Chief Minister: Yogi Adityanath
- Preceded by: Shrikant Sharma

Member of Uttar Pradesh Legislative Council
- Incumbent
- Assumed office 31 January 2021
- Constituency: elected by Legislative Assembly members

Personal details
- Born: Arvind Kumar Sharma; 11 July 1962 (age 64) Mau, Uttar Pradesh, India
- Party: Bharatiya Janata Party
- Profession: IAS officer, Politician
- Website: Official website

Arvind Kumar Sharma (born 11 July 1962) is an Indian politician from Uttar Pradesh, former Indian Administrative Service (IAS) officer and bureaucrat of 1988 batch. He is currently a Cabinet Minister in Uttar Pradesh. Before joining politics, Sharma was an IAS officer from Gujarat Cadre of the 1988 batch. Sharma was an aide of Prime Minister of India Narendra Modi, with whom he had worked for 20 years. He was also CEO, Gujarat Infrastructure Development Board and has also managed multiple Vibrant Gujarat summits. He joined the Prime Minister's Office as a Joint Secretary in 2014 and was elevated to the Additional Secretary rank in 2017. In 2019, he moved out of the PMO to become a secretary in the Ministry of Micro, Small and Medium Enterprises but took voluntary retirement in January 2021.

== Early life and education ==
Arvind Kumar Sharma was born in Uttar Pradesh’s Mau district to Shri Shivmurti Sharma and Shrimati Sharma. He completed schooling from his home district before graduating from Allahabad University. He pursued a master's degree in political science before joining the civil services.

== Work in Gujarat ==
In 1988, Sharma became a civil servant and started his career as an IAS officer with the Gujarat cadre. His first posting was as a Sub-Divisional Magistrate (SDM). In 1995, he took charge as the District Magistrate of Mehsana. After Narendra Modi came to power in Gujarat in 2001, Sharma joined the Chief Minister’s Office as a Secretary and remained there till 2014 before shifting to the Centre. Sharma worked in the Government of Gujarat as District Development Officer in Vadodara, Managing Director of Industrial Extension Bureau, and the CEO of Gujarat Infrastructure Development Board (GIDB). He set up the Gujarat section of the dedicated freight corridor and Delhi-Mumbai Industrial Corridor as well as Dholera Special Investment Region.

== Work in PMO ==
Arvind Kumar Sharma remained as Secretary in Chief Minister’s Office till 2014 when Narendra Modi became the Prime Minister. He then joined the PMO as a Joint Secretary in 2014 and was elevated to the Additional Secretary rank in 2017. After his long stint in the PMO, Sharma was entrusted with the charge of micro, small and medium enterprises (MSME) ministry.

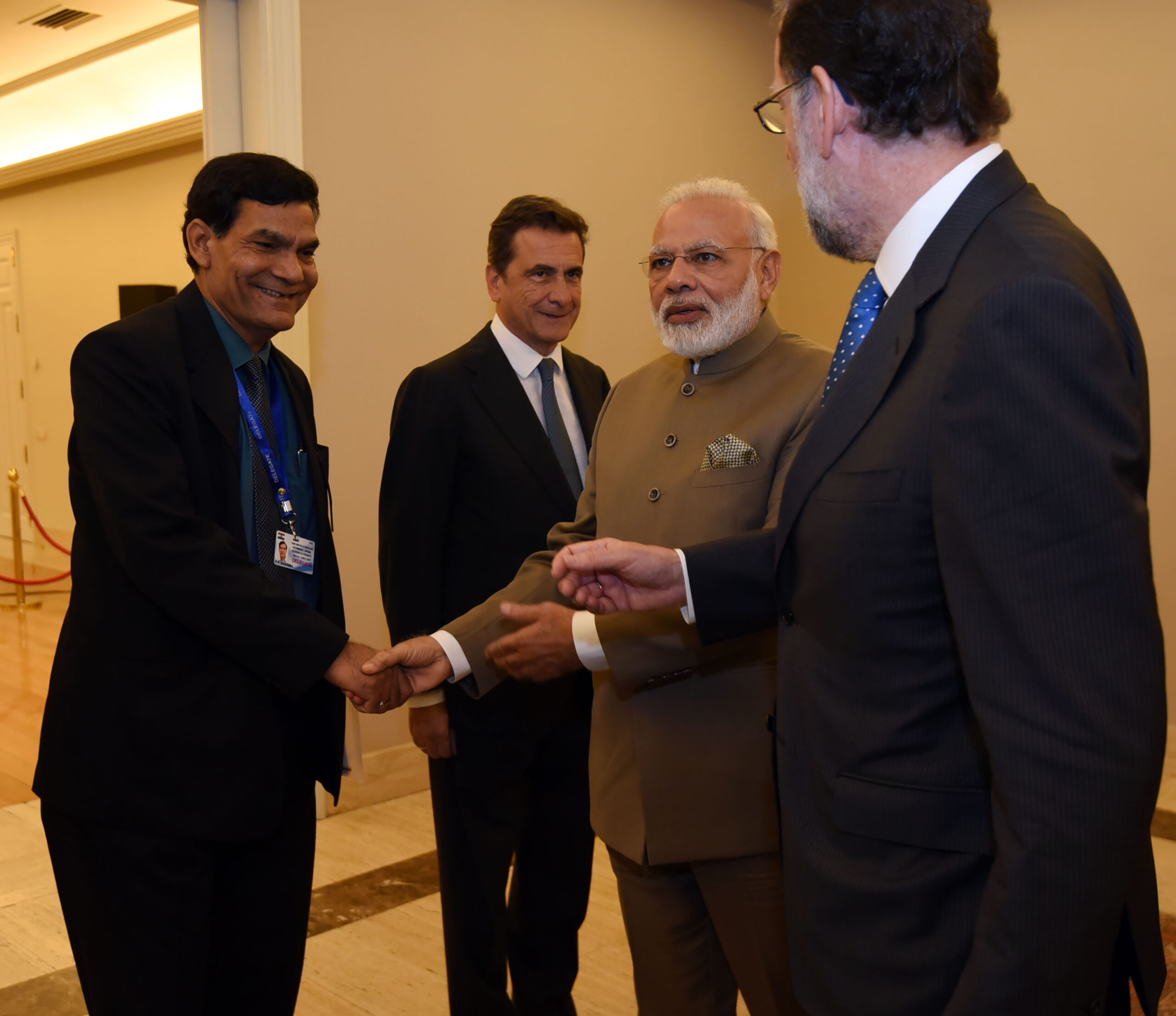
A K Sharma with PM Narendra Modi

== Work in MSME ==
MSME-Champions (Creation and Harmonious Application of Modern Processes for Increasing the Output and National Strength) is an ICT-based (Information and Communication Technology) platform launched by the Ministry of Micro, Small and Medium Enterprises, Government of India. It was launched on 9 May 2020 with the objective of providing support to Micro, Small and Medium Enterprises (MSMEs) during challenging circumstances and assisting them in becoming competitive at national and international levels.

The idea for developing an ICT-based support system was proposed by A. K. Sharma after assuming charge as Secretary of the Ministry of Micro, Small and Medium Enterprises on the evening of 30 April 2020. The MSME-Champions portal was developed as an integrated platform to address the concerns of MSMEs and provide assistance related to areas such as grievance resolution, guidance, finance, market access, and technology adoption.

== Voluntary retirement and entry into politics ==
Arvind Kumar Sharma sought retirement in January 2021 from civil services, 18 months before his due retirement. A few days after his voluntary retirement, Sharma joined the Bharatiya Janata Party (BJP) in Uttar Pradesh. He was appointed as a vice-president of the Uttar Pradesh BJP unit and was elected as a Member of the Legislative Council (MLC) of Uttar Pradesh.

In 2021 he worked on the COVID-19 epidemic in Varanasi, during which COVID cases in the city were reduced from over 1,000 to under 300. Sharma offered 53,000 medical kits and other aid to manage CSR funds. He also supported other functionaries of BJP to in COVID mitigation work, and helped authorities to disseminate alternative medicine in the most affected areas. He also led the establishment of the Kashi COVID response center.

== Cabinet Minister of UP ==
Arvind Kumar Sharma (A. K. Sharma) is a Cabinet Minister in the Government of Uttar Pradesh. He holds the portfolios of Urban Development, Urban Employment and Poverty Alleviation, Energy, and Additional Sources of Energy in the Yogi Adityanath government.

SAMBHAV Portal-

As Minister in charge of the Urban Development and Energy departments of the Government of Uttar Pradesh, A. K. Sharma launched the SAMBHAV (Systematic Administration Mechanism for Bringing Happiness and Value) portal. The ICT-based platform was introduced to facilitate the monitoring and redressal of public grievances and to oversee the implementation of government programmes, schemes, projects, and policies related to the Urban Development and Energy departments. The portal was launched with the stated objective of improving transparency, accountability, and the efficiency of public service delivery.

During his tenure as Uttar Pradesh's Energy Minister, the state recorded a peak power supply of 31,804 MW in May 2026. This was the highest peak electricity supply achieved by any Indian state at the time, making Uttar Pradesh the first state in the country to cross the 31,800 MW mark in peak power supply.
