= Armaan Khan (politician) =

Member of the Uttar Pradesh Legislative Assembly

Member of the Uttar Pradesh Legislative Assembly
- Incumbent
- Assumed office March 2022
- Preceded by: Suresh Kumar Srivastava
- Constituency: Lucknow West

Personal details
- Born: Lucknow, Uttar Pradesh
- Party: Samajwadi Party
- Spouse: Shagufta Khan
- Parent: Mohd Hasan Khan (father)
- Education: Lucknow University
- Occupation: Politician
- Profession: Business

Armaan Khan is an Indian politician and a member of the 18th Legislative Assembly of Uttar Pradesh, representing the Lucknow West Assembly constituency of Uttar Pradesh. He is a member of the Samajwadi Party, a socialist political party in India. Armaan Khan was born in Lucknow, Uttar Pradesh, to a Muslim family of Mohd Hasan Khan. He married Shagufta Khan. Armaan Khan completed his graduation in 2007 from Shia Degree College, a college affiliated with Lucknow University.

== Posts held ==
#	From	To	Position	Comments
03	2022	Incumbent	Member, 18th Legislative Assembly	elected first time

== See also ==
- 18th Uttar Pradesh Assembly
- Lucknow West Assembly constituency
- Uttar Pradesh Legislative Assembly
