= Suresh Kumar Khanna =

Indian politician

Minister of Finance Government of Uttar Pradesh
- Incumbent
- Assumed office 21 August 2019
- Chief Minister: Yogi Adityanath
- Preceded by: Rajesh Agarwal

Minister of Medical Education Government of Uttar Pradesh
- In office 21 August 2019 – 25 March 2022
- Chief Minister: Yogi Adityanath
- Preceded by: Ashutosh Tandon
- Succeeded by: Brajesh Pathak

Minister of Parliamentary Affairs Government of Uttar Pradesh
- Incumbent
- Assumed office 19 March 2017
- Chief Minister: Yogi Adityanath
- Preceded by: Azam Khan

Minister of Urban Development Government of Uttar Pradesh
- In office 19 March 2017 – 21 August 2019
- Chief Minister: Yogi Adityanath
- Succeeded by: Ashutosh Tandon

Minister of Tourism Government of Uttar Pradesh
- In office 11 October 2002 – 29 August 2003
- Chief Minister: Mayawati
- Preceded by: Lalji Tandon
- Succeeded by: Naresh Agrawal

Minister of Planning & Statistics Government of Uttar Pradesh
- In office 12 November 1999 – 8 March 2002
- Chief Minister: Ram Prakash Gupta; Rajnath Singh
- Preceded by: Mahendra Nath Pandey

Minister of state for Housing Government of Uttar Pradesh
- In office 27 October 1997 – 12 November 1999
- Chief Minister: Kalyan Singh
- Minister: Lalji Tandon

Minister of state for Urban Development Government of Uttar Pradesh
- In office 24 June 1991 – 6 December 1992
- Chief Minister: Kalyan Singh
- Minister: Prem Lata Katiyar

Member of Uttar Pradesh Legislative Assembly
- Incumbent
- Assumed office 1989
- Preceded by: Nawab Sikander Ali Khan
- Constituency: Shahjahanpur

Personal details
- Born: 6 May 1953 (age 73) Shahjahanpur, Uttar Pradesh, India
- Party: Bharatiya Janata Party
- Parent: Ram Narayan Khanna (father)
- Education: LLB
- Alma mater: Agra university University of Lucknow
- Profession: Politician, Lawyer

Suresh Kumar Khanna (born 6 May 1953) is an Indian politician and a member of the 10th, 11th, 12th, 13th, 14th, 15th, 16th, 17th and 18th Uttar Pradesh Assembly in India. Currently he is serving as Cabinet Minister for Finance, Parliamentary affairs Departments in Yogi Adityanath ministry. He represents the Shahjahanpur constituency of Uttar Pradesh and is a member of the Bharatiya Janta Party political party. He has won 9 times MLA election consecutively in his constituency.

== Early life and education ==
Khanna was born 6 May 1953 in Shahjahanpur district, in a Hindu Khatri family to his father Ram Narayan Khanna. He completed his graduation from Dr. Bhimrao Ambedkar University and then pursued his LL.B at the University of Lucknow.

== Political career ==
Suresh Kumar Khanna has been an MLA for nine straight terms, a record for UP Assembly. He has represented the Shahjahanpur constituency during all his terms and is a member of the Bharatiya Janata Party political party.

On 19 March 2017, he was appointed Cabinet Minister for Urban Development and Parliamentary Affairs in Yogi Adityanath ministry.

On 21 August 2019, after first cabinet expansion of Yogi Adityanath his ministry department changed as Minister of Finance, Parliamentary affairs and Medical Education Departments.

== Posts held ==
#	From	To	Position	Comments
01	March 2022	Incumbent	Deputy Leader of the House,18th Uttar Pradesh Assembly	
02	March 2022	Incumbent	Member, 18th Uttar Pradesh Assembly	
03	August 2019	March 2022	Cabinet Minister for Finance, Parliamentary affairs and Medical Education Departments	Yogi Adityanath ministry
04	March 2017	March 2022	Member, 17th Legislative Assembly	
05	March 2017	August 2019	Cabinet Minister for Urban development and Legislative Affairs	Yogi Adityanath ministry
06	March 2012	March 2017	Member, 16th Legislative Assembly	
07	May 2007	March 2012	Member, 15th Legislative Assembly	
08	October 2002	August 2003	Cabinet Minister for Tourism	Mayawati Ministry
09	February 2002	May 2007	Member, 14th Legislative Assembly	
10	November 1999	March 2002	Cabinet Minister for Planning & Statistics	Ram Prakash Gupta & Rajnath Singh Ministry
11	October 1997	November 1999	Minister of State, for Housing	Kalyan Singh Ministry
12	February 1996	May 2002	Member, 13th Legislative Assembly	
13	December 1993	October 1995	Member, 12th Legislative Assembly	
14	June 1991	December 1992	Minister of State, for Urban Development	Kalyan Singh Ministry
15	June 1991	December 1992	Member, 11th Legislative Assembly	
16	December 1989	April 1991	Member, 10th Legislative Assembly	

== See also ==
- Shahjahanpur (Assembly constituency)
- Sixteenth Legislative Assembly of Uttar Pradesh
- Uttar Pradesh Legislative Assembly
