= Syed Wazir Hasan =

Indian politician and judge (1874–1948)

Sir Syed Wazir Hasan

Chief Justice of Awadh Chief Court
- In office 1930–1934

Personal details
- Born: 14 May 1874 Jaunpur, North-Western Provinces, British India
- Died: August 1948 (aged 74) Lucknow, United Provinces, India
- Resting place: Lucknow
- Party: All-India Muslim League
- Profession: Lawyer, politician

Sir Syed Wazir Hasan (14 May 1874 – August 1948) was an Indian jurist and Secretary and later President of the All-India Muslim League. A practitioner in the Judicial Commissioner's Court, he was the first Indian Chief Justice of the Awadh Chief Court (1930–1934). His Presidential address at the 24th Session, of Muslim League, held on 11–12 April 1936 in Bombay, was noted for its call of Hindu-Muslim unity, before the call for separate Muslim state was raised by Muhammad Ali Jinnah the very next year.

During Indian Independence movement, he was the counsel for Hindustan Times newspaper, for the noted 'Hindustan Times Contempt Case', August–November 1941 at Allahabad High Court.

== Family and education ==
Born in 1873 to Syed Zaheer, who belonged to a family that was landed gentry from the Jaunpur district, he was expected to look after the estate. But he saw the opportunities that an English education would bring, quarrelled with his father and left for Aligarh Muslim University to study law, and also at Muir Central College, Allahabad. He had 4 brothers: Syed Jafar Hasan, Syed Shabbir Hasan, a prominent poet of his time, also known as "Qateel Lakhnawi", Syed Asghar Hasan, and Syed Kazim Hasan. He had 2 sisters (names unknown). His sons were Sajjad Zaheer and Syed Ali Zaheer. Professor Saiyid Nurul Hasan was his grandson.

== Career ==
He had incisive intelligence and great knowledge and ability. As the Secretary of All-India Muslim League, his meeting with Maulana Azad proved decisive for the party as after it for the first time in its history at the April 1913 Annual Session at Lucknow under Jinnah as the President, it changed its motto from "the attainment of suitable Self-Government for India" instead of "loyalty to British Government and the attainment of the rights of the Muslims", and the subsequent signing of Lucknow Pact with Indian National Congress.

He also had a large volume of work and was the first Indian member of the Oudh Bar Association to be elevated as Additional Judicial Commissioner in 1921. He continued as such till the Oudh Chief Court came into being in 1925, and he became a Justice of the Court. His judgments spoke volumes of his erudition and it is said that none of his judgments were ever upset by the Privy Council. He became the Chief Judge of the Chief Court in 1930 and retired in 1934. After retirement he shifted to Allahabad to practice. He lived like any Taluqdar, and in later life dabbled in politics. He was knighted in the imperial 1932 New Year Honours list and invested with his knighthood by the Viceroy of India in New Delhi on 4 March of that year.

His successful career proved him right and getting a good education became the rule in the family. His daughters Fatima Zehra and Noor Zehra were among the first students to get enrolled in the newly established Muslim School for Girls, later known as Karamat Hussain College. His son Syed Ali Zaheer was a politician and member of the First Indian Cabinet, under Jawahar Lal Nehru, and Syed Sajjad Zaheer (1904–1973) was a renowned Urdu writer, Marxist thinker and revolutionary. His other children were Syed Baquar, Syed Hussain, Nur Zehra, Nur Fatima, and Syed Hasan.

== Personal life ==
His wife Lady Wazir Hasan, gave up purdah in 1930, during the Non-co-operation movement of Gandhi She gave away all her French chiffon saris and started wearing khadi and weaving on a charkha. She was from Bhopal, and was the first girl to do a 'Middle' Exam, Class VI or Middle School.

The Muslim League Presidential address was delivered by Sir Wazir Hasan at the Bombay Session held on 11–12 April 1936. He died in Lucknow in August 1947 and was buried there as well.
