= Ravidas Mehrotra =

Indian politician (born 1955)

Member of the Uttar Pradesh legislative assembly
- Incumbent
- Assumed office 10 March 2022
- Preceded by: Brajesh Pathak
- Constituency: Lucknow Central
- In office 6 March 2012 – 11 March 2017
- Preceded by: Suresh Kumar Srivastava
- Succeeded by: Brajesh Pathak
- Constituency: Lucknow Central
- In office 1989–1991
- Preceded by: Swaroop Kumari Bakshi
- Succeeded by: Bhagwati Prasad Shukla
- Constituency: Lucknow East

Personal details
- Born: 21 April 1955 (age 70); Lucknow, Uttar Pradesh, India
- Political party: Samajwadi Party
- Spouse: Rashmi Mehrotra (m. 1981)
- Children: 2
- Education: L. L. B.
- Alma mater: Lucknow University

Ravidas Mehrotra (born 21 April 1955) is an Indian politician and former cabinet minister in the Government of Uttar Pradesh led by Akhilesh Yadav. He was member of Tenth and Sixteenth Legislative Assembly of Uttar Pradesh.
