= Anurag Bhadouria =

Indian politician

National Spokesperson
- Incumbent
- Assumed office 2017

Personal details
- Born: 8 August 1971 (age 54) Lucknow, Uttar Pradesh, India
- Party: Samajwadi Party
- Spouse: Anupama Saroj
- Profession: Politician

Anurag Bhadouria (born 8 August 1971) is an Indian politician and member of the Samajwadi Party. He is the National Spokesperson of Samajwadi Party. Anurag Bhadouria is also one of the close leaders to Samajwadi Party Supremo Akhilesh Yadav.

== Early life and education ==
Anurag received his Management in executive business management from Indian management Institute (IIM Kolkata). He is also PhD holder. He also did "Visharad" in flute from Bhatkhande University, Lucknow.

== Political career ==
Anurag was awarded the status of State Minister Sports during the period of Akhilesh Yadav government. Anurag contested his first Assembly election in 2017 Samajwadi Party Congress alliance from Lucknow east Constituency on the symbol of Congress party.

Anurag came into limelight when he organised Indian Gramin Cricket League, an organisation constituted with an objective of promoting and tapping young rural sport talent of country. He has been organising league cricket matches for years in different states of country and motivating boys by providing them with basic cricket facilities and paraphernalia. Winners are awarded cash, trophies, bikes and even motorcycles.
