= Ram Naresh Rawat =

Indian politician (1962–2022)

MLA, 17th Legislative Assembly
- In office 2017–2022
- Succeeded by: Shyam Sunder Bharti
- Constituency: Bachhrawan, Rae Bareli, Uttar Pradesh

Personal details
- Born: 7 May 1962 Daulatpur, Uttar Pradesh, India
- Died: 4 September 2022 (aged 60) Delhi, India
- Party: Bharatiya Janata Party
- Occupation: MLA
- Profession: Politician social work

Ram Naresh Rawat (7 May 1962 – 4 September 2022) was an Indian politician and a member of 17th Legislative Assembly, Uttar Pradesh of India. He represented the ‘Bachhrawan’ constituency in Rae Bareli district of Uttar Pradesh.

== Political career ==
Ram Naresh Rawat contested Uttar Pradesh Assembly Election as Bharatiya Janata Party candidate and defeated his close contestant Shahab Sharan from Indian National Congress with a margin of 22,309 votes. He was born in the year 1962 to Ram Autar Rawat in a Schedule Caste family belonging to Pasi community.

== Posts held ==
#	From	To	Position	Comments
01	2017	2022	Member, 17th Legislative Assembly	
02	2006	2012	Member of Legislative Council	
03	1987	1988	National youth award winner	For social works
