= Bhagwati Prasad Shukla =

Indian politician

Bhagwati Prasad Shukla is an Indian politician and member of the Bharatiya Janata Party. Shukla was a member of the Uttar Pradesh Legislative Assembly from the Lucknow East constituency in Lucknow district.
