= Shakir Ali =

Shakir Ali may refer to:

- Shakir Ali (barrister) (1879–1962), Indian lawyer and politician
- Shakir Ali (artist) (1914–1975), Pakistani artist and teacher
- Shakir Ali (politician) (1953–2020), Indian politician from Uttar Pradesh
