= Shyam Sunder Bharti =

Member of the Uttar Pradesh Legislative Assembly

Member of Uttar Pradesh Legislative Assembly
- Incumbent
- Assumed office March 2022
- Preceded by: Ram Naresh Rawat
- Constituency: Bachhrawan

Personal details
- Born: 1 March 1959 (age 67) Barabanki, Uttar Pradesh
- Party: Samajwadi Party
- Profession: Politician

Shyam Sunder Bharti is an Indian politician, farmer, and a member of the 18th Uttar Pradesh Assembly from the Bachhrawan Assembly constituency of the Raebareli district. He is a member of the Samajwadi Party.

== Early life ==
Shyam Sunder Bharti was born on 1 March 1959 in Thakurpur, Barabanki, Uttar Pradesh, to a Hindu family of Bhagwandin. He married Chandrakali on 30 June 1985, and they had four children.

== See also ==
- Samajwadi Party
- 18th Uttar Pradesh Assembly
- Bachhrawan Assembly constituency
