= MSME-Champions =

Grievance management and information portal for MSME

MSME-Champions is a technology-driven centralized control room, grievance management, and information platform launched by the Ministry of Micro, Small and Medium Enterprises (MSME) under Government of India. The Prime Minister of India, Narendra Modi launched the Champions portal on 9 May 2020. Champions, which stands for "Creation and Harmonious Application of Modern Processes for Increasing the Output and National Strength". The objective of the portal is to provide a one-stop solution to MSMEs and help small units grow big by resolving their grievances, supporting them in various aspects of the trade. The physical infrastructure for the control room is created in one of the spare rooms of the ministry's building in record time. The portal designed with the confluence of various ICT tools, the system also leverages cutting edge technologies like Artificial intelligence and Machine learning. The portal was designed and created inhouse with the help of National Informatics Center (NIC). Since the launch of the portal, around 50,000 grievances filed by the MSMEs were resolved within five weeks.
