= Syed Ali Zaheer =

Ali Zaheer علّی ظہیر
- Born: 1896; Lucknow, India
- Died: 1983
- Occupations: Lawyer, politician

Syed Ali Zaheer (1896–1983) سیّد علّی ظہیر was an Indian politician and law minister in the first cabinet formed by Prime Minister Jawaharlal Nehru.

== Early and family life ==
He was born as one of the four sons of Sir Syed Wazir Hasan at Kalanpur, Jaunpur. The family belonged to the Shia sect of Islam.

== Career ==
Zaheer began his career as a barrister in the Chiefs Court of Oudh (Awadh), based in Lucknow. He took interest in politics at an early age and joined the Indian National Congress. He selected Congress as they were leading India's struggle for independence from Britain.

=== Municipal politics ===
In the 1930s and 1940s, actively encouraged by the policy of Divide and Rule, communalism was at its peak in India. Awadh, dominated by vastly rich Muslim landlords ruling an overwhelmingly Hindu peasantry, had become a hotbed of Muslim separatism, and indeed the main source of funding for the All-India Muslim League, which wanted to partition India and create Pakistan.

Since many of the land-owners of the region were Muslims, much of provincial politics in Awadh during the days of the British Raj was dominated by them. Lucknow's was represented by the political rivalry between Chaudhry Khaliq-uz-zaman, a Sunni Muslim League leader, and Syed Ali Zaheer, a Shia leader and a member of the Congress. Both fought elections for the Lucknow Municipal Board and the Congress won. Zaheer thus became Municipal Commissioner of Lucknow in the early 1940s.

=== Later career ===
Since he held an important position as a member of the Congress, Zaheer refused to jump ship and join the Muslim League as many of his colleagues did. He was rewarded for this expedient loyalty in 1946 with the talks of independence beginning in earnest.

When the provisional government of India was formed, in 1946, as a prelude to independence, Zaheer was appointed Law Minister. Later, he was appointed India's ambassador to Iran, again by Jawaharlal Nehru. After his return, he resumed his legal practice.

Later, he became the Law Minister of Uttar Pradesh for two terms and also the Chairman of Uttar Pradesh Pay Commission.

Though he was a lifelong Congressman Zaheer briefly left the Congress during the general elections of 1977 and joined Babu Jagjivan Ram's Congress for Democracy (CFD).

He remained the president of the Shia Degree College Management Committee and was succeeded by his son Kazim Zaheer to that post.

Syed Ali Zaheer was buried in Daliganj Karbala, which is close to the Shia College there.
