= Suresh Srivastava =

Indian politician (1944–2021)

Suresh Kumar Srivastava

Member of Legislative Assembly, Uttar Pradesh
- In office 11 March 2017 – 23 April 2021
- Preceded by: Mohammad Rehan Naeem
- Succeeded by: Armaan Khan
- Constituency: Lucknow West
- In office 1996–2012
- Preceded by: Ram Prakash
- Succeeded by: Ravidas Mehrotra
- Constituency: Lucknow Central

Personal details
- Born: 6 June 1944; Balrampur, United Provinces, British India
- Died: 23 April 2021 (aged 76); Lucknow, Uttar Pradesh, India
- Political party: Bharatiya Janata Party
- Spouse: Malti Srivastava (m. 1972)
- Children: Two Sons, One Daughter
- Education: Post Graduate Diploma in Criminology
- Profession: Politician, Lawyer

Suresh Kumar Srivastava was an Indian politician and member of Uttar Pradesh Legislative Assembly. He won Lucknow Central assembly seat three times as a BJP candidate and represented Lucknow West constituency. He was also a professional lawyer. Srivastava died on 23 April 2021, from COVID-19.

== Political career ==
Srivastava was a member of 17th Legislative Assembly, Uttar Pradesh of India. He represented the ‘Lucknow west’ constituency in Lucknow district of Uttar Pradesh.

== Posts held ==
#	From	To	Position	Comments
01	2017	2021	Member, 17th Legislative Assembly	
