= Vidya Sagar Gupta =

Indian politician

Vidya Sagar Gupta is an Indian politician and member of the Bharatiya Janata Party. Gupta was a member of the Uttar Pradesh Legislative Assembly from the Lucknow East constituency in Lucknow district. Mr. Gupta was a MLA for a consecutive 3 terms from 1996 to 2012 although the BJP could not form its government but Gupta kept winning. Later in 2019 in the Yogi Adityanath led BJP government he was nominated as a chairman in the board of technical education U.P. for a term of 3 years also having the status of a minister of state [MOS].
