= Ram Lal Akela =

Indian politician (born 1953)

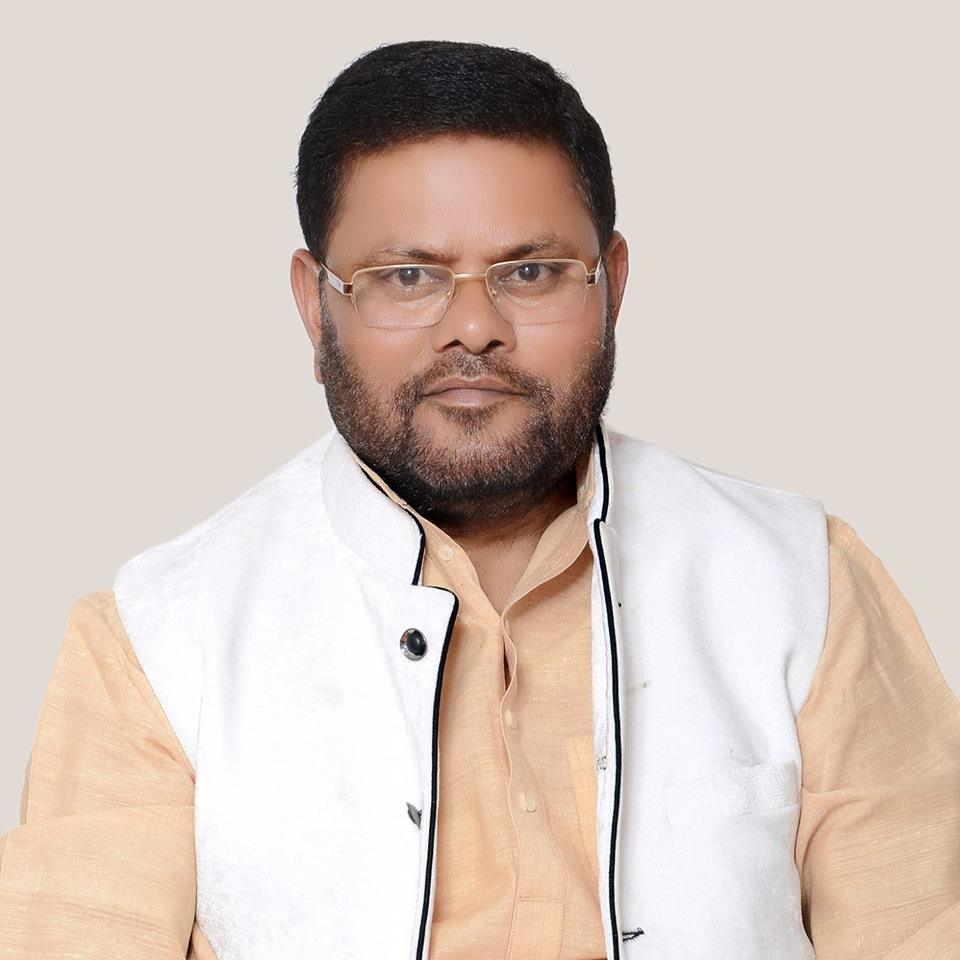

Members of the Uttar Pradesh Legislative Assembly
- In office 15 March 2012 – 2017
- Constituency: Bachhrawan, Raebareli

Personal details
- Born: 21 January 1953 (age 73) Raebareli, Uttar Pradesh, India
- Party: Samajwadi Party
- Spouse: Shanti Akela
- Children: 3 sons
- Profession: Politician

Ram Lal Akela (born 21 January 1953) is Former Member of legislative assembly From Bachhrawan Vidhansabha of Raebareli . He is an Indian politician and member of the Samajwadi Party.

In 2013, he was suspended by Samajwadi Party, national president Akhilesh yadav for anti party activities.

== Early life and education ==
Akela was born in an extremely poor Dalit family. Due to extreme poverty, every member of the Akela family performed labour in order to survive and fight poverty. Akela got his primary education in a primary school of his village.

== Career ==
After completing his higher education, he worked as an assembly operator in Indian telephone industries. Possessing a high degree of leadership capability, Akela was also selected as the union secretary of ITI.

== Ambedkar Samajotthan Mission ==
During his service period in ITI, Akela laid the foundation of Ambedkar Samajotthan Mission in 1980 in order to help Dalits.

== Leadership ==
Inspired by the works of Indira Gandhi, Akela took the membership of the Indian National Congress in 1982. Influenced by his capabilities, the party appointed him as the chairman of the SC/ST Community of Uttar Pradesh.

Despite his numerous works, he did not receive the desired motivation and respect, after which he left the congress in 1991. He then acquired the membership of Samajwadi party and was made the general secretary of Raebareli district. In 1993, Akela contested the election from Bachhrawan legislative assembly against sitting MLA of Congress Rajaram Tyagi, but lost by a minor difference of 3000 votes.

Influenced by Akela's stamina, Samajwadi Party president at the time, Mulayam Singh Yadav, gave him the ticket from the legislative assembly of Bachhrawan in 2002. This time Akela won by defeating the Congress MLA who contested against him. But again in 2007, he lost the legislative assembly election with a minute difference in votes. Consecutively, third time, in 2012 Akela was made the Samajwadi Party contestant by Mulayam Singh Yadav. Akela proved to be a winner again by acquiring a huge number of votes. Overjoyed by the victory in the region over Congress, CM Akhilesh Yadav awarded Ramlal Akela with the post of chairman of the S.C./S.T. Community in Uttar Pradesh.
