= Lalji Tandon =

Indian politician (1935–2020)

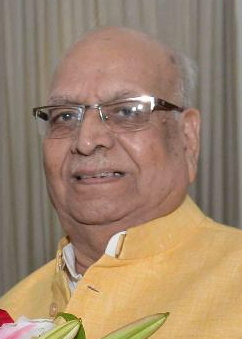
- Tandon in 2018

Governor of Madhya Pradesh
- In office 29 July 2019 – 1 July 2020
- Chief Minister: Kamal Nath; Shivraj Singh Chouhan
- Preceded by: Anandiben Patel
- Succeeded by: Anandiben Patel (additional charge)

Governor of Bihar
- In office 23 August 2018 – 28 July 2019
- Chief Minister: Nitish Kumar
- Preceded by: Satya Pal Malik
- Succeeded by: Phagu Chauhan

Member of Parliament, Lok Sabha
- In office 16 May 2009 – 16 May 2014
- Preceded by: Atal Bihari Vajpayee
- Succeeded by: Rajnath Singh
- Constituency: Lucknow

Leader of the Opposition Uttar Pradesh Legislative Assembly
- In office 7 September 2003 – 13 May 2007
- Chief Minister: Mulayam Singh Yadav
- Preceded by: Swami Prasad Maurya
- Succeeded by: Mulayam Singh Yadav

Minister of Urban Development & Housing Government of Uttar Pradesh
- In office 3 May 2002 – 29 August 2003
- Chief Minister: Mayawati
- Succeeded by: Azam Khan
- In office 21 March 1997 – 8 March 2002
- Chief Minister: Mayawati; Kalyan Singh; Ram Prakash Gupta; Rajnath Singh
- Preceded by: Rama Shankar Kaushik

Minister of Power Government of Uttar Pradesh
- In office 24 June 1991 – 6 December 1992
- Chief Minister: Kalyan Singh

Leader of the House Uttar Pradesh Legislative Council
- In office 18 January 1998 – 6 March 2002
- Chief Minister: Kalyan Singh; Ram Prakash Gupta; Rajnath Singh
- Preceded by: R. K. Chaudhary
- Succeeded by: Swami Prasad Maurya
- In office 3 July 1991 – 5 December 1992
- Chief Minister: Kalyan Singh
- Preceded by: Rama Shankar Kaushik
- Succeeded by: Rama Shankar Kaushik

Member of Uttar Pradesh Legislative Assembly
- In office 1996–2009
- Preceded by: Ram Kumar Shukla
- Succeeded by: Shyam Kishore Shukla
- Constituency: Lucknow West

Member of Uttar Pradesh Legislative Council
- In office 1990–1996
- Constituency: elected by Legislative Assembly members
- In office 1978–1984
- Constituency: elected by Legislative Assembly members

Personal details
- Born: 12 April 1935 Lucknow, United Provinces, British India
- Died: 21 July 2020 (aged 85) Lucknow, Uttar Pradesh, India
- Party: Bharatiya Janta Party
- Spouse: Krishna Tandon (m. 1958)
- Children: 3; including Ashutosh
- Education: Kalicharan Degree College, Lucknow University

Lalji Tandon (12 April 1935 – 21 July 2020) was an Indian politician who served as the 18th Governor of Madhya Pradesh and 28th Governor of Bihar. He had also served as a member of parliament from 1996 until 2014 and as the Leader of the Opposition of the Legislative Assembly of Uttar Pradesh from 2003 until 2007. He was a member of Bharatiya Janata Party (BJP) and a protégé of Atal Bihari Vajpayee.

== Early life ==
Tandon was born in Chowk village in Lucknow, United Provinces, British India to Shivnarayan Tandon and Annpurna Devi. He graduated from Kalicharan Degree College. Tandon married Krishna Tandon on 26 February 1958, with whom he had three sons.

== Career ==
Tandon was a member of Uttar Pradesh Vidhan Parishad (Legislative Council) for two terms, from 1978 until 1984 and remained the Leader of the House, of the Council from 1990 to 1996. Subsequently, he remained a member of Legislative Assembly (MLA) for three terms, 1996–2009, and remained the Leader of Opposition in the Assembly from 2003 to 2007. He had also served as Urban Development minister in the Uttar Pradesh cabinet under Mayawati (in the BSP-BJP alliance), and also in the Kalyan Singh ministry earlier.

Tandon was the leader of opposition in the Uttar Pradesh Legislative Assembly from 2003 to 2007.

On his birthday in April 2004, he was distributing free saris to poor women when a stampede broke out, killing 21 people. He was cleared of wrongdoing in this matter.

In May 2009, he was elected to the 15th Lok Sabha from Lucknow by a margin over 40,000 votes over Rita Bahuguna Joshi of Indian National Congress. The seat was earlier held by former BJP President Atal Bihari Vajpayee since 1991 for four consecutive terms. Despite enormous electoral spending, Akhilesh Das of the Bahujan Samaj Party (BSP) polled third, trailing by 70,000 votes.

As a Governor of Bihar, he was praised for streamlining academic activities of the state universities.

On 20 July 2019, he was appointed the 18th Governor of Madhya Pradesh, replacing Anandiben Patel.

== Other works ==
In 2018, Tandon wrote a book Ankaha Lucknow which was launched by the Vice-President of India Venkaiah Naidu.

== Death ==
Tandon died on 21 July 2020 at Medanta Hospital, Lucknow, from Covid-19, at the age of 85. His son Ashutosh Tandon announced his death.

== Legacy ==
Lalji Tandon Foundation was formed in October 2020. This foundation will be chaired by Gopal Tandon and will implement public services.

In July 2020, two roads in Uttar Pradesh were proposed to be named after Tandon. In December 2020, in another proposal, a boxing hall bearing the name of Tandon is to be built in Chowk Stadium, Lucknow.

Chancellor’s award to provide fillip to ‘best’ colleges, universities started by Chancellor Lalji Tandon.

Rajnath Singh unveiled statue of Lalji Tandon on his first death anniversary in Lucknow in July 2021. Another statue was unveiled by Yogi Adityanath on Tandon's birth anniversary in Apr 2023.

On 25 July 2023, Lucknow Mayor Sushma Kharakwal inaugurated the Lalji Tandon Multipurpose Hall

Lok Sabha
Preceded by Atal Bihari Vajpayee	Member of Parliament for Lucknow; 2009 – 2014	Succeeded by Rajnath Singh
Political offices
Preceded by Satya Pal Malik	Governor of Bihar; 23 August 2018 – 28 July 2019	Succeeded by Phagu Chauhan
Preceded by Anandiben Patel	Governor of Madhya Pradesh; 29 July 2019 - 30 June 2020	Succeeded by Anandiben Patel
