= Rangbaaz (TV series) =

Indian web series

- Poster Image
- Genre: Action; Crime; Biography
- Directed by: Bhav Dhulia
- Starring: Saqib Saleem; Aahana Kumra; Tigmanshu Dhulia; Ravi Kishan; Ranvir Shorey; Jimmy Sheirgill; Sushant Singh; Gul Panag; Mohammed Zeeshan Ayyub
- Composer: Roby Abraham
- Country of origin: India
- Original language: Hindi
- No. of seasons: 3
- No. of episodes: 24 (list of episodes)

Production
- Executive producers: Muhitt Agarwaal; Rakesh Bhagwani; Ajay Rai; Vinamrata Rai; Vinay G. Rai; Rahul Rawat; Vishwankar Pathania; Pankaj Batra; Ankur B. Saraiya
- Cinematography: Tojo Xavier
- Editor: Nandkishor
- Production company: JAR Pictures

Original release
- Network: ZEE5
- Release: 22 December 2018

Rangbaaz is an Indian web series set against the rustic background of the Gorakhpur in the 1990s. It was released as a ZEE5 original on 22 December 2018. In October 2019, ZEE5 renewed the show for a second season, Rangbaaz Phirse, which premiered on 20 December 2019. Season three, titled Rangbaaz: Darr Ki Rajneeti, premiered on ZEE5 on 29 July 2022.

== Synopsis ==
Season 1

Rangbaaz is based on the true story of Shri Prakash Shukla (Shiv Prakash Shukla in the series), who was a notorious gangster and the most wanted criminal of Gorakhpur, Uttar Pradesh. The series shows his journey from a DDU student to becoming the second most wanted criminal in India. Other characters related to Shree Prakash's life include Ram Shankar Tiwari, inspired by Hari Shankar Tiwari, and Chandra Bhan Singh, inspired by Suraj Bhan Singh (former MP from Mokama, Bihar).

Season 2

Rangbaaz Phir Se is inspired from the life of Anandpal Singh (name changed to Amarpal Singh) who was a gangster active in the state of Rajasthan. The series chronicles his rise to becoming the most wanted criminal in the history of Rajasthan. The story also covers his illicit business of liquor, his rivalry with Gopal Phogawat (name changed to Raja Phogat), and his dynamics with the political leadership of the state.

Season 3

Rangbaaz: Darr Ki Rajneeti Season 3 has premiered on 29 July 2022 on ZEE5 starring Vineet Kumar Singh and Aakanksha Singh. The story of the main character is supposedly based on a Gangster turned politician Mohammad Shahabuddin.

== Cast ==
=== Season 1 ===
- Saqib Saleem as Shiv Prakash Shukla (inspired by Shri Prakash Shukla).
- Tigmanshu Dhulia as Ram Shankar Tiwari (inspired by Hari Shankar Tiwari).
- Ranvir Shorey as Sidharth Pandey - Special Task Force Lead
- Aahana Kumra as Babita Sharma
- Jay Saumik Joshi as Abhishek
- Ravi Kishan as Chandra Bhan Singh (inspired by Surajbhan Singh)
- Arun Kalra as Narendra Shahi (inspired by Virendra Pratap Shahi)
- Chandan Anand as Ranjan Tiwari
- Pawan Chopra as Director General of Police - UP
- Bharat Chawla as Sushant
- Saurabh Goyal as Host of India's Most Wanted (inspired by Suhaib Ilyasi)
- Gaurav Mishra as Munna Shukla
- Ankur B. Saraiya as Bangkok Goon
- Daya Shankar Pandey as Mahavir
- Ajay Singh as Morena Vidhayak
- Atul Pandey as Tanuj Pratap Singh

=== Season 2 / Rangbaaz Phirse ===
- Jimmy Shergill as Amar Pal Singh (inspired by Anandpal Singh)
- Sharad Kelkar as Raja Phogat
- Mohammed Zeeshan Ayyub as Sanjay Singh Meena
- Mahima Makwana as Vaishali 'Chiku' Singh, Amar Pal's daughter
- Gul Panag as Anupriya (inspired by Anuradha Chaudhary)
- Sushant Singh as Jai Ram Godara (inspired by Jeevan Godara)
- Harsh Chhaya as Sundar Singh Chauhan
- Chetan Pandit as Home Minister Ahlawat
- Amit Sial as Balram Rathi (inspired by balvir banuda)
- Spruha Joshi as Rukmini, wife of Amar Pal
- Sonam Arora as Madhu Godavari, wife of Jai Ram
- Ujjwal Chopra as Harjiram

=== Season 3 / Rangbaaz Dar ki Raajneeti ===
Third season of the show premiered on ZEE5 platform on 29 July 2022. The season's story is loosely based on Gangster turned politician Mohammad Shahabuddin from Bihar.

- Vineet Kumar as Shah Ali Baig: Sana's husband
- Aakanksha Singh as Sana: Shah Ali Baig's wife
- Vijay Maurya
- Prashant Narayanan
- Rajesh Tailang
- Geetanjali Kulkarni
- Prateek Srivastava
- Teetu Verma as Dinesh Singh

== Episodes ==
Series	Episodes	Originally released
1	9	21 December 2018
2	9	20 December 2019

=== Season 1 ===
No. overall	No. in season	Title	Directed by	Written by	Original release date
1	1	"Gangster Ka Mobile Phone"	Bhav Dhulia	Siddharth Mishra	21 December 2018
2	2	"Coming-of-age"	Bhav Dhulia	Siddharth Mishra	22 December 2018
3	3	"Bhiksha, Shiksha and Diksha"	Bhav Dhulia	Siddharth Mishra	22 December 2018
4	4	"Naam Hai Ram Shankar Tiwari"	Bhav Dhulia	Siddharth Mishra	22 December 2018
5	5	"Shiv Prakash Kiske Saath Hai?"	Bhav Dhulia	Siddharth Mishra	22 December 2018
6	6	"Mata Ka Jagarta"	Bhav Dhulia	Siddharth Mishra	22 December 2018
7	7	"Apaharan"	Bhav Dhulia	Siddharth Mishra	22 December 2018
8	8	"National Level Ka Criminal"	Bhav Dhulia	Siddharth Mishra	22 December 2018
9	9	"Climax"	Bhav Dhulia	Siddharth Mishra	22 December 2018

=== Season 2 / Rangbaaz Phirse ===
No. overall	No. in season	Title	Directed by	Written by	Original release date
10	1	"Power Game"	Sachin Pathak	Siddharth Mishra	20 December 2019
11	2	"Sabki Samadhi Yahi Banegi"	Sachin Pathak	Siddharth Mishra	20 December 2019
12	3	"Dhande Ka Ganit"	Sachin Pathak	Siddharth Mishra	20 December 2019
13	4	"Over and Out"	Sachin Pathak	Siddharth Mishra	20 December 2019
14	5	"Savdhani Hati, Durghatna Ghati"	Sachin Pathak	Siddharth Mishra	20 December 2019
15	6	"Chakravyuh Hai, Phans Jaayega"	Sachin Pathak	Siddharth Mishra	20 December 2019
16	7	"Girgit Rang Birang"	Sachin Pathak	Siddharth Mishra	20 December 2019
17	8	"Do aur Do Paanch"	Sachin Pathak	Siddharth Mishra	20 December 2019
18	9	"Surrender"	Sachin Pathak	Siddharth Mishra	20 December 2019

== Sequel Spin-off ==
After the successful run of first season, ZEE5 announced a spin-off sequel for the show, titled "Rangbaaz Phirse"

== Reception ==
=== Rangbaaz ===
The New Indian Express rated with 3/5 stars and critically reviewed the series by saying it had nothing out of the ordinary about the crime and criminals story. The lead actor performed well in his role as a gangster in making. The series relied so much on the film songs of the era to create a particular mood for the storyline which was a bit tiresome.

=== Rangbaaz Phirse ===
Binged gave a rating of 6/10 stars to Rangbaaz Phirse and critically reviewed the actors performances. They also stated that the series fails to display a larger than life gangster profile. Moreover, the direction of the series makes it look quite authentic when capturing expressions and other important scenes. Throughout the nine episodes the rise and fall of its protagonist is portrayed dramatically in impressive detail.

Hindustan Times gave a review about the series saying that the series focuses on the rural heartlands plagued by the caste hierarchy. The storyline revolves around gruesome tit-for-tat that leads to numerous murders involving bystanders, politicians and cops, serving their own agendas. The cast were praised..
