= List of educational institutions in Varanasi =

The following is a list of educational institutions in Varanasi. Varanasi (known earlier as Benares) is a city situated on the banks of the River Ganges in the Indian state of Uttar Pradesh and is approximately 800 kilometers(497 miles) southeast of national capital Delhi. Varanasi is home to an Institute of Eminence, Banaras Hindu University as well as an Institute of National Importance, IIT(BHU) Varanasi. Varanasi has Educational Institutions for Every field of Interest, Universities Like BHU, Mahatma Gandhi Kashi Vidyapith etc., Colleges Like Udai Pratap Autonomous College, and leading Schools like Sunbeam Academy, Central Hindu School etc.

== Universities ==
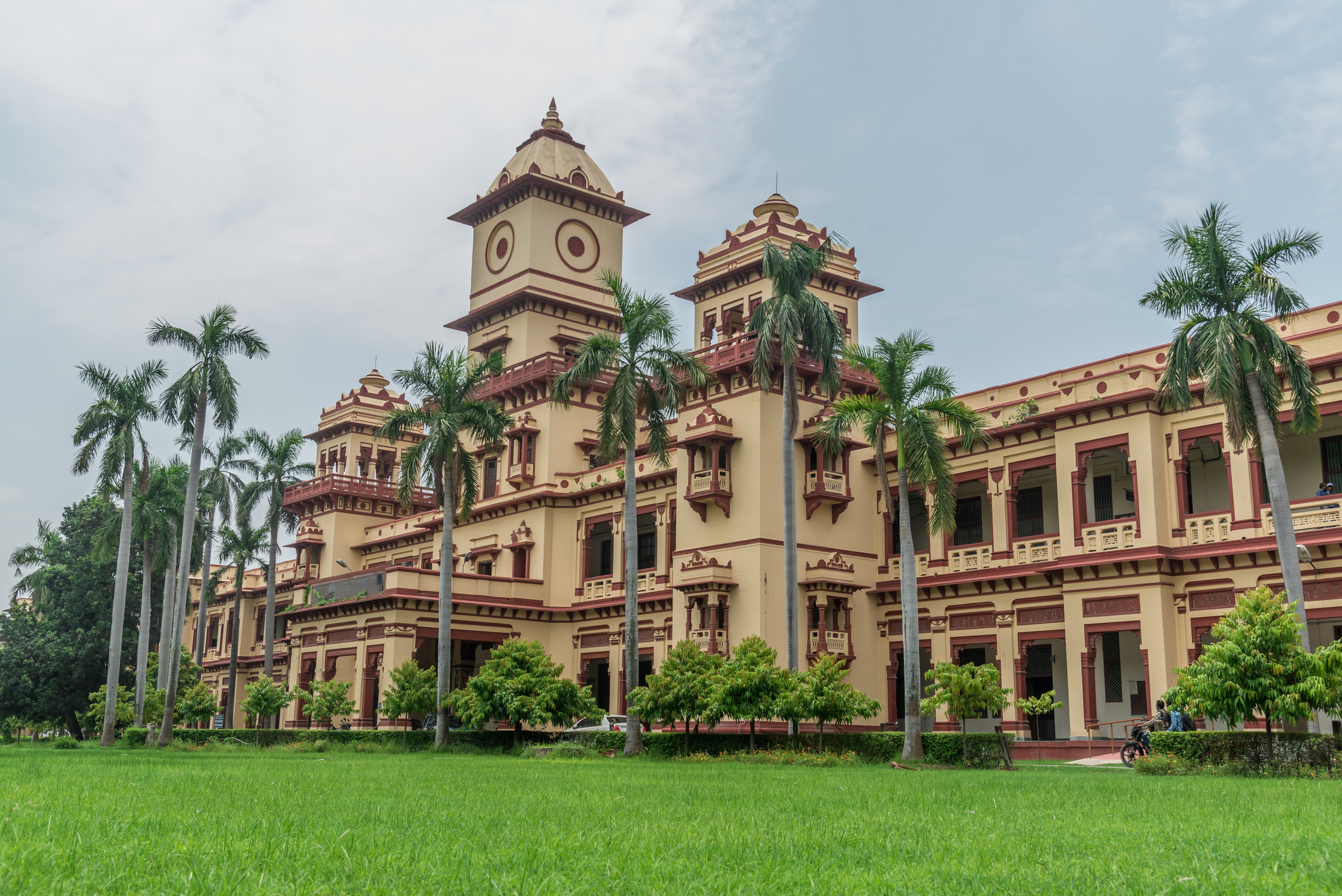
Dept of Electrical Engineering, IIT-BHU

- Banaras Hindu University (Institutes of Eminence)
- Central Institute of Higher Tibetan Studies (Deemed University)
- Indian Institute of Technology, Varanasi (Institutes of National Importance)
- Mahatma Gandhi Kashi Vidyapith
- Sampurnanand Sanskrit University
- National Institute of Fashion Technology, Varanasi
- National School of Drama, Varanasi
- National Forensic Science University, Varanasi

== Colleges/Institutes ==
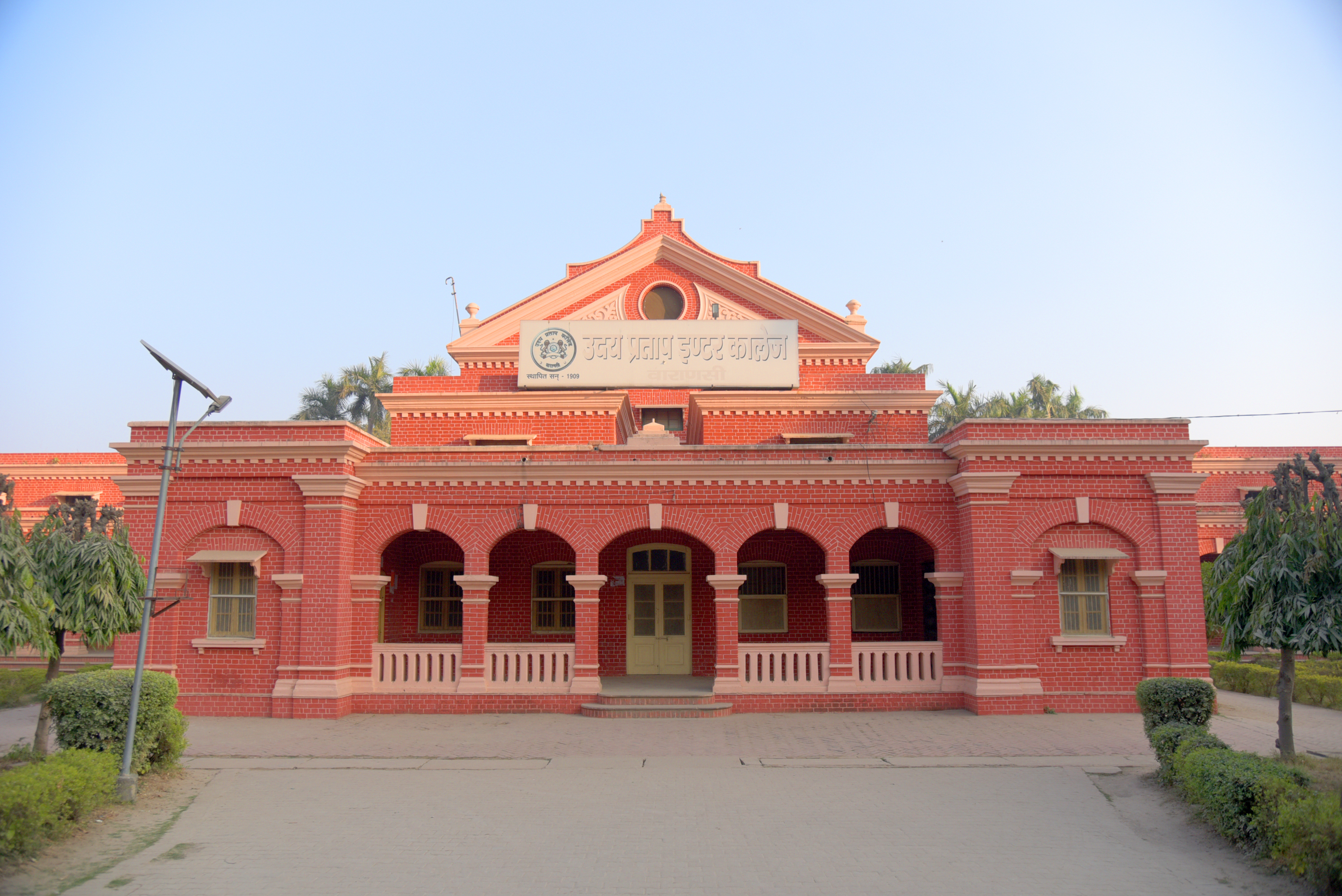
Uday Pratap Autonomous College

- Arya Mahila Mahavidyalaya
- DAV Post Graduate College
- Institute of Science, Banaras Hindu University
- Faculty of Arts, Banaras Hindu University
- Faculty of Commerce, Banaras Hindu University
- Faculty of Sanskrit Vidya Dharma Vigyan
- Faculty of Social Sciences, Banaras Hindu University
- Harish Chandra Postgraduate College
- Indian Institute of Handloom Technology
- Indian Institute of Vegetable Research
- Institute of Pharmacy
- International Rice Research Institute
- Kashi Institute of Pharmacy
- KJ College of Pharmacy
- Mission College of Pharmacy
- National Seed Research and Training Centre
- National School of Drama
- Rajarshi School Of Management and Technology
- Saraswati Higher Education & Technical College of Pharmacy
- School of Management Sciences
- Sri Agrasen Kanya P.G. College
- Subhash Chandra Mahavidyalaya
- Sunbeam College for Women
- Udai Pratap Autonomous College
- Varanasi College Of Pharmacy
- Vasant Kanya Mahavidyalaya

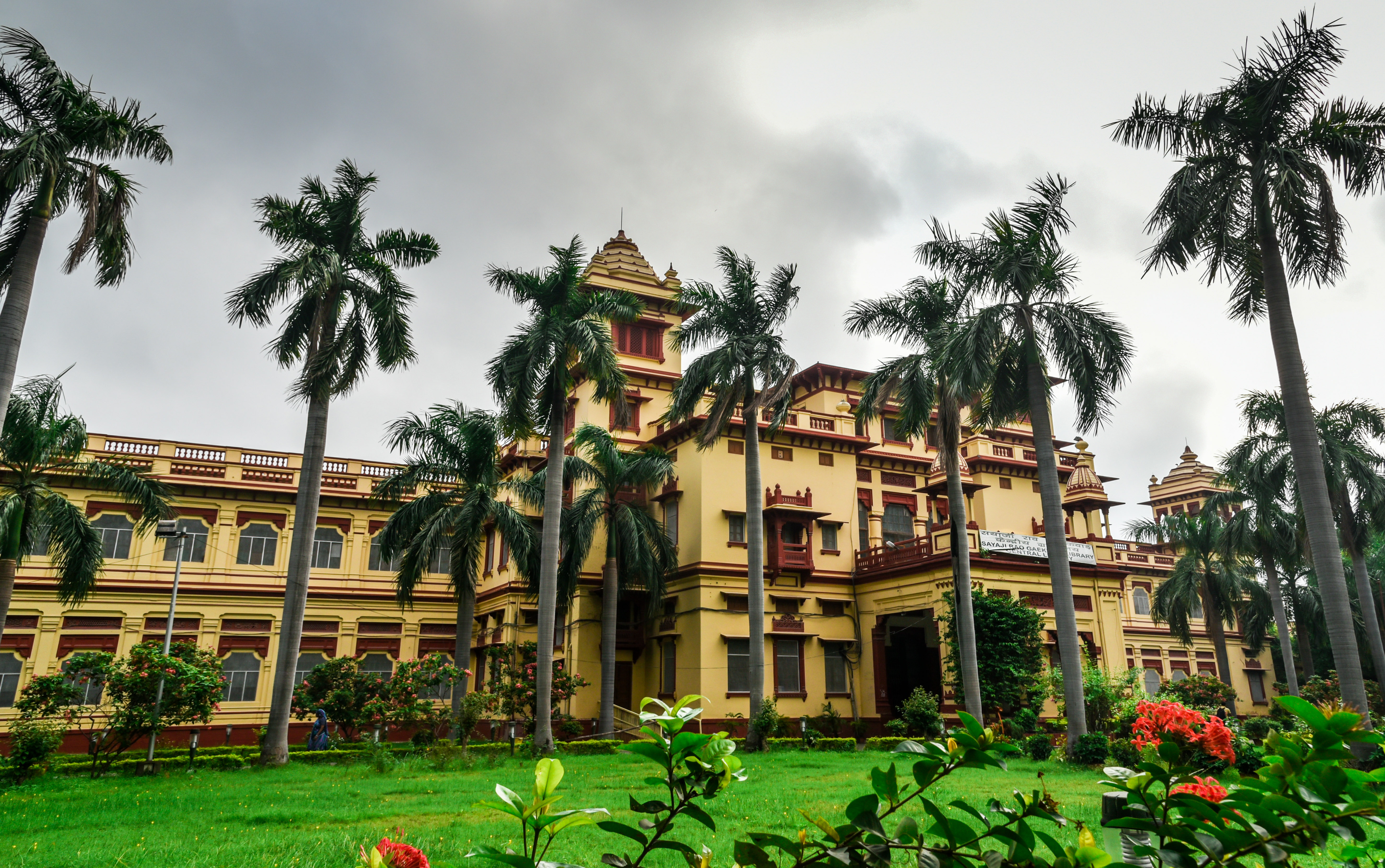
Central Library, BHU

=== Engineering Colleges ===
- Indian Institute of Technology, Varanasi
- Ambition Institute of Technology
- Ashoka Institute of Technology and Management
- Banaras Institute of Polytechnic and Engineering
- Jeevandeep Institute of Management & Technology
- Kashi Institute of Technology
- Microtek College of Technology and Management
- Rajarshi School of Management and Technology (RSMT)
- Saraswati Higher Education & Technical College of Engineering
- SHEAT College of Engineering
- Shree Bhagwat Institute of Technology
  Institute Of Medical Sciences, BHU

=== Medical Colleges ===
- Institute of Medical Sciences, Banaras Hindu University
- Faculty of Ayurveda, Banaras Hindu University
- Shri Krishna Ayurvedic Medical College and Hospital
- Ayurvedic College and Hospital
- Heritage Institute of Medical Sciences

== UP board school ==
- Dr.Radhakrishnan higher secondary school, Puari Kala
- Sanatan Dharam Inter College, Nai Sadak
- Prabhu Narayan Government Inter College
- Kalidas Shikshan Sansthan, Ramnagar
- Radha Kishori Inter College, Ramnagar

== CBSE Schools ==
- Dr. Radhakrishnan Jigher Secondary School, Puari Kala
- S S Public School, Babatpur
- Jaipuria School, Babatpur
- Army Public School
- Aryan International School
- Central Hindu Boys School
- Central Hindu Girls School
- DALIMSS Sunbeam School, Mahmoorganj
- DALIMSS Sunbeam School, Paharia
- DALIMSS Sunbeam School, Ramkatora
- DALIMSS Sunbeam School, Rohania
- DALIMSS Sunbeam School, Sigra
- Delhi Public School (Kashi), Airport Road
- Delhi Public School (Varanasi), Mohansarai
- GD Goenka Public School
- Guru Nanak English School
- Jawahar Navodaya Vidyalaya
- Jaipura School, Babatpur
- Kendriya Vidyalaya, BHU
- Kendriya Vidyalaya, Cantt
- Kendriya Vidyalaya, DLW
- Kendriya Vidyalaya, DLW (Campus 2)
- Little Flower House, Ashapur
- Little Flower House, Kakarmatta
- Divine Sainik School, Lahartara
- Glenhill School, Manduadih
- Mount Litera Zee School
- Raj English School
- Rajghat Besant School
- Sant Atulanand Residential Academy
- Sant Atulanand Convent School
- St. Mary's Convent School, Sonatalab
- St. Thomas International School
- Seth Anandram Jaipuria School
- Seth MR Jaipuria Schools, Babatpur
- Seth MR Jaipuria Schools, Padao
- SOS Hermann Gmeiner School
- Sunbeam Academy, Durgakund
- Sunbeam Academy, Knowledge Park
- Sunbeam Academy, Samneghat
- Sunbeam Academy, Sarainandan
- Sunbeam School, Annapurna
- Sunbeam School, Babatpur
- Sunbeam School, Bhagwanpur
- Sunbeam School, Indiranagar
- Sunbeam School, Lahartara
- Sunbeam School, Sarnath
- Sunbeam School, Suncity
- Sunbeam School, Varuna
- Sunbeam School, Mughalsarai
- Swami Harsewanand Public School, Banpurwa
- Swami Harsewanand Public School, Garhwaghat
- Swami Harsewanand Public School, Jagatganj
- T.V.N Varanasi

== ICSE Schools ==
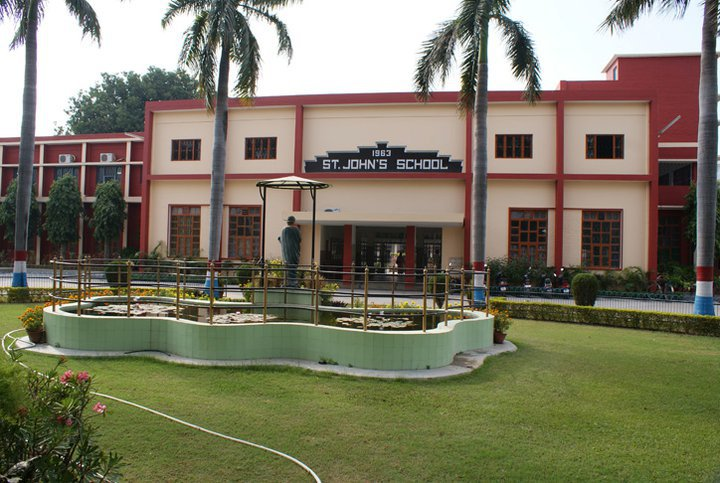
St John's School, DLW

- Bal Bharati Public School
- George Frank Christian English School
- St. Francis School
- St Joseph's Convent School
- St. John's School, DLW
- St. John's School, Marhauli
- St. John's School, Ledhupur
- St. Mary's Convent School, Cantt
- W.H. Smith Memorial School
