= Sri Prakash Shukla =

Indian gangster, 1973-1998

- Born: Shiv Prakash Shukla; October 6, 1973; Mamkhor, Gorakhpur; Uttar Pradesh
- Died: September 22, 1998 (aged 24); Ghaziabad, Uttar Pradesh
- Cause of death: Encounter killing
- Other names: Shri Prakash Shukla (In Police Records); Ashok Singh (In Police Records)
- Occupation: Gangster
- Years active: 5
- Parent: Late Ram Samujh Shukla (father)
- Wanted by: Special Task Force (India)

Details
- Span of crimes: 1993–1998
- Weapons: Ak-47; .45mm Pistol; 9mm Pistol; Carbine

Sri Prakash Shukla (6 October 1973 – 22 September 1998) was an notorious Indian gangster and criminal active during the 1990s mainly in the state of Uttar Pradesh. He used to be hired mainly by mobsters, politicians and strongmen, to kill their opponents. He was killed on 22 September 1998, in an encounter with the UP police's Special Task Force, which was formed primarily to eliminate him. He was just 24 at the time of his death.

== Life ==
Shukla was born in Mamkhor village, Gorakhpur, India on Dussehra (October 6, 1973) in a Hindu Brahmin family. His father, Ram Samujh Shukla was a retired Indian Air Force officer, later a government contractor. Shukla was the youngest amongst 5 siblings. He is reported to have been a notable wrestler in his village, following the footsteps of his father & grandfather who were both known to have been of prominent physical stature.

In 1993, 19 year old Shukla shot a man dead due to a local gang rivalry, which marked his first reported criminal offense. Following the murder, Shukla escaped to Bangkok with the help of his close aide gangster Hari Shankar Tiwari, who is widely recognised as Northern India’s first prominent mafia-politician or “Bahubali” and is credited with introducing the systematic blend of organised crime and politics in Uttar Pradesh.

Shukla returned and became associated with former MP Surajbhan Singh of Mokama, Bihar. Shukla has two names in Indian police records - Shri Prakash Shukla, and Ashok Singh.

In March 1997, Shukla shot and killed Virendra Shahi, a prominent mafia don & former MLA regarded as one of the most powerful figures in Purvanchal’s crime–politics nexus at the time, in Indira Nagar of Lucknow. Shukla used an AK-47 assault rifle, firing over 120 rounds at Shahi. This use of automatic military-grade weapons in gang rivalry was largely unheard of in UP, and much of India at the time. It was presumed that Hari Shankar Tiwari being an opponent of Virendra Shahi, would be targeted next for the Chillupar assembly seat.

On 26 May 1998, Shukla's gang kidnapped Kunal Rastogi, son of a businessman, from Botanical Gardens in Lucknow. His father was shot dead as he tried to save him. The gang allegedly took ₹5 Crore from a relative in Kanpur to free the son.

In 1998, Shukla was tasked with eliminating Brij Behari Prasad, a rival minister in Lalu Yadav’s government. Shukla admitted himself as a patient to Patna’s Indira Gandhi Institute of Medical Sciences (IGIMS), blending in with hospital staff and patients. On July 10, 1998, he murdered Prasad. During his stay, Shukla noticed a female assistant, a local MP Pappu Yadav’s sister. He gathered personal information and began threatening her politically connected family despite warnings from his associate. Shukla arrogantly continued and called Pappu Yadav’s residence to intimidate him.

Soon after, ADG Ajay Raj Sharma was summoned urgently by the then Chief Minister Kalyan Singh, who revealed that a contract worth crores had been taken to kill him. Sakshi Maharaj, a Member of the Parliament from Farrukhabad claimed that Shukla had taken a contract worth ₹8 Crore (~$887k) to assassinate CM Singh.

Shri Prakash Shukla was considered as one of the country’s most wanted criminals by the late 1990s, being declared a threat to national security after reports of the contract to assassinate the then Chief Minister emerged. Shukla’s ability to bypass security and strike at high-profile targets demanded immediate action, to which ADG Sharma proposed forming a special unit which CM Singh approved instantly. This gave birth to the STF in 1998. The STF was primarily formed by the Uttar Pradesh police to capture or kill Shukla, along with 43 other top criminals of the state. ADG Sharma handpicked the best officers, including CO Rajesh Pandey and SSP Arun Kumar tasked with tracking and eliminating Shukla.

== Death ==
On 8 and 15 September 1998, episodes about Shri Prakash Shukla were broadcast on the crime show India's Most Wanted. The host of the show, Suhaib Ilyasi, claimed to have received threat calls from Shukla after that. He has also said that he got an anonymous phone call on 10 September 1998 saying Shukla and his associates had been seen in a blue Daewoo Cielo near AIIMS Delhi. On 21 September, another anonymous caller said that Shukla and his associates had been seen in Ghaziabad in a blue Daewoo Cielo. The tips were forwarded to the Delhi and Uttar Pradesh police.

On 22 September 1998, Shukla was shot dead by the Uttar Pradesh police's Special Task Force (STF), outside an apartment complex in Ghaziabad. Shukla was hiding in the Vasant Kunj area of Delhi. He had come to Ghaziabad to visit his girlfriend. He was on his way to the Palam airport presumably to escape to Ranchi, where his arms-dealer Suraj Bhan lived. By this time, the task force, which was formed in April, had spent ₹1 million in the investigation and had flown between Patna, Lucknow and Delhi trying to track him down. He was tracked down primarily by his mobile phone. He used to change SIM cards but he had used one number more than other for a week. The mobile phone and diary recovered after the shootout provided evidence of his connections to politicians.

== After death ==
After his death, the STF found that Shukla was connected to various politicians. His godfather and protector was Amarmani Tripathi, members of the Mayawati government and various politicians had provided him shelter. Some had taken money from Shukla in exchange for these favours. On 5 November 1998, Pritam Singh, a member of the STF, was shot dead by members of Shukla's gang.

== In popular culture ==
- In 2005, a film, Sehar, based on the STF's work which killed Shukla was released. The character based on Shukla was played by Sushant Singh.
- In 2010, a Game series, Gunahon Ka Devta, was broadcast. One of the characters was based on Shukla.
- Zee5's Rangbaaz first session is based on Shukla's character played by Saqib Saleem.
- JioCinema's Inspector Avinash is based on the STF which killed Shukla.
