= List of educational institutions in Gorakhpur =

Educational institutions in Gorakhpur, Uttar Pradesh, India

This is a list of educational institutions in Gorakhpur, Uttar Pradesh, India

== Schools ==
- G. N. National Public School, Gorakhnath, Gorakhpur
- Zenith Convent Senior Secondary School, Nandanagar, Gorakhpur
- Air Force School, Gorakhpur
- St. Joseph's School, Gorakhnath, Gorakhpur
- St. Joseph's School, Khorabar, Gorakhpur
- Springer Public School, Industrial Area, Bargadwa, Gorakhpur
- Central Academy Senior Secondary School, Gorakhpur
- Central Hindu School, Jharkhandi
- Hallmark World School, Medical College road, Gorakhpur
- Mahatma Gandhi Inter College, Bank Road, Gorakhpur
- Jawahar Navodaya Vidyalaya, Jungle Agahi Pipiganj
- Jublee Inter College, Bakshipur, Gorakhpur
- D. B. Inter College
- Army public school, Gorakhpur
- Delhi public school, Maniram, Gorakhpur
- GD Goyanka public school, Gorakhpur
- Sainik School (upcoming), Gorakhpur
- Little Flower School, Gita Vatika
- Little Flower School, Chargawan
- Balaji Academy, Gorakhpur

== Colleges ==
- Baba Raghav Das Medical College
- GOVERNMENT PHARMACY COLLEGE
- Veer Bahadur Singh Sports College, Gorakhpur
- Saheed Raja Hari Prasad Mall Rajkiya Homoeopathic Medical College & Hospital, Barhalganj, Gorakhpur
- State Institute of Hotel Management (Upcoming)
- Mahamaya Polytechnic of Information Technology, Hariharpur, Gorakhpur. [12]

== List of Institutes affiliated with Dr. A.P.J. Abdul Kalam Technical University, Lucknow, Uttar Pradesh running in Gorakhpur city ==
S.No	Institute Code	Name of College
1	120	Institute of Technology & Management
2	408	Chandra Mauli Institute of Management Sciences & Technology
3	490	Suyash Institute of Information Technology
4	516	Kailash Institute of Pharmacy & Management
5	517	KIPM College of Management
6	525	Buddha Institute of Technology
7	571	Dr. B.R. Ambedkar Pooja College of Pharmacy
8	751	KIPM College of Engineering & Technology
9	766	Purvanchal Institute of Architecture & Design
10	882	Tahira Institute of Medical Sciences
11	907	SUYASH INSTITUTE OF PHARMACY
12	932	BUDDHA INSTITUTE OF PHARMACY
13	1071	SARDAR PATEL COLLEGE OF PHARMACY

== Universities ==
- All India Institute of Medical Sciences, Gorakhpur
- Deen Dayal Upadhyay Gorakhpur University
- Madan Mohan Malaviya University of Technology
- Mahayogi Gorakhnath University
- Maha Yogi Guru Gorakhnath Ayush University
- Uttar Pradesh Forestry & Horticulture University (Upcoming in 2028)
- National Institute of Electronics & Information Technology, (NIELIT Gorakhpur) (Deemed university)

== Other Institutes ==
- The Brokencap
- Veterinary Science Medical College, Gorakhpur(upcoming)
