= Government Inter College =

Government Inter College may refer to:

- Aditya Nath Jha Government Inter College, Rudrapur
- GIC Deoria
- Government Inter College Barabanki
- Government Inter College Faizabad
- Government Inter College Noida
- Prabhu Narayan Government Inter College

== See also ==
- Government Girls Inter College, Dildar Nagar
