= List of educational institutions in Pratapgarh district, Uttar Pradesh =

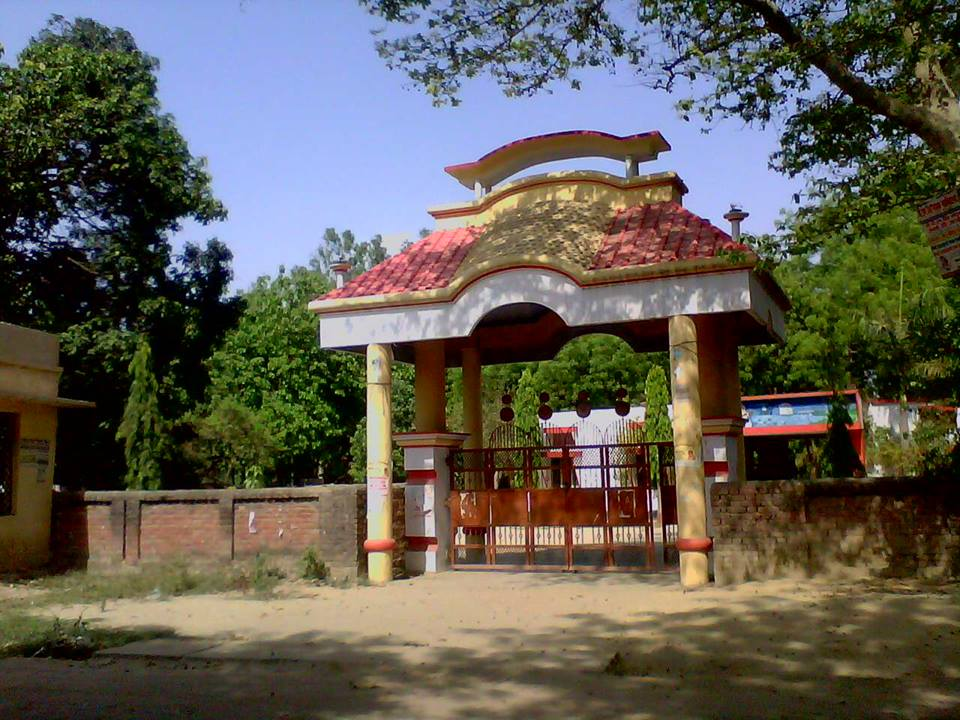
Amar Janta Intermediate College, in Katra Gulab Singh

- Baba Jageshwar Intermediate College, Sandwa Khas, Saraianadeo, Pratapgarh
- RYS Public Intermediate College, Khandwa, Pratapgarh
- Govt Polytechnic, Sultanpur Road, Chilbila
- Hemwait Nandan Bahuguna Post Graduate Degree College, Lalganj
- Krishi Vigyan Kendra, Avadheshpuram, Lala Bazar, Kalakankar
- MDPG College
- P B College
- Shiv Pati Devi Yamuna Prasad Mishra Balika Inter College, Ajhara, Lalganj, Pratapgarh (Prastavit)
- Government Girls Inter College (G.G.I.C.), Pratapgarh, U.P.
- Jawahar Navodaya Vidyalaya, Narayanpur, Pratapgarh. U.P.
- Sangam International School, Katra Medniganj, Pratapgarh, Uttar Pradesh
- Novel International School, Rakhaha Pratapgarh
- Sarla Inter College Chamrupur, Pratapgarh
- Dev Narayan Inter College, Kachha, Pratapgarh
- ATL school(C.B.S.E Board) Katra Road Pratapgarh
- Angels Inter College, Shivjipuram, Katara Road, Pratapgarh
- Sanskar Global School
- S.K. Memorial Foundation Of India, Pratapgarh (U.P)
- St Johns Academy, Viveknagar, Pratapgarh
- Saraswati Sishu Mandir, Ajeet Nagar, Pratapgarh (U.P.)
- B. D Mishra Intermediate College, Tarapur, Pratapgarh
- M. P. S Intermediate College, Jethwara, Pratapgarh
- Mahatma Gandhi Inter College, Bahunchara-230137, Pratapgarh
- Krishna Prasad Hindu Intermediate College Pratapgarh
- G. V. Inter College Delhupur pratapgarh
- S.B.P. Inter College Bahuta, Patti, Pratapgarh.
- Shivram intermediate college Kushaha Pratapgarh (u.p.)
- Ram Narayan Intermediate College, Patti, Pratapgarh.
- Prabavati memorial public school(CBSE Board) Kushaha Pratapgarh (U.P.)
- R. S. B. Inter College Baghrai, Pratapgarh 230129 (Up)
- Ma Gomati Smarak Degree College Bhav Baghrai Pratapgarh 230201 (UP)
- Gyanodaya Vidyalaya Baghrai Pratapgarh 230129 (UP)
- Mahadev Prashad intermediate college(M.P.I.C), mahadev nagar, Pratapgarh
- Sangipur PG Mahavidyalaya, Sangipur, Pratapgarh
- Government Girl Inter College(G.G.I.C.) Sangipur, Pratapgarh
- Government Inter College, Sangipur.Pratapgarh
- St. Anthony's Inter College, Civil Lines, Pratapgarh
- SP Inter College Kunda Luknow-Allahabad National Highway, Pratapgarh
- Balbhadra Inter College Deeha Shekpur-Hathigawan GT Road, Pratapgarh
- Tulsi Inter College Babuganj Jamethi, Kunda Pratapgarh
- Hathigawa Inter College, Hathigawa Road, Kunda Pratapgarh
- St. Fransis Convent School, Pratapgarh
- Ram Anjor Mishra Inter college, lalganj, pratapgarh
- Lords Children School, Cristion Colony, Pratapgarh
- Prabhat Academy (I.C.S.E.Board), Pratapgarh
- Govt Polytechnic, Sultanpur Road, Chilbila
- Angels Inter College, Katra Road, Pratapgarh
- Saraswati Vidya Mandir Lalganj Ajhara
- P.G College Patti Pratapgarh.
- Ram Raj Intermediate College Patti Pratapgarh UP
- B.D. Intermediate College Pure Budhidhar Baba Gang Kunda Pratap Garh
- M.D.P.G. College Allahabad Road Pratap Garh
- P.B.P.G. and Inter College Pratapgarh City
- G.I.C. (Government Inter College) Pratap Garh
- Madarsa Islameya Noorululoom Harharpur Balkerangang Vishwanathgang Pratapgarh.
- Madarsa Islameya Darululoom Basupur Mandhata Pratapgarh
- Krishi Vigyan Kendra, Avadheshpuram, Lala Bazar, Kalakankar
- Kalu Ram Inter College, Shitalaganj, Pratapgarh.
- Rani Rajeshwari Inter College, Dilippur, Pratapgarh
- Hemwati Nandan Bahuguna Post Graduate Degree College, Lalganj
- Amar Janta Inter Mediate College, Katra Gulab Singh
- Abul kalam Inter College
- Bharat Singh Inter College Kumhiya Patti Pratapgarh.
- Tilak Inter College
- Shankar Vidyalaya Inter College, Kataiya, Pratapgarh
- Bhadreshwar Inter college Derwa Kunda Pratapgarh.
- P. P S Intermediate College Daudpur Saraimadhai Pratapgarh
- B.B.S.Inter College Barna Lalgopalganj Kunda Pratapgarh
- S.J.P.R.N.D.Inter College, Ramapur, Kohandour, Pratapgarh
- Brijendra Mani Inter College(BMIC), Kohandour, Pratapgarh
- Shweta memorial girls inter college, ashthbhujanagar pratapgarh
- L.B.S Sikhsan & prasikshan sansthan entha, kunda, pratapgarh
- Krishna Gurukulam Public School Kripalu dham Mangarh Pratapgarh
- Lallan Shambhu Inter Mediate College, Harakhpur, Mandhata, pratapgarh.
- Joyti Higher Secondary School, Kisun Ganj, Sandwa Chandikan, Pratapgarh.
- D.R. Primary School Katra Medniganj Pratapgarh.
- G.B.K.S Saryu Inter College
- Chatradhari Inter College, lakhpeda, kunda, pratapgarh.
- Aatreya Academy (PKG to 5th), Sabzi Mandi Road, Pratapgarh
- Aatreya Academy (6th to 12th), Phulwari, Pratapgarh
- Kidzee Pre School, 91, Gayatri Nagar, Balipur, Pratapgarh, UP
- Manoratham School, 351, Karanpur, Meera Bhawan Chowraha, Pratapgarh, U.P.
