= Aman Mani Tripathi =

Indian politician (born 1982)

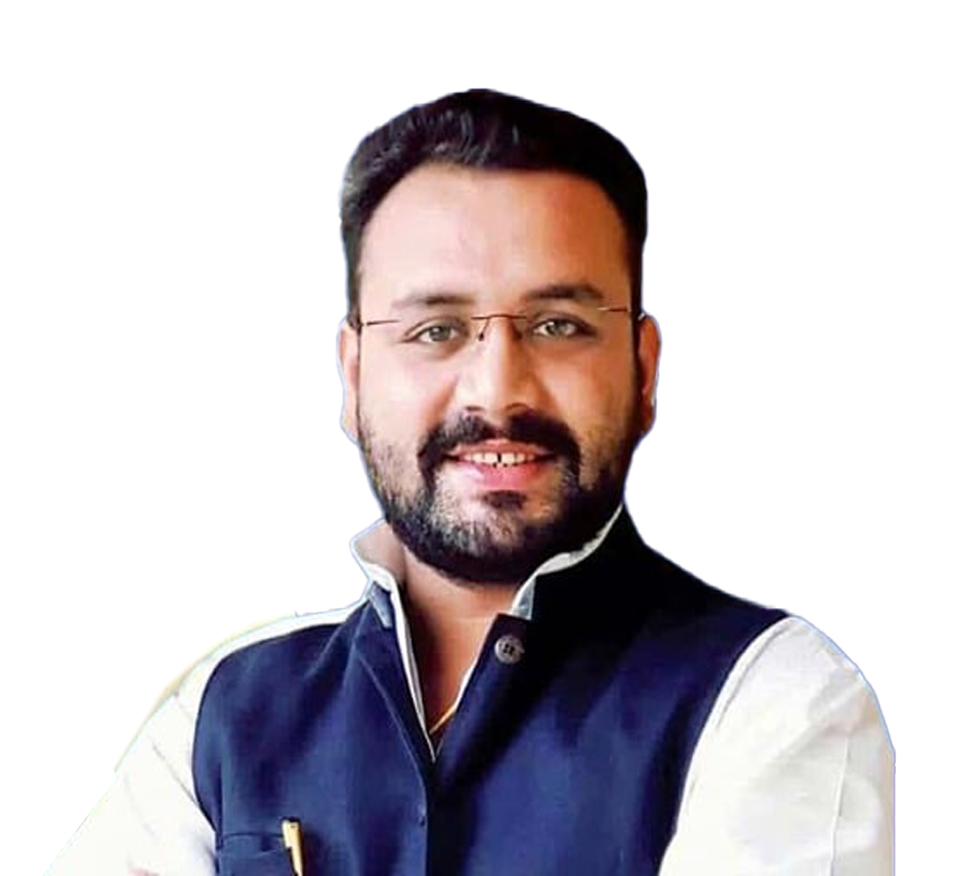

MLA in 17th Legislative Assembly of Uttar Pradesh
- In office March 2017 – March 2022
- Preceded by: Kunwar Kaushal Kishore Singh
- Succeeded by: Rishi Tripathi
- Constituency: Nautanwa (Assembly constituency)

Personal details
- Born: 12 January 1982 (age 44) Gorakhpur, Uttar Pradesh
- Party: Independent
- Parent: Amarmani Tripathi (father)
- Education: Gorakhpur University (graduation)
- Occupation: MLA
- Profession: Politician; Farmer

Aman Mani Tripathi (born 12 January 1982) is an Indian politician and a member of 17th Legislative Assembly of Uttar Pradesh from Maharajganj. He represents the Nautanwa (Assembly constituency) in Maharajganj district of Uttar Pradesh as an Independent politician.

== Early life and education ==
Tripathi was born 12 January 1982 in Gorakhpur city of Uttar Pradesh to Amarmani Tripathi and Madhu Mani Tripathi. He completed his schooling from Springer Public School, Gorakhpur. In 2012, he graduated from Deen Dayal Upadhyay Gorakhpur University.

== Political career ==
Tripathi's father, Amarmani Tripathi, was a four-time MLA from Lakshmipur (Assembly constituency) and also a cabinet minister in Government of Uttar Pradesh. He first ran for office in the 16th Legislative Assembly of Uttar Pradesh (2012) elections. He contested from Nautanwa Assembly as a member of Samajwadi Party but lost to Indian National Congress candidate Kunwar Kaushal Kishore Singh by a margin of 7,837 (4.15%) votes.

In 17th Legislative Assembly of Uttar Pradesh (2017) elections, Tripathi was denied a ticket by the Samajwadi Party after his name cropped up in his wife's murder case. After this he contested as Independent politician and was elected MLA by defeating Samajwadi Party candidate Kunwar Kaushal Kishore Singh by a margin of 32,256 (15.26%) votes.

Tripathi openly supports Yogi Adityanath for Chief Minister of Uttar Pradesh.

== Controversy ==
Tripathi was arrested and sent to jail on 25 November 2016 for his wife's murder. Tripathi was denied a ticket by the Samajwadi Party after his name cropped up in his wife's murder case. He was granted bail in March 2017 after winning the Assembly election as an independent candidate. He was chargesheeted on 18 February.

== Posts held ==
#	From	To	Position	Comments
01	March 2017	March 2022	Member, 17th Legislative Assembly of Uttar Pradesh	
