= Yeh Zindagi Hai Gulshan =

- Intertitle of "Yeh Zindagi Hai Gulshan".
- Genre: Television drama
- Written by: Suhabi Ilyasi & Tabrez Khan
- Directed by: Mushtaq Bala
- Creative director: Mushtaq Bala
- Starring: Damini Joshi Himanshu Soni Pankaj Dheer Zarina Wahab Nilu Kohli Anang Desai
- Theme music composer: Prakash G. Nar
- Opening theme: "Yeh Zindagi Hai Gulshan" by Paramita Bhattacharjee
- Country of origin: India
- Original language: Hindi
- No. of seasons: 1(143 episodes)

Production
- Producers: Suhaib Ilyasi & Mushtaq Bala
- Cinematography: Sushil Sharma & Govind Kumar
- Editors: Sunil Yadav & Honey Sethi
- Camera setup: Multi-camera
- Running time: Approx. 24 minutes
- Production company: Firstrate Debonair Creations

Original release
- Network: DD National
- Release: 26 February 2012 – 30 June 2013

Yeh Zindagi Hai Gulshan is an Indian television drama series, which premiered on DD National on 26 February 2012. The series focuses on the concept of empowerment of women in Muslim society. The series originally aired every week on Sunday but was converted to a twice-weekly series on Saturdays and Sundays due to its popularity. The series is produced jointly by Suhaib Ilyasi, director and the host of India's Most Wanted. and Mushtaq Bala, a film maker from Jammu and Kashmir

== Cast ==
- Naziya Khan
- Damini Joshi
- Himanshu Soni
- Raza Murad
- Pankaj Dheer
- Anang Desai
- Zarina Wahab
- Roma Bali
- Jyoti Gauba
- Neelu Kohli
- Akanksha Gilani
- Shilpa Raizada
- Resham Thakkar
- Falaq Naaz
- Jatin Bhatia
- Sayyad Zafar Ali
- Prithvi Zutshi
- Pushpa Verma
- Rajiv
- Upasana Singh
- Deep Ankur Batra
- Harsh Prajapati
- Arif Iliyasi
- Fatima Shaheen Sheikh
- Dolly Tomar
- Khan Wazida Tarannum
- Kavyanshi Simariya
