= Arya Mahila Mahavidyalaya =

College in Uttar Pradesh, India

- Logo of the college
- Type: Public women's college
- Established: 1 May 1956; 70 years ago
- Parent institution: Banaras Hindu University
- Principal: Rachna Dubey
- Students: 1,079
- Location: Varanasi, Uttar Pradesh; 25.317645°N 82.973914°E
- Campus: Urban
- Website: ampgc.ac.in
- College location on Varanasi district map

Arya Mahila Mahavidyalaya (Hindi: आर्य महिला महाविद्यालय) also known as Arya Mahila Degree College and as Arya Mahila PG College is a women's college in Varanasi, Uttar Pradesh, India admitted to the privileges of Banaras Hindu University. It was established in 1956 by Shri Arya Mahila Hitakarini Mahaparishad.

== History ==
Arya Mahila Mahavidyalaya was established in 1956 by Shri Arya Mahila Hitakarini Mahaparishad. The college is affiliated to Banaras Hindu University.

== Courses ==
The college offers courses at undergraduate and postgraduate levels in Arts, Social Sciences, Commerce, and Education.

== See also ==
- Banaras Hindu University
- DAV Post Graduate College Varanasi
- List of educational institutions in Varanasi
