= India's Most Wanted =

India's Most Wanted may refer to:

- India's Most Wanted (TV series)
- India's Most Wanted (film)
