= Ravana Rajputs =

Indian caste

Ravana Rajput is an Indian caste. They are among the castes known as Darogas.

== Origins ==
The Ravana Rajputs are descendants of Rajput and were not originally accepted by the Rajput community as Rajputs because their lands were gone. They were regarded as the children of the Rajputana princes' from concubines and were not household slaves. They served the royal Rajputana families as guards, soldiers and household servants.

In order to raise their status, these people organized themselves into a caste.

== Present status ==
Historically, the Ravana Rajputs have faced caste-based discrimination. The upper-caste Rajputs regard them as inferior, especially for matrimony. Nevertheless, the Ravana Rajputs place themselves highest in the rural caste hierarchy.

According to a 2013 Business Standard report, the Ravana Rajputs form around 7% of the Rajasthan state's population. They have been granted the Other Backward Class status for affirmative action.

In July 2017, the Ravana Rajput community were among those who protested against the alleged fake encounter killing of Anandpal Singh, who belonged to their community and was considered a hero by many in his village. Aside from being a gangster, Singh was known for having escalated the rivalry between Rajputs and Jat people. and the agitation following his death united the local Rajput community.
