= Sri Agrasen Kanya P.G. College =

Women's college in Uttar Pradesh, India

Shri Agrasen Kanya P.G. College
- Type: College
- Established: 1 July 1973
- Principal: Dr. Mithilesh Singh
- Location: Bulanala, Varanasi, Uttar Pradesh, India; 25.369861°N 82.959580°E
- Website: www.shriakpgc.net
- Location in Uttar Pradesh Location in India

Shri Agrasen Kanya P.G. College also known as Shri Agarsen Kanya Mahavidyalaya and as Shri Agrasen Kanya Post Graduate College is an autonomous women's college in Varanasi, Uttar Pradesh, India. Shri Agrasen Kanya P.G. College is affiliated to Mahatma Gandhi Kashi Vidyapith.

== History ==
Shri Agrasen Kanya P.G. College was founded in 1973. The college is run by Shri Agrawal Samaj and situated in Bulanala, Varanasi. The college is affiliated to Mahatma Gandhi Kashi Vidyapith and got autonomy in the academic session 2001–02. The college is the first women's college in the state of Uttar Pradesh to attain "autonomous college" status. The college was accredited grade A by NAAC in 2005.

== Courses ==
The college offers;

- Undergraduate degrees (B.A, B.Com and B.Sc).
- Post graduate degree (M.A).

== See also ==
- Mahatma Gandhi Kashi Vidyapith
- List of educational institutions in Varanasi
