= Anand Pal Singh =

Indian convicted gangster (2005-2017)

- Anandpal Singh at center
- Born: 31 May 1975; Sanvrad, Nagaur, Rajasthan
- Died: 24 June 2017 (aged 42)
- Cause of death: Shot during a police encounter
- Education: Bachelor of Arts
- Spouse: Raj Kanwar [1992–2017(till his death)]
- Children: 2
- Criminal charges: Murder, and extortion
- Reward amount: ₹10 lakh

Anand Pal Singh (31 May 1975 – 24 June 2017) was an Indian gangster mainly active in the cities of Rajasthan. He was a most-wanted gangster with a reward of ₹10 lakh on his head. He was accused of multiple murders as well as extortion.

His alleged encounter resulted in protests across Rajasthan. His community, family, and lawyers alleged says that he wanted to surrender, but he started firing from AK47 police at the time of surrender so in self defence police fired on police which lead to an encounter,His family demands CBI investigation.

== Early life ==
Singh was born in Sanvrad in Rajasthan in a Ravana Rajput family to father Hukam Singh Chouhan and mother Nirmal Kanwar.

After his marriage he earned a Bachelor of Education (BEd) degree and started a cement business.

== Career ==
After Anandpal got married in 1992 he wanted to become a government servant and later started his cement agency business and a milk dairy.

Later, he became a gangster. He was influenced by Dawood Ibrahim.

=== Political ambitions ===
Anandpal's political ambitions began to take shape in 1999–2000 when he fought the election for Panchayat Samiti member of Sanvrad village. He won and later fought the election of Pradhan of Ladnu Panchayat Samiti. He was defeated by a margin of two votes by Jagnath Burdak, the son of former cabinet minister Harajiram Burdak.

In November 2000, the election for Ladnu Panchayat Samiti committees took place. Singh and a senior Congress leader at that time came in direct conflict. A police case was lodged against Singh for disrupting government work when he did not let a contender file nomination papers. Supporters of Singh alleged that this happened under pressure from senior police officers and politicians. He was indicted for threatening, extortion and violence to make the case non-bailable.

=== Love for guns ===
Anandpal was fond of AK-47 rifles. When he was arrested at a farm house near Jaipur in 2012, he was found in possession of an AK-47, bullet-proof vests and bullets. He allegedly used an AK-47 to fire on policemen at this encounter.

A number of his underworld acts involved Anuradha Chaudhary, a mastermind in his gang.

=== Escape from police custody ===
In 2012 he was imprisoned, but escaped on 3 September 2015 when he was traveling to Ajmer high security jail from a court hearing. Three masked people fired on the police van in Khokhar village near Parbatsar, and Singh and two others escaped. This placed him in the top slot on the list of most wanted criminals in Rajasthan. He carried the highest cash reward Rajasthan police had ever offered Rs 10 lakh.

Rajasthan police spent crores of rupees on resources for catching the criminal.

After escaping from police custody, Anandpal was accused of killing a policeman when a police team tried to stop his vehicle in Gudha Bhagwandas.

=== Allegations ===
The Rajasthan police stated that Singh and his brothers amassed wealth after entering the world of crime. "Anandpal’s brother Manjeet Singh was in prison in a murder case since 2001. He himself and another brother Vikki had been on the run from the law. There are no known source of income for the family, but Anandpal’s daughter spent nearly Rs. 20 lakh on engineering studies in Dubai," said the statement. The statement further said that Anandpal's other daughter was studying at an expensive school in Pune as was his son. "There are two flats owned by the family in Jaipur’s posh colonies. Each one of them is valued more than Rs 60 lakh. The police confiscated nearly 370 bigha of land," said the statement adding that he owned properties in Kuchaman, Jaipur, Hanumangarh, Sikar and Churu. The family also owns a mine in Makarana, apart from several 'benami' properties.

=== Lifestyle ===
Anandpal was considered unique in his status as a criminal in Rajasthan whose aides would often engage in acts of self-sacrifice. In a gang-war in Bikaner Central Jail in July 2014, his close aide Balveer Banuda jumped in front of bullets when Anandpal's enemies tried to shoot him.

Singh had serious charges against him, including murder, robbery and extortion. Despite having these charges on his head, he had developed Robin Hood image among people. His Facebook image uploads and his video uploads on YouTube gives evidence of his fearless life. Black goggles, black hat, moustache, beard, leather jacket and his huge and solid physical appearance resembled a Bollywood style gangster.

=== Robin Hood style ===
Amarpal was particularly known for his acts of wealth redistribution, giving to the poor and stealing from the rich. As a result of this, he got a reputation as a Robin Hood-type figure and had garnered support among some members of lower-income communities for his actions.

== Interests ==
He was interested in novels and always carried books. Super Brain and Life of Pi were said to be found by the police after his encounter in his Mahindra Scorpio.

== Before death ==
In May 2017, Anandpal attempted to surrender. His advocates met Governor of Rajasthan, Kalyan Singh, in Jaipur who told them that he is a patriot and that if he will be given security he wanted to surrender. A fair investigation was demanded on his behalf to the Chief Justice of High Court. In the court, it was said that the injustice of leaders had led him to this situation and now all these leaders wanted him dead. Anandpal's lawyer A.P. Singh also wrote to the Chief Justice, stating that the court should conduct a fair investigation under the direction of a judge because Anandpal had not committed any crime. He added that Anandpal ran away because his companion Balveer Banuda was killed inside the jail by his enemy Raju Theth. If he had not escaped then he too would have been killed as he was not safe inside the jail. His lawyer alleged that if any lawyer in Rajasthan wants to represent Anandpal, the police overwhelm him in false cases.

== Death ==
=== Official story ===
As per police and government officials, he was shot dead at midnight in a raid by the Special Operations Group Anti-Terrorist Squad (India) of the Rajasthan Police at Malasar in Churu district on 24 June 2017.

=== Public story ===
His family and many others reject the official story and blame the police for his death.

Anandpal's sister, family and lawyers also said that Anandpal wanted to surrender, but government mainly the former chief minister of Rajasthan Vasundhara Raje and former home minister Gulab Chand Kataria wanted him dead. They asked for protection from the government, court and police.

== In popular culture ==
Crime Patrol Dial 100 - Ep 686 - Full Episode - 8 January 2018 (Full story is based on his lifestyle).

A web series from Zee5 called Rangbaaz Phirse was made in 2019 and released in December 2019 portraying the life of Anandpal. Singh is played by actor Jimmy Sheirgill as Amarpal Singh.
