= Rishi Tripathi =

Member of the Uttar Pradesh Legislative Assembly

Member of Uttar Pradesh Legislative Assembly
- Incumbent
- Assumed office March 2022
- Preceded by: Aman Mani Tripathi
- Constituency: Nautanwa

Personal details
- Born: 9 June 1983 (age 42) Gorakhpur, Uttar Pradesh
- Party: Bharatiya Janata Party
- Parent: Sunil Dutt Tripathi (father)
- Profession: Politician

Rishi Tripathi is an Indian politician and a member of the 18th Uttar Pradesh Assembly from the Nautanwa Assembly constituency of the Maharajganj district. He is a member of the NISHAD Party.

== Early life ==
Rishi Tripathi was born on 9 June 1983 in Gorakhpur, Uttar Pradesh, to a Hindu family of Sunil Dutt Tripathi. He married Abhilasha Tripathi on 28 January 2013, and they have one child.

== See also ==
- Hata Assembly constituency
- 18th Uttar Pradesh Assembly
- Uttar Pradesh Legislative Assembly
