= Sanvrad =

- village
- Location in Rajasthan, India Sanvrad (India)
- Coordinates: 27.516495°N 74.493828°E
- Country: India
- State: Rajasthan
- District: Nagour
- Established: Before 1190

Population (2001)
  - Total: 2,820

Languages
  - Official: Hindi
- Time zone: UTC+5:30 (IST)
- PIN: 341303
- Telephone code: 91-158-XX XX XXX
- ISO 3166 code: RJ-IN
- Vehicle registration: RJ-37
- Nearest city: Didwana

Sanvrad is a village in Ladnun tehsil of Nagaur district in Rajasthan, India. Saraad is 107 km east of Nagaur district and 22 km south of Ladnun Tehsil headquarters. It has nearly 400 houses. It was founded before 1190.

The village attracted national attention due to Anandpal Singh Chouhan.
