= Nautanwa Assembly constituency =

Constituency of the Uttar Pradesh legislative assembly in India Adarsh Pandey

Coordinates: 27.43°N 83.42°E

Nautanwa
- Constituency No. 316 for the Uttar Pradesh Legislative Assembly

Constituency details
- Country: India
- Region: North India
- State: Uttar Pradesh
- District: Maharajganj
- Reservation: None

Member of Legislative Assembly
- 18th Uttar Pradesh Legislative Assembly
- Incumbent Rishi Tripathi
- Party: NISHAD
- Alliance: NDA
- Elected year: 2022

Nautanwa is a constituency of the Uttar Pradesh Legislative Assembly covering the city of Nautanwa in the Maharajganj district of Uttar Pradesh, India.

Nautanwa is one of five assembly constituencies in the Maharajganj Lok Sabha constituency. Since 2008, this assembly constituency is numbered 316 amongst 403 constituencies.

== Members of the Legislative Assembly ==
Year	Member	Party
Till 2012 : See Lakshmipur
2012	Kaushal Kishore Singh	Indian National Congress
2017	Aman Mani Tripathi	Independent
2022	Rishi Tripathi	NISHAD Party

== Election results ==
=== 2027 ===
2027 Uttar Pradesh Legislative Assembly election: Nauntanwa
Party	Candidate	Votes	%	±%
INDIA				
NDA				
BSP				
NOTA	None of the above			
Majority				
Turnout				
gain from		Swing		

=== 2022 ===
2022 Uttar Pradesh Legislative Assembly election: Nautanwa
Party	Candidate	Votes	%	±%
NISHAD	Rishi Tripathi	90,263	40.03	+37.5
SP	Kunwar Kaushal Singh	74,932	33.23	+11.17
BSP	Aman Mani Tripathi	46,128	20.46	+8.27
INC	Sada Mohan	5,071	2.25	
Jan Adhikar Party	Nagendra Prasad	3,152	1.4	+0.97
NOTA	None of the above	2,061	0.91	−0.74
Majority		15,331	6.8	−8.21
Turnout		225,463	61.5	+0.03
NISHAD gain from Independent		Swing		

=== 2017 ===
Independent candidate Aman Mani Tripathi won in last Assembly election of 2017 Uttar Pradesh Legislative Elections defeating Indian National Congress candidate Kunwar Kaushal Kishore Singh by a margin of 32,256 votes.

2017 Assembly Elections: Nautanwa
Party	Candidate	Votes	%	±%
Independent	Aman Mani Tripathi	79,666	37.07	
SP	Kunwar Kaushal Kishore Singh	47,410	22.06	
BJP	Sameer Tripathi	45,050	20.96	
BSP	Aijaz Ahmad	26,210	12.19	
NISHAD	Anil Kumar Nishad	5,447	2.53	
RLD	Sada Mohan Upadhyay	2,770	1.29	
NOTA	None of the above	3,490	1.65	
Majority		32,256	15.01	
Turnout		214,927	61.47	
Independent gain from INC		Swing	▼2.88	

=== 2012 ===
2012 Assembly Elections: Nautanwa
Party	Candidate	Votes	%	±%
INC	Kunwar Kaushal Kishore Singh	76,584	40.56	Steady
SP	Aman Mani Tripathi	68,747	36.41	Steady
BSP	Sada Mohan Upadhyay	28,819	15.26	Steady
BJP	Ashok Kumar	6,101	3.23	Steady
	Remainder 10 Candidates	8,566	4.54	Steady
Majority		7,837	4.15	Steady
Turnout		1,88,817	61.56	Steady
INC gain from SP		Swing		
