= Lakshmipur Assembly constituency =

Former constituency of the Uttar Pradesh legislative assembly in India

Lakshmipur

Constituency details
- Country: India
- Region: North India
- State: Uttar Pradesh
- District: Maharajganj
- Lok Sabha constituency: Maharajganj Lok Sabha constituency

Lakshmipur Vidhan Sabha constituency was one of the 425 Vidhan Sabha constituencies of Uttar Pradesh state in central India. It was a part of the Maharajganj district and one of the assembly constituencies in the Maharajganj Lok Sabha constituency. Lakshmipur Assembly constituency came into existence in 1967 and ceased to exist in 2008 as a result of "Delimitation of Parliamentary and Assembly Constituencies Order, 2008".

== Members of Legislative Assembly ==
Year	Member	Party
1967	Raghuraj Singh	Bharatiya Jana Sangh
1969	Ram Lagan Dubey	Indian National Congress
1974	Abdul Rauf Lari	Bharatiya Kranti Dal
1977	Abdul Rauf Lari	Janata Party
1980	Election postponed due to death of candidate	
1981^	Virendra Pratap Shahi	Independent
1985	Virendra Pratap Shahi	Independent
1989	Amarmani Tripathi	Indian National Congress
1991	Kunwar Akhilesh Singh	Janata Party
1993	Kunwar Akhilesh Singh	Samajwadi Party
1996	Amarmani Tripathi	Indian National Congress
2002	Amarmani Tripathi	Bahujan Samaj Party
2007	Amarmani Tripathi	Samajwadi Party
2012 onwards : See Nautanwa

^By-Poll

== See also ==
- Maharajganj district
- Maharajganj Lok Sabha constituency
- Uttar Pradesh
