= List of colleges affiliated to the Dr. A. P. J. Abdul Kalam Technical University, Lucknow =

As of 2018, Dr. A.P.J. Abdul Kalam Technical University (AKTU), formerly Uttar Pradesh Technical University, has a total of 592 institutes affiliated to it located across 55 districts of Uttar Pradesh. Lucknow district has the higher number of colleges (80), followed by Ghaziabad (63), Gautam Buddha Nagar (56), Meerut (55) and Kanpur Nagar (41), the five districts together accounting for almost half (295) the total number of colleges.

The university has three constituent colleges, three associated colleges and three colleges which have been granted autonomous status.

== Colleges by city ==
District	City	Number of colleges 753
Agra district	Agra	19
Aligarh district	Aligarh	11
Allahabad district	Allahabad	22
Ambedkar Nagar district	Akbarpur	1
Amethi district	Amethi	2
Amroha district	Amroha	7
Amroha district	Gajraula	2
Azamgarh district	Azamgarh	6
Baghpat district	Baghpat	4
Ballia district	Ballia	1
Balrampur district	Balrampur	1
Banda district	Banda	2
Barabanki district	Barabanki	13
Bareilly district	Bareilly	26
Bhadohi district	Bhadohi	1
Bijnor district	Bijnor	10
Bijnor district	Dhampur	1
Bijnor district	Najibabad	1
Bulandshahr district	Bulandshahr	9
Bulandshahr district	Khurja	2
Etawah district	Etawah	4
Faizabad district	Faizabad	3
Farrukhabad district	Farrukhabad	2
Fatehpur district	Fatehpur	3
Firozabad district	Firozabad	1
Gautam Buddha Nagar district	Dadri	4
Gautam Buddha Nagar district	Greater Noida	47
Gautam Buddha Nagar district	Noida	5
Ghaziabad district	Ghaziabad	49
Ghaziabad district	Modinagar	11
Ghaziabad district	Muradnagar	3
Ghazipur district	Ghazipur	3
Gonda district	Gonda	5
Gorakhpur district	Gorakhpur	10
Hapur district	Garhmukteshwar	1
Hapur district	Hapur	3
Hardoi district	Hardoi	1
Hathras district	Hathras	1
Jaunpur district	Jaunpur	4
Jhansi district	Jhansi	8
Kannauj district	Kannauj	1
Kanpur district	Kanpur	47
Kanpur Dehat district	Kanpur Dehat	6
Kasganj district	Kasganj	1
Kaushambi district	Kaushambi	5
Lalitpur district	Lalitpur	2
Lucknow district	Lucknow	80
Maharajganj district	Maharajganj	3
Mainpuri district	Mainpuri	1
Mathura district	Mathura	20
Mau district	Mau	1
Meerut district	Meerut	55
Mirzapur district	Mirzapur	4
Moradabad district	Moradabad	9
Muzaffarnagar district	Muzaffarnagar	8
Raebareli district	Raebareli	2
Rampur district	Rampur	1
Saharanpur district	Saharanpur	13
Shahjahanpur district	Shahjahanpur	3
Sitapur district	Sitapur	3
Sonbhadra district	Sonbhadra	1
Sultanpur district	Sultanpur	6
Unnao district	Unnao	7
Varanasi district	Varanasi	17
Total		597

== List of colleges ==
=== Agra ===
S.No	Institute Code	Name of College
1	001	Anand Engineering College, Artoni
2	002	Faculty of Engineering & Technology, Agra College
3	004	Raja Balwant Singh Engineering Technical Campus
4	005	Raja Balwant Singh Management Technical Campus
5	006	Agra Public Institute of Technology & Computer Education, Artoni
6	243	College of Pharmacy, Jakhoda
7	244	Anand College of Pharmacy
8	324	Anjali College of Pharmacy & Science Etmadpur
9	338	K.P. Engineering College, Etmadpur
10	394	College of Business Studies, Sikandara
11	448	Neelam College of Engineering & Technology, Kirawali
12	547	Chaudhary Beeri Singh College of Engineering & Management, Near Peeli Pokhar, Teh.- Etmadpur
13	617	Uttam Institute of Management Studies, Runakta, Kirawali Road
14	659	Heritage Institute of Hotel & Tourism
15	697	Agra Public College of Technology & Management
16	706	Agra Vansthali Mahavidyalaya
17	798	Anand college of Architecture
18	799	ACE College of Engineering & Management, Etmadpura
19	812	CBS College of Management

=== Akbarpur ===
S.No	Institute Code	Name of College
1	737	Rajkiya Engineering College, Ambedkar Nagar

=== Aligarh ===
S.No	Institute Code	Name of College
1	007	Shivadan Singh Institute of Technology and Management
2	109	Aligarh College of Engineering & Technology
3	175	Al Barkat Institute of Management Studies
4	234	Aligarh College of Pharmacy
5	339	ACN College of Engineering & Management Studies, Kasimpur Road, VIll.- Cherrat
6	340	Vivekanand College of Technology & Management, Near Khair Road
7	341	Institute of Technology & Management, Aligarh-Palwal-Delhi Road, Karsua
8	518	SSLD Varshney Engineering College, Aligarh - Kanpur G.T. Road
9	524	Vision Institute of Technology, Shahpur Madrak
10	689	Institute of Information Management & Technology
11	708	SSLD Varshney Institute of Management & Engineering

=== Allahabad ===
S.No	Institute Code	Name of College
1	010	United College of Engineering & Research
2	011	United Institute of Management
3	110	Institute of Engineering & Rural Technology
4	138	B.B.S.College of Engineering and Technology
5	155	Ewing Christian Institute of Management & Technology
6	162	Shambhunath Institute of Engg. & Technology
7	241	Shambhunath Institute of Pharmacy
8	283	LDC Institute of Technical Studies
9	284	United Institute of Technology
10	315	United Institute of Pharmacy, United College of Engg. & Research
11	342	United College of Engineering & Management
12	411	H.M.F.A.Memorial Institute of Engineering & Technology
13	461	Chatrapati Shahu Ji Maharaj College of Engineering and Technology
14	575	Malti Memorial Trusts CSM "group of Institutions", Faculty of B. Pharmacy
15	576	Faculty of Management, CSM Group of Institutions
16	625	Sanskar College of Management & Computer Application
17	643	Abhay Memorial Trust Group of Institutions
18	657	Krishnarpit Institute of Pharmacy
19	661	Krishnarpit Institute of Management & Technology
20	688	Devprayag Institute of Management
21	727	Shambhunath Institute of Management
22	740	Prayag Institute of Technology & Management

=== Amethi ===
S.No	Institute Code	Name of College
1	167	Rajarshi Rananjay Singh College of Pharmacy
2	383	Rajarshi Rananjay Singh Institute of Management & Technology

=== Amroha district ===
==== Amroha ====
S.No	Institute Code	Name of College
1	256	DNS College of Engineering & Technology, Didoli
2	493	Maharaja Agrasen College of Engineering & Technology, Dhanaura
3	647	Indraprasth Institute of Technology
4	780	Landmark Technical Campus Didauli
5	815	Amani Group of Institutions, Amroha
6	859	Mesco Institute of Pharmacy
7	886	Yogendra Nath Saxena College of Pharmacy & Research

==== Gajraula ====
S.No	Institute Code	Name of College
1	726	Institute of Management & Science
2	825	IMS

=== Azamgarh ===
S.No	Institute Code	Name of College
1	012	Pharmacy College
2	233	R.K Pharmacy College
3	455	Navneet College of Technology & Management, Azamgarh
4	535	Rajendra Prasad College of Management
5	736	Rajkiya Engineering College, Azamgarh
6	860	RAHUL SANKRITYAYAN COLLEGE OF PHARMACY
7	920	RAMDENI SINGH JAGDISH SINGH MEMORIAL SAMITI, BAGHAWER, AZAMGARH

=== Baghpat ===
S.No	Institute Code	Name of College
1	013	Shri Gopichand College of Pharmacy
2	542	Shri Krishan College of Engineering, Singhawali Ahir
3	800	JagMohan Institute of Management and Technology, Khekada
4	861	SARAS COLLEGE OF PHARMACY

=== Ballia ===
S.No	Institute Code	Name of College
1	764	Smt.Fulehra Smarak College of Pharmacy

=== Balrampur ===
S.No	Institute Code	Name of College
1	261	Shakti College of Pharmacy, Dulhinpur

=== Banda ===
S.No	Institute Code	Name of College
1	139	Kali Charan Nigam Institute of Technology
2	734	Rajkiya Engineering College, Banda

=== Barabanki ===
S.No	Institute Code	Name of College
1	141	Sagar Institute of Technology & Management
2	269	Sherwood College of Pharmacy
3	281	Sherwood College of Engineering Research & Technology
4	301	Sagar Institute of Technology & Management Department of Pharmacy
5	345	Seth Vishambhar Nath Institute of Engineering & Technology
6	447	Gokaran Narvadeshwar Institute of Technology & Management
7	545	Jahangirabad Educational Trust's Group of Institutions, Faculty of Engineering
8	599	Jahangirabad Educational Trust's Group of Institutions, Faculty of Management
9	669	Seth Vishambhar Nath Institute of Management Studies & Research
10	862	Seth Vishambhar Nath Institute of Pharmaceutical Sciences
11	863	Seth Vishambhar Nath Institute of Pharmacy
12	864	TRC MAHAVIDYALAYA, DEPARTMENT OF PHARMACY
13	865	AUROUS INSTITUTE OF MANAGEMENT

=== Bareilly ===
S.No	Institute Code	Name of College
1	014	Shri Ram Murti Smarak College of Engineering & Technology
2	016	Rakshpal Bahadur Management Institute
3	142	Khandelwal College of Management Science and Technology
4	169	Rakshpal Bahadur College of Pharmacy
5	319	Rakshpal Bahadur College of Engineering & Technology
6	450	Shri Ram Murti Smarak College of Engineering, Technology & Research
7	474	Shri Siddhi Vinayak Institute of Technology
8	475	Shri Jeet Ram Smarak Institute of Engg. and Technology
9	476	Future Institute of Engineering & Technology
10	479	Rajshree Institute of Management & Technology
11	486	A.N.A. College of Engineering & Management
12	566	Future Institute of Management and Technology
13	595	Srajan Institute of Management & Technology
14	597	Khandelwal College of Architecture & Design
15	604	Prem Prakash Gupta Institute of Management
16	635	Jyoti College of Management Science and Technology
17	653	Prem Prakash Gupta Institute of Engineering
18	687	ANA College of Management Studies
19	703	Shri Siddhi Vinayak Institute of Management
20	757	Utkarsh College of Management Education
21	760	Lotus Institute of Management
22	827	Mascot Institute of Management
23	850	Future Institute of Pharmacy
24	866	A.N.A Institute of Pharmaceutical Sciences & Research
25	867	S.R. INSTITUTE OF PHARMACY
26	868	STELLER INSTITUTE OF PHARMACY

=== Bhadohi ===
S.No	Institute Code	Name of College
1	112	Indian Institute of Carpet Technology

=== Bijnor district ===
==== Bijnor ====
S.No	Institute Code	Name of College
1	017	Kunwar Satya Vira College of Engineering & Management
2	210	Vivek College of Technical Education
3	438	Vivek College of Management & Technology
4	481	KLS institute oF Engineering & Technology, Vill- Khudaheri, Bijnor -Hardwar Road
5	499	Veer Kunwar Institute of Technology
6	501	R.V. Institute of Technology
7	735	Rajkiya Engineering College, Bijnor
8	844	Janta College of Pharmacy
9	845	Krishna Pharmacy College
10	869	Krishna Institute

==== Dhampur ====
S.No	Institute Code	Name of College	Fields of study
1	306	Disha Institute of Science & Technology, Dhampur	Management, Computer Science

==== Najibabad ====
S.No	Institute Code	Name of College	Fields of Study
1	480	North India Institute of Technology	Engineering, Management

=== Bulandshahr district ===
==== Bulandshahr ====
S.No	Institute Code	Name of College
1	018	Babu Banarsi Das Institute of Engineering Technology & Research Centre
2	019	Marathwada Institute of Technology
3	395	V.Tech Institute Of Integrated Technology
4	671	Brahmanand Group of Institutions
5	785	G & R Institute of Management and Technology
6	790	School of Business Management and Technology, Khurja Road
7	806	Brahmanand Institute of Research Technology & Management
8	870	D.N. College
9	871	Hillwood Medical School

==== Khurja ====
S.No	Institute Code	Name of College
1	710	Ch. Harchand Singh College of Management
2	741	J.K. Institute of Pharmacy and Management, Khurja

=== Etawah ===
S.No	Institute Code	Name of College
1	171	Shri R.L.T. Institute of Pharmaceutical Science & Technology
2	236	Sri Madan Lal Institute of Pharmacy
3	265	Sir Madan Lal Institute of Management
4	603	Shri RLT Institute of Management

=== Faizabad ===
S.No	Institute Code	Name of College
1	026	Faculty of Management, Jhunjhunwala Degree College
2	743	Bhavdiya Institute of Business Management
3	851	Bhavdiya Institute of Pharmaceutical Sciences and Research

=== Farrukhabad ===
S.No	Institute Code	Name of College
1	759	Dr. Om Prakash Institute of Management & Technology
2	872	Dr. Om Prakash School Of Pharmacy

=== Fatehpur ===
S.No	Institute Code	Name of College
1	456	Pratap College of Management, Vill.Sindhav
2	590	Trivedi Institute of Management & Technology
3	873	Shiv Bali Singh Group of Educational and Training Institute College of Pharmacy

=== Firozabad ===
S.No	Institute Code	Name of College
1	541	Dushyant college of pharmacy

=== Gautam Buddha Nagar district ===
==== Dadri ====
S.No	Institute Code	Name of College
1	096	Vishveshwarya Group of Institutions
2	204	R.V. Northland Institute
3	286	Vishveshwarya Institute of Technology
4	533	R.V. Northland Institute of Management

==== Greater Noida ====
S.No	Institute Code	Name of College
1	088	Apeejay Institute of Technology, School of Architecture & Planning
2	090	IEC College of Engineering and Technology
3	093	Ram-Eesh Institute of Vocational and Technical Education
4	094	Galgotias Institute of Management & Technology
5	097	Galgotias College of Engineering and Technology
6	099	Harlal Institute of Management & Technology
7	132	Greater Noida Institute of Technology
8	133	Noida Institute of Engineering and Technology
9	150	IILM College of Engineering and Technology
10	151	Global Institute of Information Technology
11	152	Mangalmay Institute of Engineering & Technology
12	153	Sky line Institute of Engineering & Technology
13	172	Lloyd Institute of Management & Technology
14	192	GL Bajaj Institute of Technology and Management
15	193	United College of Engineering and Research
16	211	Rakshpal Bahadur Management Institute
17	212	United Institute of Management
18	214	H.I.M.T. College of Pharmacy
19	216	IIMT College of Engineering
20	222	I.T.S. Engineering College
21	225	Accurate Institute of Management and Technology
22	227	Innovative College of Pharmacy
23	230	Dronacharya Group of Institutions
24	238	NIMT Institute of Hospital & Pharma Management
25	247	I.I.M.T. College of Pharmacy
26	272	Greater Noida Institute of Technology (MBA Institute)
27	273	Noida Institute of Engineering & Technology (MCA Institute)
28	277	Patronage Institute of Management Studies
29	295	B.B.S. Institute of Pharmaceutical & Allied Science
30	323	Spectrum Institute of Pharmaceutical Science & Research
31	492	KCC Institute of Technology and Management
32	588	Prince Institute of Innovative Technology
33	654	Sarvottam Institute of Technology & Management
34	663	KCC Institute of Management
35	681	Lloyd Business School
36	686	Accurate Institute of Advanced Management
37	692	Sky Line Institute of Management & Technology
38	717	FMG Academy Group of Institutions
39	786	Mangalmay Institute of Engineering and Technology, Knowledge Park
40	801	G.L Bajaj Institute of Management and Research
41	803	Greater Noida Institute of Business Management
42	805	Accurate Institute of Architercture & Panning
43	810	Greater Noida College of Technology
44	852	Metro College of Health Sciences & Research
45	874	Ch. Charan Singh College of Pharmacy
46	875	Skyline Institute of Pharmacy
47	876	Maharishi Institute of Management

==== Noida ====
S.No	Institute Code	Name of College
1	091	J.S.S. Academy of Technical Education
2	095	Mahatma Gandhi Mission College of Engineering & Technology
3	098	Institute of Management Studies
4	733	Hierank Business School
5	857	U.P. Institute of Design, Noida

=== Ghaziabad district ===
==== Ghaziabad ====
S.No	Institute Code	Name of College
1	027	Ajay Kumar Garg Engineering College
2	028	Ideal Institute of Technology
3	030	Indraprastha Engineering College
4	032	ABES Engineering College
5	033	Raj Kumar Goel Institute of Technology
6	035	Babu Banarasi Das Institute of Technology, Duhai
7	036	Institute of Management Studies, Ghaziabad
8	037	Institute of Management Education
9	038	Institute of Technology & Science, Mohan Nagar
10	039	Institute of Management and Research
11	113	Integrated Academy of Management & Technology{inmantec}
12	114	Institute of Professional Excellence & Management
13	116	Jaipuria institute of management
14	117	Ram Chameli Chaddha Vishwas Girls College
15	143	IMS Engineering College
16	161	Krishna Engineering College
17	194	H.R. Institute of Technology, Morta
18	215	Sanskar College of Engineering & Technology
19	220	Hi-Tech Institute of Engineering & Technology
20	223	Viveknanad Institute of Technology & Science, Jindal Nagar
21	231	R.D. Engineering College, Duhai
22	237	H.R. Institute of Hotel Management, Morta
23	240	Sunderdeep Engineering College, Dasna
24	245	H.R. Institute of Pharmacy, Morta
25	259	Sunderdeep Pharmacy College, Dasna
26	290	ABES Institute of Technology
27	326	Sunder Deep College of Hotel Management, Dasna
28	327	Sunder Deep College of Architecture, Dasna
29	331	Devender Singh Institute of Technology & Management
30	333	Raj Kumar Goel Institute of Technology & Management
31	334	Rishi Chadha Vishvas Girls Institute of Technology for Women
32	389	Oxford College of Pharmacy, Mussori-Gulawati, NTPC Road
33	412	Aryan Institute of Technology, Jindal Nagar
34	414	Bhagwati Institute of Technology and Science, Masuri
35	579	HLM College, 11 km. Delhi-Meerut Road
36	622	Modern Institute of Technology and Management, Duhai
37	645	Ideal Institute of Management and Technology
38	679	ITERC College of Management
39	783	R.D. Engineering College Research Center, Duhai
40	792	Institute of Advanced Management and Research
41	796	Adhunik College of Engineering, Duhai
42	797	Adhunik Institute of Productivity Management and Research
43	802	Nitra Technical Campus
44	820	Ajay Kumar Garg Institute of Management
45	826	Sanskar College of Architecture & Planning
46	834	Integrated Academy of management & Technology
47	836	Bhagwant Institute of Technology
48	846	Sanskar College of Pharmacy & Research
49	877	BBDIT COLLEGE OF PHARMACY

==== Modinagar ====
S.No	Institute Code	Name of College
1	077	Dr. K.N.Modi institute of Engineering & Technology
2	078	Dr. K.N. Modi Institute of Pharmaceutical Science & Research
3	079	Unique Institute of Management & Technology
4	195	KNGD Modi Engineering College
5	226	D.J.College of Engineering & Technology
6	445	Dr. Ram Manohar Lohia Institute
7	449	K.S. Jain Institute of Engineering & Technology
8	507	R.D. Foundations Group of Institutions, Faculty of Engineering, Kadrabad
9	587	RD Foundation's Group of Institutions, Faculty of Management
10	878	D.J. College of Pharmacy
11	879	Dr. Ram Manohar Lohia College of Pharmacy

==== Muradnagar ====
S.No	Institute Code	Name of College
1	029	Krishna Institute of Engineering and Technology
2	170	I.T.S. College of Pharmacy
3	199	KIET School of Pharmacy

=== Ghazipur ===
S.No	Institute Code	Name of College
1	040	Technical Education & Research Institute
2	880	Lutawan Institute of Pharmacy
3	881	Satyadeo College of Pharmacy

=== Gonda ===
S.No	Institute Code	Name of College
1	041	Acharya Narendra Dev College of Pharmacy
2	118	Nandani Nagar Mahavidayala College of Pharmacy
3	390	K.R.S. College of Pharmacy
4	403	K.R.S. College of Management
5	752	Nandini Nagar Technical Campus

=== Gorakhpur ===
S.No	Institute Code	Name of College
1	120	Institute of Technology & Management
2	408	Chandra Mauli Institute of Management Sciences & Technology
3	490	Suyash Institute of Information Technology
4	516	Kailash Institute of Pharmacy & Management
5	517	KIPM College of Management
6	525	Buddha Institute of Technology
7	571	Dr. B.R. Ambedkar Pooja College of Pharmacy
8	751	KIPM College of Engineering & Technology
9	766	Purvanchal Institute of Architecture & Design, Gida
10	882	tahira institute of medical sciences

=== Hapur district ===
==== Garhmukteshwar ====
S.No	Institute Code	Name of College
1	413	Vedant Institute of Management & Technology

==== Hapur ====
S.No	Institute Code	Name of College
1	224	Lord Krishna College of Engineering, Pilkhuwa
2	330	Saraswati Institute of Engineering & Technology, Pilkhuwa
3	705	JMS Group of Institutions

=== Hardoi ===
S.No	Institute Code	Name of College
1	260	Ibne Seena Pharmacy College

=== Hathras ===
S.No	Institute Code	Name of College
1	512	MASS College of Engineering and Management, Hathras

=== Jaunpur ===
S.No	Institute Code	Name of College
1	144	Prasad Institute of Technology
2	453	Kunwar Haribansh Singh College of Pharmacy
3	746	Kunwar Haribansh Singh Institute of Management
4	883	RDS College of Pharmacy

=== Jhansi ===
S.No	Institute Code	Name of College
1	043	Bundelkhand Institute of Engineering & Technology
2	145	SR Group of Institutions College of Science and Engineering
3	168	Smt. Vidyawati College of Pharmacy
4	387	SR Group of Institutions College of Pharmacy
5	715	SR Group of Institutions College of Engineering Management & Technology
6	855	Shri Rawatpura Sarkar Institute of Pharmacy
7	884	Doodhnath College of Pharmacy
8	885	M.C.S.College of Science And Technology

=== Kannauj ===
S.No	Institute Code	Name of College
1	839	Rajkiya Engineering College, Kannauj

=== Kanpur ===
S.No	Institute Code	Name of College
1	044	Uttar Pradesh Textile Technology Institute
2	046	Maharana Pratap Engineering College
3	047	Dr. Virendra Swarup Institute of Computer Studies
4	048	Dayanand Academy of Management Studies
5	050	College of Management Studies
6	164	Pranveer Singh Institute of Technology
7	165	Kanpur Institute of Technology
8	166	Dr. Ambedkar Institute of Technology For Handicapped
9	181	S.T.E.P.- H.B.T.I.
10	188	Advanced Institute of Bio-Tech & Paramedical Sciences
11	200	Maharana Pratap College of Pharmacy
12	246	Dayanand Dinanath College, Institute of Pharmacy
13	287	Naraina College of Engineering & Technology
14	307	Dayanad Deena Nath College of Management
15	348	PSIT College of Engineering
16	349	Maharana Institute of Professional Studies
17	350	Indus Institute of Technology & Management
18	351	Krishna Institute of Technology
19	353	Apollo Institute of Technology
20	429	Naraina Vidya Peeth Engineering & Management Institute
21	434	Jagran Institute of Management
22	440	Naraina Vidya Peeth Management Institute
23	505	Allenhouse Institute of Technology
24	522	Maharana Prataap College of Engineering
25	523	Vision Institute of Technology
26	546	Seth Sriniwas Agarwal Institute of Engineering and Technology
27	550	Kanpur Institute of Technology & Pharmacy
28	554	Naraina Vidya Peeth Group of Institutions Faculty of Pharmacy
29	568	Seth Sri Nivas Agarwal Institute of Management
30	584	Banshi College of Management & Technology
31	607	Dr Virendra Swaroop Institute of Professional Studies
32	719	Axis Institute of Technology & Management
33	720	Axis Institute of Fashion Technology
34	721	Axis Institute of Architecture
35	722	Axis Business School
36	723	Axis Institute of Planning and Management
37	843	Asian Institute of Management & Higher Studies
38	848	PSIT COLLEGE OF MANAGEMENT
39	853	NARAINA SCHOOL OF PLANNING & ARCHITECTURE
40	887	VISION INSTITUTE OF MANAGEMENT
41	889	Maharana Pratap College of Pharmaceutical Sciences
42	990	DR. VIRENDRA SWARUP MEMORIAL TRUST GROUP OF INSTITUIONS , KANPUR NAGAR
43	1137	AXIS INSTITUTE OF PHARMACY
44	1012	KRISHNA INSTITUTE OF PHARMACY AND SCIENCES
45	1013	SIGNA COLLEGE OF PHARMACY
46	1014	RADHA KRISHNA COLLEGE OF PHARMACY
47	1015	ADVANCE COLLEGE OF EDUCATION

=== Kanpur Dehat ===
S.No	Institute Code	Name of College
1	254	Bhabha Institute of Technology
2	355	Bhabha College of Engineering
3	419	Prabhat Engineering College
4	830	Devidayal Memorial Institutions
5	832	Kamal Institute of Technology
6	888	Sanskriti College of Higher Education and Studies

=== Kasganj ===
S.No	Institute Code	Name of College
1	494	Sri Sri Institute of Technology & Management

=== Kaushambi ===
S.No	Institute Code	Name of College
1	310	Dr. Rizvi College of Engineering, Karari
2	364	S P Memorial Institute of Technology
3	467	Madhu Vachaspati Institute of Engineering and Technology
4	552	Chandra Shekhar Singh College of Pharmacy
5	749	Madhu Vachaspati School of Management

=== Lalitpur ===
S.No	Institute Code	Name of College
1	890	Late Ravindranand Baronia College of Pharmacy Mahroni
2	891	Pahalwan Gurudeen College of Science and Technology
3	892	Maa Gayatri College of Pharmacy Lalitpur

=== Lucknow ===
S.No	Institute Code	Name of College
1	051	Faculty of Architecture, AKTU(Formerly: Lucknow College of Architecture & GCA)
2	052	Institute of Engineering and Technology(IET)
3	053	Azad Institute of Engineering & Technology
4	054	B.B.D National Institute of Tech. & Management
5	056	Babu Banarasi Das Northern India Institute of Technology
6	057	International Institute For Special Education (IISE)
7	058	Institute of Environment & Management
8	059	Lal Bahadur Shastri Institute of Management & Development Studies
9	061	Sherwood College of Management
10	062	Motilal Rastogi School of Management
11	122	Shri Ramswaroop College of Engineering & Management
12	123	Saroj Institute of Technology & Management
13	124	Institute of Co-Operative & Corporate Management, Research & Training
14	163	Dr. M.C. Saxena College of Engineering & Technology
15	177	Indira Gandhi Institute of Co-Operative Management
16	189	Central Institute of Plastic Engineering & Technology
17	196	College of Engineering, Science & Technology
18	197	Azad Institute of Pharmacy & Research
19	202	Hygia Institute of Pharmaceutical Education and Research
20	203	Rameshwaram Institute of Technology & Management
21	274	Narmadeshwar Management College
22	303	Dr. M.C.Saxena College of Pharmacy
23	316	Aryakul College of Pharmacy & Research
24	357	Aryavart Institute of Technology & Management
25	358	Rameshwaram Institute of Technology & Management
26	360	Goel Institute of Technology & Management
27	361	R.R. Institute of Modern Technology
28	362	Lucknow Institute of Technology
29	363	Ambalika Institute of Management & Technology
30	391	Mahatma Gandhi Institute of Pharmacy
31	392	Goel Institute of Pharmacy & Sciences
32	396	Aryakul College of Management
33	397	T.D.L. College of Technology & Management
34	398	Bhalchandra Institute of Education & Management
35	422	Bansal Institute of Engineering & Technology
36	423	School of Management Science (SMS Institute of Technology)
37	430	Maharana Institute of Technology & Sciences
38	431	B.N.College of Engineering & Technology
39	441	Central Institute of Management & Technology
40	442	Sardar Bhagat Singh College of Technology & Management
41	465	Himalayan Institute of Technology & Management
42	473	G.C.R.G. Memorial Trust's Group of Institutions, Faculty of Engineering
43	483	Institute of Technology & Management
44	484	Lucknow Model Institute of Technology & Management
45	485	S.R. Institute of Management & Technology
46	508	Babu Banarasi Das Engineering College
47	529	Saroj Institute of Management & Technology
48	538	AKS Management College, Bakshi-Ka-Talab
49	567	Bora Institute of Management Science
50	572	Lucknow Institute of Pharmacy
51	620	GCRG Memorial Trust's Group of Institutions, Faculty of Management
52	648	Babu Sundar Singh Institute of Technology & Management
53	649	M.G. Institute of Management & Technology
54	660	Goel Institute of Higher Studies
55	662	S S Institute of Management
56	666	SRM Business School
57	670	Lucknow Model Institute of Management
58	672	ITM School of Architecture and Town Planning
59	673	ITM School of Management
60	680	City College of Management & Technology
61	718	Heeralal Yadav Institute of Technology & Management
62	754	DNM Institute of Engineering & Technology
63	755	Basudev Institute of Management & Technology
64	756	Institute of Management Research & Technology
65	758	Shine College of Management
66	761	Maa Vaishno Devi Educational & Law College
67	762	Noble Institute of Management & Technology
68	765	Remote Sensing Application Centre
69	828	Dayal Group of Institutions
70	829	IILM Academy of Highier Learning
71	849	ISABELLA THOBURN COLLEGE
72	858	Centre for Advance Studies
73	892	F I PHARMACY COLLEGE
74	893	GCRG COLLEGE OF PHARMACY
75	894	GSRM MEMORIAL COLLEGE OF PHARMACY
76	895	HYGIA INSTITUTE OF PHARMACY
77	896	J. P. COLLEGE OF PHARMACY
78	897	Jan Kalyan Institute of Technical Excellence
79	898	YASH RAJ INSTITUTE OF PHARMACY
80	899	Sri Sharda Institute Of Management and Technology
81	1000	Hygia College Of Pharmacy

=== Maharajganj ===
S.No	Institute Code	Name of College
1	235	Rajeev Gandhi College of Pharmacy
2	472	Institute of Technology and Management
3	900	ITM College of Pharmacy

=== Mainpuri ===
S.No	Institute Code	Name of College
1	840	Rajkiya Engineering College, Mainpuri

=== Mathura ===
S.No	Institute Code	Name of College
1	064	Hindustan College of Science and Technology
2	065	B.S.A. College of Engineering & Technology
3	066	Rajeev Academy for Pharmacy
4	067	Hindustan Institute of Management & Computer Studies
5	126	Sachdeva Institute of Technology
6	173	Rajeev Academy for Technology & Management
7	239	Ishwarchand Vidyasagar Institute of Technology, Akbarpur
8	267	Sanjay College of Pharmacy
9	471	Eshan group of Institute
10	511	G.L. Bajaj Group of Institutions, Mathura Delhi Highway
11	536	Shree Jee Baba Institute of Professional Studies, Semari Chata
12	581	Shri Giriraj Maharaj Institute of Management, Mundesi Kosi Khurd
13	602	Aashlar Business School, Mahuan, Near Toll Plaza
14	605	Unnati Management College, Daulatpur, Farah
15	668	Edify Institute of Management & Technology
16	704	Shree Jee Goverdhan Maharaj College of Professional Studies
17	781	Hardayal Technical Campus
18	822	Eshan College of Management
19	901	Divya College of Pharmacy
20	902	NSS College of Management

=== Mau ===
S.No	Institute Code	Name of College
1	763	Maa Bhagwata Kunwar Institute of Management

=== Meerut ===
S.No	Institute Code	Name of College
1	068	Meerut Institute of Engineering and Technology
2	069	Radha Govind Group of Institutions
3	070	College of Engineering & Rural Technology
4	074	Dewan Institute of Management Studies
5	127	IIMT Engineering College
6	128	Bharat Institute of Technology
7	129	Forte Institute of Technology
8	157	Institute of Hotel Management, Catering Technology & Applied Nutrition
9	159	J.P. Institute of Hotel Management & Catering Technology
10	174	Kishan Institute of Information Technology
11	182	Kalka Institute for Research & Advanced Studies
12	201	NKBR College of Pharmacy & Research Centre
13	206	Translam Institute of Pharmaceutical Education & Research, Rajpura, Mawana Road
14	229	Vidya College of Engineering
15	263	Vidya School of Business
16	266	LTR Institute of Technology, Dharamsala-Bhagpat Road
17	271	Bharat Institute of Technology (MBA Institute)
18	282	J.P. Institute of Engineering & Technology
19	285	Institute of Technology & Management, Meerut-Baghpat Road, Panchli
20	292	Meerut Institute of Technology, Baral, Partapur
21	311	Deewan V.S. Institute of Engineering & Technology
22	312	ABSS Institute of Technology, Mawana Road
23	318	Vidya Institute of Fashion Technology, Baghpat Road
24	321	Translam Institute of Technology & Management, Mawana Road
25	370	Shanti Institute of Technology, Kurali, Baghpat Road
26	372	KITE Group of Institutions, KITE School of Engineering and Technology
27	373	Neelkanth Institute of Technology, Pawli Khas, Modipuram
28	374	Rishi Institute of Engineering & Technology, Partapur
29	377	Gyan Bharti Institute of Technology, Partapur Bypass Road
30	425	Meerut International Institute of Technology
31	444	Mahaveer Institute of Technology, Sardhana Road
32	487	Panchwati Institute of Engineering & Technology, Delhi- Hardwar Bypass
33	488	Shri Nath Ji Institute for Technical Education, VIll-Ghat, Delhi- Roorkee Bypass
34	496	FIT Engineering College, Kaseru Buxar
35	498	Delhi Institute of Engineering and Technology
36	514	Faculty of Engineering, Shanti Niketan Trust's Group of Institutions, Mohiuddinpur
37	540	Krishna Institute of Management, Bana, Mawana Road
38	544	Kalka Engineering College, Partapur Bypass Road
39	548	Dewan V.S. Institute of Hotel Management & Technology
40	557	Shanti Niketan Trust's Group of Institutions, Faculty of Management, Mohiuddinpur
41	593	Vinayak Vidyapeeth, Pawli khas, Modipuram
42	609	J P School of Business, Salarpur, Jalalpur, Rajpura
43	623	Bharti Institute of Management & Technology, Kila Road, Rali Chauhan
44	644	SVS Group of Institutions
45	682	BIMT College
46	709	Gauri Vidya Peeth Business School
47	711	Vishveshwarya College of Education, Mawana
48	716	Mahaveer Institute of Engineering and Technology
49	732	Rudra Group of Institutions
50	789	Dayanand Vidhyapeeth Education
51	804	APS College of Education & Technology
52	817	AR Institute of Management & Technology
53	821	Mahaveer College of Pharmacy
54	835	LTR Institute of Management
55	903	APS College of Education

=== Mirzapur ===
S.No	Institute Code	Name of College
1	076	Ghanshyam Binani Academy of Management Sciences
2	904	Apex Institute of Pharmacy
3	905	Vindhya Gurukul College of Pharmacy
4	1215	Samrat Ashok Rajkiya Engineering College

=== Moradabad ===
S.No	Institute Code	Name of College
1	082	Moradabad Institute of Technology
2	410	R.S.D. Academy, College of Management & Technology
3	521	Kothiwal Institute of Technology & Professional Studies, Pachokara Haridwar Road
4	549	Radha Govind Institute of Pharmacy, Moradabad-Chandausi Road
5	598	Moradabad Educational Trust (MET) Group of Institutions, Faculty of Pharmacy
6	614	Shree Satya Institute of Management, Lodhipur Rajput, Palbara
7	631	Moradabad Educational Trust (MET) Group of Institutions, Faculty of B. Architecture
8	702	MIT College of Management
9	906	R.K. College of Pharmacy

=== Muzaffarnagar ===
S.No	Institute Code	Name of College
1	1026	Shri Ram College of Pharmacy
2	083	S.D.College of Engineering and Technology
3	084	Bhagwant Institute of Technology
4	085	S.D.College of Management Studies, Bhopa Road
5	136	S.D. College of Pharmacy & Vocational Studies
6	219	Bhagwant Institute of Pharmacy
7	249	Sri Ram College of Management
8	695	Shri Ram Group of Colleges

=== Raebareli ===
S.No	Institute Code	Name of College
1	187	Feroze Gandhi Institute of Engineering & Technology
2	534	Mahaveer Institute of Technology and Management

=== Rampur ===
S.No	Institute Code	Name of College
1	280	Apex Institute of Technology

=== Saharanpur ===
S.No	Institute Code	Name of College
1	299	Doon College of Education
2	502	Dev Bhoomi Groups of Institutions
3	520	Indraprastha Institute of Management & Technology
4	561	Hari College of Management, Gagalheri
5	586	Dev Bhoomi Groups of Institutions, Faculty of Computer Application
6	621	Dev Bhoomi Groups of Institutions, Faculty of Management
7	636	Saharanpur Institute of Advance Studies, Gokelpur
8	698	Dwarikadheesh Research Education & Management School
9	791	Disha Bharti College of Management & Education
10	811	Forth Dimension College of Architecture
11	842	Devrishi Institute of Management & Technology
12	854	Saharanpur Pharmacy College
13	856	Veer Vijay Pharmacy College
14	426	Doon College of Engg. & Technology

=== Shahjahanpur ===
S.No	Institute Code	Name of College
1	582	Sun Institute of Management and Technology
2	583	Lakshya Institute of Management & Information Technology
3	753	Lakshya Technical Campus

=== Sitapur ===
S.No	Institute Code	Name of College
1	134	Sacred Heart Institute of Management & Technology
2	221	Institute of Engineering and Technology
3	258	Institute of Pharmacy

=== Sonbhadra ===
S.No	Institute Code	Name of College
1	841	Rajkiya Engineering College, Sonbhadra

=== Sultanpur ===
S.No	Institute Code	Name of College
1	104	Kamla Nehru Institute of Technology
2	135	Kamla Nehru Institute Of Physical & Social Sciences, Management Institute
3	167	Rajarshi Rananjay Singh College of Pharmacy
4	186	Kamla Nehru Institute of Management & Technology
5	382	Kamla Nehru Institute of Physical & Social Sciences
6	383	Rajarshi Rananjay Singh Institute of Management & Technology

=== Unnao ===
S.No	Institute Code	Name of College
1	262	Institute of Pharmaceutical Sciences & Research
2	427	Mahatma Gandhi Universe Institute
3	446	Institute of Professional Studies & Research (IPSR)
4	527	Sunrise Institute of Engineering Technology & Management
5	640	Dr Virendra Swarup Memorial Trust Group of Institutions
6	714	Kanpur Institute of Management Studies
7	745	Shri Rammurti Smarak College of Engineering & Technology

=== Varanasi ===
S.No	Institute Code	Name of College
1	106	School of Management Sciences
2	107	Institute of Computer Science & Technology
3	108	Rajarshi School of Management and Technology (RSMT)
4	154	Faculty of Management and Technology
5	179	Jeevandeep Institute of Management & Technology
6	205	Institute of Pharmacy
7	248	Society of Advanced Management Studies, Institute of Hotel Management
8	300	Saraswati Higher Education & Technical College of Pharmacy
9	384	Saraswati Higher Education & Technical College of Engineering
10	393	College of Pharmacy
11	428	Kashi Institute of Technology
12	551	Kashi Institute of Pharmacy
13	641	Ashoka Institute of Technology & Management
14	747	Raj School of Management & Sciences

== See also ==
- Education in Uttar Pradesh
- List of institutions of higher education in Uttar Pradesh
