= Faculty of Commerce, Banaras Hindu University =

Faculty in Banaras Hindu University

- Type: Faculty
- Established: 1940
- Parent institution: Banaras Hindu University
- Affiliations: UGC
- Dean: Professor H. K. Singh
- Location: Varanasi, Uttar Pradesh, India; 25°16′08″N 82°59′28″E
- Campus: Urban
- Website: Faculty of Commerce

Faculty of Commerce, Banaras Hindu University (FOC-BHU), also known as Shri Thakur Ratan Pal Singh Faculty of Commerce is a faculty in the Banaras Hindu University, Varanasi, India which offers undergraduate, postgraduate and doctorate courses in Commerce. It was founded in 1940.

== History ==
The faculty of Commerce was started in 1940 as an adjunct to the Department of Economics and attained independent department status soon after. In 1965, the Department of Commerce was accorded status of a faculty.

It is the only faculty in entire Banaras Hindu University which is named after an individual.

=== Key timelines ===
- 1940: Started as adjunct to the Department of Economics; attained independent department status soon after.
- 1965: Department of Commerce was accorded status of a faculty and renamed Faculty of Commerce.
- 1968: Introduced Management courses as a separate discipline of study.
- 1975: Renamed as the Faculty of Commerce and Management Studies.
- 1984: Two separate faculties (Faculty of Commerce & Faculty of Management Studies) had been created from existing faculty.
- 1984: Started offering B.Com. (honours), M.Com (honours) and Ph.D degrees.
- 2015: Faculty of commerce started offering the degree of M.B.A. in Financial Management, Financial Management (Risk and Insurance) and Master of Foreign Trade.

== See also ==
- Banaras Hindu University
- List of educational institutions in Varanasi
