= Prabhu Narayan Government Inter College =

Prabhu Narayan Government Inter College (PNGIC)

Location
- Ramnagar; India, Uttar Pradesh, 221008; India
- Coordinates: 25.275802°N 83.0276402°E

Information
- School type: Intermediate College Government
- Religious affiliation: All Society
- Established: 13 January 1913
- Founder: Sir James Meston
- School district: Varanasi
- Principal: Dr. Prabhas kumar Jha
- Teaching staff: 30+ teaching staff
- Gender: Male
- Classes offered: 6 to 12th
- Language: Hindi, Urdu and English
- Hours in school day: 6
- Classrooms: 50+
- Campus size: Near about 7 acres
- Campus type: Rectangular
- Yearbook: Nav Jyoti

Prabhu Narayan Government Inter College is one of the oldest college of Ramnagar and also of Varanasi. This institution has two floored laboratory of physics and chemistry and has one of the largest playgrounds in Ramnagar, where different colleges play many types of tournament.

== History ==
It was established on 13 January 1913 by Sir James Meston as Meston High School. Prabhu Narayan Singh was instrumental in setting up the school and donated requisite land for the school. A science laboratory was built in 1978 for proper education of the students. This college is also known as PN College. The hostel was arranged for the students coming from far away but later it was closed after it was not needed. In 1953, the first edition of Nav Jyoti magazine was published in the college. This college is famous for its heritage buildings. The red color of this school makes it stand out. There is a well in the middle of a field and an old ficus tree. There is a stage for cultural programs known as "Krishna Rang Manch". That stage was made by the then present principal in 1988. It became a government college after the independent India and has named Prabhu Narayan on the name of King of Ramnagar.

There is another stage which was built in 2000. For the first time, in 2000, then-Chief Minister Ram Prakash Gupta addressed the rally of the "Kisan Morcha". At that time the present central minister Rajnath Singh and former chief secretary of the state Om Prakash Singh were also present. After 17 years on 22 November 2017, chief minister of the province Yogi Adityanath addressed the people of Ramnagar from this stage.

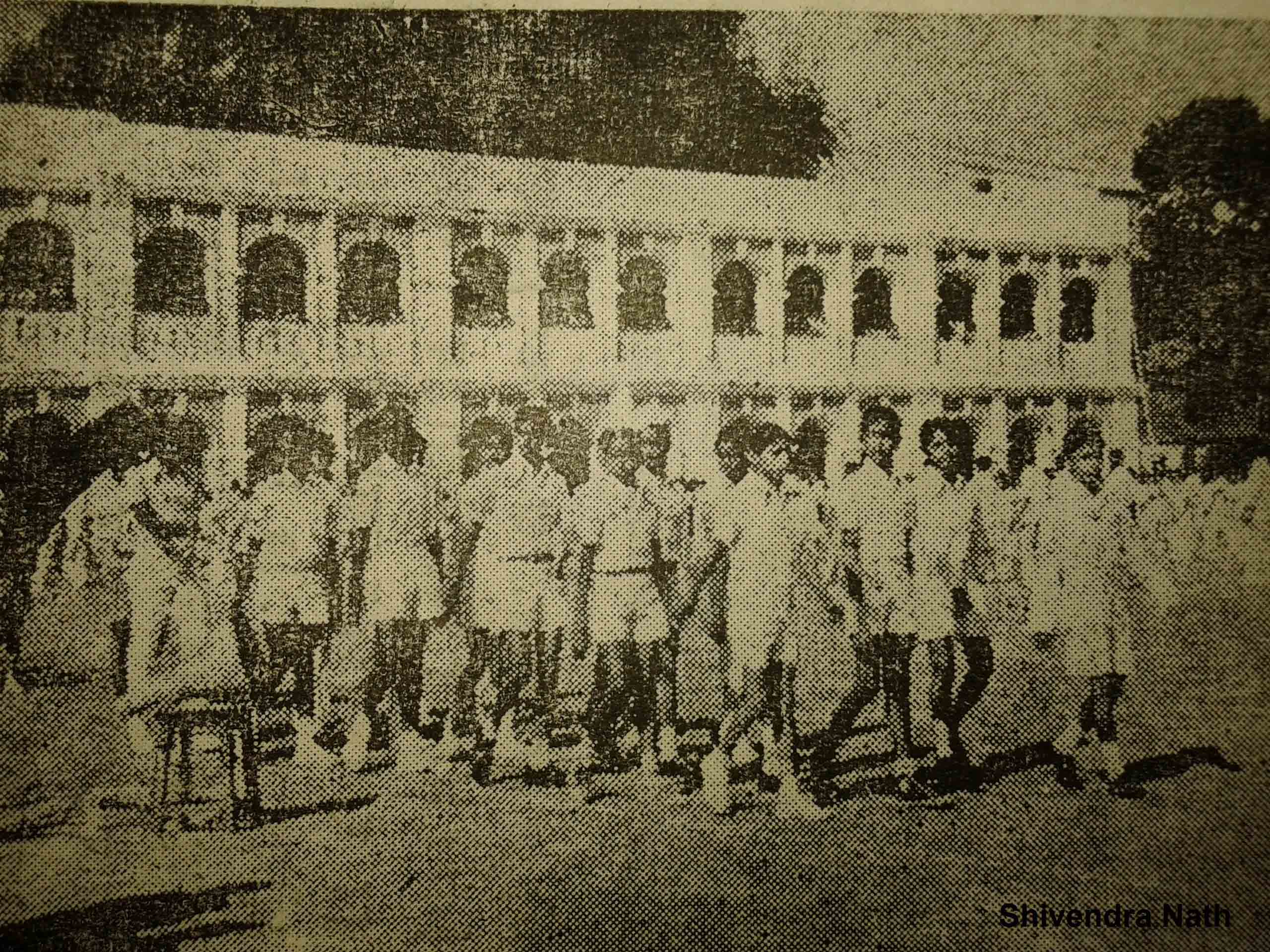
Team of college participating in the Team March Post of Junior Redcross Regional Parade, 1976 from Nav Jyoti magazine

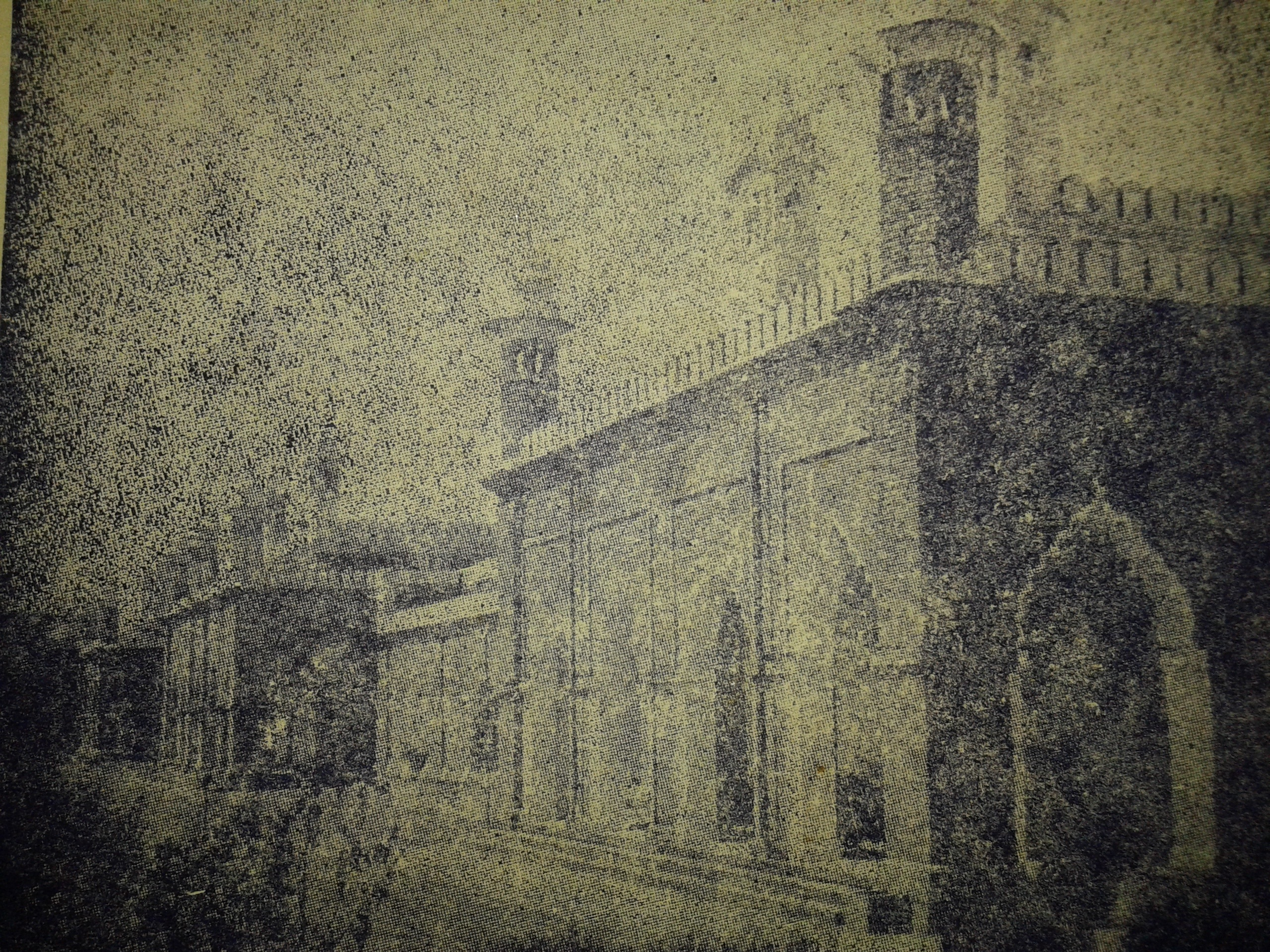
40 years ago scene of College

== Campus ==
It owns a large Hall which is one of the largest hall where many types of programs is held such as quiz competition, cultural programs, debates competition and several types of other programs. Playground of college is large for playing district level sports. In 2016, on the World Population Day, Uttar Pradesh Chief Minister Akhilesh Yadav initiated a campaign to make UP a green state. Calling it "UP Goes Green", Akhilesh aims to plant 5 crore saplings within a span of 24 hours. The saplings were also planted in the 2 hectare area of college for being a part of "UP Goes Green Campaign". More than 2,000 plants were planted in the field, college and students also contributed to planting the plants.

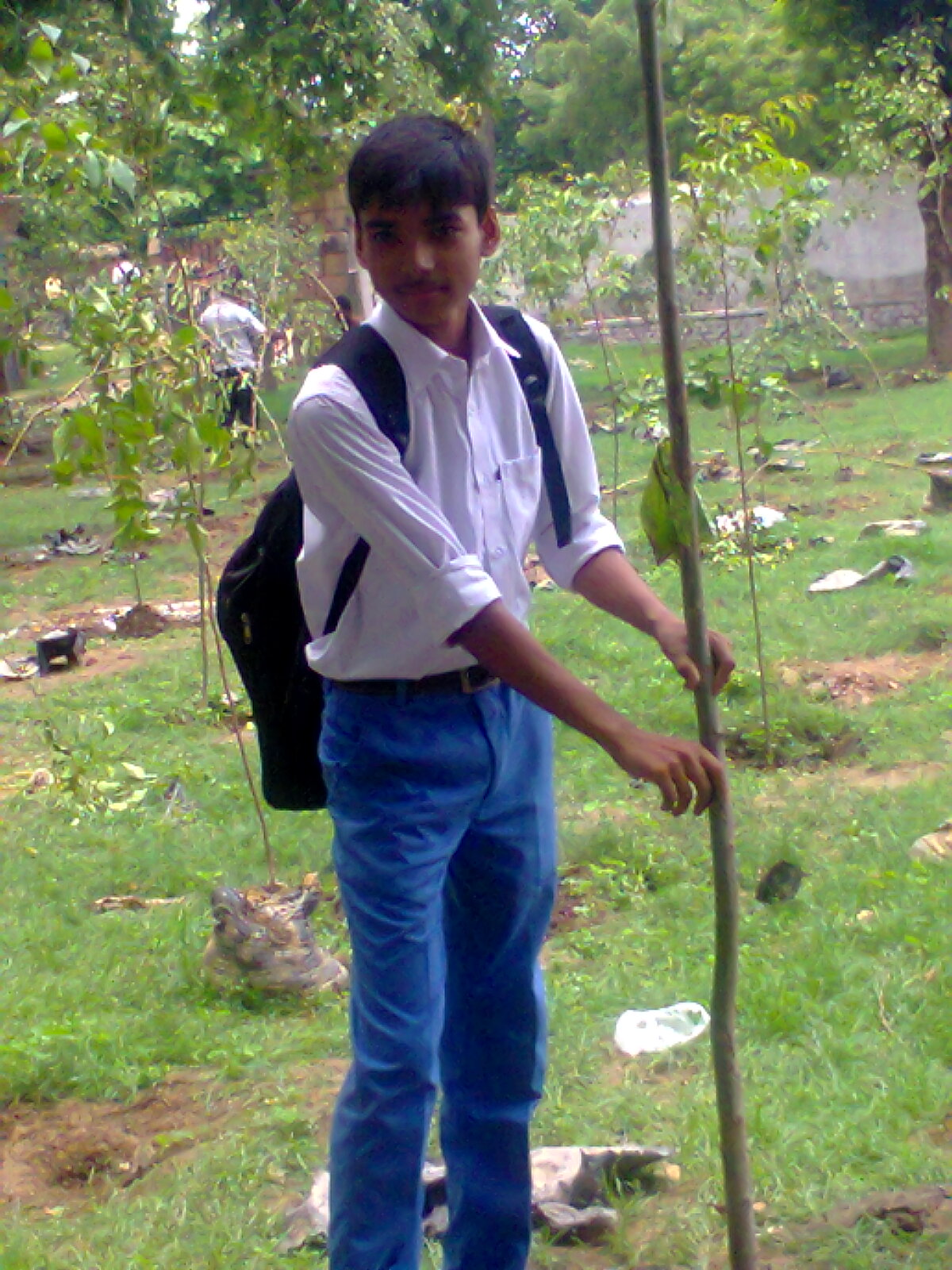
A student contributed in UP Goes Green Campaign, 11 July 2016

== See also ==
- List of educational institutions in Varanasi
