= DAV Post Graduate College =

College in Uttar Pradesh, India

- Motto: धीयो यो न: प्रचोदयात्
- Type: Public college
- Established: 1 May 1938; 88 years ago
- Parent institution: Banaras Hindu University Varanasi
- Superintendent: Ajeet Singh
- Principal: Satya Dev Singh
- Location: Maharshi Dayanand Marg, Narharpura, Ausanganj, Varanasi, Uttar Pradesh, 221001, India; 25.3228°N 83.0091°E
- Campus: Urban
- Website: www.davpgcvns.ac.in

DAV Post Graduate College, also known as DAV Degree College, is a college in Ausanganj, Varanasi, Uttar Pradesh, India, admitted to the privileges of Banaras Hindu University and recognised by University Grants Commission. The college was awarded the A+ Grade by NAAC in 2023. It is one of the top colleges in India with A+ rating by NAAC. It was established in 1938 by Pandit Ram Narayan Mishra and Shri Gauri Shankar Prasad.

== History ==
DAV Post Graduate College started in 1938 as an Intermediate college. From 1938 to 1947, DAV was recognised by Banaras Hindu University. In 1947, BHU accorded degree status to DAV PG College and in 1954 a permanent affiliation was accorded to DAV PG College. In the same year DAV commenced undergraduate courses in arts, social sciences and commerce. In 2008, after permission from BHU, the DAV college introduced postgraduate degrees in select subjects and also PhD course. The college is the only one in Uttar Pradesh with an A+ rating by NAAC.

== See also ==
- List of educational institutions in Varanasi
