= Uttar Pradesh Forestry & Horticulture University =

University in Uttar Pradesh, India

- Type: State
- Established: Upcoming
- Location: Gorakhpur, Uttar Pradesh, India

Uttar Pradesh Forestry & Horticulture University is an upcoming university in Gorakhpur, Uttar Pradesh, India. It will be North India's first forestry university and India's second.

The university will be built in a 50-hectare area in Campierganj, Gorakhpur, out of which 44 hectare will be green cover. INR 621 Cr has been allocated for construction. The university will offer degree and diploma courses tailored to forest department needs.

== History ==
Chief Minister Yogi Adityanath announced the establishment of the state’s first forestry university in Gorakhpur on September 6, 2024, during the inauguration of the Jatayu Conservation and Breeding Centre in the Campierganj area.

The state cabinet approved the draft ordinance on April 7, 2026.Subsequently, a government order granting approval was issued on April 22, 2026. In the same sequence, the Uttar Pradesh Forestry and Horticulture University Act, 2026, was promulgated on August 17, 2026.

== See also ==
- Forest College and Research Institute, Hyderabad
- Forest Research Institute (India)
