= Udai Pratap Autonomous College =

College in Varanasi, India

Udai Pratap Autonomous College (UP College) is a college in Varanasi, India. It was established in 1909. Its campus is about 100 acres, and it has about 17,000 students.

In 2004, the National Assessment and Accreditation Council evaluated UP College as A grade.

== Land dispute ==
A November 2024 land survey of the nearby city Sambhal was a rallying point for protests and violence related to the identification of the site of a mosque. That event renewed previous protests against UP College, as a centuries-old mosque is in the college campus.

Uttar Pradesh Central Sunni Waqf Board made a public statement to the college in 2018 that the entire college campus is on waqf property.
