= Virendra Pratap Shahi =

Indian gangster (1947–1997)

Member of Uttar Pradesh Legislative Assembly
- In office June 1981 – November 1989
- Preceded by: Abdul Rauf Lari
- Succeeded by: Amarmani Tripathi
- Constituency: Lakshmipur

Personal details
- Born: 15 August 1947 Gorakhpur, Uttar Pradesh, India
- Died: 31 March 1997 (aged 49) Lucknow, Uttar Pradesh, India
- Cause of death: Assassination by gunshot
- Party: Independent
- Other political affiliations: Rashtriya Sanjay Manch; Janata Dal; Samajwadi Party
- Spouse: Girjesh Shahi (m.1978)
- Children: 2 sons Shakti Shahi Vivek Shahi (Both deceased); 2 daughters Deepti Shahi & Preeti Shahi (Married) Gulsan Singh (Deceased), the elder brother-in-law of Virendra Shahi, had two sons, Varun Pratap Singh and Vaibhav Pratap Singh,
- Occupation: Politician
- Known for: Involvement in the gang war with Hari Shankar Tiwari, Served as a Member of 8th Vidhan Sabha and 9th Vidhan Sabha of Uttar Pradesh

Virendra Pratap Shahi (15 August 1947 – 31 March 1997) was an Indian gangster and crimnal turned politician from Uttar Pradesh who served as a Member of the Legislative Assembly (MLA) from the Lakshmipur constituency in Maharajganj district. He served as the Member of the Legislative Assembly for the Lakshmipur Assembly constituency of Uttar Pradesh.

== Career ==
Shahi entered active politics in 1981 after winning a by-election from the Lakshmipur Assembly constituency as an independent candidate. He went on to serve as an MLA from June 1981 to March 1985 and again from March 1985 to November 1989.

He was regarded as an influential political figure in the Purvanchal region, known for his strong grassroots connect and organizational capabilities. During his political career, he developed a significant support base and played an active role in regional politics.

Shahi was initially associated with the Rashtriya Sanjay Manch and later joined the Janata Dal, reflecting his evolving political affiliations over time. known for his involvement in the gang war between him and Hari Shankar Tiwari, another gangster-turned-politician. The two warlords were involved in approximately 50 murders, and their gang war became a folklore in the Purvanchal region, earning it the sobriquet of Chicago of the East and Slice of Sicily. He was shot dead in 1997 by a gangster Shri Prakash Shukla.

He was known for his manipulative skills and his ability to win government contracts and influence people. In 1981, he contested the assembly (by-poll) elected from the Lakshmipur assembly constituency of Maharajganj district as an independent candidate and won the election against Amarmani Tripathi, a close aide of Hari Shankar Tiwari.

The gang war between Shahi and Tiwari originated before the Emergency period. Tiwari was involved in student politics, while Shahi maintained close ties with Ram Kinkar Singh, a former MLA of Basti. He was living in Basti.

== Death ==
On 31 March 1997, Shahi was shot dead in Lucknow by Shri Prakash Shukla, a rising gangster seeking to establish dominance in the underworld. Following his death, clashes between Shahi’s associates and rival groups led to further violence and killings, during which his elder brother-in-law, Gulsan Singh, was also killed. .

Virendra Pratap Shahi had over 63 pending criminal charges, including several for murder. Initially, he was a member of the Rashtriya Sanjay Manch before later joining the Janata Dal.
