= Suhaib Ilyasi =

Indian television producer and director (born 1966)

- Born: 8 September 1966 (age 60); New Delhi, India
- Education: Jamia Millia Islamia
- Occupations: TV Host, Producer, Director
- Known for: India's Most Wanted
- Spouse(s): Anju Ilyasi (1993-2000); Sahebzadi Sumaya Khan (2006-present)

Suhaib Ilyasi (born 8 September 1966) is an Indian television producer and director. He was the host of the notable TV crime show India's Most Wanted. He was the editor of the news magazine Bureaucracy Today. After his wife died in 2000, Ilyasi was charged under Section 304B of the Indian Penal Code for dowry death. He also got involved in a legal battle with his in-laws for the custody of his daughter. Ilyasi was acquitted in the case, while the charges 498A and 304B were also not proven and Ilyasi was discharged for the aforesaid charges in the trial court. Later, he was charged with murdering his wife 14 years after the incident. On 20 December 2017, he was convicted for the murder and sentenced to life imprisonment. On 5 October 2018, Delhi High Court acquitted him, stating that there was no evidence against him on record to sustain the conviction.

== Life ==
=== Marriage ===
Ilyasi met Anju at Jamia Millia Islamia, a university in Delhi, where both were studying at the Mass Communication Research Centre, in November 1989. Anju's father was K. P. Singh, then head of metallurgy department.

Both families were opposed to the relationship, however they got married in London in 1993 under the Special Marriage Act. They lived in London until October 1994. Upon returning to India, Anju used to live in Ilyasi's house and returned to London after 6 months to her brother. Her brother, Prashant, who was working in London at the time, later said that Anju was considering divorce at the time, but he convinced her to stay in the marriage. In April 1994, Ilyasi came to London, the couple reconciled and they returned to India after a month. The next year their daughter Aaliya was born.

During their stay in London, they had arrived at the idea of a television show similar to the British show Crimestoppers, which they named India's Most Wanted. Initially, Anju was the anchor in the television pilots, but by the time the show went on air on Zee TV in March 1998, Ilyasi had become the anchor. Around this, Anju left again and went to her sister in Canada. India's Most Wanted was initially planned for 52 episodes but it was renewed by Zee TV. Later, Ilyasi moved the show to Doordarshan under the name Fugitive Most Wanted. Zee TV which owned the copyright continued to produce India's Most Wanted and Manoj Raghuvanshi became the host. Ilyasi went to Canada in October 1998 to persuade her to return. IIyasi converted his software firm Aaliya Productions, into a private limited company and put 25% shares in Anju's name.

Anju returned in February 1999. They bought a new apartment at the same time in Mayur Vihar, in east Delhi, for ₹1,500,000 and spent 10 months redecorating. They moved into the house in December 1999. They planned to celebrate Anju's 30th birthday on 16 January with a grand party.

=== Court case & Acquittal ===
On 10 January 2000, Ilyasi called two police constables who were guarding his house at 11:15pm, and told them that his wife had stabbed herself and asked them to call an ambulance. The policemen were there because Ilyasi had claimed that he was getting death threats from the underworld due to his show. Anju was taken to a nearby nursing home and later to the AIIMS, New Delhi, where she was declared dead on arrival. Anju Ilyasi had died from excessive internal bleeding, which were described as self-inflicted in the initial forensic report, ruling out murder. The Central Forensic Science Laboratory report said that six fingerprint characters were found but 13 were required to match it to a person. Both the stab wounds were downwards and backwards, left to right on the accessible parts of the abdomen. The T-shirt she was wearing was not torn as it was sweater like shirt. Ilyasi claimed that they were having an argument recently. He was playing with his daughter in another room, when Anju picked up an imported butcher's knife and stabbed herself. Anju's mother was in Canada at the time of death. Anju had visited her father hours before her death. Ilyasi moved into his in-laws' residence ostensibly to help them to cope with their grief. On 17 January, police filed the case as suicide. Ilyasi was finally acquitted by Delhi High Court.

=== The Charge ===
On 15 February 2000, his wife's sister, Rashmi Singh, who ran a Montessori school, arrived from Ottawa, Ontario, Canada. After month, Rashmi filed a police complaint saying that Anju was tortured for dowry and that she was driven to suicide. On 28 March, Ilyasi was arrested and charged with dowry death (Section 304B of the Indian Penal Code), mental harassment (Section 498A) and destroying evidence (Section 201). On 30 March, the show's scheduled episode did appear on the Doordarshan channel. Following the arrest, Rashmi and her mother Rukma quarreled with their family and moved into a relative's house. Rashmi claimed that Anju had an unhappy marriage for 7 years. She had in 1997 during a visit she saw Ilyasi assault Anju. She said that the apartment in which they were living was purchased with money provided by her. which was proved wrong during the trial. She also said that she had purchased the apartment for Anju's safety, but later retracted the statement.

=== Trial and custody battle ===
On 14 April, Rashmi Singh gave an undertaking to the Delhi High Court that she won't take the child Aaliya without the court's permission. The court also asked her not take the child outside Delhi. The petition had filed by Ilyasi's parents that Rashmi might take the child to Canada. Then, Aaliya was two-and-a-half years old. On 2 June 2000, Ilyasi was granted bail by the Delhi High Court on a personal bail bond of ₹200,000 and two sureties of the same amount. He was asked to submit his passport, not moved out of Delhi without permission, and not threaten the witness or tamper with evidence.

On 11 July 2000, the Delhi High Court said that Rashmi and Rukma cannot take the custody of the child by force. The court said they may take a legal path to gain custody. Aaliya had been living with her father since 2 July. Ilyasi had complained that Rashmi had been trying to take away the child to Canada. He said that they had told him that they would charge him with threatening witnesses, if he did not give up custody.

On 29 May 2001, the Delhi High Court allowed Ilyasi to travel outside Delhi. He had sought permission to go to Mumbai for work. The court said he may do so after informing the police of his plans two days in advance. In 2005, Rukma Singh appeal to a session court that a Central Bureau of Investigation (CBI) probe be started on the case. The court in August 2005 rejected the plea saying the plea filed after 5 years had no sufficient reason and was aimed at delaying the trial.

In August 2010, Rukma's counsel told the court that additional murder charges (Section 302 of Indian Penal Code) should be added to the case. Her claims were supported by the prosecution. Sharma said the doctor who carried out the post mortem did not deny the possibility of homicide. Sharma also told the court that even though Ilyasi claimed to snatch the knife away from Anju, neither his nor Anju's fingerprints were found on the knife. Ilyasi argued that the doctor cannot be relied upon because he was later transferred from the mortuary department after allegation of unprofessional work. The sessions court rejected the plea for additional murder charges in February 2011 after finding no new material in the case. In an interview in 2012, Ilyasi said that the murder charges were being sought to take custody of his daughter, then 15. He said that he had not taken dowry as it was a love marriage and he had paid for the expenses. In another interview, he said that the Indian dowry laws were biased against men.

In January 2013, the Delhi High Court stopped the proceedings of medical board. The police had formed a new medical board, as the previous board was split on its opinion whether it was murder. Ilyasi's counsel told them that the police had formed the new board without permission from the trial court, thus it was contempt of court. In March 2013, the Delhi High Court stayed the proceedings. The case was tried at a session court under section 498A/304B/302 IPC at Karkadooma District Court, New Delhi. Ilyasi was finally acquitted of all charges on 6 October 2015.

On 20 December 2017, Ilyasi was convicted of murdering his wife by a Delhi court, which sentenced him to life imprisonment. On 5 October 2018, Delhi High Court acquitted him, stating that there was no evidence against him on record to sustain the conviction.

== Career ==
In 1991, Ilyasi went to London to work as a cameraman for TV Asia. In 1995, he made the pilot for a crime show, with his wife. Initially, most channels were reluctant to take the show until Zee TV picked it. Ilyasi started the TV show India's Most Wanted in March 1998 on Zee TV. India's Most Wanted was initially planned for 52 episodes but it was renewed by Zee TV. The show at its peak had reportedly 10–12 TRP. About 135 criminals featured on the show were caught. Shri Prakash Shukla, a wanted hitman featured on the show, was killed by police. The police later said that Ilyasi took credit unduly and the police had worked for months on the case. Following the success of his show, Ilyasi said that he was getting threats and requested police security. In 1999, he played himself in the film Phir Bhi Dil Hai Hindustani. Later, he parted ways with his partner Vinod Nayar and went to start Fugitive Most Wanted on Doordarshan. Zee TV, which owned the copyright, continued to produce India's Most Wanted and Manoj Raghuvanshi became the host. After his wife's death, in 2003 he tried to make a film on Shri Prakash Shukla called Wanted No. 1 where he was supposed to play the lead character. But, the film failed to take off. He produced, directed and acted in another film, Kamyab Rasta (2004) called, co-starring Poonam Dariyanani. He then went to work with India TV, where he conducted several sting operations. Soon, he restarted India's Most Wanted on India TV. In 2005, actors Shakti Kapoor and Aman Verma were the targets of some of these sting operations. In July 2005, he announced plans to make a film on the misuse of dowry laws.

In March 2009, he started a magazine called Bureaucracy Today. He is also the editor-in-chief. In 2012, Yeh Zindagi Hai Gulshan, a TV serial produced by Ilyasi, was broadcast by Doordarshan. Suhaib Ilyasi recently released his feature film ‘Shaadi, Dahej & Gangster’ on OTT. The film is based on the subject of misuse of Dowry laws (Section 498A of IPC) in India.
