= Amarmani Tripathi =

Indian politician

Minister of State Government of Uttar Pradesh
- In office 2002–2003
- Chief Minister: Mayawati
- Ministry & Department's: Printing; Stationery
- In office 1997–2001
- Chief Minister: Kalyan Singh; Ram Prakash Gupta; Rajnath Singh
- Ministry & Department's: Youth Welfare; Institutional Finance

Member of Uttar Pradesh Legislative Assembly
- In office 1996–2012
- Preceded by: Kunwar Akhilesh Singh
- Succeeded by: constituency abolished
- In office 1989–1991
- Preceded by: Virendra Pratap Shahi
- Succeeded by: Kunwar Akhilesh Singh
- Constituency: Lakshmipur

Personal details
- Born: February 14, 1956 (age 70)
- Party: Independent
- Other political affiliations: Indian National Congress; Bahujan Samaj Party Samajwadi Party
- Spouse: Madhumani Tripathi
- Children: Aman Mani Tripathi
- Profession: Politician

Amarmani Tripathi (born 14 February 1956) is a politician from Eastern Uttar Pradesh. He was an MLA from Lakshmipur, Uttar Pradesh four times. He and his wife were released by UP Government in the Madhumita Shukla murder case in which he conspired to murder. He had earlier been a state Minister in the state of Uttar Pradesh.

Tripathi was arrested in September 2003 in connection with the murder of poet Madhumita Shukla, with whom he allegedly had an affair, and was murdered on 9 May 2003. The post-mortem report of Madhumita revealed that she was carrying a foetus that matched the DNA of Amarmani, and he and his wife, Madhumani Tripathi, were sentenced to life imprisonment in October 2007.

== Personal life ==
Amarmani Tripathi was born on 14 February 1956. He married Madhumani Tripathi. He is also the father of Aman Mani Tripathi who is also MLA of Nautanwa Vidhan Sabha Constituency. His son Aman contested from Nautanwa Vidhan Sabha in 2012 on Samajwadi Party ticket but lost by a close margin.

== Political career ==
Tripathi was an associate of Hari Shankar Tiwari, a long-time MLA from the Indian National Congress.

After entering politics, Tripathi was instrumental in several large shifts of allegiance involving dozens of MPs, thus influencing the formation of several governments in Uttar Pradesh. He was a member of the Indian National Congress, Bahujan Samaj Party, and the Bharatiya Janata Party. He was Minister of State for Institutional Finance in the Rajnath Singh-led BJP government in 2001, but was dismissed in December that year, after the kidnappers of Rahul Madesia, the 15-year-old son of a businessman in Basti in eastern Uttar Pradesh, told the police that Tripathi had provided them with the bungalow in Lucknow from where they were arrested.

He unsuccessfully contested from Lakshmipur Vidhan Sabha of Uttar Pradesh in 1980 but lost to Virendra Pratap Shahi who was also associated with the state underworld and was a big name in U.P.'s politics at that time. Shahi again became MLA in 1985 but finally Amarmani became successful in becoming MLA in 1989 from Indian National Congress. In 1991, that is, the next election he lost to Akhilesh Singh, another tainted leader but was re-elected from Lakshmipur in the next 1996 elections from Indian National Congress. Tripathi again won election in 2002 on the ticket of Bahujan Samaj Party and became minister in the state government.

== Madhumita Shukla murder ==
On 9 May 2003, Madhumita Shukla, a 24-year-old budding poet and allegedly the lover of Amarmani, was gunned down at close range by two visitors in her two-room apartment in Lucknow's Paper Mill Colony. She was seven months pregnant at the time.

The investigation of the case was taken up by the SHO of PS Mahanagar, Lucknow Mr. Ajay Kumar Chaturvedi. He collected all relevant information as a diary of the deceased, provided shelter to a lone witness a servant, and took the investigation into the house of Amarmani Tripathi. Later for not towing the government's line, the government transferred the investigation to CB CID.

In June 2003, the chief investigator in the case, Mahendra Lalka (IPS 1967), was suspended, by the State Government and then reinstated within 45 days as the government realized that Mr. Lalka was right and also Mr. Lalka was backed by the IAS and IPS lobby both from the state and center. A senior Indian Police Service officer claimed that Mayawati had ordered the suspension of state CID Director General Mahendra Lalka simply because he refused to give Tripathi a clean chit. The case was subsequently transferred to the Central Bureau of Investigation, and Amarmani was arrested in September 2003. Phone calls relating to the murder were traced to Tripathi's wife Madhumani in Gorakhpur, who was also subsequently convicted of the murder.

Various attempts at getting bail were turned down, especially based on the DNA evidence of a relationship which he had initially denied. Amarmani and his wife were lodged in Gorakhpur jail, where they were found to be holding rock concerts.

While still in jail, Tripathi won in the U.P. Assembly Elections, 2007 as an Independent candidate. He won the Lakshmipur Constituency seat in Mahrajganj District, defeating the nearest rival Kaushal Kishore of the Rashtriya Janata Dal by a margin of nearly 20 thousand votes (12%).

In March 2007, the case was transferred to a special court in Dehradun, where Tripathi and his wife along with three others were convicted of the murder of Madhumita Shukla on 24 October 2007. The court has sentenced Amarmani, his wife Madhumani, and two other accused to life imprisonment.

In 2012, Amarmani's son Amanmani Tripathi was given a ticket by Samajwadi Party for contesting the 2012 Uttar Pradesh assembly elections. Amarmani managed to record a video from jail to send out a message to the constituency of Nautanwa (merged with Lakshmipur after delimitation). Despite a wave in favor of SP, Amanmani lost to Kaushal Kishore of Indian National Congress by a margin of 4%.

The son of murder convict Amarmani and his murder convict wife, Amanmani was also charge-sheeted by CBI in February 2017 for murdering his wife by strangulation.
