= Mahatma Gandhi Inter College, Gorakhpur =

- Gorakhpur, Uttar Pradesh; India

Information
- Motto: तमसो माँ ज्योतिर्गमय (Lead me from darkness into light)
- Established: 1910 (registered 1913)
- School board: Uttar Pradesh Madhyamik Shiksha Parishad (U.P.Board)
- Website: mgicgkp.edu.in

Mahatma Gandhi Inter College, is a U.P. board affiliate college in Gorakhpur, Uttar Pradesh, India, which provides education in Hindi and English mediums with all three Streams.

== History ==
Mahatma Gandhi Intermediate College, then the Gorakhpur High School, preceded by Gorakhpur High School Society, was founded on 6 January 1909. One of the renowned Gorakhpur citizen, Late Rai Bahadur Ram Garib Lalji came forward and donated his 11 acres of land for school premises. In 1913, the School Society was registered and in 1913 J. Hope Simpson the then District Magistrate put the first foundation brick of the main building of the School. In the construction of the main building Late Ishwari Prasad ji made a significant donation. Consequently, the main building was named Ishwari Manzil. The founder principal of this college was Mr Jadunath Chakrabarty.

In 1948, after assassination of Mahatma Gandhi, the school society passed a resolution and as a result there of, The Gorakhpur High School and the Gorakhpur Society were respectively replaced by the Mahatma Gandhi Intermediate College and the National Educational Society, Gorakhpur.

== Administration ==
The school is under the administration of National Educational Society, Gorakhpur.

== Students and faculty ==
The students strength of the school is 18000. Total number of teachers are 66. There are 72 classrooms in college.

Some of old students of this college are serving this college as a teacher, when they are selected as teacher by Madhya Shiksha Seva Chayan Board, Allahabad. Some of these teachers are Ram Nath Verma (Lecturer-Physics, 2002), Shashi Bhushan Srivastava (Lecturer-Physics, 2003), M.M.Gupta (Lecturer-Biology) etc.
