= Institute of Technology & Management, Gorakhpur =

Private engineering college in Gorakhpur, Uttar Pradesh, India

Institute of Technology & Management
- Motto: सह वीर्यं करवावहै
- Motto in English: May we work together with great energy and vigor
- Type: Private
- Established: 2001 (25 years ago)
- Affiliations: Dr. A. P. J. Abdul Kalam Technical University, Lucknow
- Director: Dr. N. K. Singh
- Academic staff: 70
- Students: 1253
- Undergraduates: 1253
- Location: Gorakhpur, Uttar Pradesh, 273209, India; 26.74296°N 83.27327°E
- Campus: 16 acres; Rural
- Website: itmgkp.edu.in

Institute of Technology & Management, Gorakhpur is private engineering college established in 2001 at Gorakhpur-Lucknow Highway around 12 km from Gorakhpur city.

== History ==
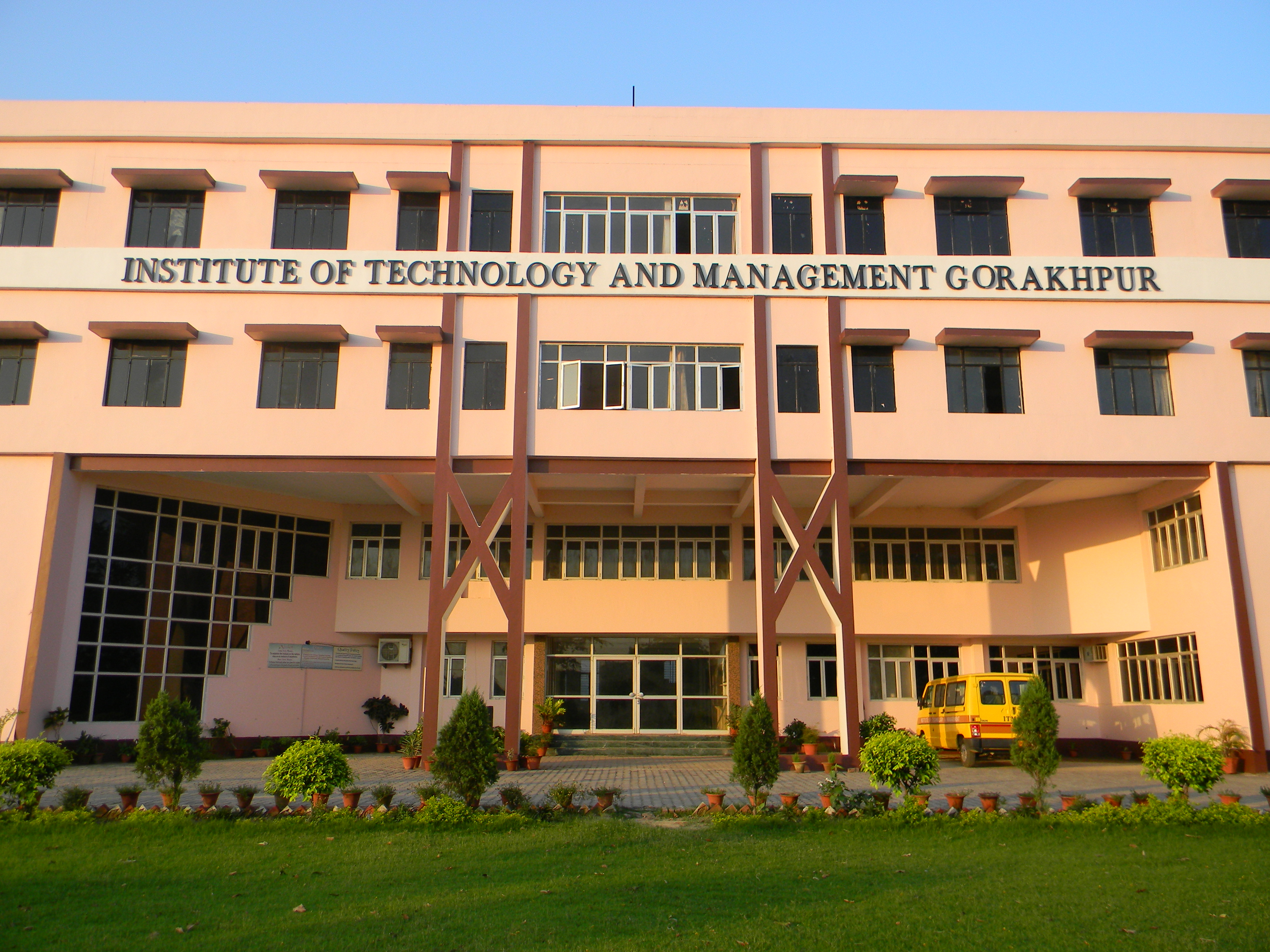
Main building of the institute in 2011

== Academics ==
Discipline	Department
Computer Application	Computer Application
Engineering	Computer Science & Engineering
Engineering	Computer Science & Engineering (AI & ML)
Engineering	Computer Science & Engineering (Data Science)
Engineering	Electronics & Communication Engineering
Engineering	Mechanical Engineering
Engineering	Civil Engineering
Pharmacy	Pharmacy
Management	Business Administration
Law	Law
Journalism	Journalism & Mass Communication
Applied Science	Mathematics, Physics, Chemistry, Biology, and Languages

== See also ==
- Madan Mohan Malaviya University of Technology
- Dr. A. P. J. Abdul Kalam Technical University, Lucknow
