= India's Most Wanted (TV series) =

- Created by: Aaliya Productions
- Directed by: Suhaib Ilyasi
- Country of origin: India
- No. of seasons: 2
- No. of episodes: Total 65

Production
- Running time: approx. 52 minutes

Original release
- Network: Zee TV
- Release: 1998 – 2005

India's Most Wanted (IMW) was a crime busting fugitive hunter television show initially on Zee TV and later on DD1, India's national broadcaster Doordarshan. The show was made famous by its Anchor-Director and Producer, Suhaib Ilyasi with his unique presentation style and criminals actually being caught with the help of television.

The show is considered to be the first and the biggest crime show on television in India. This program has shown live telecasts and helped police with 135 fugitives.

Ilyasi later launched the show with India TV in 2005. The show did not do well as it did originally on Zee TV and DD1. Media watchers blame Ilyasi for choosing a new TV channel (India TV) to relaunch the show.

== See also ==
- Crime Patrol
- Savdhaan India
