= Gorakhpur =

City in Uttar Pradesh, India

Gorakhpur Gorakshapuram
- Metropolis
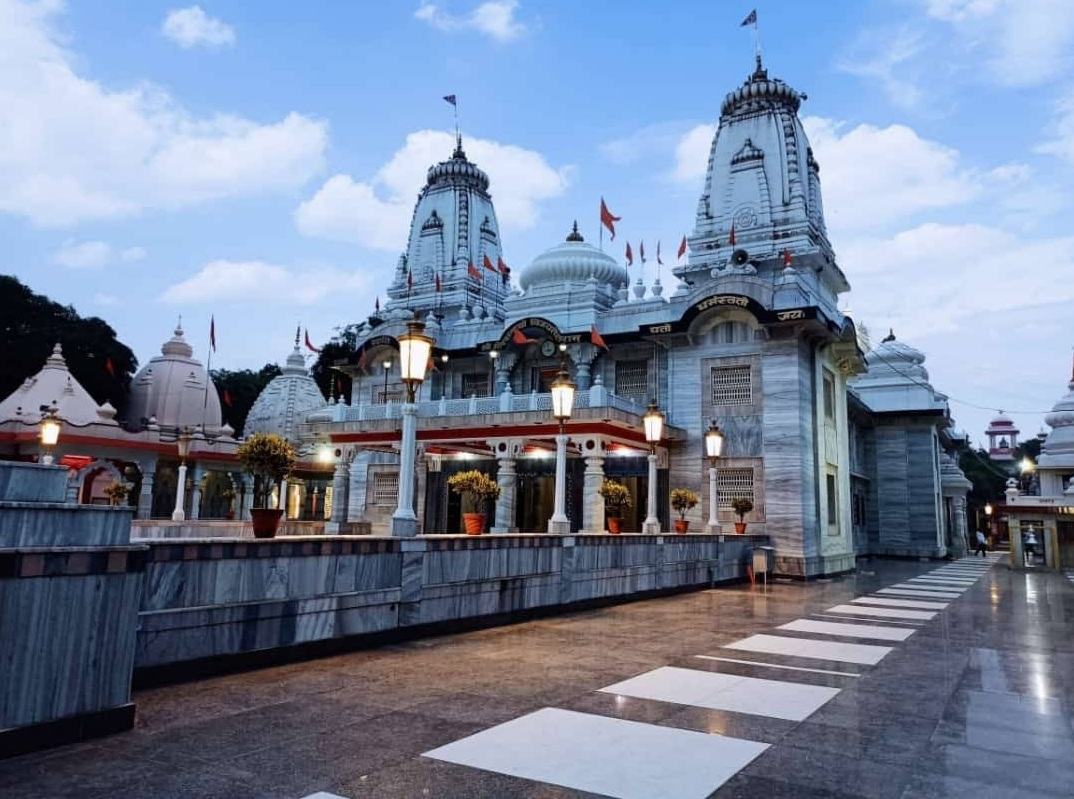
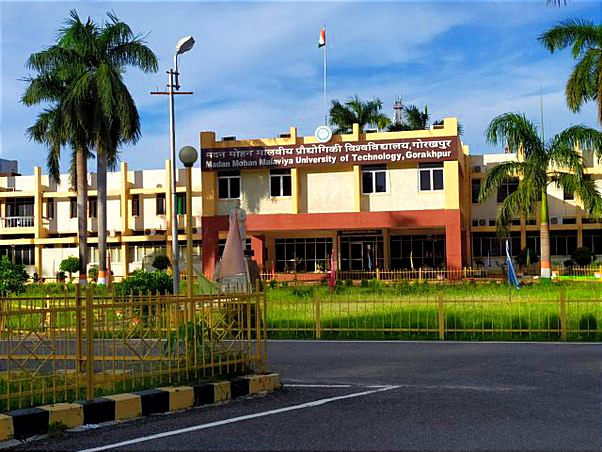
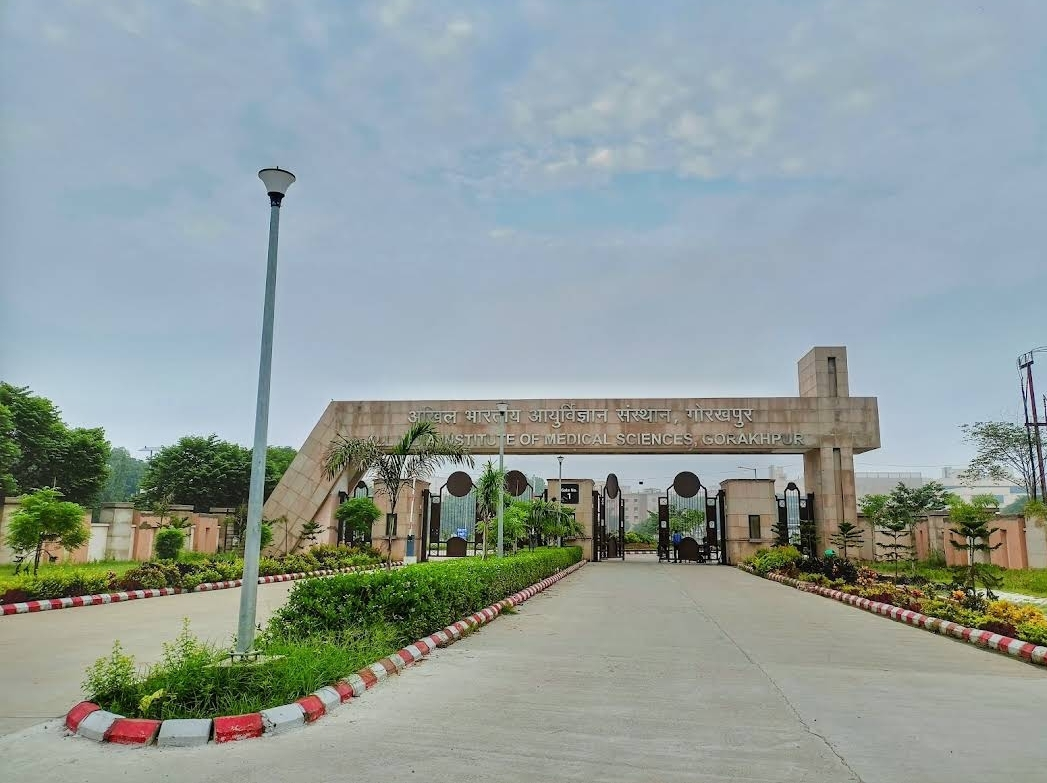
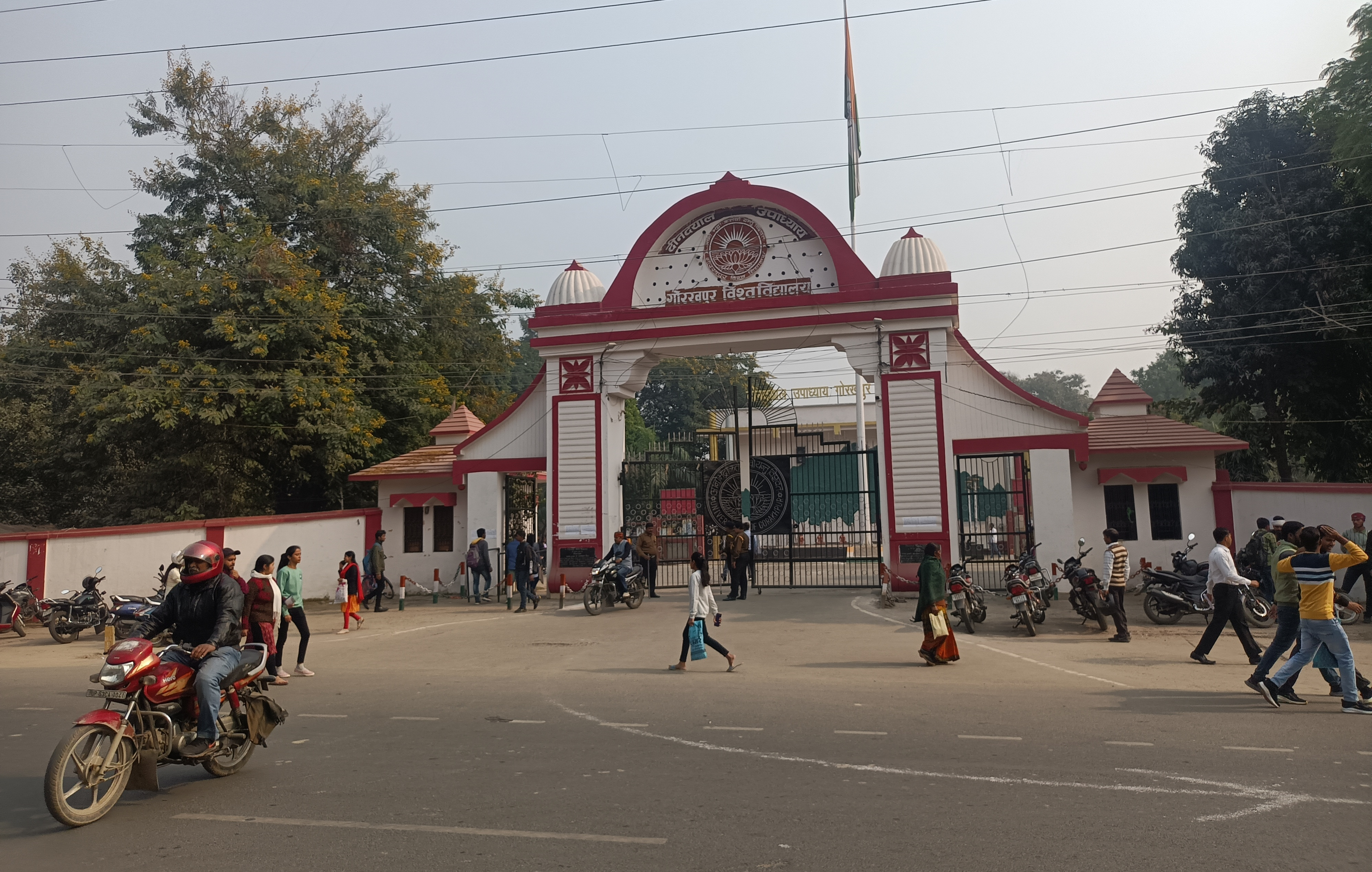
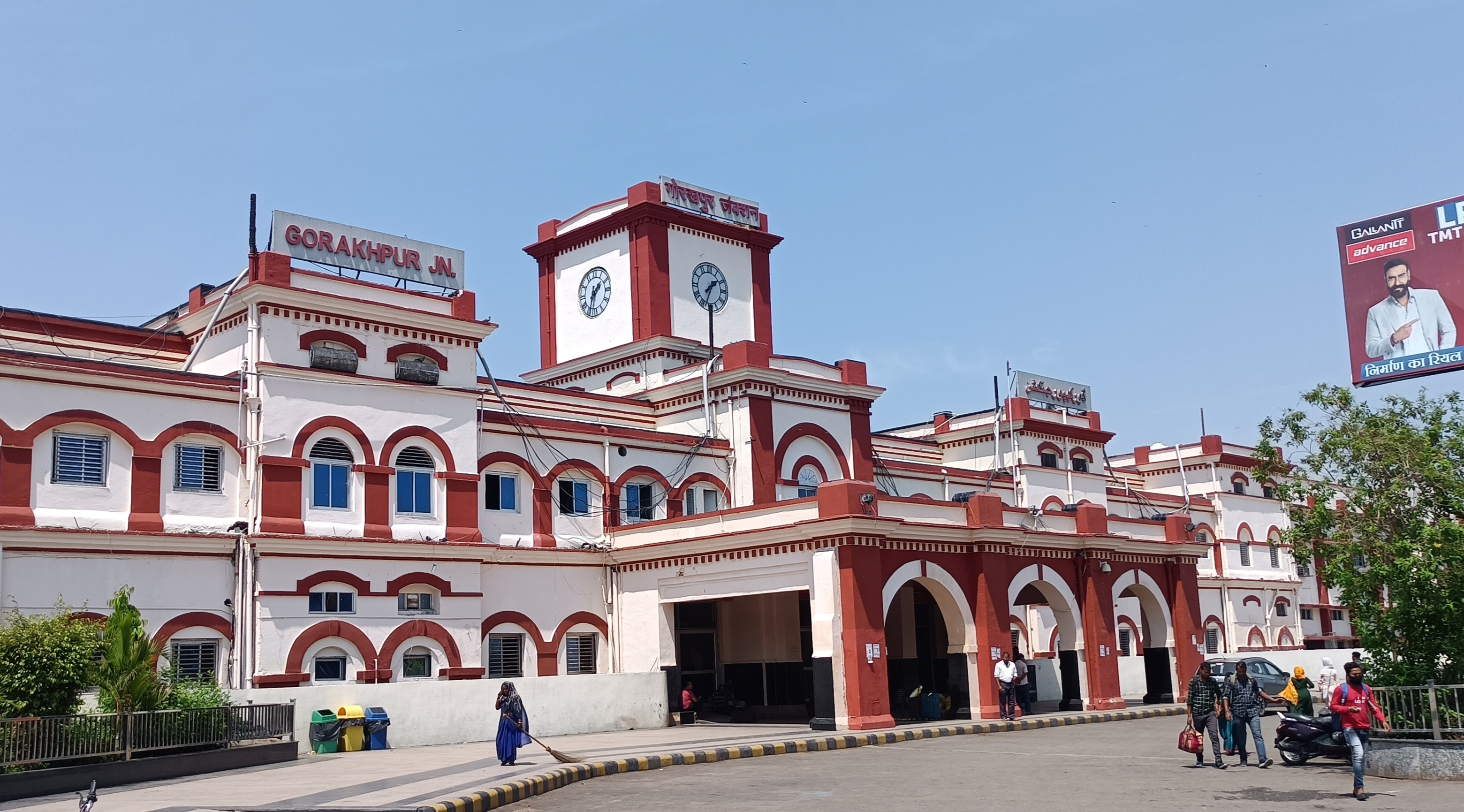
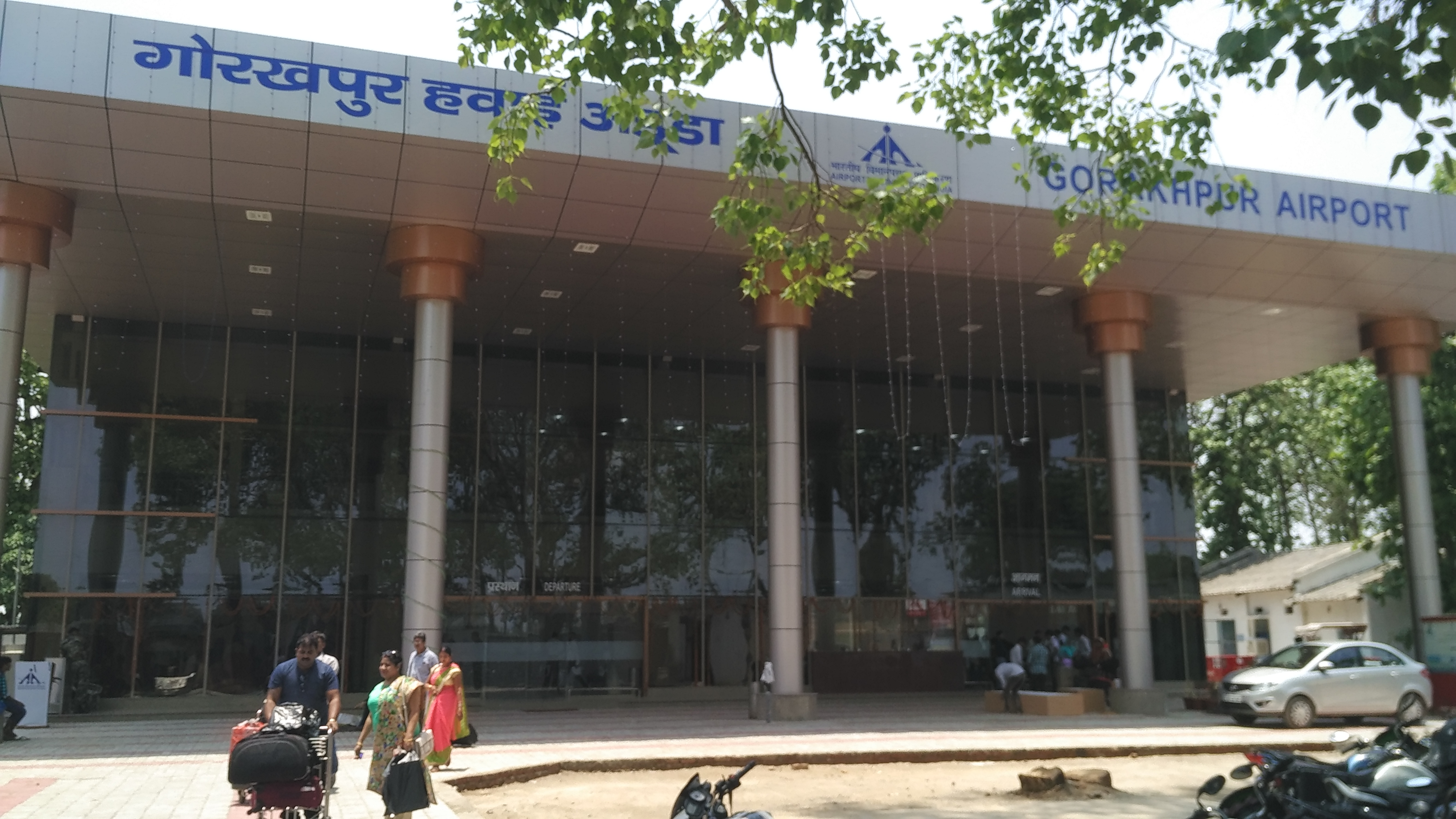
- Gorakhnath Temple MMM university AIIMS Gorakhpur Gorakhpur University Gorakhpur railway station Gorakhpur Airport

- Location within Uttar Pradesh Location within India
- Coordinates: 26.7637152°N 83.4039116°E
- Country: India
- State: Uttar Pradesh
- District: Gorakhpur
- Division: Gorakhpur
- Established: 1801
- Named for: Gorakhnath

Government
  - Type: Municipal Corporation
  - Body: Gorakhpur Municipal Corporation
  - Mayor: Manglesh Kumar Srivastava (BJP)
  - Lok Sabha MP: Ravi Kishan, (BJP)
  - Municipal Commissioner: Avinash Singh

Area
  - GMC: 226.0 km^{2} (87.3 sq mi)
  - Metro: 1,041.0 km^{2} (401.9 sq mi)
- Elevation: 75 m (246 ft)

Population (2011-2020 hybrid)
  - GMC: 1,300,000
  - Density: 5,800/km^{2} (15,000/sq mi)
  - Metro: 2,500,000
- Demonym(s): Gorakhpuri, Gorakhpuriya

Language
  - Official: Hindi
  - Additional official: Urdu
  - Regional: Bhojpuri
- Time zone: UTC+5:30 (IST)
- PIN: 2730xx
- Telephone code: +91-0551
- Vehicle registration: UP-53
- Sex ratio: ♂1000/903♀
- Avg. annual temperature: 26 °C (79 °F)
- Avg. summer temperature: 40 °C (104 °F)
- Avg. winter temperature: 18 °C (64 °F)
- Website: gorakhpur.nic.in Gorakhpur News

Gorakhpur (Bhojpuri pronunciation: [ɡoˈɾəkʰ.pʊɾ]) is a city in the Indian state of Uttar Pradesh, along the banks of the Rapti river in the Purvanchal region. It is situated 272 kilometres east of the state capital, Lucknow. It is the administrative headquarters of Gorakhpur district, North Eastern Railway Zone and Gorakhpur division. The city is home to the Gorakhnath Math, a Gorakhnath temple. The city also has had an Indian Air Force station since 1963. Gita Press, the world's largest publisher of Hindu religious texts like Ramayana and Mahabharata, has been established here since 1926. (Note: Gita press was initially formed in 1923 and started publishing only since 1927)

== Etymology ==
The name "Gorakhpur" comes from the Sanskrit Gorakshapuram, which means abode of Gorakshanatha, a renowned ascetic who was a prominent saint of the Nath Sampradaya.

== History ==
The earliest forerunners of the settlement at Gorakhpur were probably "considerably to the north of the present town" because the course of the Rapti was then more to the north and east than it is today; it would have flowed through the present-day city and gone through what is now the Ramgarh Tal. Farmers digging wells in the 1800s/early 1900s would sometimes encounter pieces of old boats, which is indicative of the river's shift in course. The site of Gorakhpur would have been desirable for a human settlement because of its secure location — it is protected on the south and west by the Rapti and Rohin rivers, and in the past there were dense forests on the north and east, offering protection on those sides as well.

The earliest event described in local tradition is the legendary construction of the Mansarowar and Kauladah tanks, in the area now called Purana Gorakhpur, in the 10th century. They are said to have been built by a married couple — Mansarowar is attributed to the husband, the prince Man Sen, while Kauladah is attributed to the wife, Kaulavati. Sometime after that, the area is said to have been ruled by a group known as the Domkatars Bhumihars, who built the Domingarh fort at the confluence of the Rapti and Rohin rivers. Still later, Gorakhpur is said to have been ruled by the Shrinet Rajputss of Satasi. Sometime around 1400, a family dispute is said to have prompted one branch of the Satasi dynasty to leave the old stronghold, on the shore of Ramgarh Tal, and move to a new location in what is now Purana Gorakhpur, near the shrine of the renowned ascetic Gorakhnath.

=== Mughal period ===
In any case, Gorakhpur had become a large town by the time of Akbar, in the late 1500s. The earliest contemporary reference to a Mughal garrison at Gorakhpur is in 1572, when it was governed by Payanda Khan on behalf of Munim Khan, then subahdar of Jaunpur. Gorakhpur was for a long time the main Muslim garrison north of the Ghaghra, which may explain why it has such a prominent Muslim presence compared to other parts of the district.

In the Ain-i-Akbari (c. 1595), Gorakhpur is listed as the capital of a sarkar in the subah of Awadh. Sarkar Gorakhpur was divided into 24 mahals, and Gorakhpur itself was one of them. The mahal of Gorakhpur was listed with an assessed revenue of 567,385 dams and was expected to supply 200 infantry and 40 cavalry to the Mughal army. It was described as having a brick fort on the Rapti.

Gorakhpur also had a mint under Akbar, issuing copper coins only. By the time of Aurangzeb, the Gorakhpur mint was also issuing silver coins. During the 1600s, based on Jean-Baptiste Tavernier's account of his travels in India, Gorakhpur played an important role as a centre for trade with the northern mountain regions.

In the late 1600s, Gorakhpur was officially renamed Mu'azzamabad in honour of Prince Mu'azzam (the later Bahadur Shah I), and this name was used in official documents until the British takeover in 1801. After Emperor Bahadur Shah's ascension in 1707, Chin Qulich Khan was appointed faujdar of Gorakhpur but resigned in 1710 due to a loss of favour. From this time, local Rajput chiefs, known as rajas, exercised de facto control over the region, assigning lands and titles, with minimal intervention from the Mughal imperial officers.

=== Awadh Period ===
In 1722, Saadat Khan was appointed subahdar of Avadh, which included Gorakhpur. By 1724, he established himself as the independent ruler of Avadh, although he remained nominally under the Mughal emperor. His early efforts focused on reducing the power of powerful local rajas in the southern parts of the region, while his authority was weaker in the northern areas. The Gorakhpur region experienced significant lawlessness in the north, with marauding Banjaras under the leadership of Tilak Sen of Butwal causing destruction. Saadat Khan sent forces to suppress these activities, though the Banjaras would often return to plunder once the Nawab's army withdrew.

Saadat Khan's death in 1739 saw his nephew, Safdar Jang, take control. During Safdar Jang's reign, a Muslim garrison stationed at Gorakhpur mutinied, which was quelled by a large army sent by the Nawab. The region remained under the control of the Nawabi administration, but local rulers still held considerable sway. Agriculture flourished, and essential goods like rice became abundant, though the Banjaras continued to raid the area.

In 1754, Shuja-ud-Daula succeeded Safdar Jang. His reign saw continued agricultural prosperity, and in 1769-70, he visited Gorakhpur on a hunting trip where he encountered wild elephants in the forest. Shuja-ud-Daula's rule was followed by that of his son Asaf-ud-Daula. During Asaf-ud-Daula's time, Colonel Hannay, a British officer, was appointed to oversee the district's military and revenue affairs. His harsh methods caused significant suffering, with many cultivators abandoning their lands. The Banjaras also played a disruptive role in the local politics.

In 1801, following financial difficulties, Nawab Saadat Ali Khan ceded Gorakhpur to the East India Company through the Treaty of 10 November 1801, bringing an end to the control of the Nawab of Awadh over the region.

=== British Period ===
In the early 19th century, the British East India Company took control of Gorakhpur and its surrounding territories following the Treaty of 1801, marking the beginning of British rule in the region. Owing to the proximity of this region to Nepal, the British started to station troops in the area to resist Nepalese incursions. A cantonment was set up in the eastern part of the city, and the region played a role in the Anglo-Nepalese War (1814–1816). Although General Wood’s campaign from Gorakhpur to Butwal was unsuccessful, the Treaty of Sugauli (1815), which concluded the conflict, ensured that the region remained under British control. After the war, Gorakhpur underwent various administrative changes. In 1829, it was made the headquarters of a division, and over the following decades, it was restructured several times as part of British administrative reforms.

In the 1840s, the British implemented land revenue settlements in the region. These policies were designed to standardise revenue collection, but they led to growing dissatisfaction among local zamindars and peasants. The area also suffered from natural disasters, including the drought of 1837 and the famine of 1873-74, which contributed to the region’s economic difficulties. During the Indian Rebellion of 1857, Gorakhpur witnessed local participation in the uprising. Muhammad Hasan, a local leader, declared himself the ruler of Gorakhpur and forced the British to retreat temporarily. However, the British reasserted control by August 1858 with the help of Gurkha forces. Following the reoccupation, the British confiscated estates and executed or exiled several key figures involved in the revolt. They also established the Moti Jail in Gorakhpur, where many of the rebels were imprisoned.

Municipal governance in Gorakhpur began to take shape in the late 19th century. A local committee was formed on 7 September 1869, and the municipal committee was officially established on 4 December 1873 under the North-Western Provinces and Oudh Municipalities Act. It became a municipal board in 1884. The municipality managed local taxation and civic services, with revenue derived from octroi, livestock taxes, and market fees.

In the early 20th century, Gorakhpur became a center of political activity. The region gained national attention during the Chauri Chaura incident in February 1922, when a violent confrontation between police and protestors led to the deaths of 22 policemen. This event resulted in the suspension of the Non-Cooperation Movement by Mahatma Gandhi. In the years that followed, Gorakhpur remained an important site for nationalist movements, including the Civil Disobedience Movement and the Quit India Movement. The region saw visits from leaders such as Madan Mohan Malaviya, Jawaharlal Nehru, and Sarojini Naidu, who supported the anti-colonial protests. During the Quit India Movement, Gorakhpur experienced widespread protests, arrests, and repression by the British authorities. Local fighters from Gorakhpur also participated in the Indian National Army’s struggle against British rule. In 1947, India gained independence, and Gorakhpur became part of the newly formed state of Uttar Pradesh.

== Geography ==
Gorakhpur city is located in the north-easterrn part of Uttar Pradesh, India, within the Indo-Gangetic Plain. The city's geographical coordinates are 26.7663° N latitude and 83.3689° E longitude, with an altitude of 69 metres (229 feet) above sea level. Gorakhpur is situated about 100 km from the Nepal border, 193 km from Varanasi, 260 km from Patna and 270 km from Lucknow. Gorakhpur has been ranked 4th best “National Clean Air City” under (Category 2 3-10L Population cities) in India.

=== Topography ===
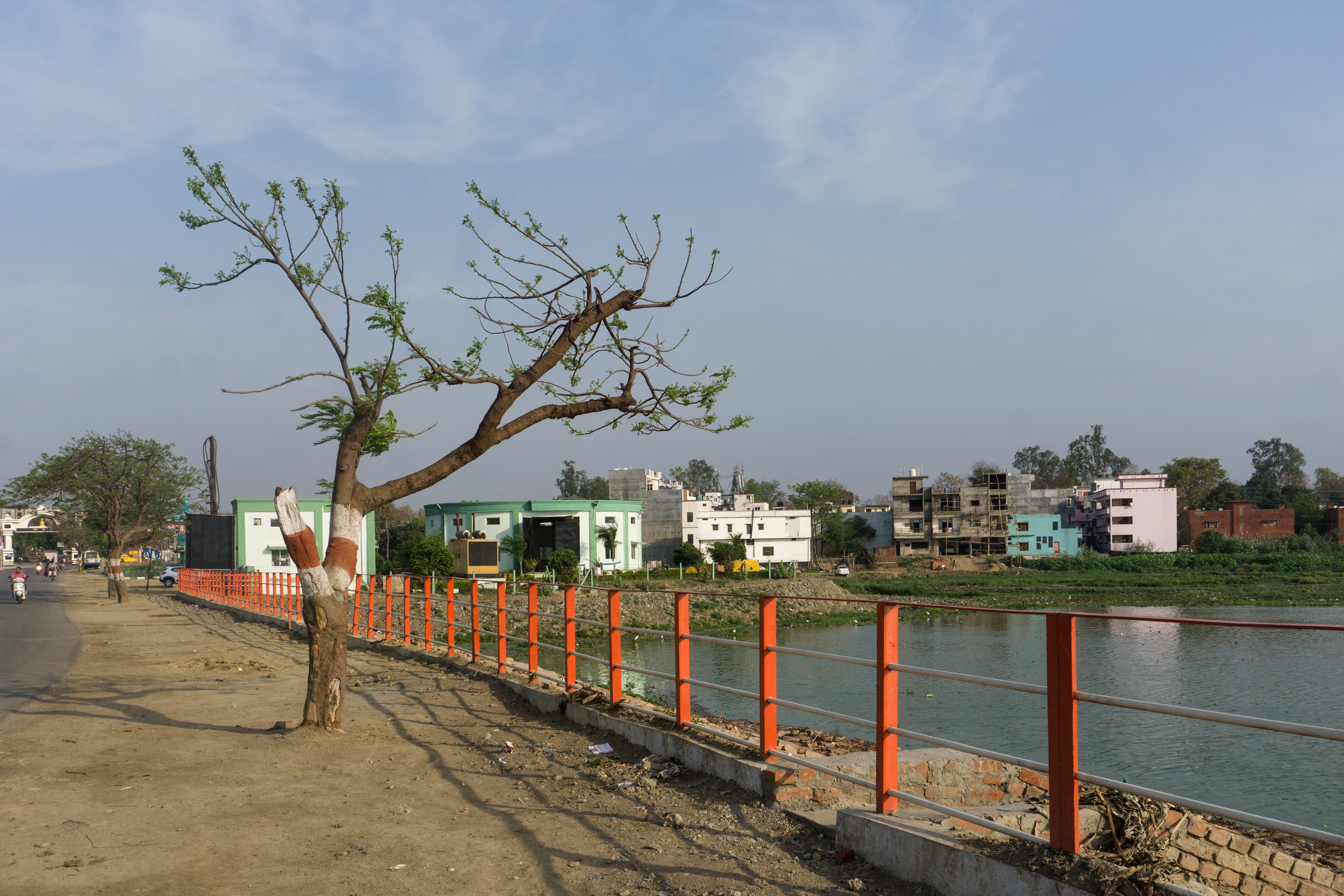
Ramgarh Tal Lake

Gorakhpur lies within the Indo-Gangetic Plain, characterised by its flat and low-lying terrain. This plain, composed of fertile alluvial soil, is a result of centuries of sediment deposition by the region’s rivers. The city itself, at an altitude of 69 metres (229 feet), is situated in this expansive landscape, which is predominantly flat with minimal elevation changes. This vast alluvial plains around the city provides fertile soil for agriculture.

Gorakhpur is situated at the confluence of Rohni with Rapti river, which is a tributary of the Ghaghara river. The Rapti River is the primary watercourse that flows through Gorakhpur, significantly influencing the city’s topography. The river's course once shifted, leading to the formation of Ramgarh Tal Lake, located in the eastern part of the city. This lake, originally covering an area of 723 hectares (1,790 acres) in 1970, now spans around 678 hectares (1,680 acres). The Bakhira Sanctuary, located 44 km west of Gorakhpur, is the largest natural floodplain wetland in India, covering 29 sq km. It serves as an important habitat for migratory birds and is recognised as a Ramsar site. Another notable aquatic feature is the Maheshra Tal lake, located to the north of the city, which supports a rich ecosystem of phytoplankton and zooplankton.

Gorakhpur is one of the flood vulnerable districts in Eastern Uttar Pradesh. Data over the past 100 years show a considerable increase in the intensity and frequency of floods, with extreme events occurring every three to four years. Roughly 20% of the population is affected by floods, which are an annual occurrence in some areas, causing huge loss of life, health, and livelihoods for the poor inhabitants, as well as damage to public and private property.

=== Climate ===
Gorakhpur experiences a tropical wet and dry climate, with three distinct seasons: summer, monsoon, and winter. The Köppen climate classification subtype for this climate is Cwa (dry-winter humid subtropical climate). The summer season in Gorakhpur is characterised by high temperatures, especially in April and May, when maximum temperatures often reach 49.4 °C (120.9 °F). The average daily maximum temperature during summer is 37.4 °C (99.3 °F) in April and 38.0 °C (100.4 °F) in May. Precipitation during the summer months is limited, with May receiving 46.2 mm (1.82 inches) of rainfall.

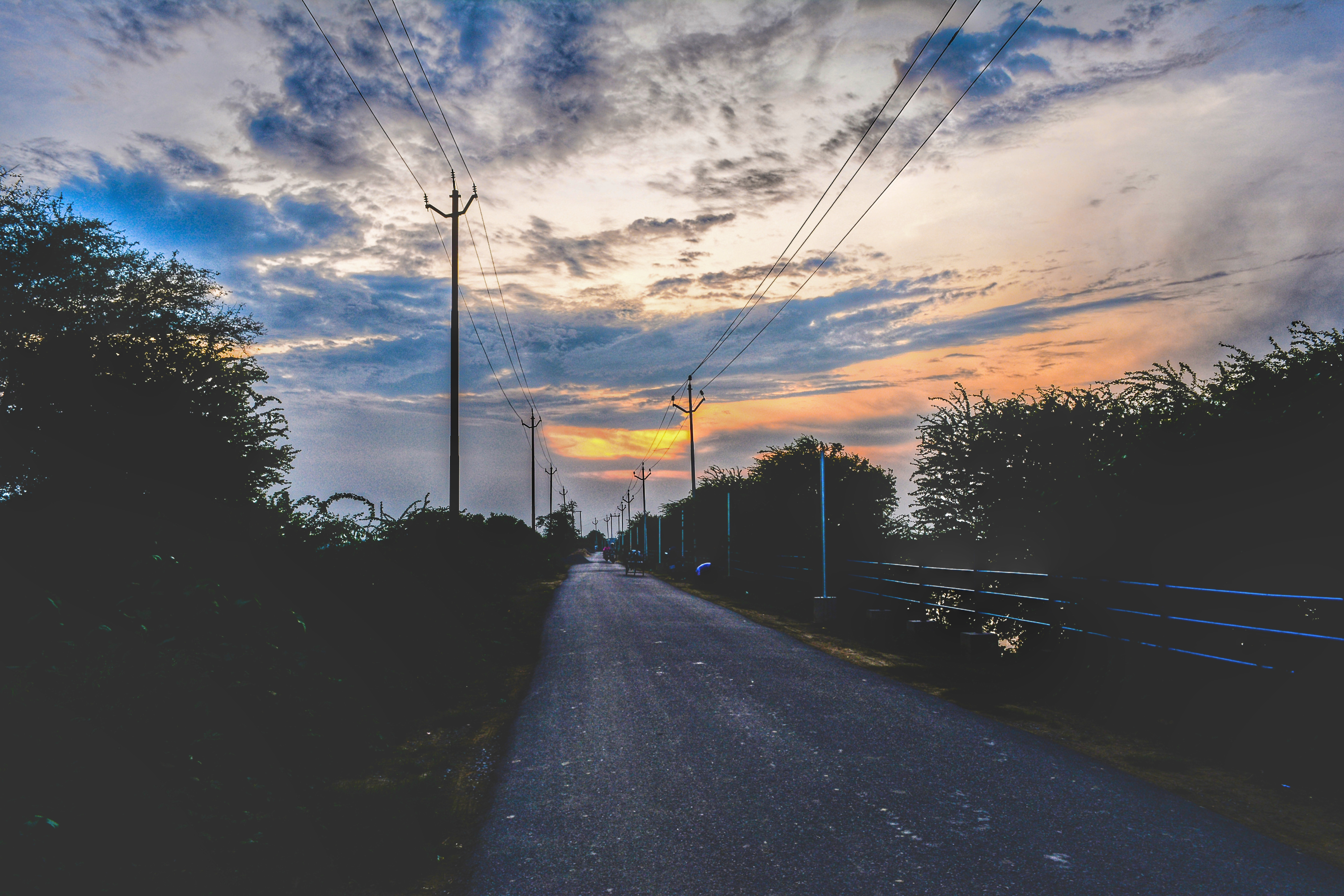
Clouds over Gorakhpur during Monsoon season

The monsoon season brings heavy rainfall to Gorakhpur, contributing to the city's annual average rainfall of 1,240.9 mm (48.85 inches). The heaviest rainfall occurs in July and August, with 353.5 mm (13.92 inches) and 330.8 mm (13.02 inches) respectively. The average maximum temperature during this period is 32.9 °C (91.2 °F) in June, which gradually decreases in the subsequent months. The region experiences high humidity, reaching up to 76% in August. Winter in Gorakhpur is relatively mild, with the coldest month being January. The daily minimum temperature can drop to 1.0 °C (33.8 °F) in December and January. The maximum temperature during the winter months averages 20.7 °C (69.3 °F) in January. Rainfall during winter is minimal, with only 14.8 mm (0.58 inches) in January and 1.1 mm (0.04 inches) in November.

Climate data for Gorakhpur (1991-2020, extremes 1901-2020)
Month	Jan	Feb	Mar	Apr	May	Jun	Jul	Aug	Sep	Oct	Nov	Dec	Year
Record high °C (°F)	30.0 (86.0)	35.4 (95.7)	42.4 (108.3)	45.0 (113.0)	49.4 (120.9)	46.5 (115.7)	43.2 (109.8)	39.5 (103.1)	38.5 (101.3)	37.4 (99.3)	36.8 (98.2)	30.5 (86.9)	49.4 (120.9)
Mean daily maximum °C (°F)	20.7 (69.3)	26.0 (78.8)	32.1 (89.8)	37.4 (99.3)	38.0 (100.4)	36.3 (97.3)	32.9 (91.2)	32.7 (90.9)	32.6 (90.7)	32.3 (90.1)	29.4 (84.9)	23.8 (74.8)	31.2 (88.2)
Daily mean °C (°F)	14.8 (58.6)	19.1 (66.4)	24.2 (75.6)	29.5 (85.1)	31.4 (88.5)	31.4 (88.5)	29.6 (85.3)	29.4 (84.9)	28.9 (84.0)	26.5 (79.7)	21.6 (70.9)	16.6 (61.9)	25.3 (77.5)
Mean daily minimum °C (°F)	8.8 (47.8)	11.8 (53.2)	16.3 (61.3)	21.3 (70.3)	24.5 (76.1)	26.1 (79.0)	26.1 (79.0)	25.8 (78.4)	24.9 (76.8)	20.9 (69.6)	14.8 (58.6)	10.3 (50.5)	19.2 (66.6)
Record low °C (°F)	1.0 (33.8)	2.8 (37.0)	8.1 (46.6)	12.2 (54.0)	16.6 (61.9)	16.1 (61.0)	18.1 (64.6)	20.2 (68.4)	17.4 (63.3)	12.5 (54.5)	6.7 (44.1)	2.8 (37.0)	1.0 (33.8)
Average rainfall mm (inches)	14.8 (0.58)	15.6 (0.61)	7.9 (0.31)	10.5 (0.41)	46.2 (1.82)	187.8 (7.39)	353.5 (13.92)	330.8 (13.02)	220.7 (8.69)	47.8 (1.88)	1.1 (0.04)	4.1 (0.16)	1,240.9 (48.85)
Average rainy days	1.2	1.6	0.7	0.9	3.1	7.4	13.2	13.0	8.7	2.0	0.2	0.3	52.3
Average relative humidity (%) (at 17:30 IST)	67	54	39	31	39	56	73	76	74	68	67	69	59
Source 1: India Meteorological Department
Source 2: Tokyo Climate Center (mean temperatures 1991–2020)

=== Flora and fauna ===
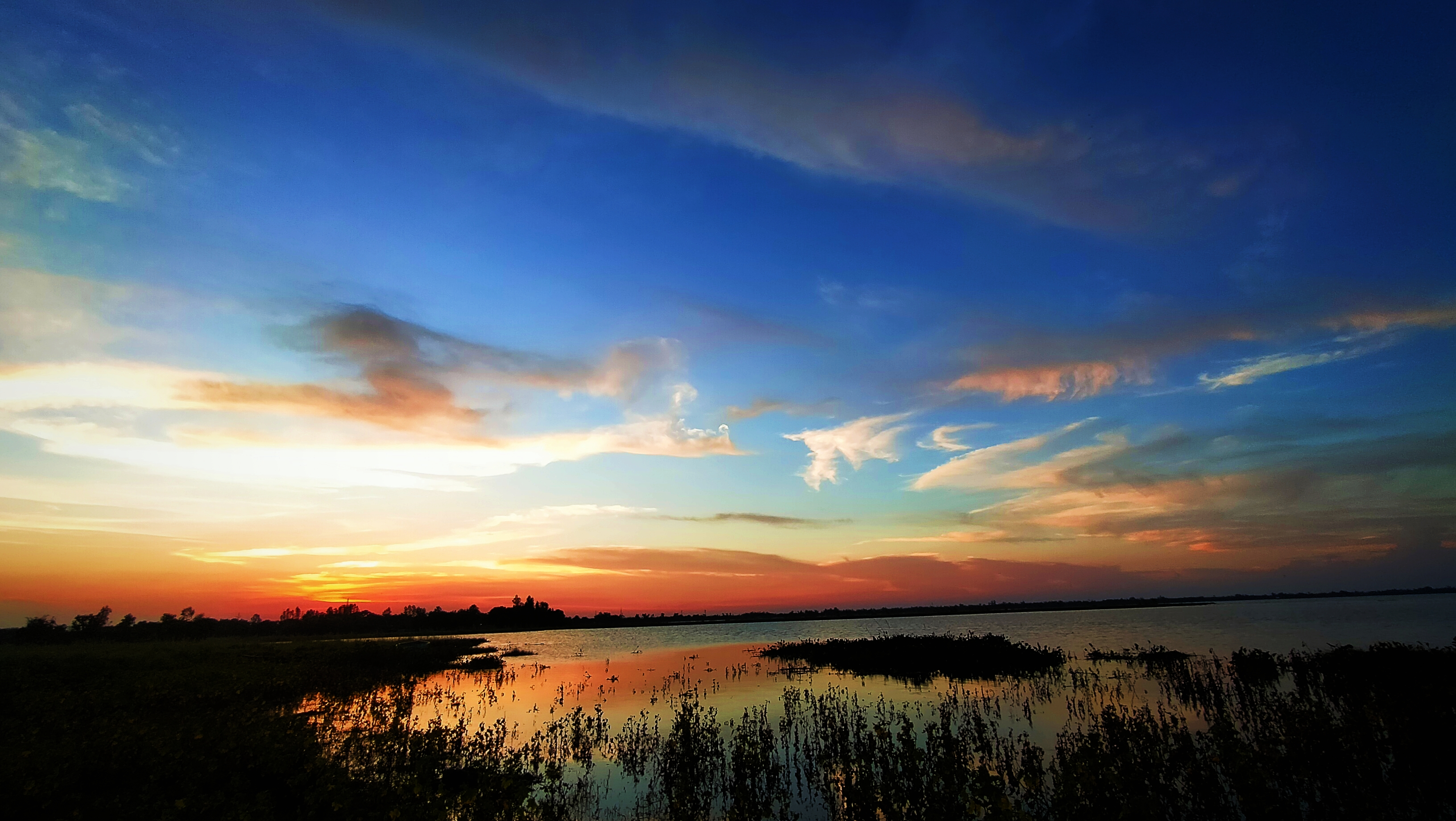
The Bakhira Bird Sanctuary, a Ramsar Site, plays a significant role in the preservation of migratory bird habitats.

Gorakhpur’s geography is marked by several protected areas and diverse ecosystems. The Kushmi Forest, located to the east of the city, is a dense, government-managed forest area primarily dominated by Sal trees. This forest is part of a broader conservation effort and has been designated for eco-tourism development by the Government of Uttar Pradesh. The region's flora thrives in the fertile alluvial soils of the Indo-Gangetic Plain, with various species found in the city's parks and protected areas.

Gorakhpur's fauna includes a diverse range of species, particularly within the Shaheed Ashfaq Ullah Khan Zoological Park and the nearby Bakhira Bird Sanctuary. The zoo houses over 387 animals from 58 species, including Asiatic lions, tigers, rhinoceros, and various species of birds. The Bakhira Bird Sanctuary is especially significant for migratory birds, including those from Siberia, which travel over 5,000 km to winter in the wetlands. The Maheshra Tal to the north of the city also supports aquatic life, adding to the region's biodiversity.

== Demographics ==
Historical population
Year	Pop.	±%
1901	64,148	—
1911	56,892	−11.3%
1921	57,985	+1.9%
1931	75,644	+30.5%
1941	95,127	+25.8%
1951	132,436	+39.2%
1961	180,255	+36.1%
1971	230,911	+28.1%
1981	307,501	+33.2%
1991	505,566	+64.4%
2001	622,701	+23.2%
2011	673,446	+8.1%
Source: District Census Handbook 2011

As of 2011 Indian Census, Gorakhpur had a total population of 673,446, of which 353,907 were males and 319,539 were females. It has a sex ratio of 903 females per 1000 males. The population within the age group of 0 to 6 years was 69,596. Gorakhpur had a literacy rate of 75.2%, of which male literacy was 79.4% and female literacy was 70.6%. The effective literacy rate of the 7+ population of Gorakhpur was 83.9%, of which the male literacy rate was 88.7% and the female literacy rate was 78.6%. The Scheduled Castes and Scheduled Tribes population was 62,728 and 2,929, respectively. Gorakhpur had 112,237 households in 2011.

The population of Gorakhpur has shown consistent growth from 64,148 in 1901 to 673,446 in 2011. After a slight decline in the early years, the population started increasing steadily, with notable growth after 1951. By 1981, the population had grown significantly, reaching over 300,000. The growth continued through the 1990s, with the population more than doubling from 1981 to 1991. From 2001 to 2011, the population rose by 8.1%, reaching 673,446.

According to a 2020 report, 31 villages have been incorporated in the municipal corporation limits increasing the population to over 1 million. The city area has also increased from 145.5 km^{2} in 2011 to 226.6 km^{2}.

The state government has also declared Gorakhpur, as a metropolis on 22 November 2021. Apart from Gorakhpur Municipal Corporation, the government has declared three nagar panchayats and eight development blocks as a metropolitan area. For this, the urban Development Department has issued a notification to the city. According to the order issued by the Additional Chief Secretary, Urban Development, now in Gorakhpur Metropolitan Region, Municipal Corporation, Nagar Panchayat Pipraich, Nagar Panchayat PPganj, Nagar Panchayat Mundera Bazar, Chargawa, Khorabar, Pipraich, Sardar Nagar, Piprauli, Jungle Kaudiya, Campierganj and The entire area of Bhathat development block has been covered. After this the population of Gorakhpur metropolis will be around 25 lakhs.

=== Religion ===
Religion in Gorakhpur City (2011)
Religion	Percent
Hinduism	77.88%
Islam	20.61%
Christianity	0.74%
Other or not stated	0.77%

Hinduism is the predominant religion in Gorakhpur, with 77.88% of the population adhering to it. Islam is the second most widely practised faith, followed by about 20.61% of the city's residents. Christianity is practised by 0.74% of the population, while Jainism, Sikhism, and Buddhism are followed by 0.04%, 0.18%, and 0.07%, respectively. Additionally, 0.01% of people identify with "Other Religions," and around 0.48% do not follow any particular religion.

=== Languages ===
Languages in Gorakhpur (2011)
1. Hindi (82.4%)
2. Urdu (10.6%)
3. Bhojpuri (6.26%)
4. Others (0.76%)

As per the 2011 Census data for Gorakhpur, the majority of the population speaks Hindi, accounting for 82.41% of the total population. Urdu is the second most spoken language, with 10.57% of the people using it, while Bhojpuri is spoken by 6.26% of the population. 0.76% of the residents speak other languages.

Hindi is the most widely spoken language in the city and serves as the official language for administration and education being the official language of the state. Urdu is the additional official language of the state and is mostly spoken by the Muslim residents of the city. English is also used as a medium for instruction in some schools.

Although Hindi is the most spoken language in the city, many of those recorded as speaking 'Hindi' actually speak Bhojpuri. The specific dialect spoken in and around Gorakhpur is known as 'Gorakhpuri', a sub-dialect of the Northern Standard Bhojpuri, which is typically spoken between the Ghaghara and Gandak rivers. The Gorakhpuri dialect closely resembles those of Central and Northern Saran, with only slight differences.

== Governance ==
Gorakhpur's governance is structured through multiple administrative bodies to ensure effective management and inclusivity. The Gorakhpur Municipal Corporation (Nagar Nigam Gorakhpur) serves as the city's primary governing entity, responsible for infrastructure, public services, and special initiatives for vulnerable groups, including Persons with Disabilities (PwD). It is led by a democratically elected mayor and council members. The Gorakhpur Development Authority (GDA), established under the Uttar Pradesh Urban Planning and Development Act of 1973, focuses on the city's urban planning and development initiatives, emphasising accessibility for all people. At the divisional level, the Divisional Commissioner oversees four districts, including Gorakhpur, and is responsible for local government institutions, infrastructure development, and maintaining law and order. Additionally, the Gorakhpur Industrial Development Authority (GIDA), formed by the Uttar Pradesh Government on 30 November 1989, under the Uttar Pradesh Industrial Development Act, manages industrial development while integrating accessibility standards for inclusive growth.

These entities collaborate to ensure efficient governance, sustainable development, and inclusivity, addressing the needs of all citizens, including PwD.

=== Municipal finance ===
According to financial data published on the CityFinance Portal of the Ministry of Housing and Urban Affairs, the Gorakhpur Municipal Corporation reported total revenue receipts of ₹197 crore (US$24 million) and total expenditure of ₹187 crore (US$22 million) in 2022–23. Tax revenue accounted for about 14.7% of the total revenue, while the corporation received ₹152 crore in grants during the financial year.

== Transport ==
=== Railways ===
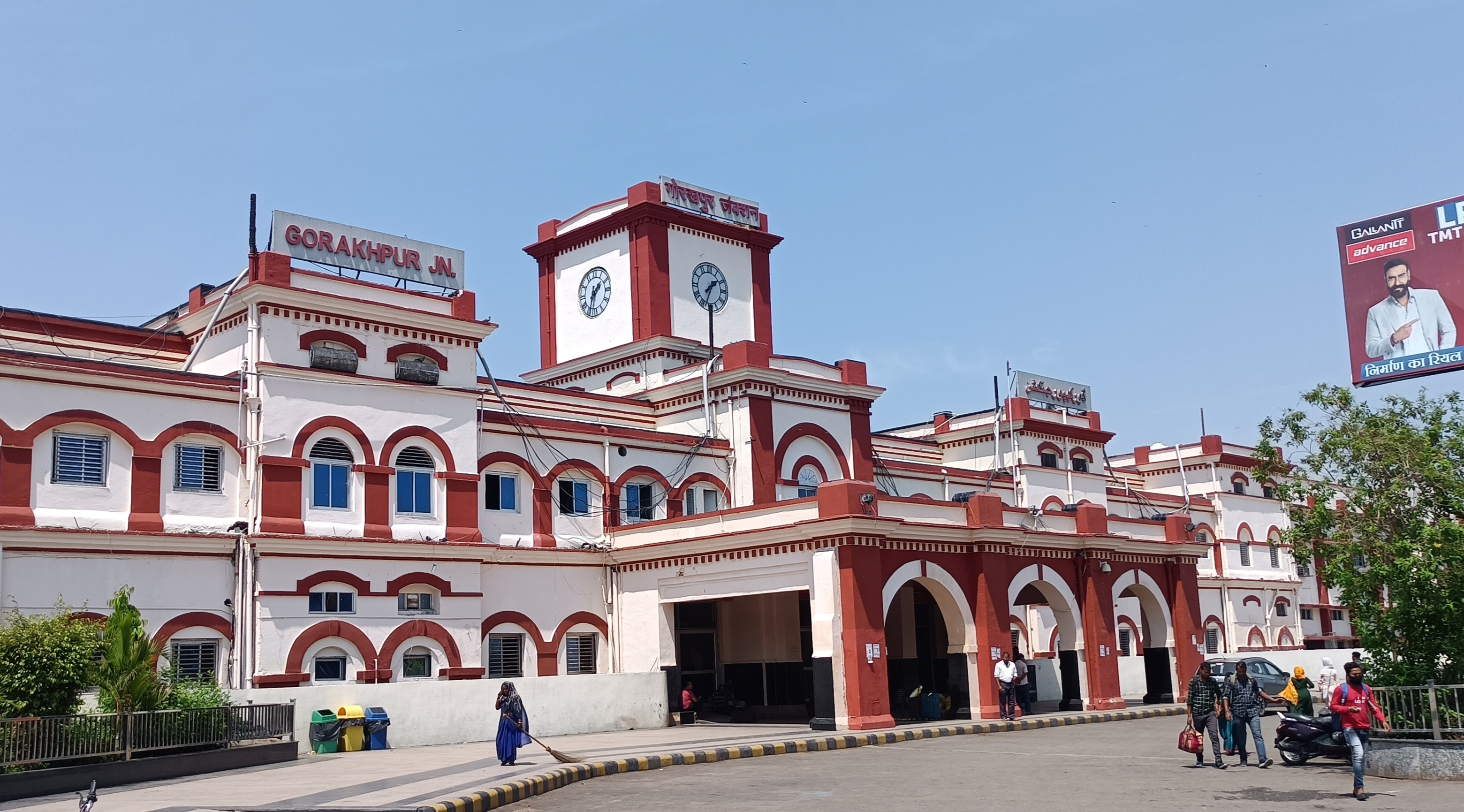
Gorakhpur Junction railway station

Gorakhpur is connected through a rail network and Gorakhpur railway station. Until March 2021, it had world's longest platform of 1366 meters. (Note: Since March 2021 Hubballi railway station's Pf no.1 is world longest platform, its length is 1,505 meters.) In February 2020, 100 flowering pots with the support structures were made and installed on the hydrant pipe at platform No.2 to increase the plantation and natural cover, using local resources of the Gorakhpur coaching depot.

The station offers Class A-1 railway station facilities. From 6 October 2013, Gorakhpur had the world's longest railway platform, after inauguration of the remodelled Gorakhpur Yard, with a stretch of around 1,355.40 metres (0.84 mi).

Gorakhpur is the headquarters of North Eastern Railways.

=== Roadways ===
Gorakhpur is connected by several major national highways. National Highway 27 (NH 27) connects Gorakhpur with Gopalganj, Mehsi and Muzaffarpur in Bihar. The Mehsi–Muzaffarpur section forms an important part of NH 27 in Bihar.

=== Air ===
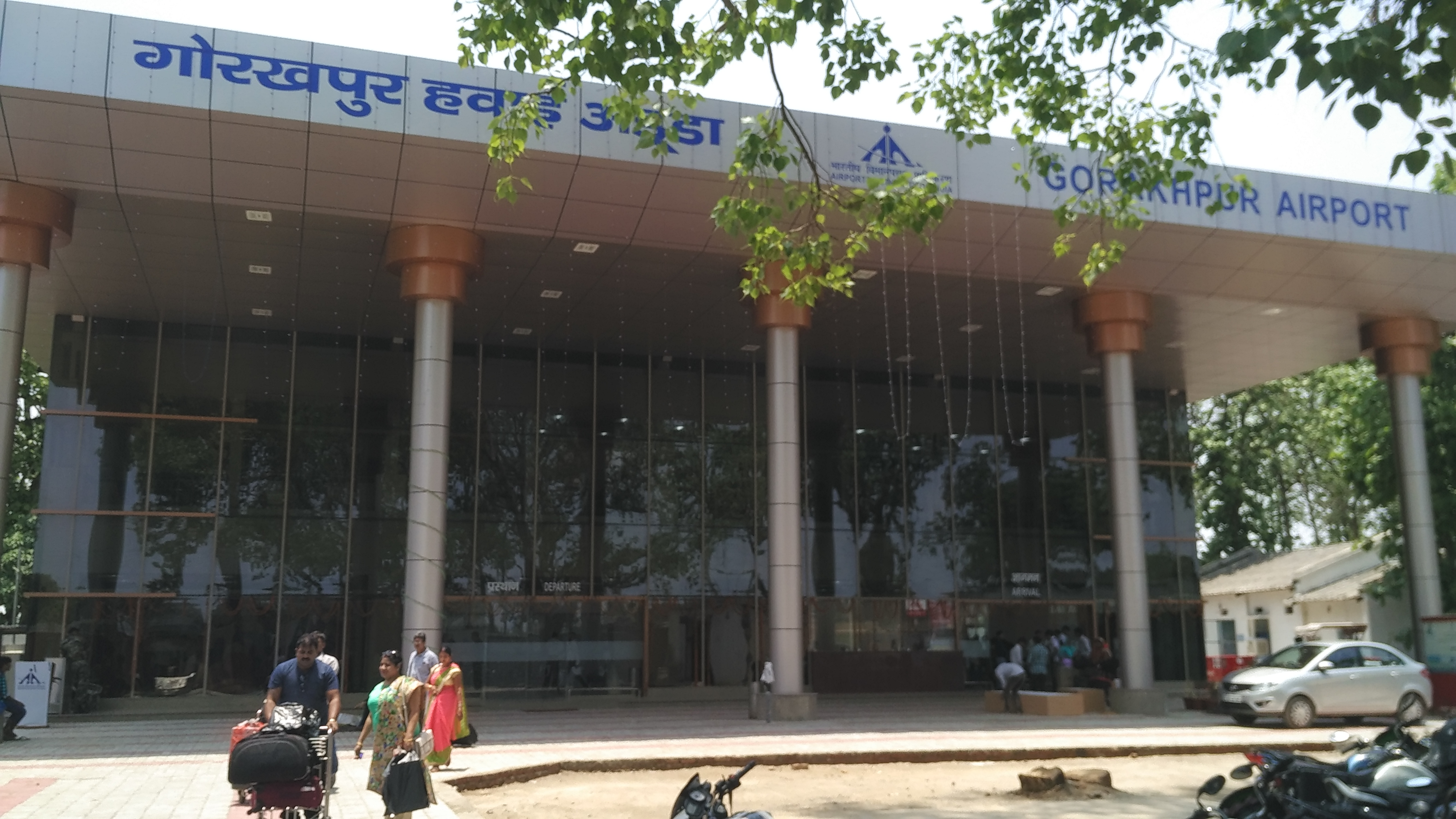
A look at the entrance of Mahayogi Gorakhnath Airport

An Air Force station of Indian Air Force was established in Gorakhpur in 1963 named Mahayogi Gorakhnath Airport and extended for public air transport.

=== Metro ===
Gorakhpur Metro is a light metro project with 2 line and 27 stations is light rail transit (LRT) system approved to be built in Gorakhpur. It consist two corridors covering a distance of 27.84 km. On 1 December 2021 the central government has also approved the DPR of Gorakhpur light metro project.

== Education ==
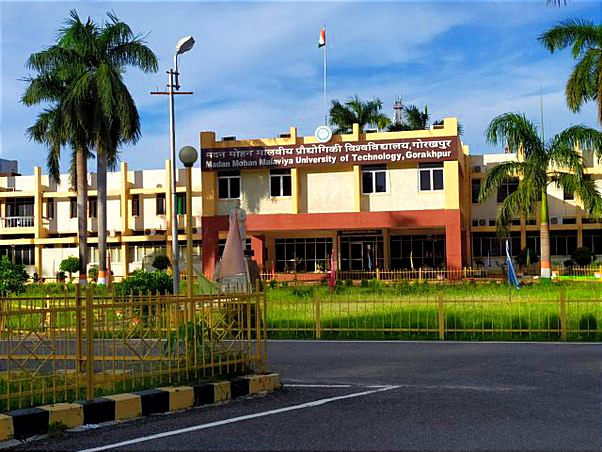
Administrative Block of MMMUT

- AIIMS Gorakhpur
- Baba Raghav Das Medical College
- Deen Dayal Upadhyay Gorakhpur University
- Madan Mohan Malaviya University of Technology
- Maha Yogi Guru Gorakhnath Ayush University,
- Mahayogi Gorakhnath University.
- National Institute of Electronics & Information Technology, Gorakhpur,
- Veer Bahadur Singh Sports College

== Sports ==
- Veer Bahadur Singh Sports College, Gorakhpur
- Syed Modi Railway Stadium
- Mini Sports complex, Bhati Vihar Gorakhpur
- Regional Stadium, Civil Lines.
- Water Sports Complex, Nauka Vihar, Gorakhpur,

== Notable people ==
- Yogi Adityanath, 21st and current Chief Minister of Uttar Pradesh, has served in Gorakhpur as a Member of Parliament and is the head priest of the Gorakhnath Temple.
- Zoya Afroz, actress and model, winner of Femina Miss India Indore 2013, linked to Gorakhpur.
- Radha Mohan Das Agarwal, National General Secretary of the Bharatiya Janata Party and a Member of Parliament (Rajya Sabha)
- Leo Amery, Former Secretary of State for the Colonies of the United Kingdom.
- Mahant Avaidyanath, Indian politician and Hindu guru, led the Gorakhnath Temple in Gorakhpur.
- Janaki Devi Bajaj, illiterate social reformer from Pipraich Block near Gorakhpur.
- Premindra Singh Bhagat, recipient of Victoria Cross, connected with Gorakhpur.
- Ram Prasad Bismil, revolutionary, executed for the Kakori Conspiracy in Gorakhpur.
- Herbert Bridgman, A prominent member of the family that established a massive estate in the Maharajganj forests. The family was central to the colonial administration of the "Terai" (lowlands) and many of their descendants were born on these rural estates.
- A. C. L. Carlleyle, was an English archaeologist active in India.
- Markandey Chand, Indian politician.
- Hemant Chaturvedi, Indian cinematographer.
- Pankaj Chaudhary, Indian politician and a Member of Parliament, Lok Sabha.
- Reena Choudhary, Political and social worker and a member of parliament.
- Edmund Craigie, English first-class cricketer and barrister.
- Alexander Cunningham, British Army engineer who was interested in Indian archaeology. In 1861, he was appointed as archaeological surveyor to the government of India and he founded and organised what later became the Archaeological Survey of India.
- Sir Frederick Currie, 2nd Baronet, English baronet, the eldest child of Sir Frederick Currie, 1st Baronet.
- Baba Raghav Das, social worker and philanthropist, established Kushth Sewa Ashram in Gorakhpur.
- Ram Upendra Das, economist, associated with Gorakhpur.
- Digvijaynath, founder of Gorakhpur University, nationalist leader.
- Amrapali Dubey, actress, primarily in Bhojpuri films, hails from Gorakhpur.
- Preeti Dubey, Indian field hockey player.
- Ravi Dubey, actor, model, television presenter, and producer, born in Gorakhpur. Also worked in Hans Zimmer's Ramayanam (2026 film) and many shows & web series.
- Saurabh Dubey (Uttar Pradesh cricketer), Indian cricketer.
- Sourav Dubey, is an Indian cricketer. He is a right-handed batsman who currently plays for Tripura.
- Saeeda Faiz, educator and social reformer from Ghazipur, Uttar Pradesh, with connections to Gorakhpur.
- Saqi Farooqi, British-Pakistani poet who wrote in both Urdu and English.
- Firaq Gorakhpuri, Urdu poet, recipient of the Gyanpeeth Award, associated with Gorakhpur.
- Majnun Gorakhpuri, Urdu writer and literary critic
- Narendra Hirwani, cricketer, set a national record for wickets in a test match, based in Gorakhpur.
- Cheddi Jagan, His parents migrated from the Basti district. He became the first Chief Minister and later the President of Guyana.
- Anurag Kashyap, film director, renowned for his contributions to Hindi cinema, associated with Gorakhpur. Director of Gangs of Wasseypur, Bombay Talkies, Bombay Velvet and No Smoking (2007 film)
- Nitasha Kaul, British-Indian academic, writer and poet based in London.
- Farhat Basir Khan, photographer and media studies academic, associated with Gorakhpur.
- Kamal Kishor, Indian politician and a former Member of Parliament of India.
- Ahmar Lari, Urdu writer and poet from Gorakhpur.
- Suhail Zaheer Lari, Pakistani historian and author who focused on the history of the Sindh region.
- Zafrul Ahsan Lari, was an ICS (Punjab Cadre) Administrator from the 1934 batch.
- Zahirul Hasnain Lari, was a lawyer, a known Muslim League leader.
- Henry Lawrence (Indian Army officer), he was the Revenue Surveyor of Gorakhpur (1833)
- Honoria Lawrence, Though born in Ireland, she was the first European woman to live extensively in the Gorakhpur/Basti region (1833–1837). Her journals provide the most detailed account of "white" life in Gorakhpur during that era.
- Surjit Singh Majithia, industrialist and philanthropist, contributed to the development of Gorakhpur.
- Tabassum Mansoor, Indian educationist in Libya, from Gorakhpur.
- Bhadase Sagan Maraj (Trinidad and Tobago):, His grandparents were from Basti. He was a legendary politician and the founder of the Sanatan Dharma Maha Sabha in Trinidad.
- Daler Mehndi, famous Punjabi singer, started his career in Gorakhpur.
- Vidya Niwas Mishra, Hindi-Sanskrit littérateur and journalist, associated with Gorakhpur.
- Syed Modi, national badminton champion and Arjuna Awardee, trained in Gorakhpur.
- Mahendra Nath Mulla, officer of the Indian Navy, recipient of Maha Vir Chakra, born in Gorakhpur.
- Muhibbullah Lari Nadwi, was an Indian Islamic scholar.
- Meenakshi Narain, an Indian-born American experimental physicist. She was a Professor of Physics and Chair of the Department of Physics at Brown University from Providence, Rhode Island, and was also Chair of the Collaboration Board of US institutions in the Compact Muon Solenoid (CMS) Collaboration in the United States. She contributed to the discovery of the top quark in 1995 and Higgs Boson in 2012.
- Jamuna Nishad, Indian politician, connected with Gorakhpur.
- Praveen Kumar Nishad, Indian politician, associated with Gorakhpur.
- Sanjay Nishad, politician, founder of NISHAD Party, linked to Gorakhpur.
- Sarvan Kumar Nishad, Indian politician, engineer, and a member of the 18th Uttar Pradesh Assembly.
- Sri Niwas, Indian geophysicist and a professor at the Department of Earth sciences of IIT Roorkee.
- Vinod Panday, Indian politician, current National Executive Member and former President of BJP Kisan Morcha.
- Kamlesh Paswan, politician and Member of Parliament, 17th Lok Sabha, connected to Gorakhpur.
- Vipin Patwa, politician and social worker, involved in activities related to Gorakhpur.
- Hanuman Prasad Poddar, editor of Kalyan, propagated Hinduism globally through his publications in Gorakhpur.
- Mahaveer Prasad, Indian politician.
- Visharad Phirangi Prasad, Indian politician. He was the member of 6th Lok Sabha.
- Premchand, Hindi writer, worked as a teacher in Gorakhpur (1916-1921).
- Nivruti Rai, head of Intel India and vice-president of Intel Foundry Services.
- Abdur Raqib (cricketer), former Pakistani first-class cricketer, born in Gorakhpur, India.
- Hansu Ram, Indian politician, farmer, and a member of the 18th Uttar Pradesh.
- Lawrence Reade (cricketer, born 1846), was a New Zealand solicitor and cricketer.
- Subrata Roy, Indian businessman, founder of Sahara India Pariwar, linked to Gorakhpur.
- Sushila Saroj, Member of the 15th Lok Sabha of India.
- Asit Sen, Bollywood actor, has ties to Gorakhpur.
- Sunil Shastri, Former Rajya Sabha MP, Former-MLA Gorakpur Urban, Former Minister in Government of Uttar Pradesh.
- Jimmy Sheirgill, actor, known for work in Hindi and Punjabi cinema, has roots in Gorakhpur. Worked in films like Mohabbatein, Special 26, Munna Bhai M.B.B.S. and many more.
- Bandhu Singh, revolutionary and freedom fighter, linked to Gorakhpur.
- Billy Arjan Singh, conservationist and author, active in Gorakhpur.
- Lilavati Singh, social worker, born in Gorakhpur.
- Pradeep Shukla is an Indian politician and a member of 18th Legislative Assembly of Uttar Pradesh.
- Prakash Shukla, Indian contract killer, known for his criminal activities in Gorakhpur.
- Saurabh Shukla, actor, director, known for roles in films like PK (film), Kick (2014 film), Bala (2019 film), Raid 2 (film), Jolly LLB 2, Jolly LLB 3 and many more, born in Gorakhpur.
- Shiv Pratap Shukla, the Governor of Himachal Pradesh, has ties to Gorakhpur.
- Janardan Singh Sigriwal, famous wrestler, known as Bharat Bhim, trained in Gorakhpur.
- Amardeep Singh, Indian researcher, writer, photographer and documentary filmmaker based in Singapore.
- Geetanjali Singh, actress, known for television roles in shows like Tumhari Paakhi, born in Gorakhpur.
- Kedarnath Singh, poet, critic, from Gorakhpur.
- Ravindra Singh, Indian politician.
- Vir Bahadur Singh, former Chief Minister of Uttar Pradesh, architect of modern Gorakhpur.
- Prem Maya Sonir, hockey player, Arjuna Awardee, Indian Women’s Hockey Team captain, from Gorakhpur.
- Neelam Sonkar, Indian politician.
- K. K. Srivastava, Indian poet and author
- Manglesh Kumar Srivastava, mayor of Gorakhpur
- Bhishma Shankar Tiwari, is an Indian politician.
- Hari Shankar Tiwari, politician, notable for his influence in Uttar Pradesh politics, from Gorakhpur.
- Aman Mani Tripathi, Indian politician and a member of 17th Legislative Assembly of Uttar Pradesh.
- Amarmani Tripathi, politician, former MLA from Uttar Pradesh
- Rishi Tripathi, Indian politician and a member of the 18th Uttar Pradesh Assembly.
- Surti Narayan Mani Tripathi, first ICS of UP, founder of Gorakhpur University.
- Mahadevi Varma was an Indian poet and essayist who studied at Gorakhpur University.
- Abhishek Yadav (cricketer), Indian cricket.
- Arun Kumar Yadav (Uttar Pradesh politician), politician and a member of 17th Legislative Assembly, Uttar Pradesh.
- Baleshwar Yadav (politician), Indian politician.
- Baleshwar Yadav (singer), politician, former MP from Uttar Pradesh, active in Gorakhpur.
- Sanjay Yadav (cricketer), Indian cricketer
- Vijay Bahadur Yadav, Indian politician and a member in 15th and 16th Legislative Assembly of Uttar Pradesh.
- Paramahansa Yogananda, yogi and spiritual teacher, introduced Kriya Yoga globally, has ties to Gorakhpur.

== See also ==
- Gorakhpur Cantonment railway station
- St. John's Church, Gorakhpur
