= Markanda (disambiguation) =

Markanda is a former name for the city of Samarkand in Uzbekistan.

Markanda or Markandeya may also refer to:

- Markandeya Hill, Kolar, Karnataka, India
- Markandeya River, Eastern Ghats, a river in Karnataka and Tamil Nadu, India
- Markandeya River, Western Ghats, a river in Belgaum district, Karnataka, India
- Markanda River, Haryana, a seasonal river in India
- Shahabad Markanda, a town in Kurukshetra, Haryana, India
- Markandeya, an ancient Hindu rishi (sage)
  - Markanda Mahadev, Chamorshi, an 8th-century Hindu temple complex in Chandrapur, Maharashtra, India
  - Markandeya Purana, a Hindu religious text
  - Markandeya (film), a 1935 Indian film
  - Bhaktha Markandeya, a 1957 Indian film
- Markandeyan, a 2011 Indian film

== People ==
- Markandey Chand, an Indian politician
- Markandey Katju, a judge of the Supreme court of India
- Ram Lal Markanda, an Indian politician
