= Ravindra Singh =

Ravindra Singh may refer to:

- Ravindra Singh (film director), Indian film director and producer
- Ravindra Singh Bisht, Indian archaeologist
- Ravindra Singh (ichthyologist), Ichthyologist.
- Ravindra Singh Kushwaha, naxal leader and Indian politician from Bihar
- Ravindra Singh (politician), Indian politician
