= Bakhira Sanctuary =

Protected wetland in India

- IUCN category IV (habitat/species management area)
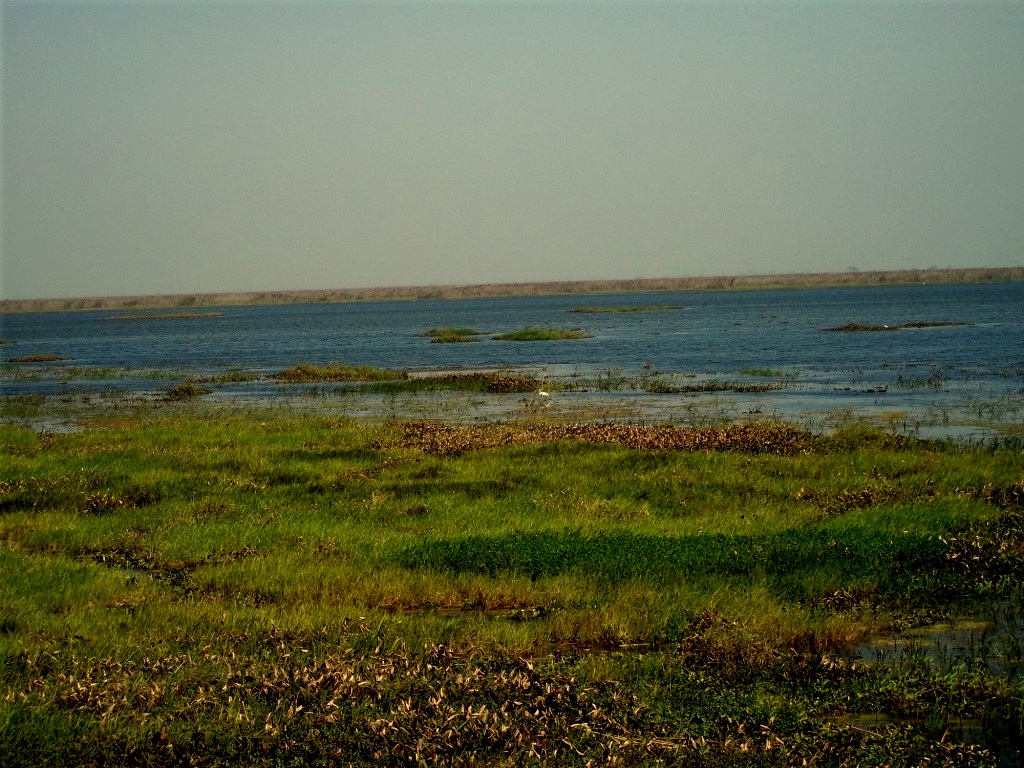
- Bakhira lake

- Location within Uttar Pradesh Location within India
- Interactive map of Bakhira Sanctuary
- Location: Sant Kabir Nagar district of Eastern Uttar Pradesh, India
- Nearest city: sant Kabir nagar district
- Coordinates: 26.9063589°N 83.104282°E
- Established: 1980
- Governing body: Government of India

Ramsar Wetland
- Official name: Bakhira Wildlife Sanctuary
- Designated: 29 June 2021
- Reference no.: 2465

The Bakhira Bird Sanctuary is the largest natural flood plain wetland of India in Sant Kabir Nagar district of Eastern Uttar Pradesh. The sanctuary was established in 1980. It is situated 44 km west of Gorakhpur city 18 km away from Khalilabad and 55 km away from Basti. It is a vast stretch of water body expanding over an area of 29 km^{2}. This is an important lake of eastern UP, which provides a wintering and staging ground for a number of migratory waterfowls and a breeding ground for resident birds. This is also used for farming activities as it is connected to Bakhira Canal which covers the people of 15 km from its origin. The sanctuary is named after the village Bakhira located adjacent to the lake along with as many as hundred and eight villages surrounding the lake within the 5 km radius. The villagers from the surrounding villages depend on the wetland for their livelihood in the form of fishing, agricultural activities and fuelwood collection from it. The Siberians birds travel across 5000 km to get to these wetlands at the time of winter's.

It was designated as a Ramsar Site on World Wetlands Day (2 February 2022).

== Bird migrations ==
Best time to visit to Bakhira lake is in winters Nov–Jan. During this time migratory birds from Tibet, China, Europe & Siberia come here, covering about 5000 km.

== Tourism ==
By Road-1. Can be accessed via Gorakhpur-Khalilabad (35 km), through NH-28, then 17 km on Khalilabad-Bansi road 2. From Gorakhpur to Sahjanwa (20 km) on NH-28, then 23 km from Sahjanwa to Jaswal Bharwaliya & 3 km from Jaswal Bharwaliya village By Rail-Nearest railhead Khalilabad on Gorakhpur-Lucknow NER Railway Line By Air-Gorakhpur Airport 49 km

== Attraction ==
The Grey-headed swamphen (Porphyrio poliocephalus) also called the Indian Purple moorhen or Purple Swamp-hen is one of the beautiful common water birds found in India. A handsome but clumsy purplish blue bird with long red legs and toes, bald red forehead and size resembling the village hen. This bird is a common breeding resident of this sanctuary and is locally coined with the name "Kaima".

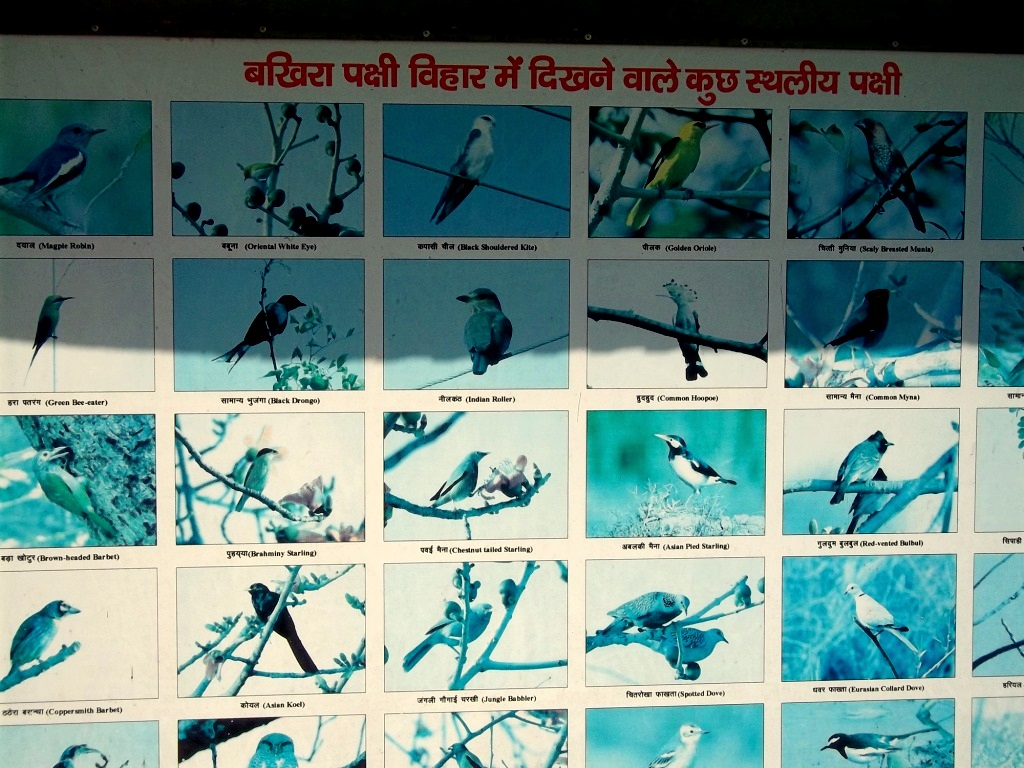
Types of birds coming to bakhira, Poster of forest department office in bakhira

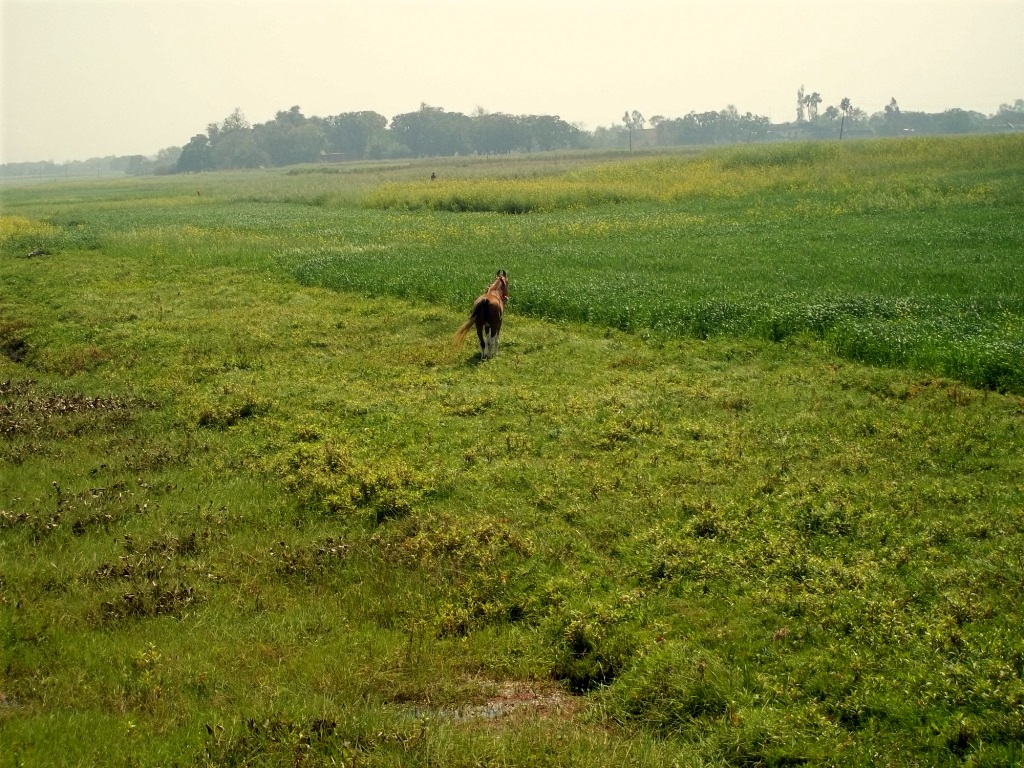
Farm lands near lake

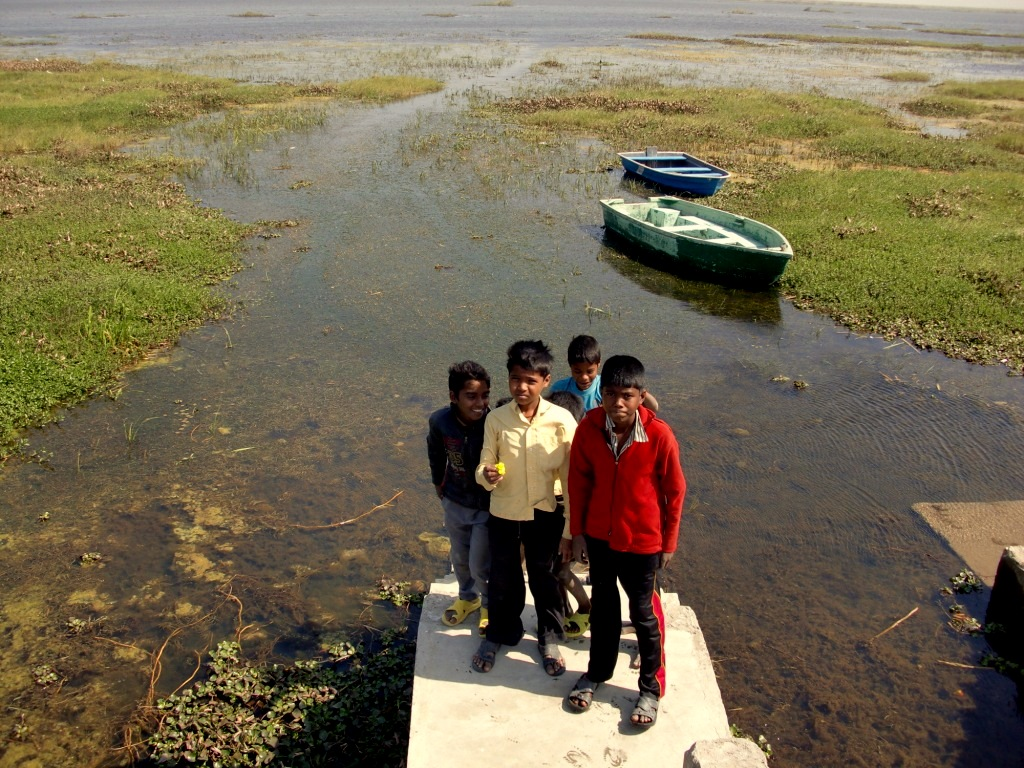
Local children

There are more than 30 species of fish found in the lake. However the dominant species are Labeo rohita and Chana sp.
