= Mahayogi Guru Gorakhnath AYUSH University =

State University in India

- Former names: State Ayush University, Uttar Pradesh
- Type: State
- Established: 2020
- Chancellor: Governor of Uttar Pradesh
- Vice-Chancellor: Prof. (Dr.) K. Rama Chandra Reddy
- Location: Gorakhpur, Uttar Pradesh, India; 26.739393°N 83.360846°E
- Website: www.mggaugkp.ac.in

Mahayogi Guru Gorakhnath AYUSH University, Gorakhpur, formerly the State Ayush University, Uttar Pradesh, is an affiliating state university located Pipari, Bhathat, Uttar Pradesh 273306 in Gorakhpur. It was established through the Uttar Pradesh Act No. 6 of 2020, specializing in ayurveda, yoga, naturopathy, Unani, Siddha and homoeopathy (AYUSH). It was renamed as Mahayogi Guru Gorakhnath AYUSH University, Gorakhpur by the Uttar Pradesh Act No. 6 of 2021.

== History ==
After winning the 2017 Assembly Election, the BJP-led Uttar Pradesh Government established the Department of AYUSH in the same year. In December 2020, the Uttar Pradesh Chief Minister, Yogi Adityanath, announced the establishment of an 'AYUSH University' in Gorakhpur. Then President Ram Nath Kovind laid the foundation stone of the university in Gorakhpur on 28 August 2021, in the presence of Uttar Pradesh Governor Anandiben Patel, Chief Minister Yogi Adityanath, and several other local politicians. UP CM Yogi Adityanath inaugurated OPD services on 15th Feb 2023. President Draupadi Murmu is expected to inaugurate university on 30th June 2025.

== Vice-Chancellor ==
The first Vice-Chancellor was appointed by the Government's Chief Minister and will serve a term of three years. Successive Vice-Chancellors will be appointed by the Chancellor (Governor of Uttar Pradesh) every three years. Awadhesh Kumar Singh was appointed as Founder Vice-Chancellor on 4 January 2022. Current VC is Prof. (Dr.) K. Rama Chandra Reddy from 20th March 2025.

== Academics ==
The university became functional in 2022, with affiliated colleges in the state that teach ayurveda, Unani, homeopathy, yoga, and naturopathy. In the 2024-25 academic session, 97 AYUSH colleges/institutes (covering Ayurveda, Homeopathy, and Unani) are affiliated to University, with around 7000 students in UG and PG courses. University is offering BAMS, MD/MS (Unani) and MD/MS (Ayurveda) courses.

== Location ==
The university is constructed on 52 acres at Pipri and Tarkulha Village Panchayat in Bhathat Block of Gorakhpur District. Earlier, the village of Malmaliya under Chari Chaura Tehsil was proposed as a location for the university, but after local cultivators filed a case in High Court, a new location was sought.

== Infrastructure ==
The university's construction was targeted to be complete by March 2023. The first phase of construction included the administrative building, yoga building, ayurveda, and naturotherapy facilities. Before its completion, administration activities commenced on Sitapur Eye Hospital premises, as well as the Vice-Chancellor residence.
