= Vinod Panday =

Indian politician

Vinod Panday is an Indian politician who currently National Executive Member and Former President of BJP Kisan Morcha. He was also National Secretary of the BJP and a former-member of the Uttar Pradesh Legislative Council.

Pandey is from the Basti district of Uttar Pradesh, but his field of work has been Gorakhpur. He started his career as a lawyer in the civil court, is also known as an ardent speaker in the party and a master of the Bharatiya Janata Party. In 2014, he was appointed as the state in charge of Jharkhand Lok Sabha Election.
