= Nivruti Rai =

Indian businesswoman (born c. 1969)

- Born: c. 1969; Gorakhpur, Uttar Pradesh, India
- Occupations: Head of Intel India, Vice President of Intel Foundry Services
- Known for: Promoting rural broadband internet connectivity, Innovations in semiconductor chips
- Awards: Nari Shakti Puraskar

Nivruti Rai (born c. 1969) was the head of Intel India and vice president of Intel Foundry Services. She has received the Nari Shakti Puraskar, the highest civilian honour for women in India.

== Career ==
Nivruti Rai was born c. 1969 in Gorakhpur in the Indian state of Uttar Pradesh. She studied for a Ba at Lucknow University. She then got married and moved to the US in her twenties, gaining a BSc in mathematics and operations research from the Rensselaer Polytechnic Institute, New York, and then a Masters in engineering at Oregon State University. She started working at Intel in 1994 and moved to Bengaluru, capital city of Karnataka in 2005. She was granted permanent visa status as an Overseas Citizen of India the following year by then-President Manmohan Singh.

As of 2022, she was head of Intel India and vice president of Intel Foundry Services, training over 150,000 students in 7,000 schools. The previous year, she told The Hindu Business Line "India is the largest R&D house for Intel outside of the United States and we are continuing to grow". She also joined the board of directors of Tata Technologies.

On International Women's Day 2022, Rai received the Nari Shakti Puraskar from President Ram Nath Kovind alongside 28 other women, including Shobha Gasti, who is also from Karnataka. She was recognised for her work in promoting rural broadband internet connectivity and innovations in semiconductor chips.
