= Saeeda Faiz =

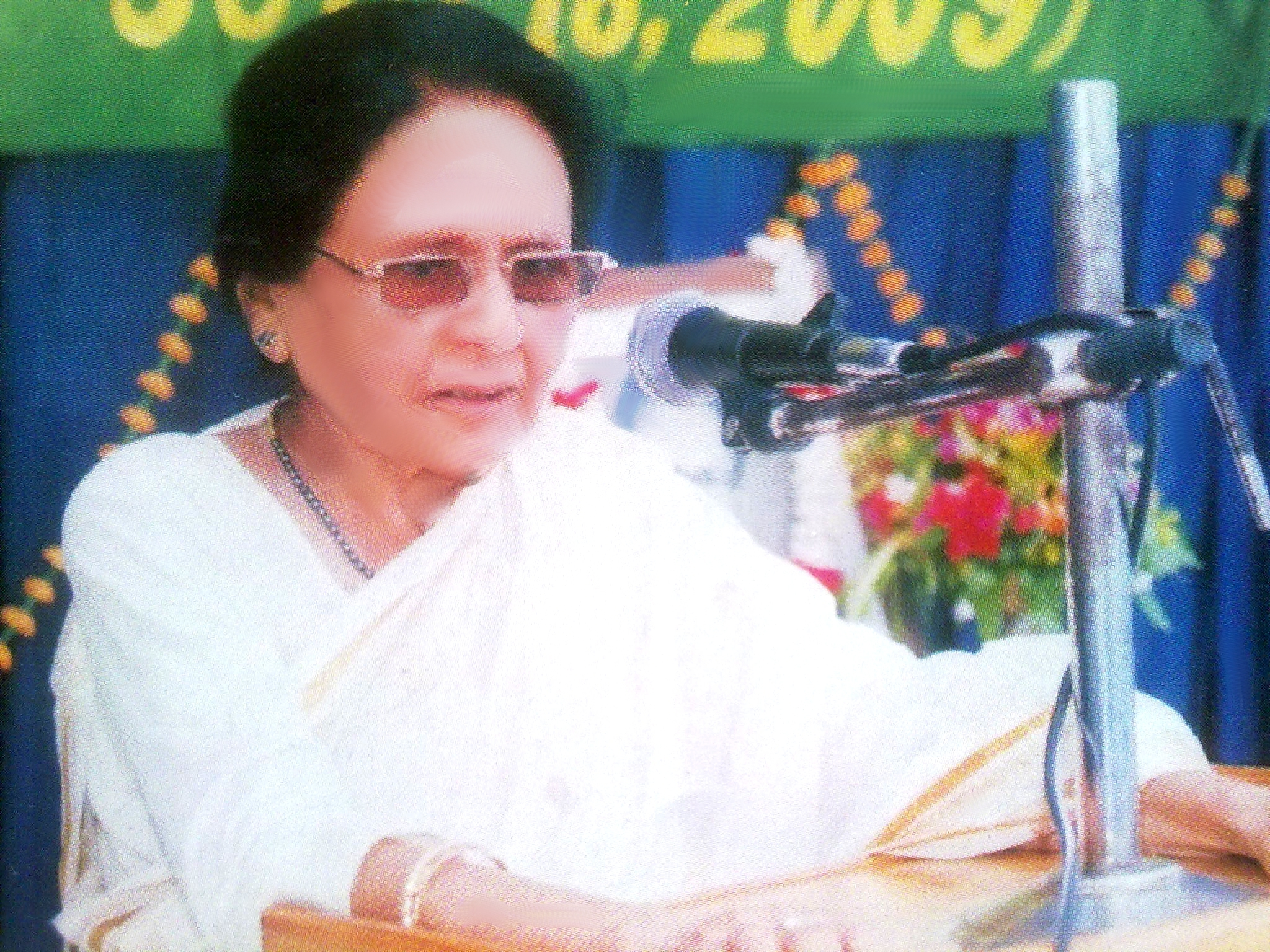
- Born: 9 June 1925; Gorakhpur, Uttar Pradesh, India
- Died: 14 September 2010 (aged 85)
- Other names: Saeeda Adami, Aapa
- Occupations: Educationist, social reformer
- Known for: Teacher in Government Girls' School, Basti; Principal of Government Girls Inter College, Ghazipur; Founder Manager of Shah Faiz Public School, Ghazipur
- Spouse: Shah Abul Faiz
- Parent(s): Sulaiman Adami (father), Mariam Adami (mother)

Muhtarame Saida Faiz Sahiba (Hindi: स्व॰ सईदा फैज, Urdu: محترمہ سعیدہ فیض صاحب; 9 June 1925 – 14 September 2010) was an educationalist and social reformer from Ghazipur, Uttar Pradesh. She actively participated in educational reforms, especially for women in Ghazipur.

== Early life ==
Saeeda Faiz was the eldest among her other five sisters and two brothers. Her father, Mohammad Sulaiman Adami and her mother, Mariam Adami were natives of Gorakhpur, Uttar Pradesh. Her father was a freedom fighter and his patriotism made him popular in pre-independent India. Faiz grew up in an Indian society that still held on to discriminatory beliefs regarding female education and freedom. But amidst widespread social prejudices against women education, her parents were determined to provide her best of education.

== Education ==
Saeeda Faiz acquired her higher education in Aligarh Muslim University, Aligarh, Uttar Pradesh and obtained a degree of M.A., B.T.

== Career ==
After completing her education, she worked as a teacher in Government Girls' School, Basti. Later, she served as a lecturer and after that as a Principal in many Government Girls' Inter Colleges of Uttar Pradesh and finally retired as Principal from Government Girls' Inter College, Ghazipur in 1985.

In 1962, Saeeda Faiz was married to Shah Abul Faiz. After marriage, Faiz began her career as a Principal in Government Girls' Inter College, Ghazipur. Shah Abul Faiz hails from Ghazipur. He was highly respected in the city and achieved the position of an M.L.A. in 1974. He had a dream to start a school in the city, but he died in 1984 due to poor health. Faiz decided to fulfill the desire of her husband. She founded a small school beginning from classes L.K.G. to III near her own home, in Mianpura, Ghazipur in 1985. She named the school, Shah Faiz Memorial School, after her husband and later obtained its affiliation from the Central Board of Secondary Education, New Delhi. The school was later renamed to Shah Faiz Public School after its affiliation.

== Honors and awards ==
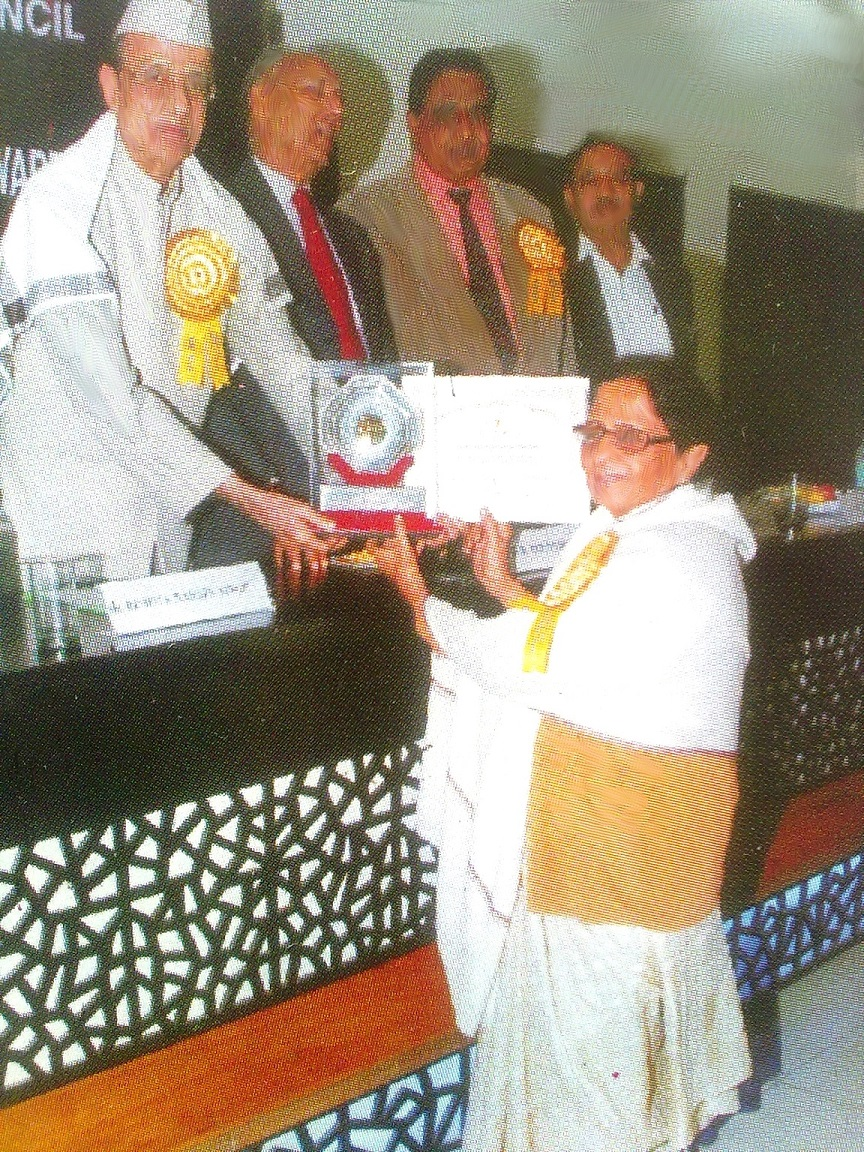
Saeeda Faiz receiving Best Educationalist Award-2009 by National Solidarity Council, New Delhi

Faiz achieved Best Educationalist Award-2009 by National Solidarity Council, New Delhi for the upliftment of the society and encouraging education in Ghazipur.

== Biography ==
A book called Saeeda Faiz - An Inspiration was published in 2010 recording all the works and life of Saeeda Faiz by multiple authors describing her works, inspirations and experiences received from her in their own words. The book was published by Educational Development Forum, Ghazipur in 2010. Dr. Nadeem Adami is the patron of the book. The chief editor of the book is Dr.(Er.) K.P. Tiwari and the editor is Obaidur Rahman Siddiqui. There are six associate editors: Atia Adami, Dr. Meena Adami, Dr. Uma Sharma, Waqim F. Rahman, and Mohammad Saleen.

== See also ==
- Ghazipur
