= Ram Upendra Das =

Indian economist (1967–2024)

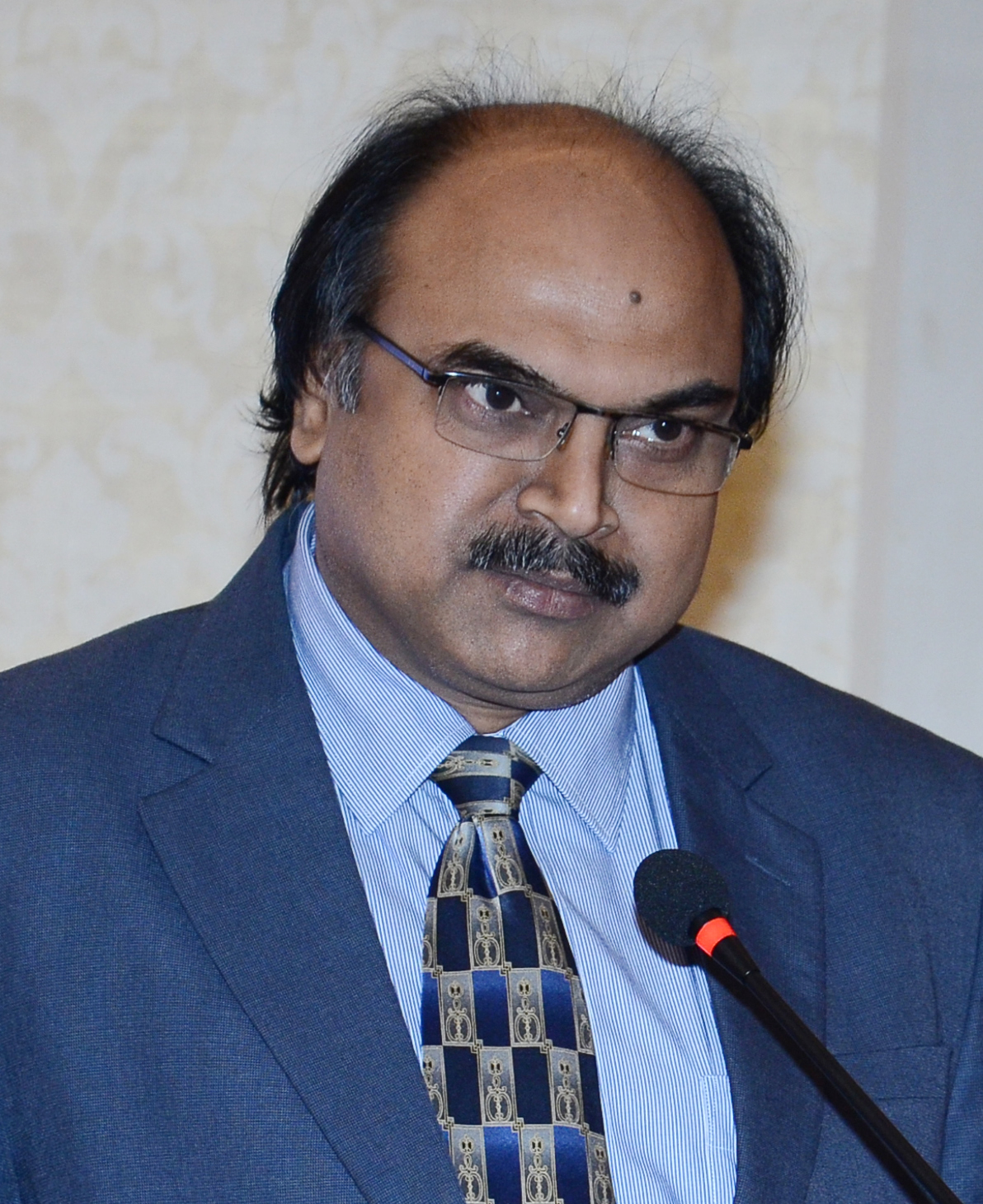
- Born: 18 November 1967 (age 58); Gorakhpur, Uttar Pradesh, India
- Spouse: Anuradha Das

Academic background
- Education: Jawaharlal Nehru University, Gokhale Institute of Politics and Economics, Deen Dayal Upadhyay Gorakhpur University

Academic work
- Discipline: Development economics International economics
- School or tradition: Economist

Ram Upendra Das (born 18 November 1967 – 25 February 2024) was an Indian economist and author. He was appointed as the first Head of the Centre for Regional Trade, a newly established institute of the Department of Commerce, Ministry of Commerce and Industry, Government of India, as a recognition to his valuable contribution to India's economic engagements with different regions and the world. He was until recently professor at think tank Research and Information System for Developing Countries (RIS) in New Delhi. He has served as a member of various high-level expert groups; he contributed towards drafting the SAFTA Treaty and the SAARC Agreement on Trade in Services (SATIS) and India's economic agreements with other countries and regions such as the ASEAN.

== Early life and education ==
He was born in Gorakhpur, eastern Uttar Pradesh, in north India where he received his early education under the guidance of his parents. His father Dr. R.J Das, a scholar, writer and teacher of English literature was also born in Gorakhpur, eastern Uttar Pradesh, in north India, and he retired as a principal of a postgraduate college and his mother S.J. Srivastava, who did masters in Hindi literature, is from Deoria, also in eastern Uttar Pradesh.

He is alumnus of the Jawaharlal Nehru University, New Delhi and the Gokhale Institute of Politics and Economics, Pune. He obtained his PhD (Economics) and M.Phil. (Economics) degrees from the Centre for Economic Studies and Planning, School of Social Sciences, Jawaharlal Nehru University, New Delhi and M.A. (Economics) from Gokhale Institute of Politics and Economics, Pune. He received the National Merit Scholarship (1982); State Inter-Merit Scholarship (1982); National Merit Scholarship (1986).

He was married to Anuradha Das, a singer and media personality.

== Career ==
He drafted the SAFTA and SATIS Agreements, served in the expert group meetings on the subject and conducted the studies on "SAARC Regional Study on Potential for Trade in Services under SAFTA" (2009) and "Development of an Institutional Framework for Data Collection on Trade in Services". This was conducted as a lead consultant of the Asian Development Bank (ADB) for the SAARC Secretariat for Afghanistan, Bangladesh, Bhutan, India, Maldives, Nepal, Pakistan, and Sri Lanka. This work directly contributed to the policy-making of regional economic integration under SAARC monitored by the SAARC Commerce Ministers and Central Bank. He was a member of the Track II Comprehensive Economic Partnership for East Asia (CEPEA) which was adopted at Fourth East Asia Summit by the highest level (Presidents/ Prime Ministers) Heads of States/ Governments of 16 countries including Australia, Brunei, Cambodia, Republic of China, India, Indonesia, Japan, Laos, Malaysia, Myanmar, New Zealand, Philippines, Singapore, Thailand, Vietnam. This led to mega regional grouping viz the Regional Comprehensive Economic Partnership (RCEP) among the 16 Countries. He also contributed to the report between India and Thailand on "A Feasibility Study on a Free Trade Agreement between India and Thailand". He has been panelist at various international business ties. He is involved in various fields of regional and global economic issues including exchange rate, South Asian economic integration, WTO, G20, India-Asean, Trade in Services, India-Japan and India-Pakistan. In 2015 he put forth a new framework of regional economic integration for 'peace-creating prosperity' which was presented at the United Nations Headquarters in New York City

== Achievements and honors ==
He is an alumnus of the Programme Presidential Friends of Indonesia held in 2009. He participated in the International Visitor Leadership Program (IVLP) on US Trade Policy organized by the US Department of State at Washington DC, New York City, Minneapolis, Seattle and Chicago in 2006. In 2005, he received a Certificate of Appreciation from the Minister of Planning and Development, Government of Maldives, for capacity building on macroeconomic forecasting (sponsored by the Commonwealth Secretariat) for the Maldivian Government Officers in Male. He has been Honorary Fellow, Academy for World Watch, Shanghai and Visiting Faculty, Birla Institute of Management Technology, among others. He was recently made a non-resident senior fellow at the Hazar Strategy Institute, Istanbul.

== Selected works ==
He has published numerous books and papers relevant to policy-discourse.

=== Books and reports ===
- 2016, Enhancing India-Myanmar Border Trade: Policy and Implementation Measures, Ministry of Commerce and Industry, Government of India and RIS
- 2015, India's Strategy for Economic Integration with CLMV. Department of Commerce, Ministry of Commerce and Industry, Government of India, 2015.
- 2012, Regional Trade and Economic Integration: Analytical Insights and Policy Options, New York Singapore: World Scientific (co-authored with Piyadasa Edisuriya and Anoop Swarup).
- 2011, Perspectives on Rules of Origin, UK: Palgrave-Macmillan (co-authored with R S Ratna)
- 2009, Potential for Trade in Services under SAFTA Agreement New Delhi: RIS. (co-authored with Nagesh Kumar and Prabir De)
- 2005, Trade, Technology and Growth: On Analysis and Policies for Developing Countries, New Delhi: Bookwell

==== Papers ====
- 2014, Ram Upendra Das, 'Mechanics of intra-industry trade and FTA implications for India' Economic policy Forum'
- 2013, Ram Upendra Das, 'Economic Integration in the "HEART OF ASIA"South Asia-Central Asia linkages
- 2012, Ram Upendra Das, 'Regional Economic Integration in Central Asia' for ESCAP
- 2012, 'Impact of trade and investment liberalization on productivity in organized manufacturing in India', Shujiro Urata, Hee Hahn Chin, Dionisius Narjoko (eds.), Economic Consequences of Globalization: Evidence from East Asia, April, New York and UK: Routledge.
- 2011, Regional Integration and Cooperation in Asia—An Indian Perspective, Global Journal of Emerging Market Economies, Vol. 3 No. 3. Los Angeles, London, New Delhi and Washington DC: SAGE
- 2011, 'Regional Trade-FDI- Poverty Alleviation Linkages – Some Analytical and Empirical Explorations' in Ulrich Volz (ed.) (2011), Regional Integration, Economic Development and Global Governance, USA and UK: Edward Elgar
- 2009, "Imperatives of Regional Economic Integration in Asia in the Context of Developmental Asymmetries: Some Policy Suggestions." ADBI Working Paper 172, Tokyo: ADBI
