= Ramgarh Tal Lake =

Lake in Gorakhpur, Uttar Pradesh, India

- रामगढ़ ताल (Bhojpuri)
- Location within India
- Location: Gorakhpur, Uttar Pradesh, India
- Coordinates: 26°44′N 83°25′E
- Type: lake

Ramgarh Tal is a lake located in Gorakhpur, Uttar Pradesh, India. In 1970, at its largest size, the lake covered an area of 723 hectares (1,790 acres) with a circumference of 18 kilometres (11 mi). Today, it covers about 678 hectares (1,680 acres).

== History ==
According to historian and author Rajbali Pandey, Gorakhpur was called Ramgram in the sixth century B.C. It was in Ramgram where the Kolian Republic was established. During this period, the Rapti River passed through the site of the present-day Ramgarh Tal. However, the direction of the Rapti River was later changed, and Ramgarh Tal came into existence from its remains.

== Development and Maintenance ==
In 1985, Vir Bahadur Singh became Chief Minister and formulated a plan to develop Ramgarh Tal as a tourist center. This plan was later abandoned following his death in 1989.

When Yogi Adityanath took over the role of Chief Minister of Uttar Pradesh in 2017, he unveiled plans to develop the lake into an 'international-level' tourist spot. The UP government also unveiled plans to notify the lake under the Wetland Management Rules.

At present, the NGT (National Green Tribunal) manages upkeep and protection of the lake. Due to the activism of the NGT, construction work has been banned within a radius of 500 meters.

The water quality of Ramgarh Tal Lake has decreased over time due to it being used as a dumping ground for sewage by nearby residential colonies.

"THE MARINE DRIVE OF PURVANCHAL": Due to its latest development and construction of driveway across the lake, it is also being popularized as marine drive along with Nauka Vihar.

The new name is certainly attracting tourists.
