= Tabassum Mansoor =

Indian educationist in Libya

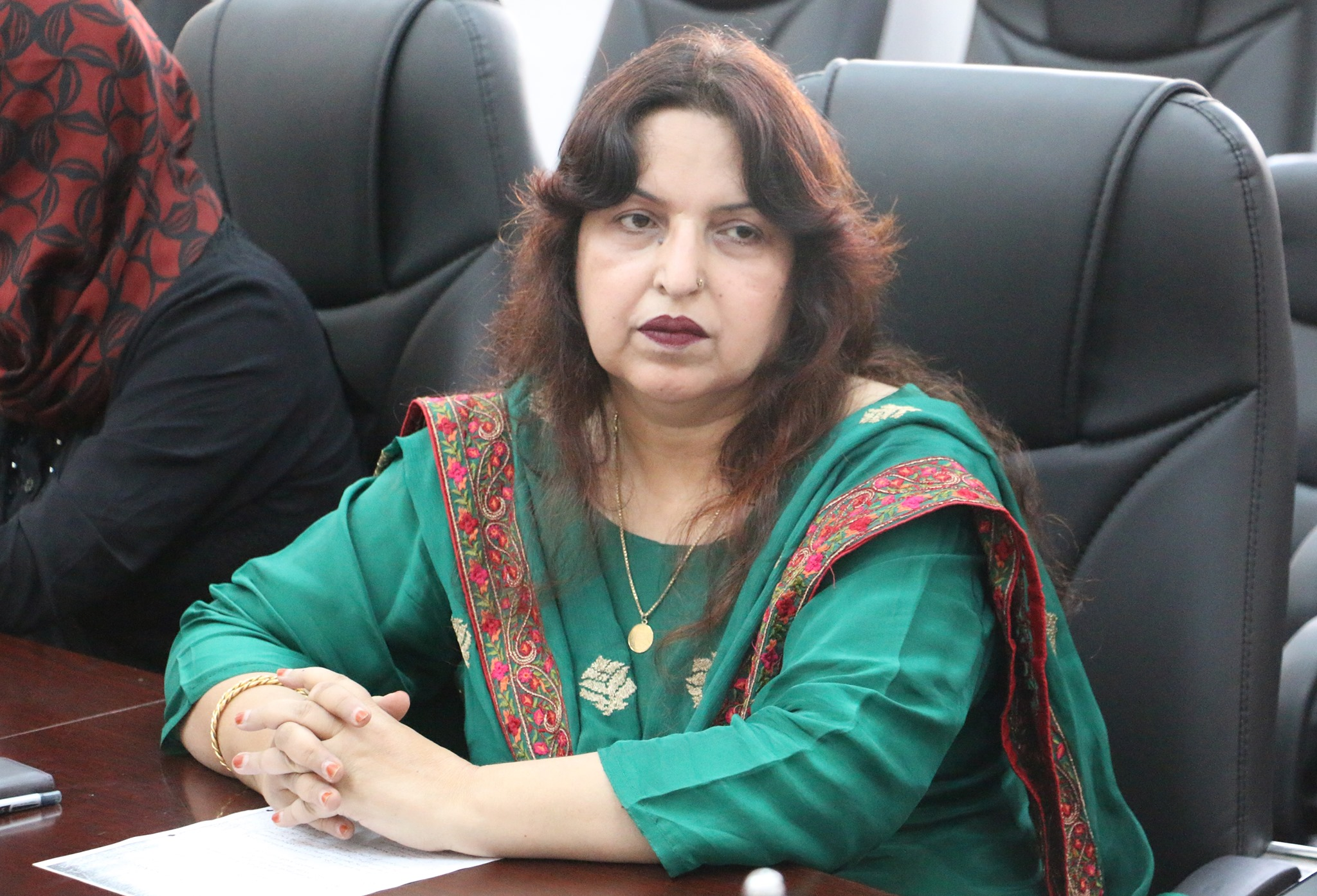
- Born: Gorakhpur, Uttar Pradesh
- Occupation: Educator
- Known for: Indian Entrepreneur

Tabassum Mansoor was born in Gorakhpur, Uttar Pradesh and obtained a Bachelors of Education (B. Ed) from Aligarh Muslim University. Tabassum has been working for over 30 years in the field of primary education and social welfare in Benghazi, Libya. She is the Managing Director and Principal of Indian International School, Benghazi.

In 2011, amid the civil war against Colonel Gaddafi, Tabassum Mansoor was given a critical responsibility by the Indian Embassy in Tripoli of evacuating 3,000 Indians stranded in Benghazi and other parts of eastern Libya. The mission was called Operation Safe Homecoming. This operation was challenging because the situation in Libya was volatile, and in many regions communication services were disrupted. The communication infrastructure, especially in the rebel-controlled areas had collapsed, rendering phone and internet services unavailable. Tabassum mobilized her school buses all across the city and successfully managed to assemble Indians from different parts of Libya in her school and coordinated their safe transfer from Benghazi, Libya to Alexandria, Egypt via MV Scotia Prince Ship. They were then flown home by a special Air India flight from Alexandria.

In 2020, she played an instrumental role in saving seven Indian nationals who were abducted by Libyan militants, and managed their release through back-channel diplomacy. Despite closed borders amid the ongoing crisis in Libya, all seven Indians were sent back on a special UN flight.

== Early life ==
Tabassum completed her education in Gorakhpur, Uttar Pradesh and then graduated from Aligarh Muslim University with a Bachelor of Education She moved to Benghazi, Libya in 1980 and set up the first Indian International School (IIS) there.

== Career ==
Tabassum has lived in Benghazi for over 30 years and has been actively promoting Indian culture and education in Libya. She is known for promoting better understanding of Indian culture and education in Libya. She introduced the CBSE curriculum in Libya in 2002, and since then she has been the managing director and principal of the Indian International School, Benghazi. Tabassum was appointed as an honorary member of the Advisory Committee to restructure Primary Education and improve Teacher Training in Libya.

Tabassum also serves as the Representative of the Embassy of India, Tripoli and Tunis for the Eastern Region of Libya. Since the Libyan turmoil, she managed the welfare, evacuation and repatriation of over 3,000 Indians in 2011, 289 in 2014 and taking care of over 2,000 Indians during the COVID-19 pandemic.

In 2020, she successfully negotiated the high-profile kidnapping case of 7 Indians in Libya, and facilitated the provision of food, medicines, and shelter. In 2021, she was instrumental in the repatriation of 27 Indian workers through local and international resources via IOM (UN).

== Awards ==
In 2017, Tabassum was awarded the Uttar Pradesh Apravasi Bharatiya Ratan Puruskar for her efforts in primary education and social work in Libya. This is an accolade given to honour an ‘exceptional and meritorious contribution’ by a non-resident Indian of Uttar Pradesh origin.

- Apravasi Bhartiya Ratna Samman by Govt. of U.P.
- Outstanding Women in Social Work by Ficci-Flo.
- Principal of the Year Award by Ministry of Education (Recognition for her long-standing commitment to education amid difficult circumstances came from the Libyan authorities when she was inducted as a member of the National Education Council of Libya).
