= Edmund Craigie =

English cricketer and barrister

Personal information
- Full name: Edmund Warren Craigie
- Born: 8 May 1842; Gorakhpur, North-Western Provinces, British India
- Died: 8 June 1907 (aged 65); Putney, London, England
- Batting: Unknown

Domestic team information
- Years: Team
- 1870: Marylebone Cricket Club

Career statistics
| Competition | First-class |
|---|---|
| Matches | 1 |
| Runs scored | 0 |
| Batting average | 0.00 |
| 100s/50s | –/– |
| Top score | 0 |
| Catches/stumpings | –/– |
- Source: Cricinfo, 23 September 2021

Edmund Warren Craigie (8 May 1842 — 8 June 1907) was an English first-class cricketer and barrister.

The son of John Adair Craigie of the Bengal Civil Service, he was born in British India at Gorakhpur. He was educated in England at Harrow School. Craigie joined the British Army in September 1861, when he purchased the rank of cornet in the 2nd Dragoon Guards. He purchased the rank of lieutenant in December 1864, before retiring from active service in May 1870. Craigie became a student at the Inner Temple in April 1870, and in August of the same year he made a single appearance in first-class cricket for the Marylebone Cricket Club (MCC) against Gloucestershire at Lord's. Batting twice in the match, he was dismissed without scoring in the MCC first innings by Robert Miles, while in their second innings following-on he was dismissed by W. G. Grace for the same score. He was called to the bar to practice as a barrister in January 1873. Craigie died at his residence at Putney in June 1907.

His daughter Violet Mary was the first wife of Oscar Wilde's son Vyvyan Holland.
