= Sri Niwas =

Indian geophysicist (1946–2012)

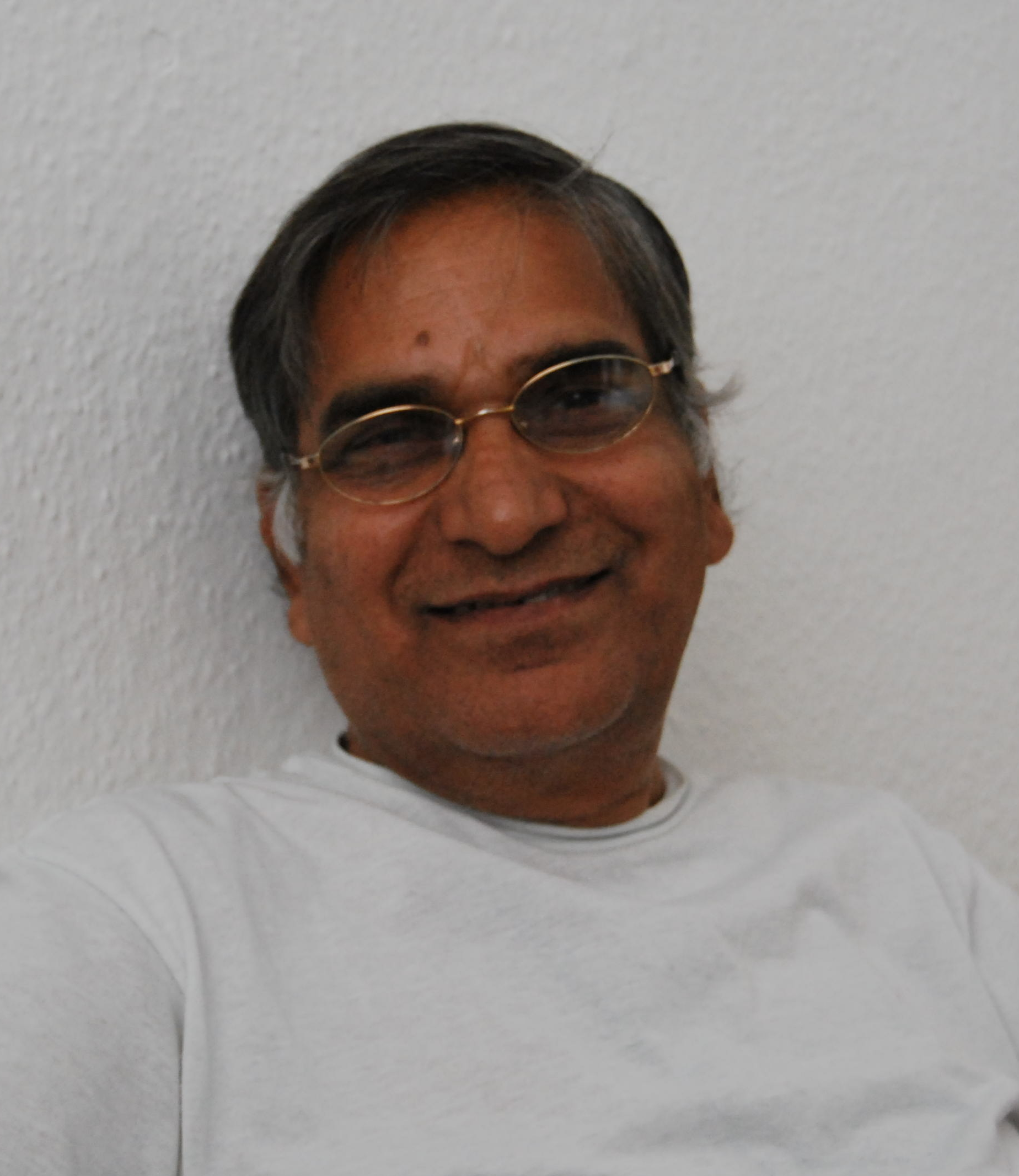
- Sri Niwas, c. 2009
- Born: 1946
- Died: 15 November 2012 (aged 65–66)
- Education: Banaras Hindu University
- Awards: Shanti Swarup Bhatnagar Prize
- Scientific career
- Workplaces: IIT Roorkee

Sri Niwas (1946–2012) was an Indian geophysicist and a professor at the Department of Earth Sciences of the Indian Institute of Technology, Roorkee. He was known for his researches on the Inversion of Geophysical Data. He was an elected fellow of all the three major Indian science academies viz. Indian National Science Academy, Indian Academy of Sciences, National Academy of Sciences, India as well as Indian Geophysical Union and was an elected member of the Association of Exploration Geophysicists. The Council of Scientific and Industrial Research, the apex agency of the Government of India for scientific research, awarded him the Shanti Swarup Bhatnagar Prize for Science and Technology, one of the highest Indian science awards for his contributions to Earth, Atmosphere, Ocean and Planetary Sciences in 1991. (Note: Long link - please select award year to see details)

== Biography ==
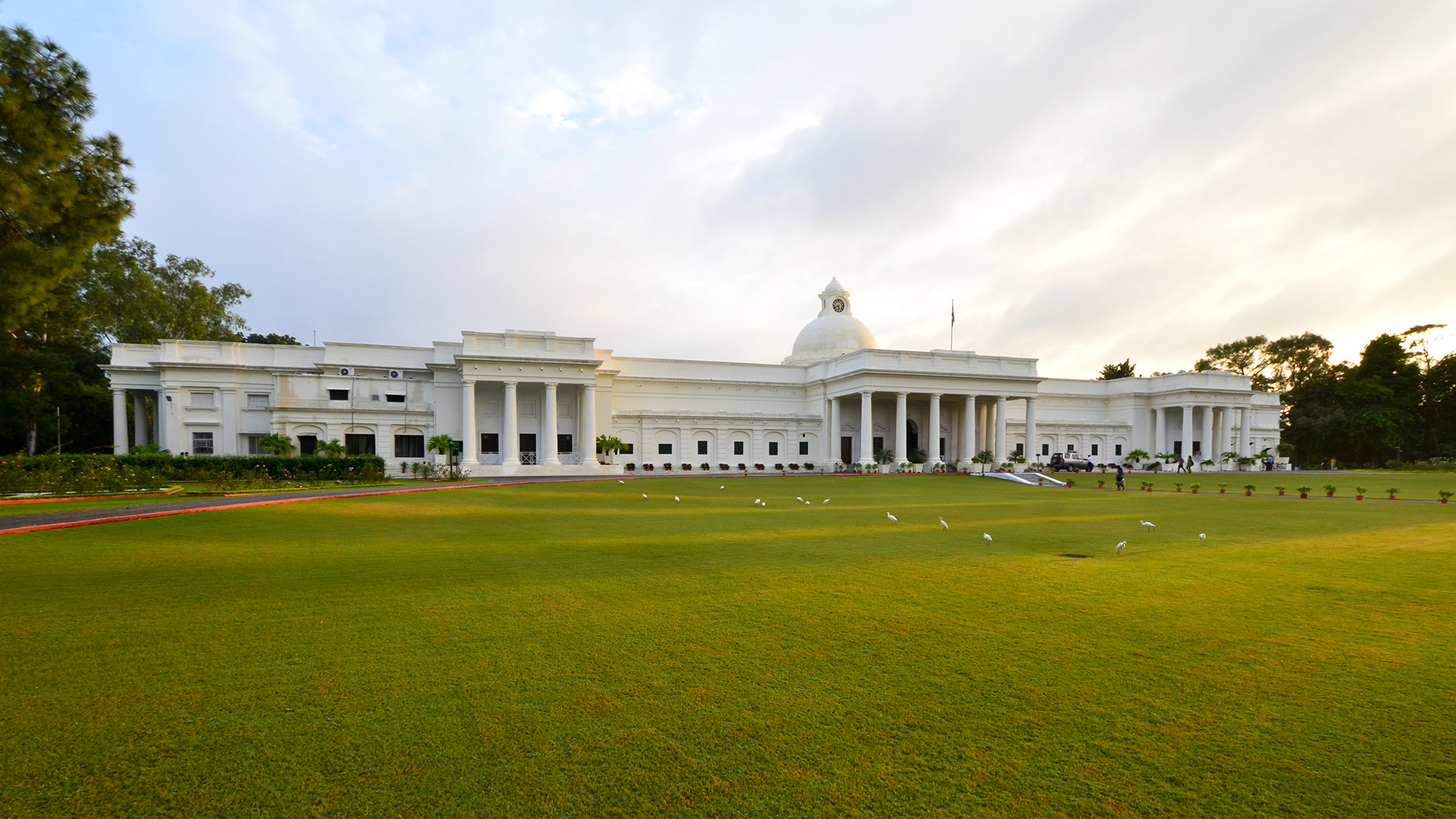
Indian Institute of Technology, Roorkee

Sri Niwas, born on 4 July 1946 in Rakhat village of Gorakhpur district, in the Indian state of Uttar Pradesh to Ram Adhar Pandey, did his early schooling at local schools to complete his intermediate course from Board of High School and Intermediate Education Uttar Pradesh before joining Banaras Hindu University for his college education from where he passed BSc hons degree in 1966 and MSc in geophysics in 1968. He enrolled for doctoral studies at the same university and secured a PhD in 1974 for his thesis, Theoretical treatment of some problems on electrical behavior of layered Earth system. Subsequently, he did his post-doctoral studies at the Indian Institute of Technology, Roorkee (then known as University of Roorkee) and in 1976, joined the institution as a pool officer to start his career. He served out his entire career at IIT Roorkee, holding such positions as a Lecturer (1977–79) and Reader (1980–91) before superannuating in 2011 as a professor. In between, he served as a professor, chair of the Department of Geophysics and joint director of the Summer School of Kurukshetra University from 1989 to 1992 on deputation and as a visiting professor at Federal University of Bahia during 2000–01. Post-retirement, he continued his association with IIT Roorkee as an emeritus professor.

Sri Niwas was married to Shashi Kala and the couple had three children. He died on 15 November 2012, at the age 67.

== Legacy ==
The researches of Niwas were focused on the geophysical problems with regard to their forward and inverse solutions and his pioneering work assisted in the electrical exploration of groundwater in alluvial terrains. He proposed models of system matrix function in terms of exponential functions and designed a methodology using singular value decomposition which is reported to have applications in a variety of geological environments. His studies have been detailed in several peer-reviewed articles; (Note: Please see Selected bibliography section) the online article repository of the Indian Academy of Sciences has listed a number of them. He also guided 12 doctoral and 110 MTech students in their studies. His contributions were reported in the establishment of the Department of Geophysics at Kurukshetra University and he was one of the group of academicians who designed a curriculum in geophysics for IIT Roorkee. He was a life member of the Indian Geological Congress and a member of the faculty of Earth Sciences of the Innovation in Science Pursuit for Inspired Research (INSPIRE) program of the Department of Science and Technology. He was also involved with the Summer School program of the Science and Engineering Research Council (SERC) and was a referee of Proceedings in Earth and Planetary Sciences of the Indian Academy of Sciences.

== Awards and honors ==
The Council of Scientific and Industrial Research awarded him the Shanti Swarup Bhatnagar Prize, one of the highest Indian science awards, in 1991. He was an elected fellow of the Indian National Science Academy, Indian Academy of Sciences, National Academy of Sciences, India and the Indian Geophysical Union and a member of the Association of Exploration Geophysicists.

== Selected bibliography ==
- Sri Niwas, Pravin K. Gupta (2011). "Combined straightforward inversion of resistivity and induced polarization (time-domain) sounding data". Journal of Applied Geophysics. 75 (2) (published October 2011): 319–326. Bibcode:2011JAG....75..319S. doi:10.1016/j.jappgeo.2011.06.024.
- Sri Niwas, Olivar A. L. de Lima (April 2006). "Unified equation for straightforward inversion scheme on vertical electrical sounding data". Geofizika. 23 (1).
- Sri Niwas, Muhammed Celik (2012). "Equation estimation of porosity and hydraulic conductivity of Ruhrtal aquifer in Germany using near surface geophysics". Journal of Applied Geophysics. 84: 77–85. Bibcode:2012JAG....84...77N. doi:10.1016/j.jappgeo.2012.06.001.
- Sri Niwas1, Pravin K. Gupta, O. A. L. de Lima (March 2007). "Nonlinear electrical conductivity response of shaly-sand reservoir". Current Science. 92 (5): 612–617.
- Sri Niwas, S. K. Upadhyay (1974). "Theoretical resistivity sounding results over a transition layer model". Geophysical Prospecting. 22 (2) (published June 1974): 279–296. Bibcode:1974GeopP..22..279N. doi:10.1111/j.1365-2478.1974.tb00086.x.

== See also ==
- Inverse problem
