= World Wetlands Day =

Environmentally related celebration in February

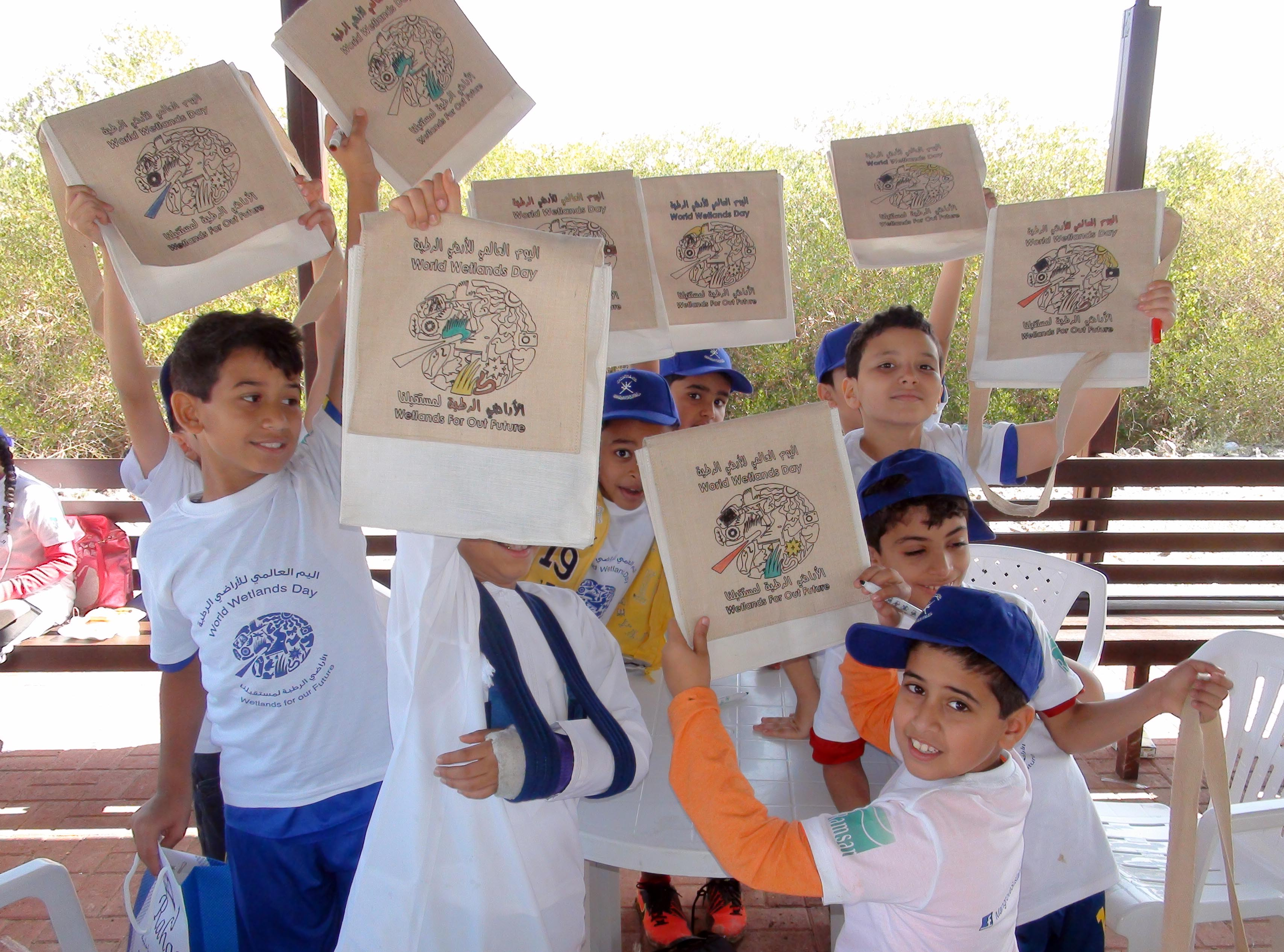
Children celebrating World Wetlands Day

World Wetlands Day is an environmentally related celebration which dates back to the year 1971 when several environmentalists gathered to reaffirm protection and love for wetlands, which are water ecosystems containing plant life and other organisms that bring ecological health in abundance to not only water bodies but environments as a whole. The World Wetlands Secretary Department is originally from Gland, Switzerland. The adoption of the Ramsar convention in the Iranian city of Ramsar occurred on February 2, 1971.

World Wetlands Day is celebrated on the second day of February every year, though it was not celebrated until 1997. This day serves to highlight the influence and positive production that wetlands have had on the world and brings communities together for the benefit of Mother Nature. This day also raises global awareness of wetlands' significant role not only for people but for the planet. Community protectors and environmental enthusiasts all come together on this day to celebrate their love for nature through celebration, which recognises what wetlands have done for not only humans, but all sorts of organisms in the world.

Over time, human construction has led to various ecological problems affecting wetlands. Overpopulation and construction has led to a decrease in environmental conservation. Many wetlands are being lost and ecologists claim that human should recognise the dilemma before a natural filter and conserver of the world is lost.

== Partnership ==
Since 1998, the Ramsar Secretariat has partnered with Danone Group Evian Fund for Water (based out of Paris and founded in Barcelona, Spain) for financial support. For the Ramsar Secretariat, also known as Ramsar Convention on Wetlands of International Importance Especially as Waterfowl Habitat, this financial support has produced a variety of outreach materials including logos, posters, factsheets, handouts and guide documents to support countries' activities organized to celebrate WWD. These materials are available for free download on the World Wetlands Day website in the three languages of the convention: English, French, and Spanish. With that being said, all the materials are also available in their design files for event organizers to customize and adapt them to their local languages and contexts. A few print copies are available to countries upon request to the Secretariat.

== World Wetlands Day Youth Photo Contest ==
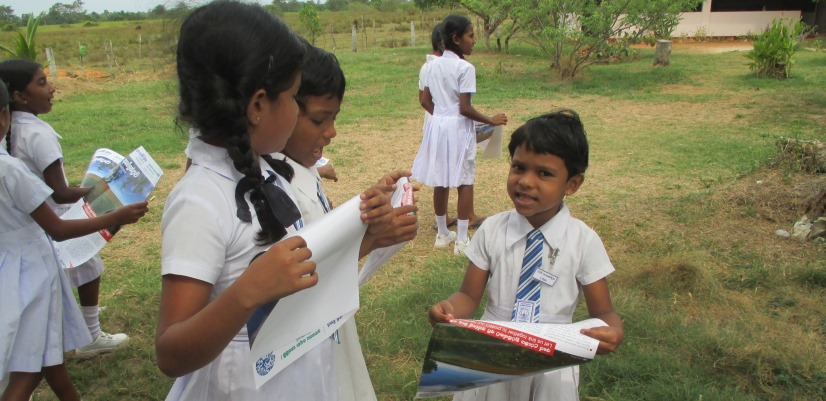
World Wetlands Day celebrations in Sri Lanka

Starting in 2015, a month-long Wetlands Youth Photo Contest that starts on 2 February was introduced as a part of a new approach to target young people and get them involved in WWD. People between ages 15 through 24 can take a picture of a certain wetland and upload it to the World Wetlands Day website between the months of February and March.

Since 1997 the Ramsar website has posted reports from about 100 countries of their WWD activities. In 2016 a map of events was introduced to help countries promote their activities and to facilitate reporting after WWD.
