= K. K. Srivastava =

Indian poet and author

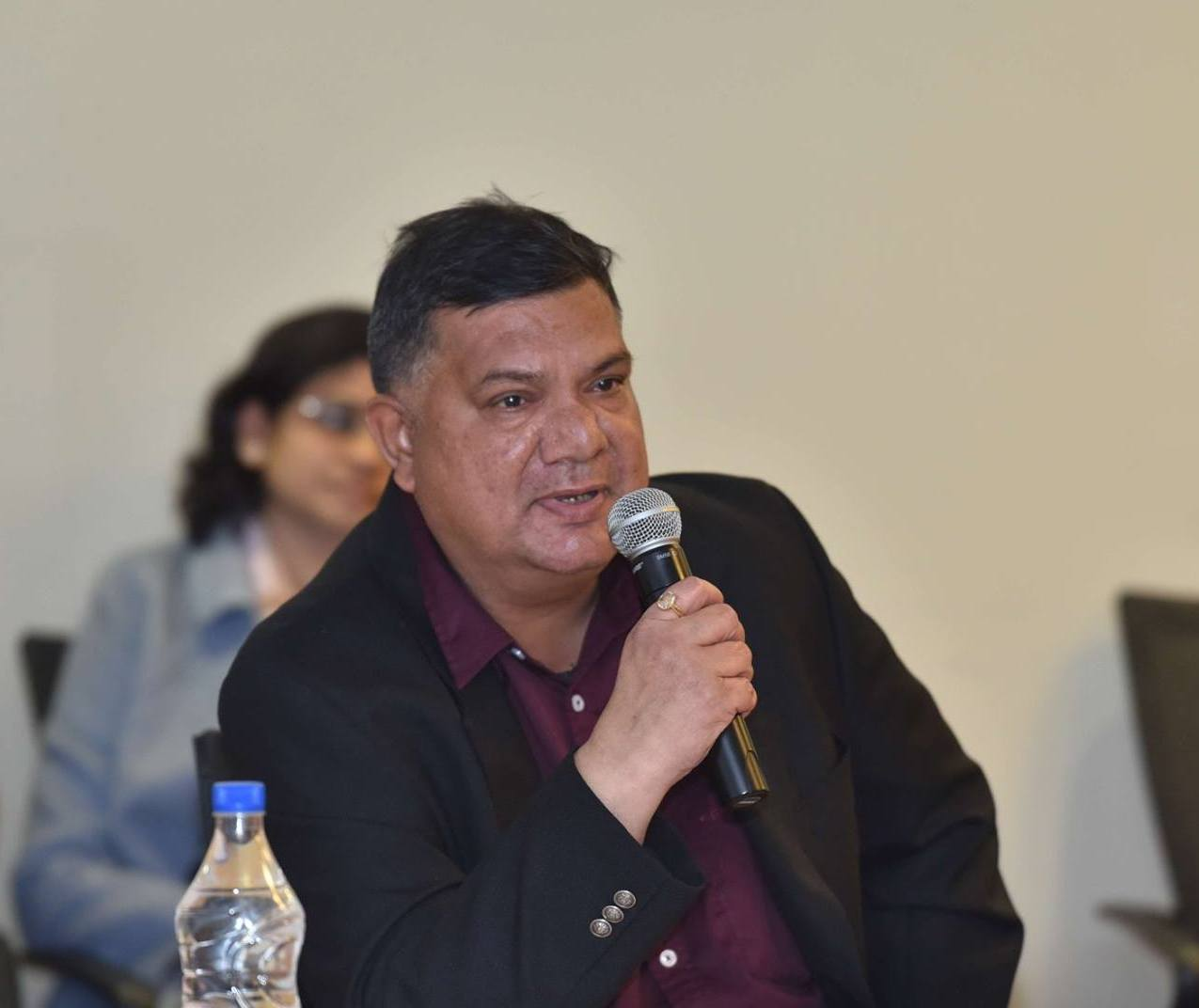
- Srivastava in 2019 addressing teams from Brazil, South Africa and Austria on Setting Government Accounting Standards in Public Secto in World Bank India Center Lodhi Estate, New Delhi
- Born: 1960 (age 65–66)
- Education: MA (Economics)
- Alma mater: Gorakhpur University
- Occupations: Author, former additional deputy comptroller & auditor general in the rank of special secretary to the Indian government
- Known for: Poet, non-fiction, critic, and columnist

Kuldeep Kumar Srivastava (born 1960) is an Indian poet and author. He has written three volumes of poetry and a literary semi-autobiographical non-fiction. Srivastava is the former Additional Deputy Comptroller and Auditor General in the Office of the Comptroller and Auditor General of India, New Delhi.

Currently, he is a member of Institutional Ethics Committee of mental health establishment, Institute of Human Behaviour and Allied Sciences (IHBAS) Govt of NCT, New Delhi. He is also a columnist for The Economic Times.

== Early life and career ==
Srivastava was born in 1960 in Gorakhpur, Uttar Pradesh. He received his master's degree in economics in 1980 from Gorakhpur University and joined Civil Services in 1983. His first poetry book Ineluctable Stillness came in 2005 followed by two more poetry collections and a semi-autobiographical non-fiction.

Srivastava wrote Soliloquy of a Small-Town Uncivil Servant, a literary non-fiction published in March 2019.

Srivastava is known for his incisive book reviews and articles published in The Pioneer, The Daily Star and Kitaab Singapore.

His poems have been translated into Hindi (Andhere Se Nikli Kavitayen—Nardeo Sharma and Jaswinder Singh) (2017) and his book Shadows of the Real was translated into Russian language by veteran Russian poet Adolf Shvedchikov.

As Principal Accountant General, he headed big offices in States like Kerala, Gujarat, Madhya Pradesh, Bihar and Jharkhand.

== Bibliography ==
- Shadow of the Real. Rupa, 2012. 160 pages. ISBN 978-81-291-2011-3.
  - Shadow of the Real. 2017. 116 pages. Translated into Russian by the Russian poet Adolf Shvedchikov
- Ineluctable Stillness (A Collection of Poems). 2005. ISBN 8173137277.
- An Armless Hand Writes.
- Soliloquy of a Small-Town Uncivil Servant. 2019. 208 pages. ISBN 9353040833.
- The Descent: Essays and Critiques (2010–2021), p. 182, ASIN:B09QJL23G4
