= Markandeya Hill =

Markandeya Hill is near the town of Vokkaleri in Kolar District of Karnataka State. It is named after the sage Markandeya. There is a temple and also a reservoir of the same name in Kolar District. The hill is surrounded by thick forests and has a reservoir. The deity at this temple is Lord Shiva in form of Markandeshwara.

The Markandeshwara temple atop the hill has a 15th-century Ganga monument. Other idols include Bhairaveshwara and, Nandeeshwara Nandi.
