= Ravindra Singh (politician) =

Indian politician

Member of the Legislative Assembly of Uttar Pradesh
- In office 1977–1979
- Constituency: Kauriram, Gorakhpur

Personal details
- Died: 27 August 1979 Gorakhpur Junction railway station, Uttar Pradesh
- Party: Janata Party
- Education: St. Andrew's College; Gorakhpur University; University of Lucknow
- Occupation: Politician

Ravindra Singh was an Indian politician from Uttar Pradesh who served as a Member of the Legislative Assembly of Uttar Pradesh in 1977. He had also been the student union president at Gorakhpur University and the University of Lucknow.

== Political career ==
Ravindra Singh was from a village in Gorakhpur. He served as General Secretary of the Student Union at St. Andrew's College, Gorakhpur and later became its president. In 1967, while pursuing his MA at Gorakhpur University, he was elected President of the Students Union. He continued his studies at University of Lucknow and became the Student Union President there in 1972.

In 1977, he was elected MLA from the Kauriram constituency of Gorakhpur district on a Janata Party ticket. Despite being an MLA from the ruling party, he criticised the government. He considered student unions, labour organisations and employee organisations as essential training grounds for politics.

== Murder ==
On 27 August 1979, he was shot at Gorakhpur Junction railway station while traveling to Lucknow for an assembly session. He died from his injuries three days later, at the age of 35.
