= Malmaliya =

Village in Bihar, India

Coordinates: 26.1648°N 84.6767°E

Malmaliya is a small village town in near Bashantpur, Siwan district, Bihar, India. It belongs to Kauriya panchayat.

This town has a temple of Hanuman named "Hanuman Gandhi Mandir". And A railway station named basantpur station which connect to Mashrakh and Siwan and the railway station is planned, very close to Hanuman Mandir at the confluence of two highways flyover bridge.

Malmaliya has a bus station where passengers can get buses to elsewhere in Bihar as well as other major cities like Delhi, Lucknow, Gorakhpur, Varanasi, Ranchi, Jaipur, Surat, Kolkata, or Siliguri. It is a crowded place, known for exporting mango and banana. Uttar Bihar Gramin Bank is the area's main bank.
