= Markandey Chand =

Indian politician

Markandey Chand is an Indian politician. He was elected to the Uttar Pradesh Legislative Assembly from Dhuriapar in the 1980, 1989, 1991 and 1996 elections as a member of the Bharatiya Janata Party. He is a minister in the Mayawati government as well as Minister of Minor Irrigation and Rural Engineering in Rajnath Singh ministry.
