= Kuzhanthai Velappar temple =

Hindu temple

Kuzhanthai Velappar Temple
- Poombarai Kodaikanal Temple
- Location in Tamil Nadu, India

Religion
- Affiliation: Hinduism
- District: Dindigul
- Deity: Murugan

Location
- Location: Kodaikanal
- State: Tamil Nadu
- Country: India
- Interactive map of Kuzhanthai Velappar Temple
- Coordinates: 10°15′23″N 77°24′26″E

Architecture
- Type: Tamil architecture

Website
- www.poombaraimurugan.org

Kuzhanthai Velappar Temple is a Hindu temple in the village of Poombarai near Kodaikanal in Dindigul.

Around 10 to 12 centuries after returning from China, Bogar completed the Palani Andavar statue. He built one more Navabasanam Statue at the midpoint of the Palani and Poombari Western gates. Nowadays, its location is referred to as the Yanai Gejam (Bogar Forest), as per inscriptions in the temple which temple has built by king of the Chera dynasty.

== Legend ==
=== Poombarai Kuzhanthai Velappar Temple ===
Kulanthai Velappar temple is situated in the village of Poombarai near Kodaikanal in Dindigul. There is a song/poem (Poombarai Velan) by Sage Arunagiri Nathar. It was Murugan who saved Arunagiri Nathar from a demon by taking the form of a child. Hence the main deity of this temple is called Kuzhanthai Velappar. The temple was built by a Chera King as per the inscription. After completing the Palani Andavar statue, Bogar built one more navabasanam (amalgam of nine poisons) idol at this place between Palani and Poombarai. This place is also called as Yanai Gejam (Bogar kadu).

There are also some people who believe this idol is made up of dasaphasanam (amalgam of ten poisons). A shrine to Sithar Bogar is present in the southwestern corridor of the temple.

== History ==
The idol of Muruga in Poombarai, was created and consecrated by sage Bogar, one of the eighteen great siddhas out of an amalgam of nine poisons or navapashanam. The legend also holds that the sculptor had to work very rapidly to complete its features, but that he spent so much time in creating the face, he did not have time to bestow but a rough grace upon the rest of the body, thus explaining the contrast between the artistic perfection of the face and the slightly less accomplished work upon the body. A shrine to Bogar exists in the southwestern corridor of the temple, which, by legend, is said to be connected by a tunnel to a cave in the heart of the hill, where Bogar continues to meditate and maintain his vigil, with eight idols of Muruga.

The deity, after centuries of worship, fell into neglect and was engulfed by the forest. One night, Perumal a king of the Chera Dynasty, who controlled the area between the second and fifth centuries A.D., wandered from his hunting party and was forced to take refuge at the foot of the hill. It so befell, that Murugan, appeared to him in a dream, and ordered him to restore the idol to its former state. The king commenced a search for the idol, and finding it, constructed the temple that now houses it, and re-instituted its worship.

== Architecture ==
The idol of the deity is said to be made of an amalgam of nine poisonous substances which forms an eternal medicine when mixed in a certain ratio. It is placed upon a pedestal of stone, with an archway framing it and represents the god Kuzhanthai Velappar in the form he assumed at Poombarai - that of a very young recluse, shorn of his locks and all his finery.

The temple is built in a typical South India temple architectural style. There is no tower. The sanctum sanctorum faces towards the east direction. The main idol, Kulandai Velappan is present in the standing posture in the sanctum sanctorum. His mount (vahanam) peacock is found near the Bali peetham and flag staff facing towards the main shrine.

There is a sub-shrine where the metal Utsava idols of Ganesha and Subramanya with his consorts are placed. It is found near the sanctum sanctorum.

The wall around the main shrine has Nataraja and Dattatreya as the Koshta idols. It is very rare to find Nataraja and Dattatreya in the form of carvings as the Koshta idols. Moreover, it is also rare to find the carving or idol of Dattatreya. The temple also houses many sub-shrines of various deities such as Shiva Linga, Ganesha, Navagraha, Bhairava, Idumban, Dakshinamurti and Nagas.

The sanctum of the temple is of early Chera architecture.

== Religious practices ==
One of the main traditions of the temple, is the tonsuring of devotees, who vow to discard their hair in imitation of the Lord of Poombarai. Another is the anointing of the head of the presiding deity's idol with sandalwood paste, at night, prior to the temple being closed for the day. The paste, upon being allowed to stay overnight, is said to acquire medicinal properties, and is much sought after and distributed to devotees, as rakkāla chandaṇam.

== Festivals and religious practises ==
Every year, Poombarai celebrates Ther Thiruvizha (car festival) for Lord Muruga. It falls on Kettai nakshatra which comes after Thai Poosam. Normally it comes in Thai or Maasi month.

== Religious importance ==
There is a song-poem (Poombarai Velan) by Arunagirinathar who lived during the 15th century. While visiting this temple this god (Murugan) had saved Arunagirinathar from a devil by acting as a baby (Kulanthai). As a result of this incident only Poombarai Murugan has been called as Kuzhanthai Velappar. Also, some others trust that this idol is made up of dasaphasanam which is ten different herbals. It is also said that this abhishegam cures a lot of diseases like cancer and sugar (diabetes). More scientifically, 'Siddhar' lived around western-gates so this temple location is also the middle of western-gates only so we can confirm the stories of Bogar idols.
