= Muppu =

Muppu is a mineral extract used in Siddha medicine. Typical muppu is prepared using three different salts collected from southern Tamil Nadu, as described by palm leaf literature. Medicinal muppu can be prepared using sodium carbonate, rock salt, and potassium nitrate. Some types of muppu extract include vaidya muppu, vada muppu, and yoga muppu. Vada muppu is used in south Indian alchemy and yoga muppu is used as an aspirant.

Muppu is said to be important in both yoga and alchemy. Siddhars may also use it in the preparation of medicine. Muppu is said to be capable of rejuvenating the human system, as well as transmutating base metals into gold.
