= Maruthamalai Marudhachalamurthy Temple =

Hindu temple in Coimbatore, Tamil Nadu, India

Arulmigu Subramaniya Swamy Thirukovil, Marudhamalai
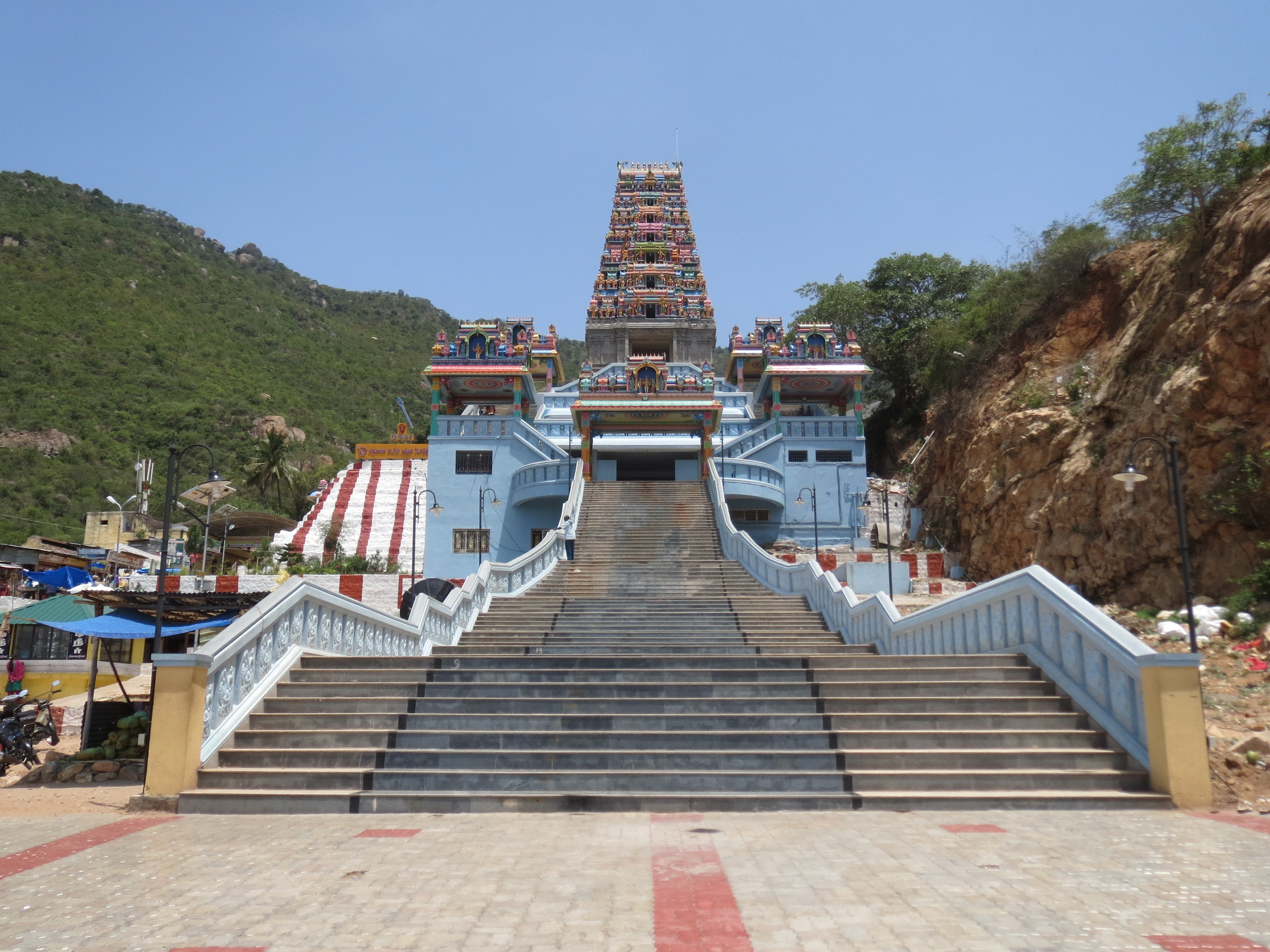

- Location in Tamil Nadu Location in India

Religion
- Affiliation: Hinduism
- Deity: Murugan

Location
- Location: Coimbatore
- State: Tamil Nadu
- Country: India
- Coordinates: 11°2′46″N 76°51′7″E

Architecture
- Type: Tamil Architecture
- Completed: 12th century

Website
- [www.marudhamalaimurugan.hrce.tn.gov.in]

The Marudhamalai Murugan Temple, or the Maruthamalai Marudhachalamurthy Temple, is a 12th-century hill temple situated in Coimbatore, Tamil Nadu, India. Built by Tamil kings during the Sangam period as indicated in the Purananuru, the temple is dedicated to Murugan, a form of Kartikeya. It is traditionally regarded to be the seventh in the list of the Six Abodes of Murugan.

Like most Murugan temples, the temple is situated upon a hill, part of the Western Ghats about 12 km west from the centre of the city of Coimbatore. Thaipusam and other festivals dedicated to the deity are celebrated here. On many evenings, devotees gather for a procession of Murugan sitting in a chariot (ratha yatra) and encircle the temple.

The temple is maintained and administered by the Hindu Religious and Charitable Endowments Department of the Government of Tamil Nadu.

== Etymology ==
The name Marudhamalai refers to the 600 ft (180 m) tall granite hill on which the temple stands and is derived from the native tree called marudham or marudha maram (Terminalia arjuna, also known as the Arjuna tree) which grows there, and malai, meaning hill or mountain in Tamil. This Murugan temple is special since it is on the east face on the hill, unlike other Murugan temples on the hills.

=== Marudhamalai Adivaram ===
Marudhamalai, or Marudhamalai Adivaram (meaning "at the foot of Maradhumalai"), is also the name of the locality to the east of the hill and the temple. It forms part of the 17th ward of Coimbatore Corporation.

== Site ==
The presiding deity is addressed by multiple names, such as Marudhamalai Andavar, Marudachalapathi and Dhandayuthanpani. There are springs or pools of sacred water (theertham) around the temple, namely Maruda Theertham and Skanda Theertham, which are believed to possess medicinal properties.

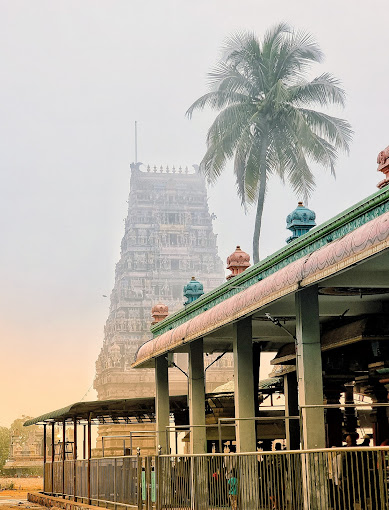
Marudhamalai temple

== Pambatti Siddhar ==
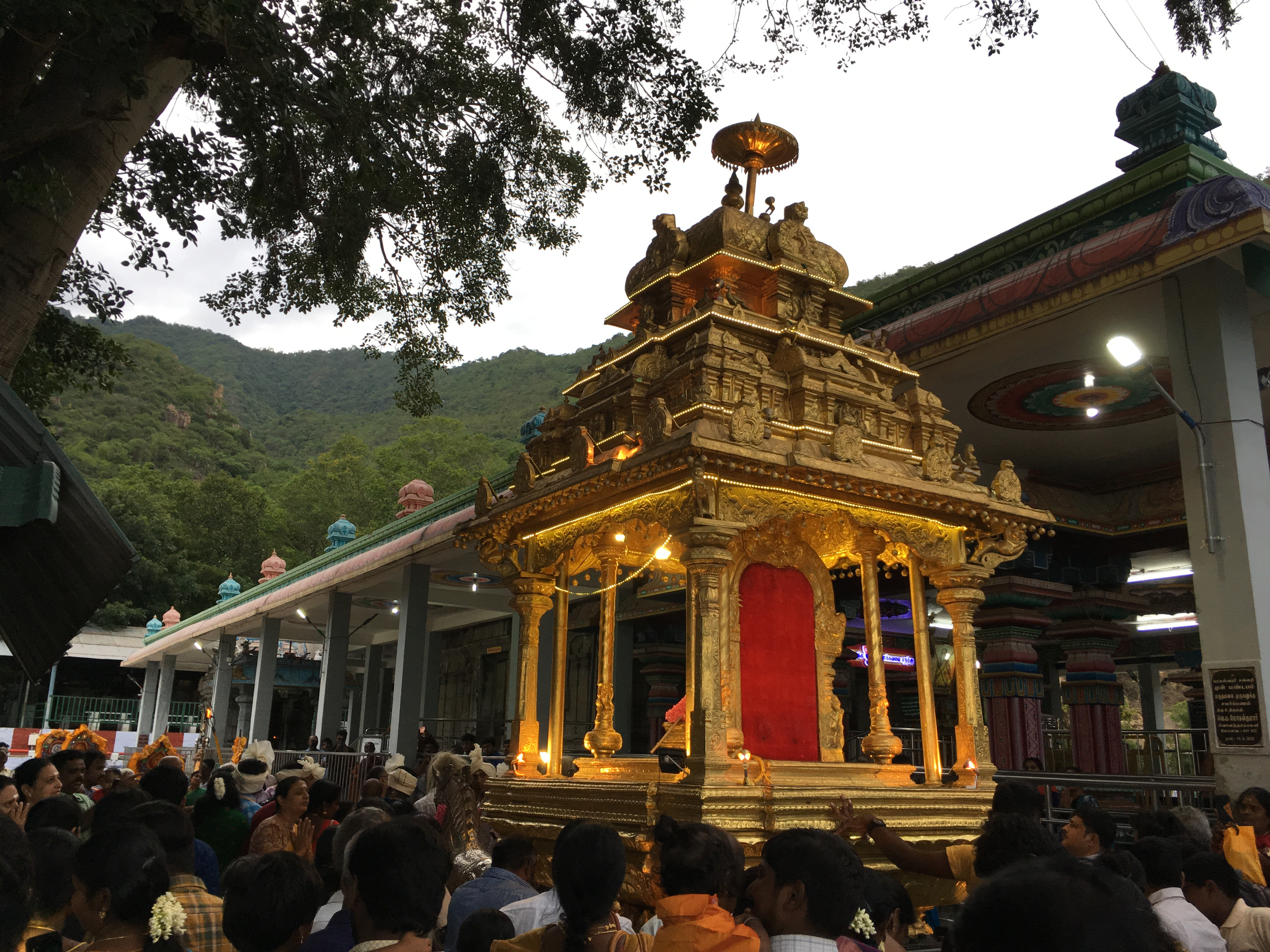
Maruthamalai deity in a car procession

In the southern end of the temple, the prahara staircase to the Pambatti Siddhar cave is located. Pambatti Siddhar was one of the 18 Siddhars, a group of Tamil sages, and lived during the 12th century. He is regarded to have performed penance on the Maruthamalai hill. According to legend, Murugan appeared as a snake to him, and to have appeared again later along with his consorts Valli and Devasena, and is said to have given Siddhar the Marutha Tirtham and blessed him. A connecting tunnel route from Murugan's sanctum sanctorum and Siddhar's cave was formed, which the Siddhar is believed to have used to worship the deity.

== Gallery ==
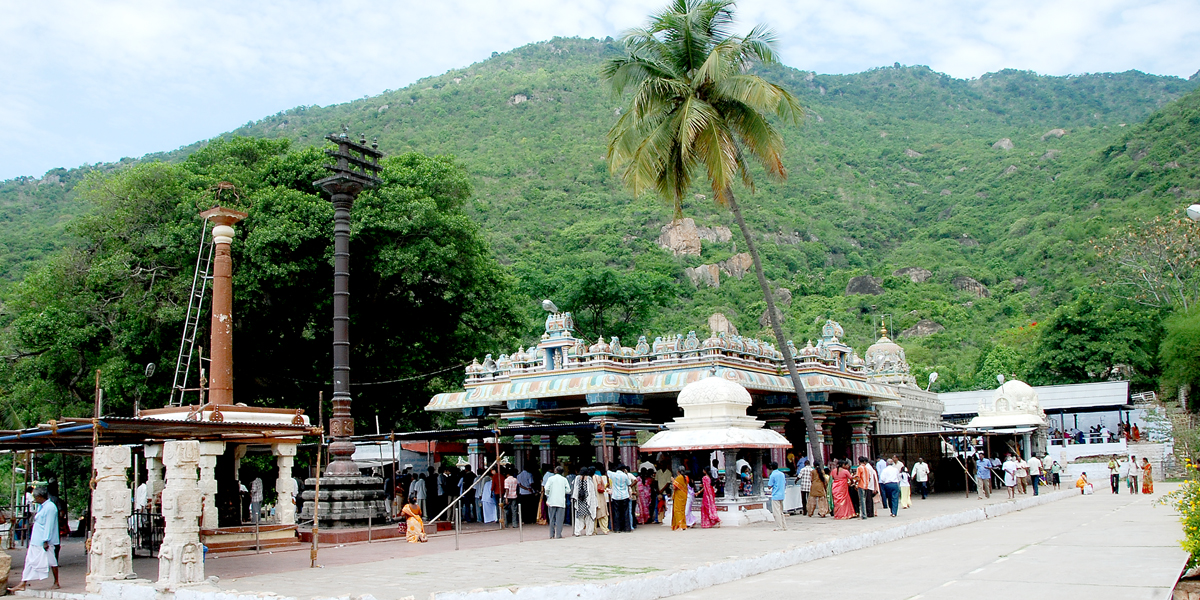
Maruthamalai temple

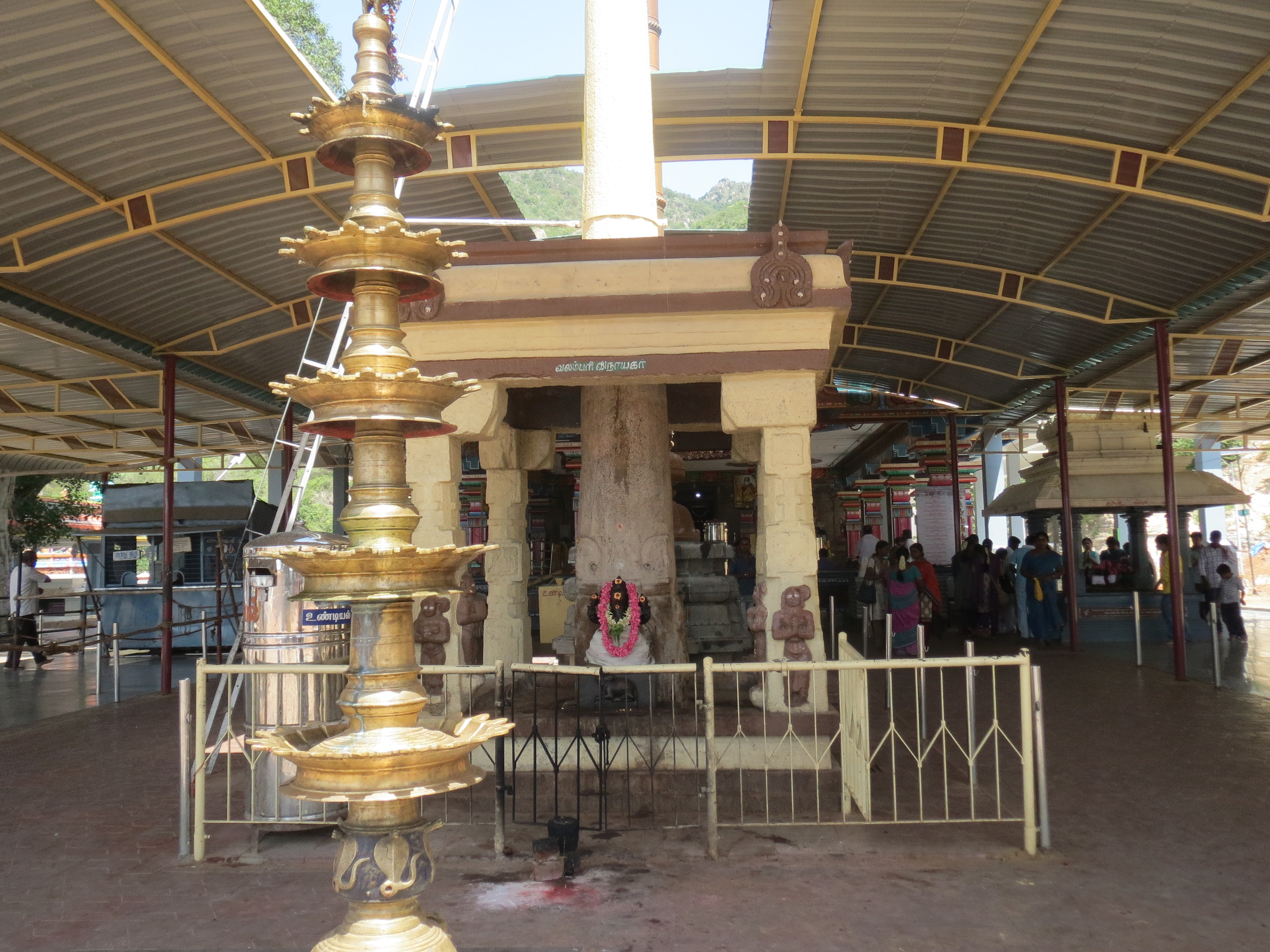
Valampuri Vinayakar on the stone pillar

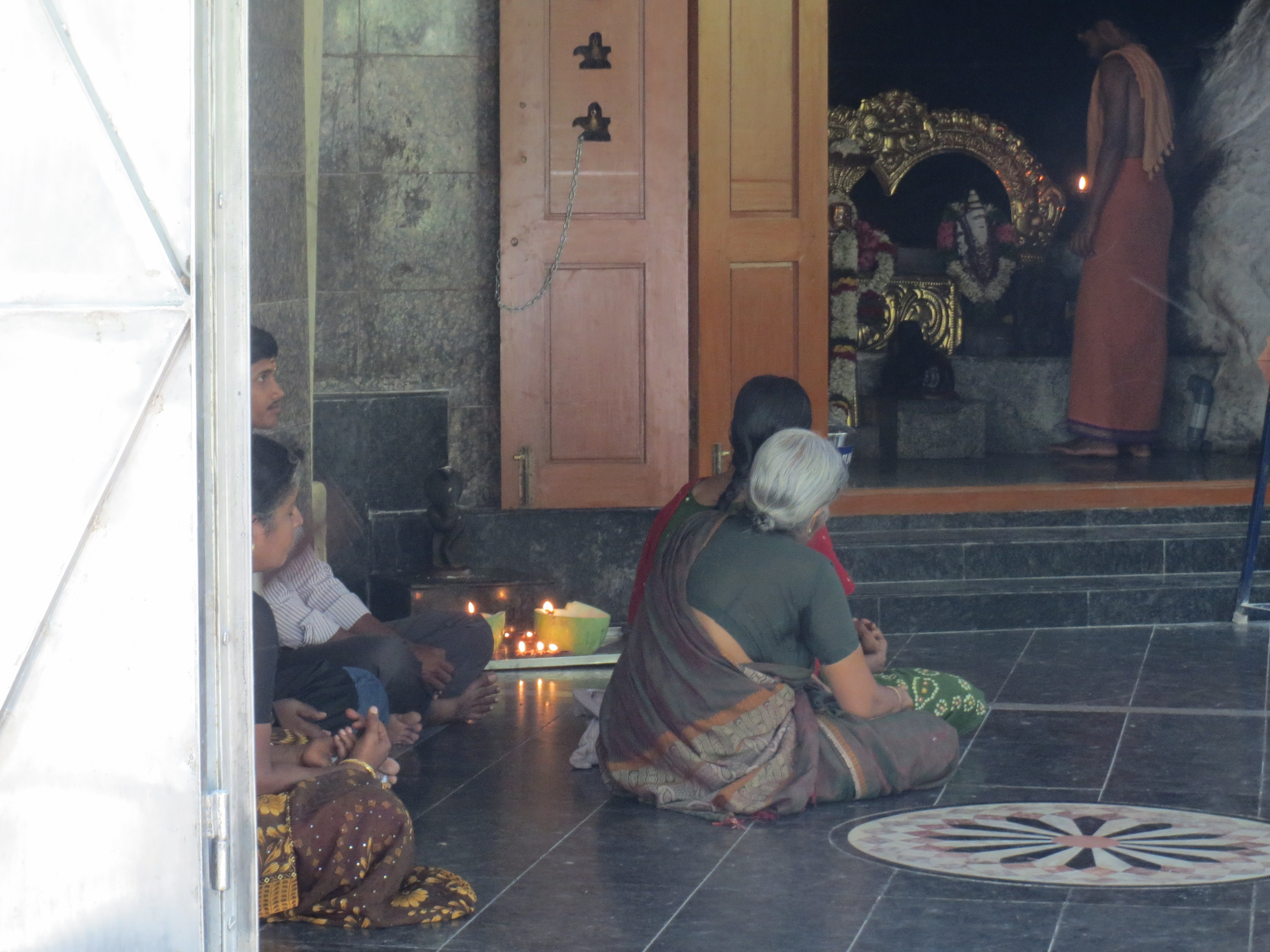
Pambatti Sitthar Shrine

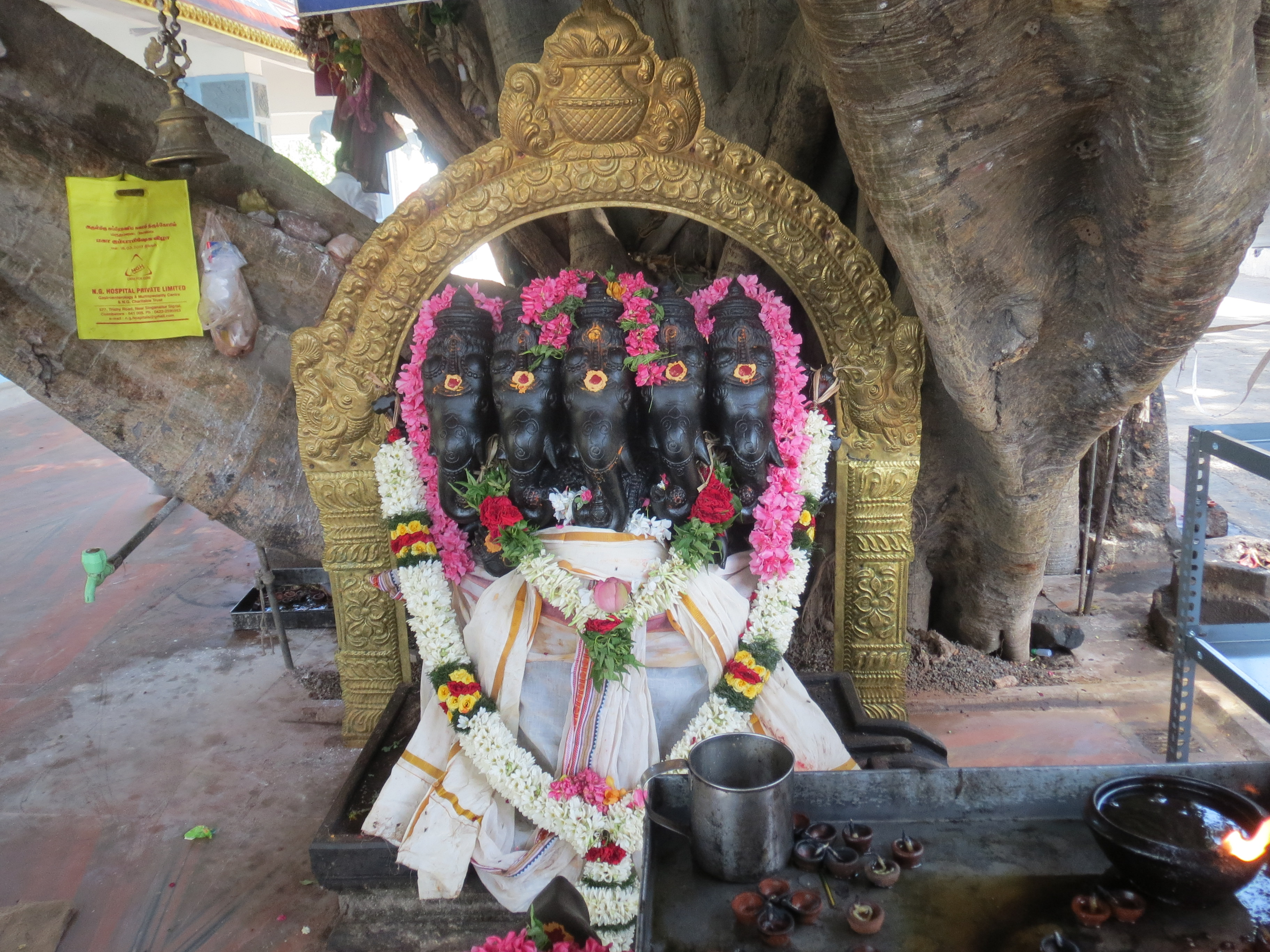
Pancha Vriksha Vinayakar

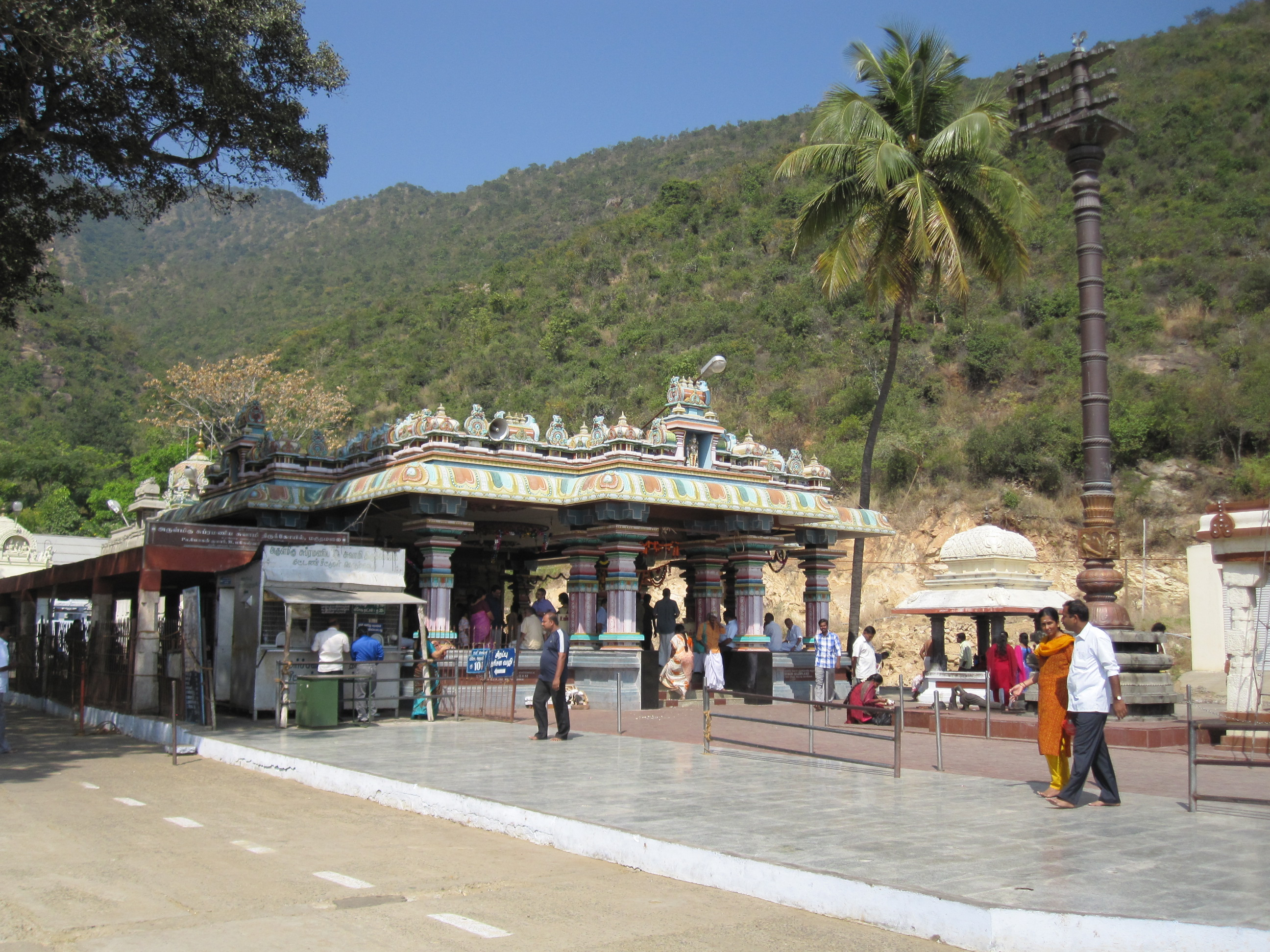
Front view of the temple (before renovation)

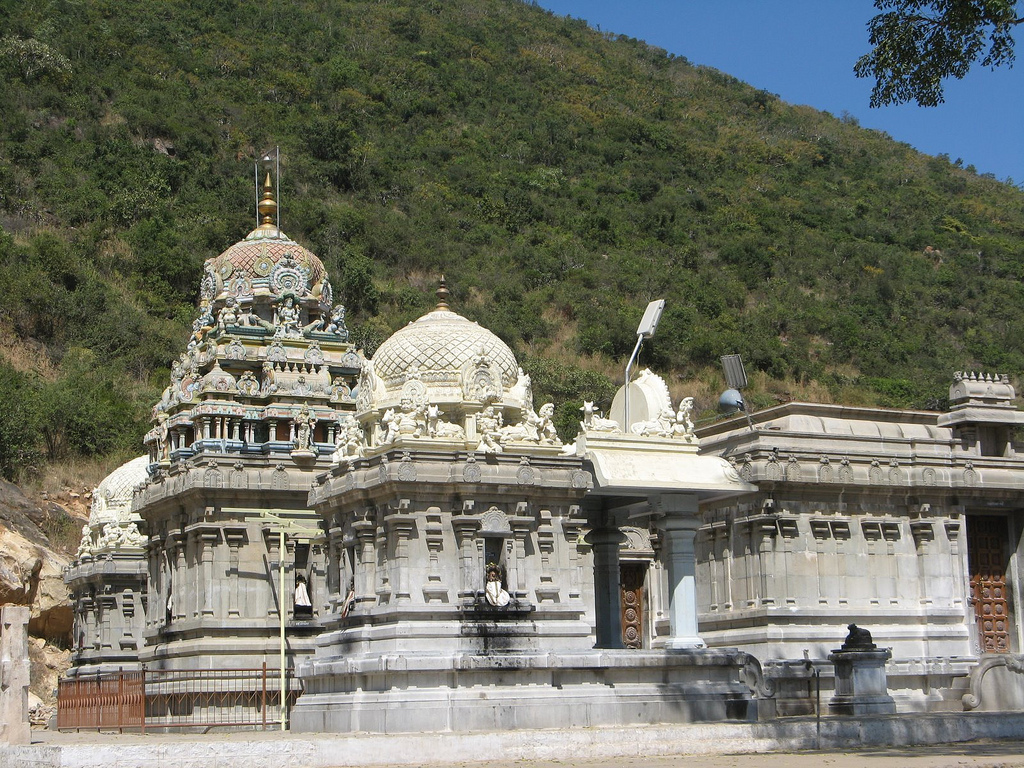
Side view of the temple

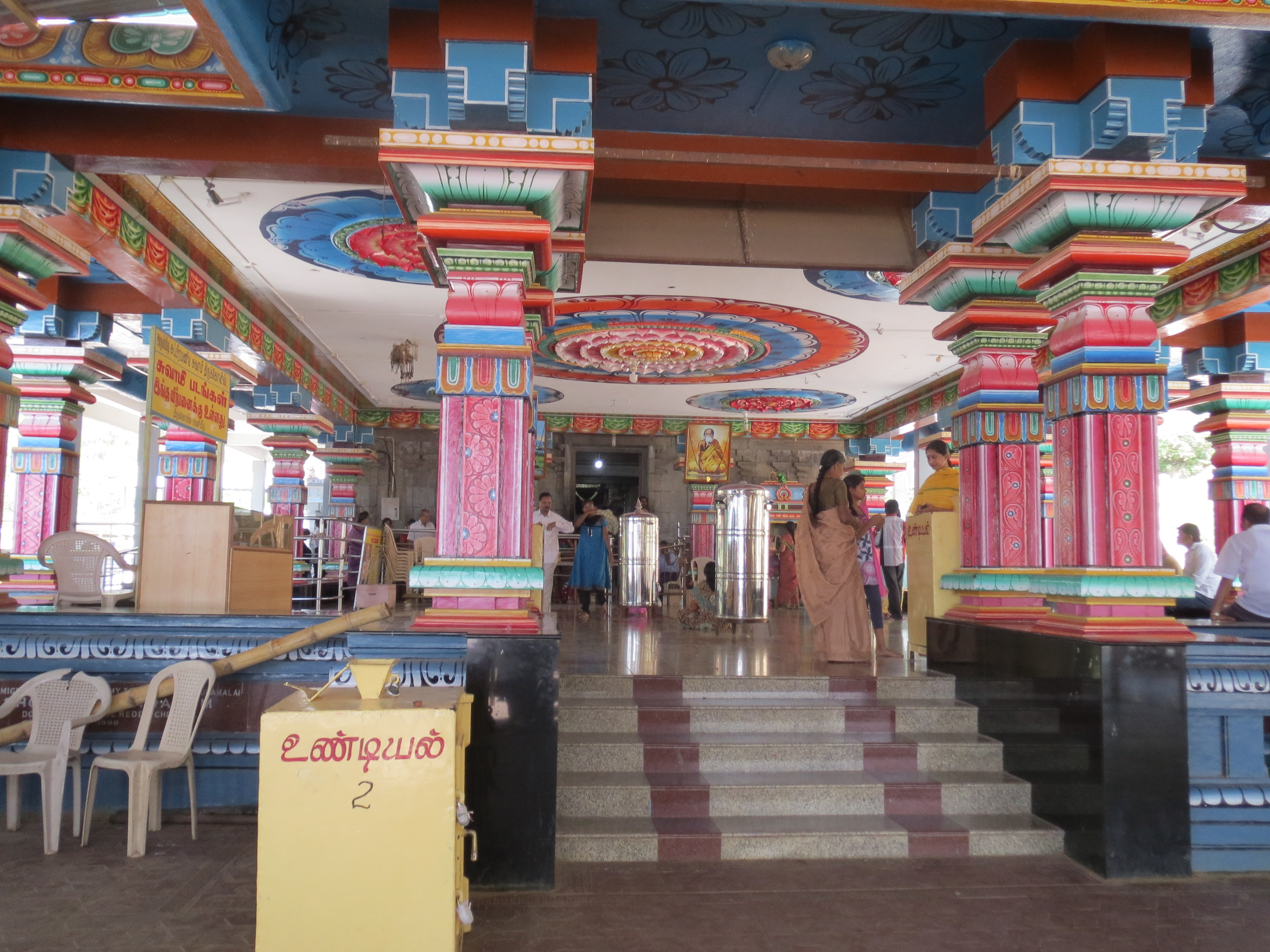
Front gallery of the temple

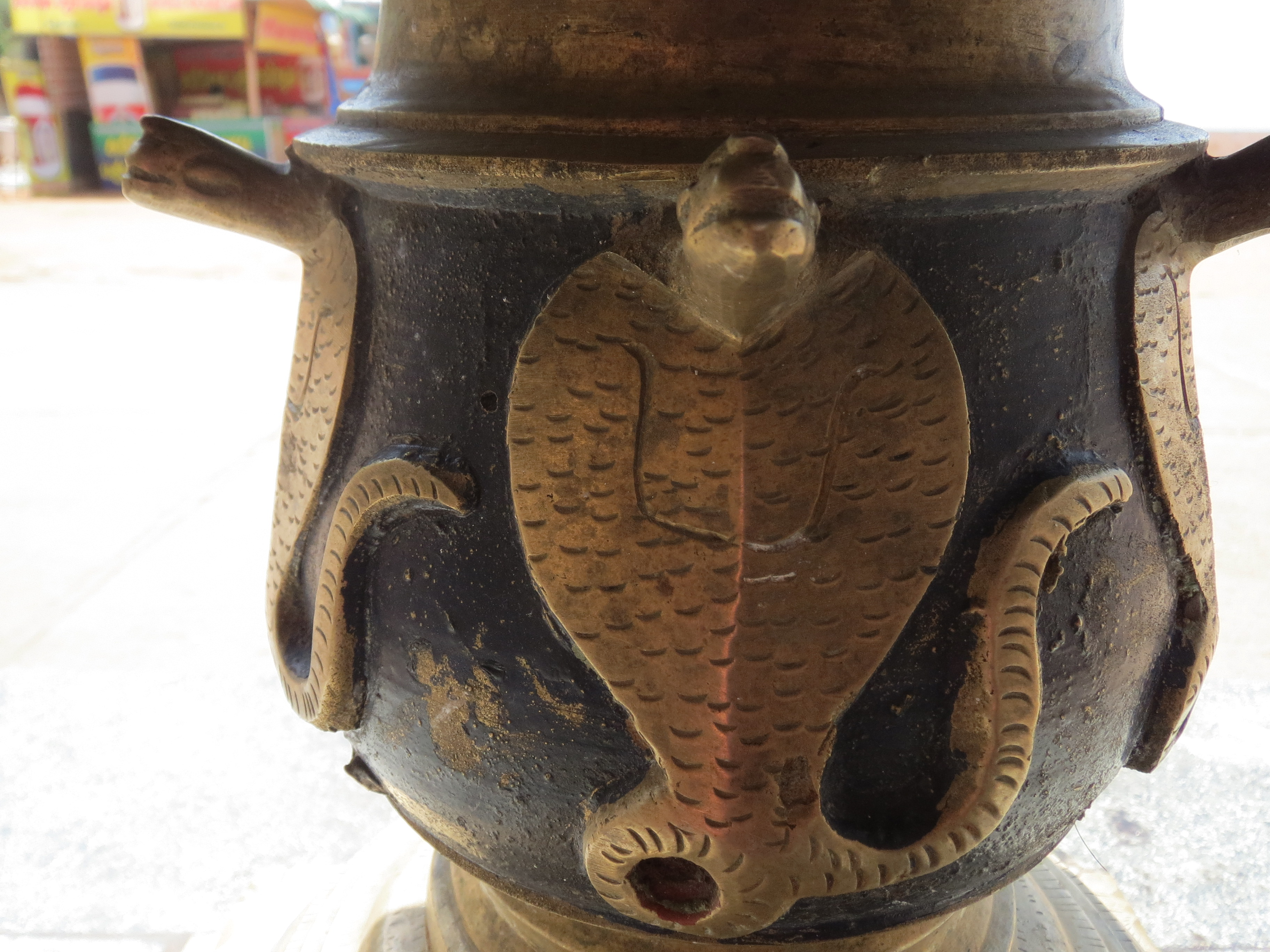
Serpant art on the peacock-faced lamp in front of the Valampuri Vinayakar

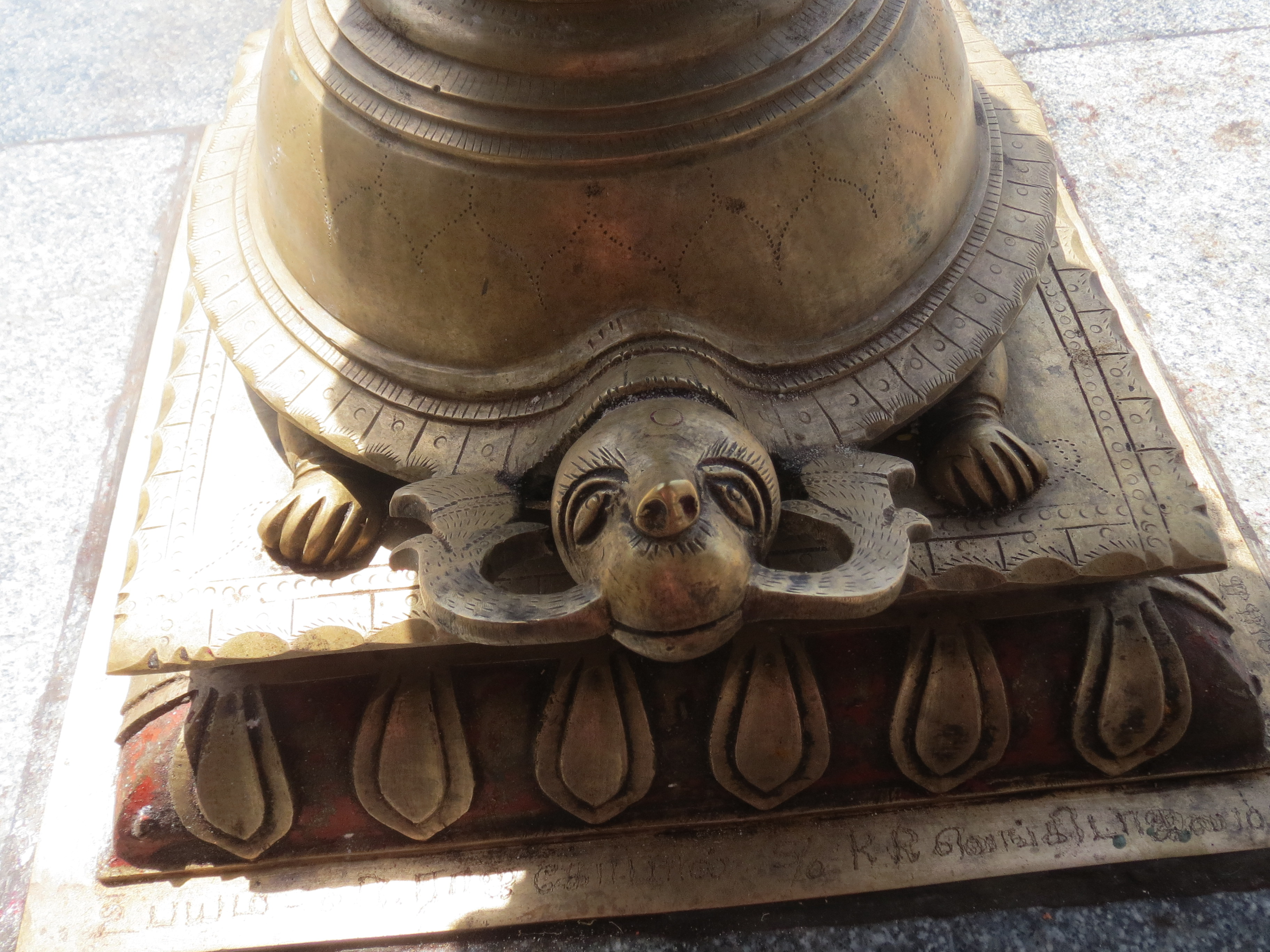
Tortoise-shaped base of the peacock-faced lamp in front of the Valampuri Vinayakar

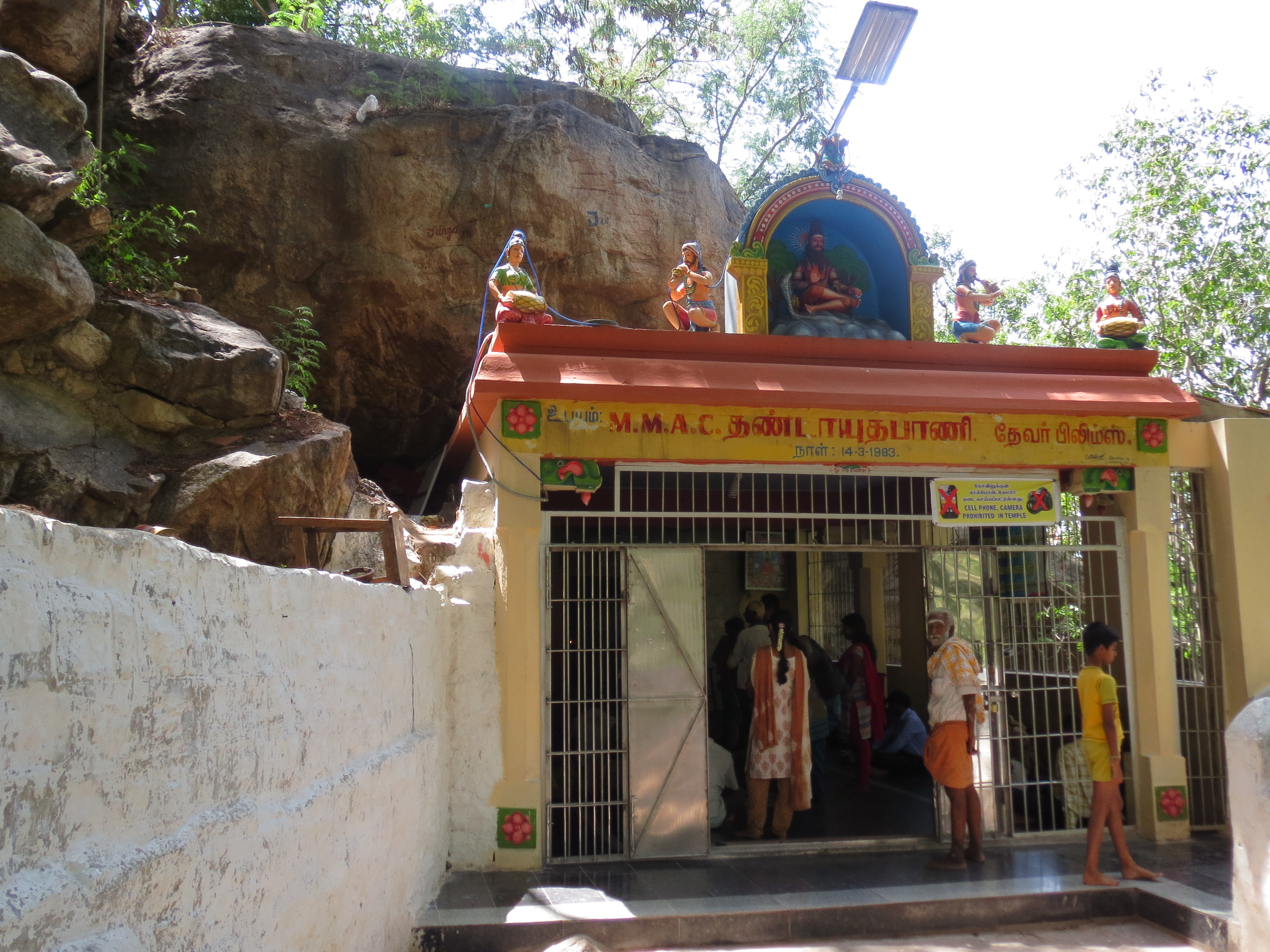
Pampatti Sitthar cave shrine
