= Kalangi Nathar =

Indian ascetic

Kalangi Nathar was an Indian ascetic who belonged to both the natha tradition of northern India and the siddha tradition of southern India. He was the guru of saint Bhogar and was born in Varanasi and belonged to the ancient tradition of nava (nine) nātha sadhus (holy ascetics), tracing their tradition to Shiva.

There are 18 Siddhars popularly known in Tamil literature. Kalangi Nathar is the one among the 18 Siddhars. Kalangi stayed in Sathuragiri Hills and in Pothigai hills and is believed to have controlled wild animals with mantras. Kalangi is known for his tall physique and was an expert in the art of breath control (vaasi yogam).

Kalangi nathar is a disiple of siddhar Thirumular and he is considered to be one of his seven pupils. He is associated with the Kanjamalai hill in southern India and is often referred to us "Kanjamalai Siddhar". (Note: The word "kanjam" stands for the following — gold, copper and iron and "malai" means hill. It is said that Parantaka Chola who built Sri Nataraja temple with the golden roof, took gold from this hill. The water falls seen on this hill are called "Ponni Nadhi".) He attained mukti on this hill, near Kanchipuram, where his samadhi, now known as the Sidhhar Kovil temple, is still located. The hill is found in Sivathapuram a small village, 12 km away from Salem, India, enroute to Elampillai. The temple is also associated with Kali and Murugan.

== Biography ==
Kalangi Nathar was born in Kashi (Benares). According to Bhogar's poems Kalangi was his father, which would mean that he was from the Porkollar (goldsmith) or the Vishwakarma caste. Boghar glorifies Kalangi in many of his verses. Kalangi and Bhogar were considered to possess an ideal master and student relationship. It is said that they had mutual spiritual progress. Kalangi especially took care of the spiritual advancement of his disciple Bhogar and was behind Bhogar's development and innovations.

He was the disciple of the great siddhar Tirumular. He is one among the seven disciples whom Tirumular bestowed his knowledge, the other six being Indran, Soman, Rudhran, Kanduru, Brahman, and Kanjamalaiyan.

== Legacy ==
Kalangi Nathar is considered an immortal Siddha and a world-renowned teacher of alchemy. He was well-versed in the ashtama siddhi (eight great siddhis), which include the ability to transfer one's soul into another body. He established and guided seven monasteries. He met many Siddhas. It is said that he possessed the power to fly like the wind. In China, Kalanginathar instructed Siddhar Bogar in all aspects of the Siddha sciences. These included the preparation and use of the kayakalpa herbal formulae to promote longevity. He was highly knowledgebale in the medicinal field and used herbs to cure his devotee's diseases. In Bhogar Jnana Sagarama (Bhogar’s Oceanic Life Story, consisting of 557 verses, verse number 2, lines number 3 and 4), Bogar states that the great Siddha Kalangi Nathar initiated him in Jnana Yoga (Kriya Dhyana yogam) - supreme self-knowledge. Bogar received initiation from the illustrious Natha Yogi, Kalangi. Contemplative insight allegedly guided Bogar to construct a primitive form of aircraft that he used in a journey to China.

== Works ==
Kalanginathar Vagara Thiraviyam

Kalanginathar Vaithiya Kaaviyam

Kalanginathar Gnanasaraamsam

Kalanginathar Gnana poojavithi

Kalanginathar Indirajaala Gnanam

Kalanginathar Gnana Soothiram

Kalanginathar Upadesa Gnanam

Kalanginathar Thandagam

== Last part of life ==
Kalangi nathar decided to enter into samadhi in seclusion for 3000 years. He summoned bhoganathar telepathically from Tamilnadu to China to take over his mission. Bhoganathar traveled by sea, following the trade route. After Kalagi Nathar entered into trance, Bhoganathar assumed his teaching mission to the chinese. Kalanginathar attained the immortal state at the ago of 315.

== Identification with other saints ==
=== Kamalamuni ===
Kalangi Nathar is often believed to be the same as the saint Kamalamuni. In the 63rd song of Kamalamuni Suthiram 76, a line states "Kamalamuni alias Kalangi".

The following information is available about Sri Kamalamuni in the book Bogar 7000 written by Bhogar.

- Song 5729: Kamalamuni was born in the Tamil month of Vaikasi (May — June), his birth star being the second part of Poosam.
- Song 5725: The siddhar named Kamalamuni belongs to Kuravar caste. He lived for six-eight generations.
- Song 5841: Kamalamuni is 4000 years and some 300 odd (days) old. He lived in China for a long time.

However, Karuvurar in his book Vadha Kaviyam (song 584) says that "Maamuni" belonged to the "Kannar" caste. He does not explicitly say "Kamalamuni", but only mentions the name of "Maamuni". It is not clearly known whether Karuvurar refers to Kamalamuni or not.

In Bhogar Janana Sasthra, it is mentioned that Kamalamuni attained samadhi at Madurai. It is believed that siddhar Kamalamuni attained samadhi at Thiruvarur.
