= Yama Dharmaraja Temple =

Hindu temple in Tamil Nadu, India

Coordinates: 10°21′41″N 79°12′02″E

Yama Dharmaraja Temple is a Hindu temple located at Thiruchitrambalam in the Thanjavur district of Tamil Nadu, India. The temple is one of the few temples dedicated to Yama, the god of death.

== Shrines ==
The presiding deity is Yama, the Hindu god of death. There are also shrines to Veeranar, Rakkachi, Muthumani, Karuppu Sami, Kombukkaran and Vaduvachi. There are also idols of Chitragupta, Pambatti Siddhar, Ayyanar and his consorts Poorna and Pushkalaa.

== Mythology ==
According to Hindu mythology, Kamadeva the Hindu god of love, provoked the ire of Shiva and was burnt to death. The Puradhana Vaneswarar Temple in neighboring Peravurani lies on the spot where the incident is said to have taken place. However, on Yama's request, Kamadeva was restored to life. The Yama Dharmaraja Temple is believed to have been built at the spot where he was restored to life.
