= Marudhamalai =

Suburb of Coimbatore in Tamil Nadu, India

- suburb
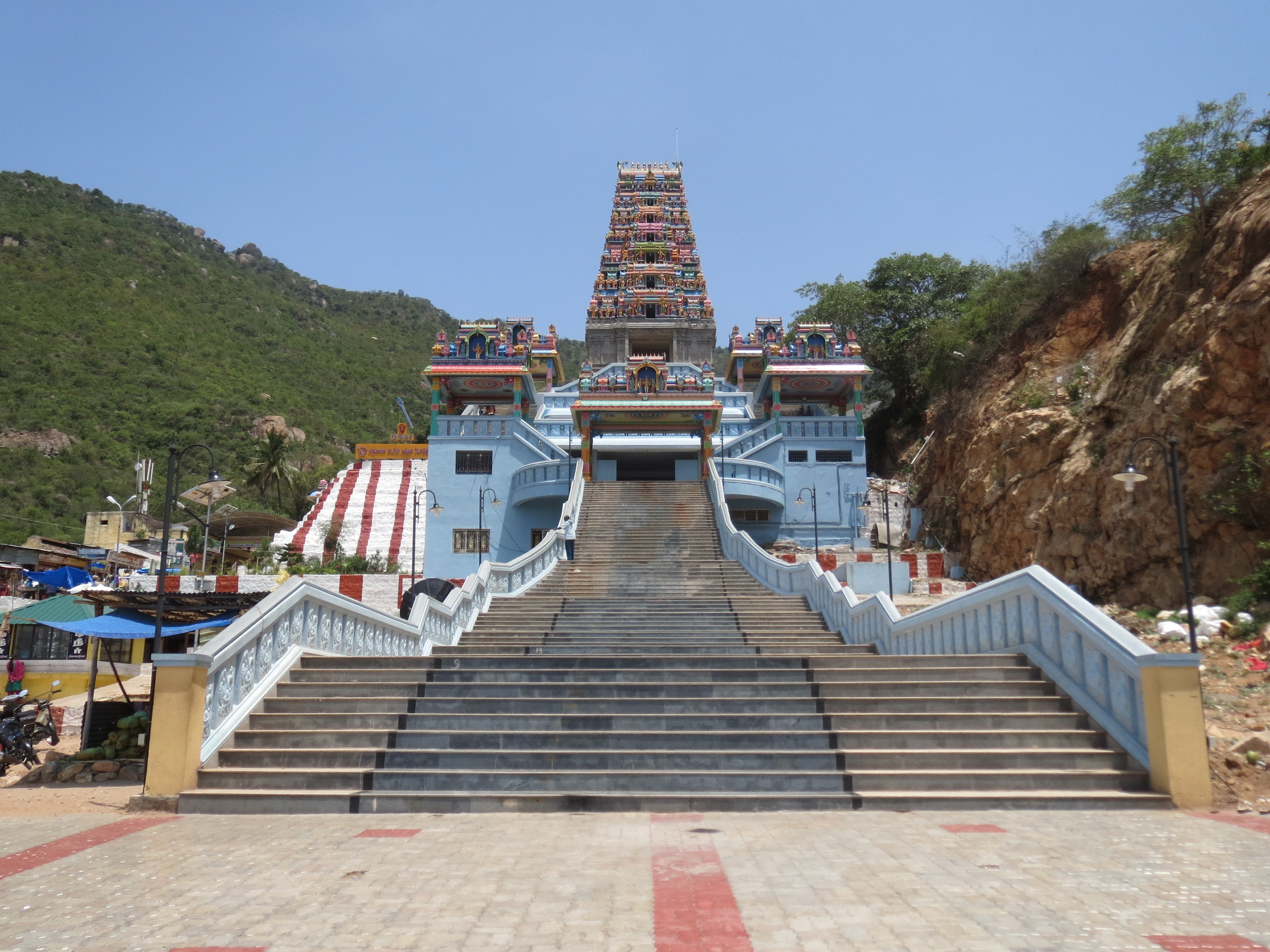

- Location within Tamil Nadu Location within Kerala Location within India
- Coordinates: 11.044°N 76.863°E
- Country: India
- State: Tamil Nadu
- Region: [[Tamil Nadu]]
- District: Coimbatore

Languages
  - Official: Tamil
- Time zone: UTC+5:30 (IST)
- PIN: 641046
- Telephone code: 91422

Marudhamalai is a suburb of Coimbatore in Tamil Nadu, India. Located along the Western Ghats, it is part of the Coimbatore Municipal Corporation. The area's economy relies largely on religious tourism, education, and hospitality. It houses the Maruthamalai Marudhachalamurthy Temple atop a hillock, which draws pilgrims and tourists. The campuses of Bharathiar University and the Government Law College are also situated in the region. It is well-connected via roads and public transport.

== Geography ==
Marudhamalai is situated along the Western Ghats, about 15 km (9.3 mi) northwest of central Coimbatore. The name derives from the combination of the Tamil words of Terminalia arjuna ("marudham") and "malai" meaning hill , referring to its wooded elevation of around 150–180 m (490–590 ft). It forms part of the Coimbatore Municipal Corporation.

== Temple ==
The suburb houses the Maruthamalai Marudhachalamurthy Temple atop a hillock, which draws pilgrims and tourists. The hill rises from plains with the summit, interspersed with herbs and medicinal plants. A 3 km (1.9 mi) ghat road ascends the hill, complemented by stepped footpaths (~837 steps) for pilgrims. The temple is considered to be the seventh abode of Murugan. The temple is about 1200 years old and featured in the Thiruppugal rendered by Arunagirinathar. Adjacent to the temple is a cave temple dedicated to Pambatti Siddhar. Major festivals include Thaipusam, Panguni Uthiram, Karthigai Deepam, Adi Peruku, Navarathri, and Tamil New Year, marked by rituals, processions, and cultural shows.

== Infrastructure ==
The temple acts as the core economic catalyst, financing itself via donations, parking, and transport fees. The Hindu Religious and Charitable Endowments Department manages the roads, entry systems, and operates bus shuttles, and elevators for accessibility. The ghat road was resurfaced in November 2023 and widened, with a new parking plaza at the foothills. The administration manages the temple access hours, and vehicle movement on festival days help regulate traffic flow. It is connected to Gandhipuram Town Bus stand and other parts of the city by public buses, and mini‑buses shuttle pilgrims between foothills and temple.

Local hospitality and retail services include food stalls, lodging, and herbal clinics. The suburb houses the campuses of Bharathiar University and the Government Law College, Coimbatore.
