= Pambatti Siddhar =

Hindu Tamil Shaivite monk

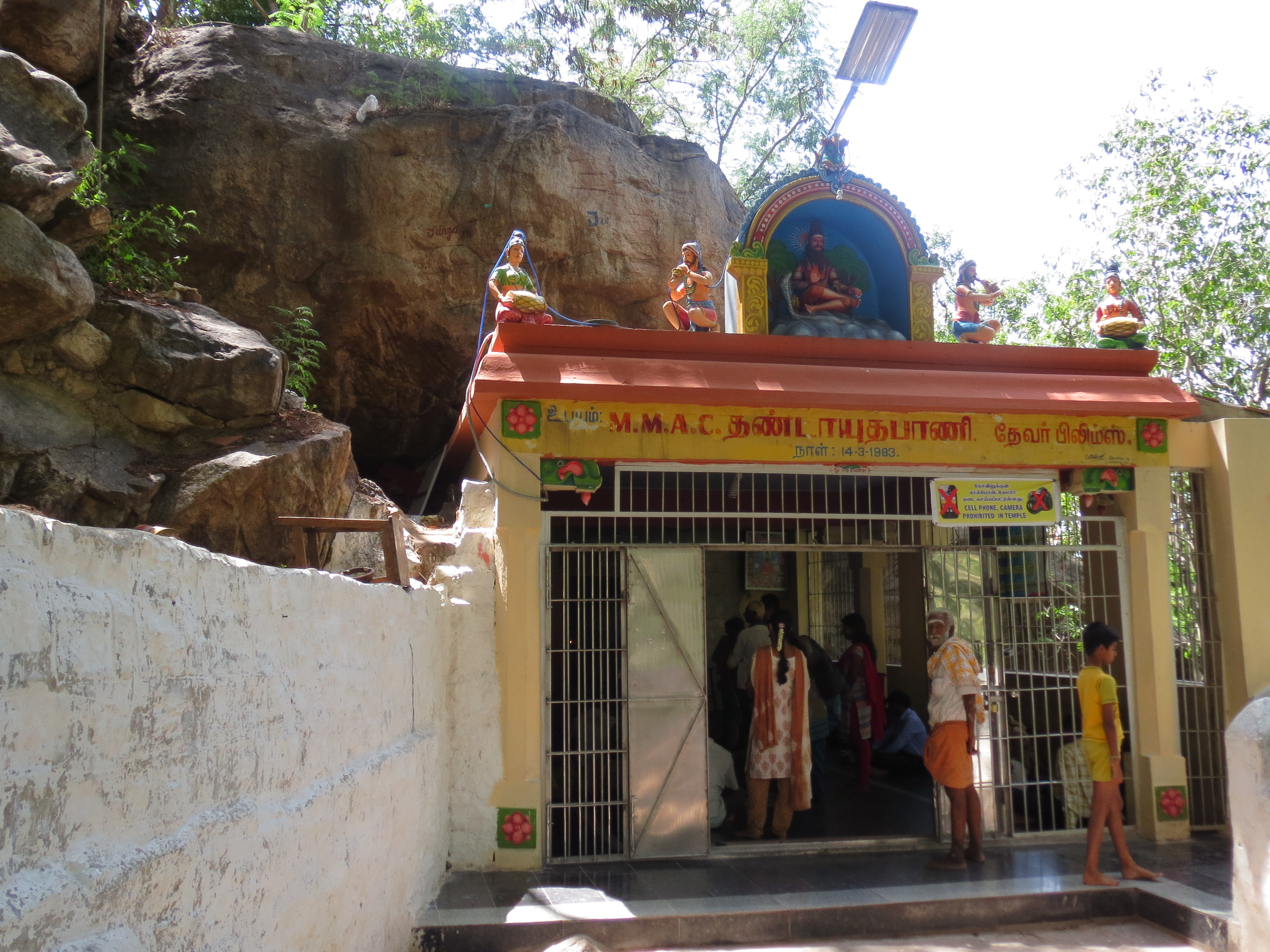
Pambatti Siddhar temple in Marudhamalai

Pambatti siddhar was one of the 18 siddhars, a lineage of monks or sages who lived at various time periods in India, mainly southern India. Some of his poems, roughly around 600 lines of text are available today. His poems are written in Tamil and he is famous for finishing his poems with the term 'Addu Pambe' which literally means 'dance, o snake'. Even his poems are addressed to snakes. Pambatti Siddhar sang of Shiva as the supreme power of the universe in his verses. Some of his poems also address his spiritual teacher or guru. Pambatti siddhar comes from the line of saints who are believed to have possessed siddhis or supernatural powers through rigorous meditation and other spiritual exercises. He is also believed to have caught snakes and sold them for living before he ventured into his spiritual quest.

Sri Pambatti siddhar had attained the eight supernatural powers called 'Ashtamasiddhi' after performing penance for a very long time in a cave on Marudamalai, near Coimbatore in Tamil Nadu. Also he lived in places like Mahalingamalai in Vathiraayiruppu, Kollimalai, and Bhavani. One notable aspect of his works are the usage of common slang language to explain complex spiritual experiences and siddhis. He has a flavour for imagination and often mentions that salvation is not possible without love in one's heart. He also performed pooja and meditated near Holy Marudha Tree (Terminalia arjuna) in Marudamalai by praying to Lord Murugan. He is believed to have attained Samadhi by practising his rigorous techniques in Sankarankoil. and Vaasi Techniques in Thirukadavur, Nagapattinam District. His duration of life is believed to be 123 Years. His guru was Sattaimuni.
