= Bogar =

Indian Tamil Siddhar

Bogar, Bhogar, or Boganathar was a Hindu Tamil Shaivite Siddhar. He was a disciple of the great siddhar Kalangi Nathar. Kalangi Nathar initiated him in Jnana yoga (supreme self-knowledge). There are 18 Siddhars popularly known in Tamil literature. He is the one among the 18 Siddhars. They are described as experts in Yoga, alchemy, literature, and philosophy, and as having the ability to move their souls to and from the bodies of others.

== Early life, family and his profession ==
He was born in Vaigavur near Palani Hills more than 5000 years ago. He received his education from his mother and his grand father described in several traditions and texts. Bogar himself describes his native roots in his book "Bogar 7000". Bogar went from Tamil Nadu to China and taught about enlightenment, this is also mentioned in his book Bogar 7000. The Tamraparniyan sea route was adopted by Bogar in his travels from South India to China via Sri Lanka (ancient Tamraparni).

According to one record of his long life, at a young age, Bogar became student of agastyar. He later left the country in order to travel to china and study under Kalanginathar, an immortal siddha and a well known teacher of alchemy. Bogar reputedly transmigrated his soul into the body of a dead chinese man and was henceforth known as Bo-Yang.

== Navapashanam Idol ==
Nava means "nine". Pashanam Means "Poisonous". Navapashanam is supposed to have cosmic energy to balance and harmonize all chakras in the body. One of the outstanding of all his works is sculpting the navapashana idol of Lord Murugan and having the wisdom and grace to choose Palanimala to host the idol. In India, Ayurveda and siddha medical science has been known for the use of "alchemical formulas". "Navapashanam" is one of the most acclaimed siddha elixirs known to man kind. Navapashanam is an amalgam of 9 poisonous herbs, and it's also the most closely guarded ancient secret formula given by the master siddha alchemist Bogar. The Statue of Murugan at the Palani temple is made of navapashanam. This magical elixir is believed to cure diseases.

Bhogar Siddhar was the one who created the famous navapashana idol of Lord Murugan at Palani. He created nine poisonous substances by blending over 4000 herbs. Then, he mixed the nine poisonous substances in a particular ratio to form a material that was more indestructible than the stronger iron.

There is an extant statue of lord Murugan in Navapashanam. The milk that was poured on this statue has been said to have mixed with some of the herbs thereby proving to be an effective cure for the diseases during the time

According to Siddhar medicine documents, Bogar was the discoverer of an elixir of immortality. The Pharmacognosy is the best known of his treatises. His other works are on yoga and archery, and a glossary of medicine.

== Legacy ==
A disciple of Agastya's teachings, Bogar himself taught meditation, alchemy, yantric designs and Kriya yoga at the Kataragama Murugan shrine, inscribing a yantric geometric design etched onto a metallic plate and installing it at the sanctum sanctorum of the Kataragama temple complex. Boganathar practiced Kundalini Yoga in four stages. The first three stages are described in a later chapter on "The Psychophysiology" of Kriya Kundalini Pranayama". Bhoganathar chose the Palani Malai (mountain) in what is now southwestern Tamil Nadu as the site for intensive yogic practice (tapas) for the final stage. Bogar is one of the earliest pilgrims to have traversed the Murugan Tiruppadai of Sri Lanka. He also established the temple for Murugan in Poombarai Kuzhanthai Velappar temple Kodaikanal Tamil Nadu, India.

It is said as per the last wishes of his guru Kalangi Nathar, Bhogar proceeds to china to spread the knowledge of Siddha sciences and his journey is said to have been made with the aid of an aircraft. He demonstrated to the chinese the details of the construction of the aircraft and later built for them a sea-going craft using steam engine.

== Notable works ==
- Bogar Saptha Kaandam 7000
- Bogar Jananasaagaram 550
- Bogar Nigandu 1200
- Bogar Nigandu karukidai
- Bogar Nigandu kaiyedu
- Bogar Vaithiya kaaviyam 1000
- Bogar 700
- Bogar Panchapatchi Sathiram
- Bogar Karpam 300
- Bogar Varma Soothiram 100
- Bogar Malai Vaagadam
- Bogar 12000
- Bogar Nigandu 1700
- Bogar Vaithiyam 1000
- Bogar Sarakku Vaippu 800
- Bogar Updesam 150
- Bogar Rana Vaagadam 100
- Bogar Gnanasaaraamsam 100
- Bogar Karppa Soothiram 54
- Bogar Vaithiya Soothiram 77
- Bogar Muppu Soothiram 51
- Bogar Gnana Soothiram 37
- Bogar Attanga Yogam 24
- Bogar Poojavithi 20
- Tao Te Ching (the saint is often identified with Laozi in India)

== Last part of life ==
Bogar went to Palani where he attained swarūpa samādhi. He retired to Katirkāmam, where Babaji Nagaraj met him around 211 AD.

== Notable disciples ==
- His first disciple is Shri Pulippani Siddhar (Pulikaisar), who’s also one among the 18 siddhars
- Mahavatar Babaji
- Karuvurar

== See also ==
- Arulmigu Dhandayuthapani Swamy Temple, Palani
- Agastya
- Tirumular
- Kalanginathar
