= Poombarai =

- Village
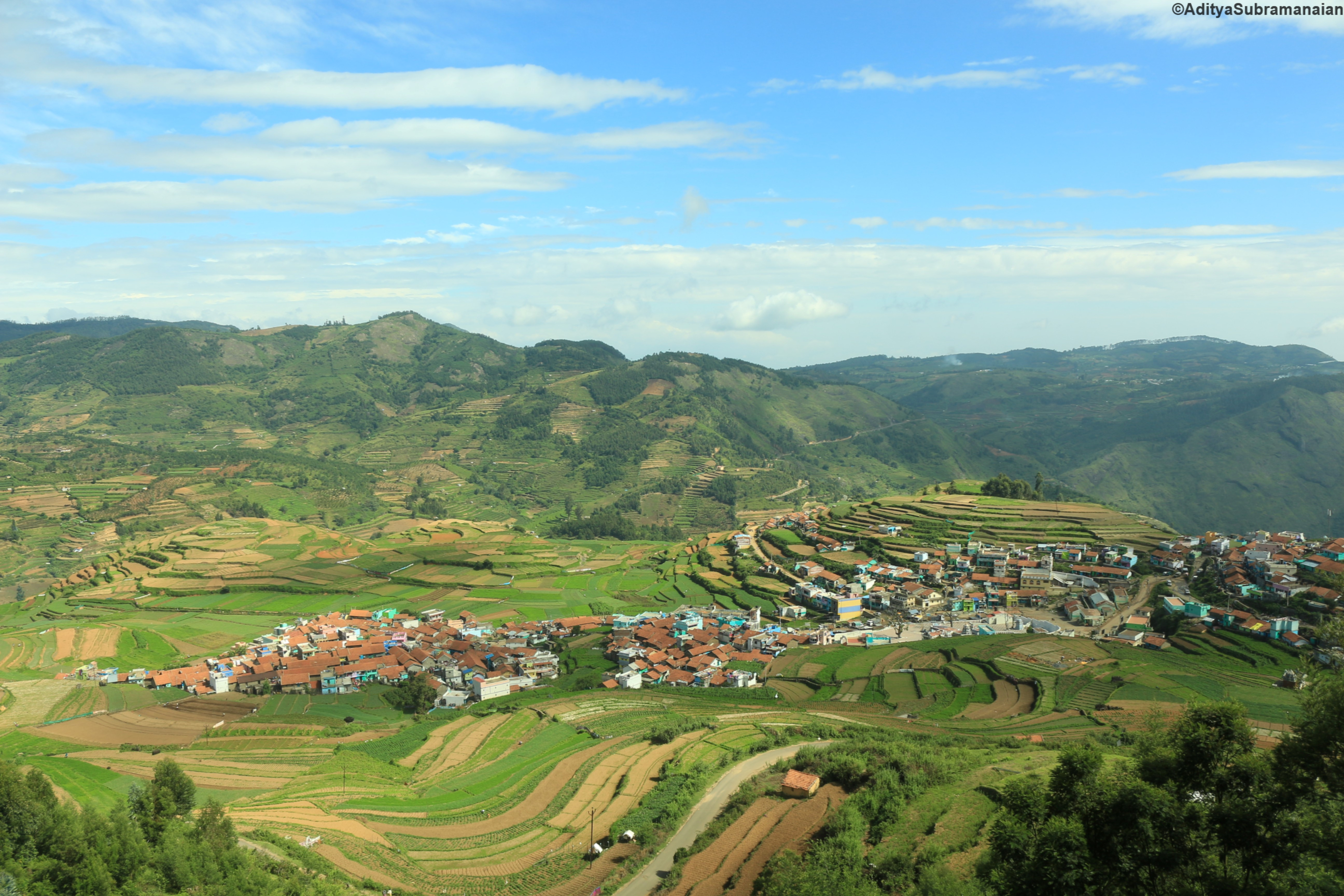
- Poombari village seen from the southeast

- Location in Tamil Nadu, India Poombarai (India)
- Coordinates: 10°15′23″N 77°24′26″E
- Country: India
- State: Tamil Nadu
- District: Dindigul
- Talukas: Kodaikanal
- Elevation: 1,920 m (6,300 ft)

Population (2001)
  - Total: 4,456

Languages
  - Official: Tamil
- Time zone: UTC+5:30 (IST)

Poombarai is a hill station and village in Kodaikanal taluk, Dindigul district, in the Indian state of Tamil Nadu.

== Geography ==
Poombarai is located at the heart of the Palani hills, 18 kilometers (11 mi) from Kodaikanal. Points of interest include terraced farming that gives the village an aesthetic landscape.

== Demographics ==
Poombarai has a population of 3258 as of 2008, of whom 2,251 are male and 2,205 are female. The 1533 workers include 554 casual labourers, 145 subsistence cultivators, 114 artisans, 10 salarymen and 5 others.

Of the 1531 children aged 5 to 14 years old, 891 are in work and not school, 136 are in both school and work, and 504 are in school and not work.

== Economics ==
The village hosts a Canara Bank Branch and an Indian Digital Studio.

== Education ==
Poombarai has a Panchayat Union high school, a Government higher secondary School and a Nursery and Primary School.

== Kuzhanthai Velapar Temple ==
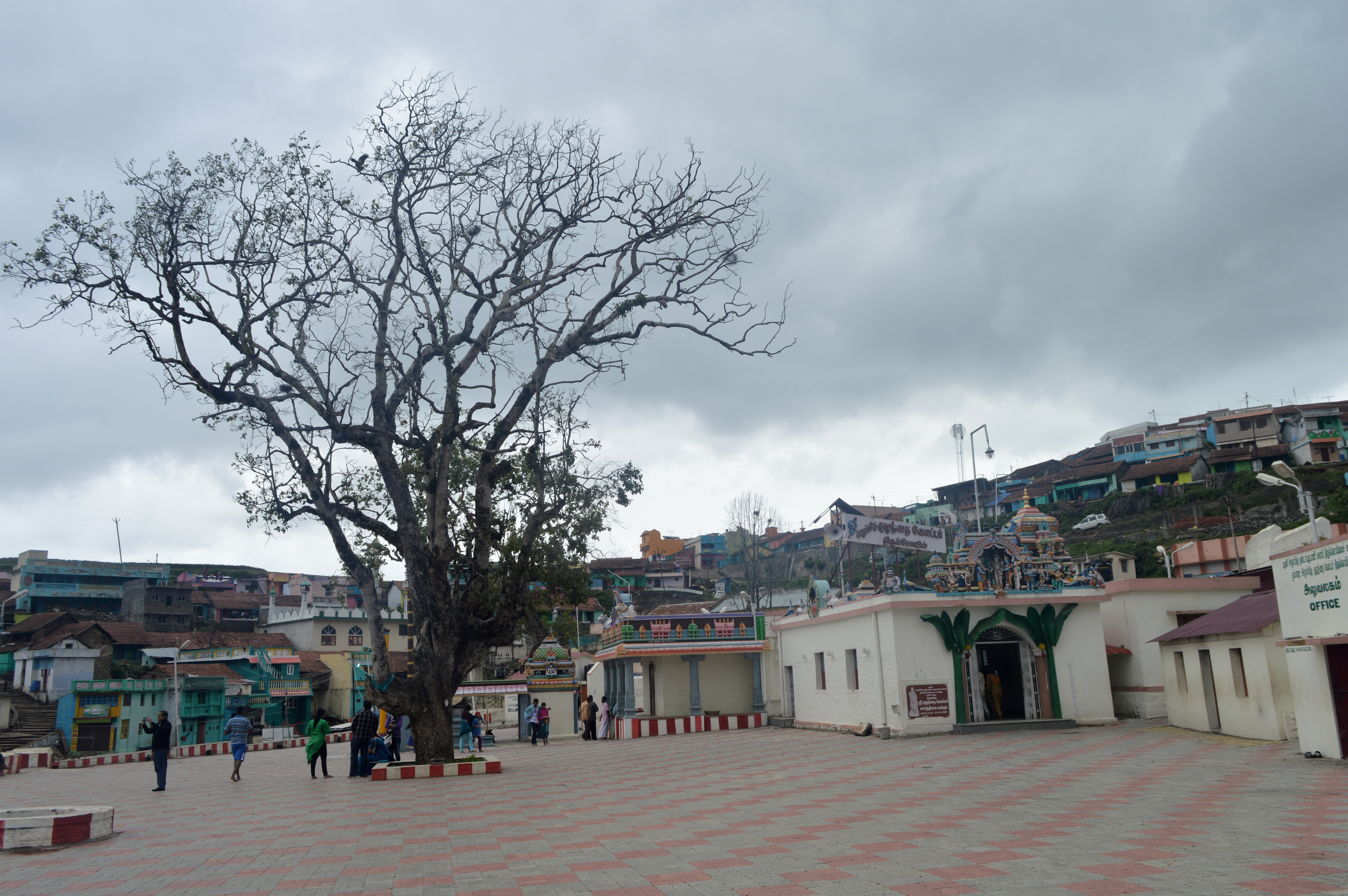
Kulandai Velayudha Swami Tirukkovil

The Kuzhanthai Velappar Temple (Kulandai Velayudha Swami Tirukkovil) was consecrated in the 5th century BC by Bhogar, a Tamil siddhar. The temple comes under Pazhani Devasthanam. Every year Poombarai celebrates the Ther Thiruvizha procession for Lord Muruga, The Hindu Tamil god, which falls on Kettai nakshatra, normally in Thai or Maasi month of the Tamil calendar.

A temple of Lord Muruga in Poombarai village, was constructed in the 10th and 12 centuries. When Bogar returned from China after completing the Palani Andavar statue, he built one more Navabashanam idol at middle of Palani and Poombari Western gates. Nowadays, the place is called Yanai Gejam.

== Infrastructure ==
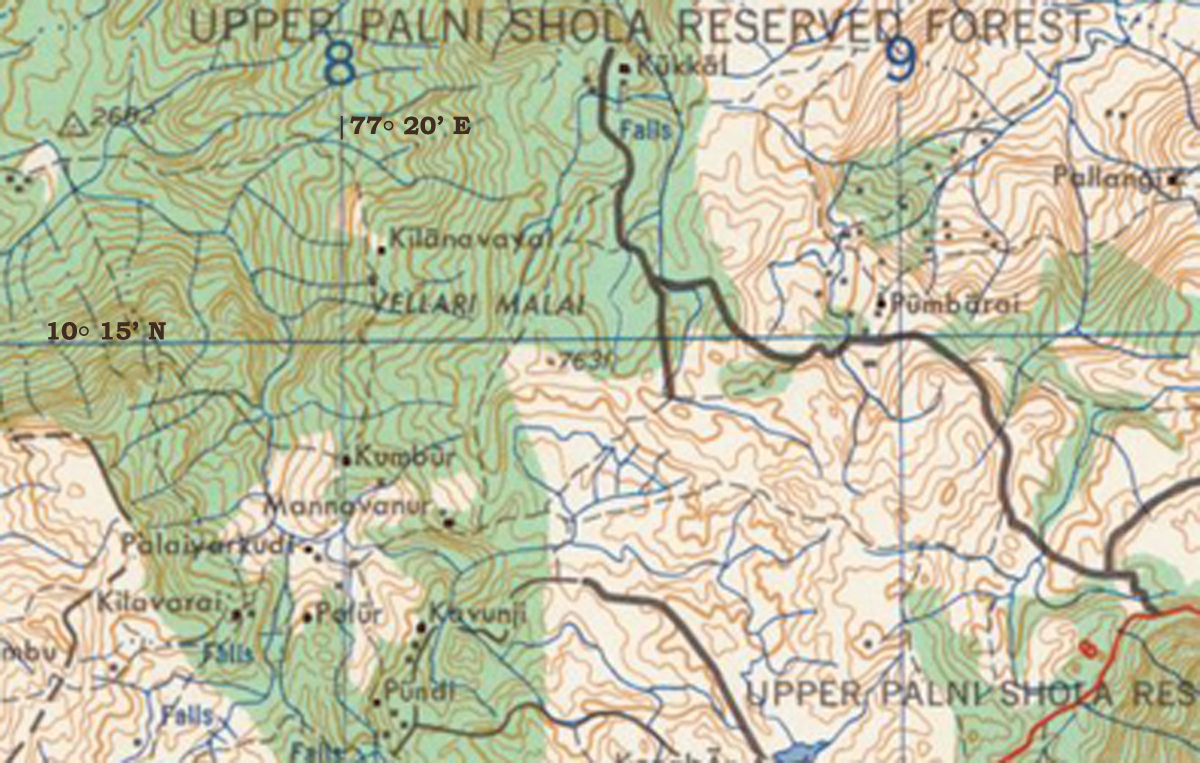
Upper Palani Reserve Forest showing Poombarail

Poombarai has a forest department rest house, and a Government Primary Health Centre located adjacent to Temple running since 5 August 2016.
