= Puradhanavaneswarar Temple, Thiruchitrambalam =

Hindu temple in Tamil Nadu

Puradhana Vaneswarar Temple is a Hindu temple located at Thiruchitrambalam near Pattukkottai in the Thanjavur district of Tamil Nadu, India.

== Vaippu Sthalam ==
It is one of the shrines of the Vaippu Sthalams sung by Tamil Saivite Nayanar Sundarar. The temple is located in Pattukkottai-Arantangi road, at a distance of 15 k.m. from Pattukkottai and, at a distance of 34 k.m. from Arantangi. Vinayaka of this temple is known as Poovilungi Vinayaka, the Vinayaka who would swallow the flowers.

== Presiding deity ==
The presiding deity in the garbhagriha, represented by the lingam, is known as Puradhanavaneswarar. The Goddess, the consort, is known as Periyanayaki. An idol of Ganesha is present in the shrine of Periyanayaki Ambal.

== Architecture ==
Two ponds are found near the temple. Inscriptions of Chola, Pandya and Vijayanagara are found in this temple. The main gopura is facing big pond called 'kaasaan kulam'. According to popular legend, the spot was chosen by Shiva for meditation. Manmatha, the Hindu Cupid, tried to interrupt his meditation and was burnt to ashes. Manmatha was later revived at Thiruchittrambalam. The place is commemorated with the Yama Dharmaraja Temple.

== Festival ==
Mahasivaratri festival is held in this temple. In ancient time every year float festival was held in this temple. At that time, the main deity Puradhanavaneswarar would be kept on the float.
