= Karuvurar =

- Siddhar
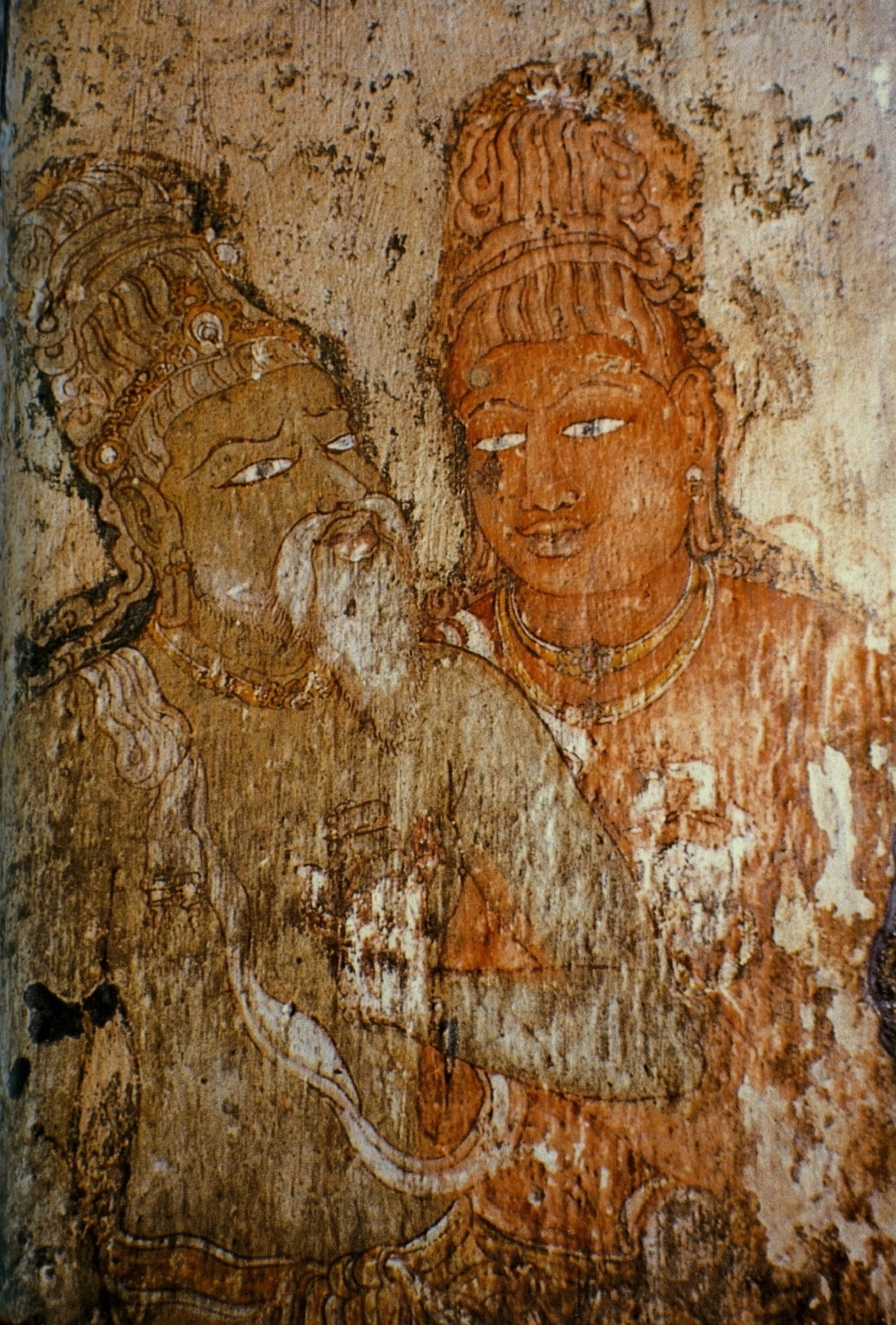
- Karuvurar (left) with Rajaraja I (right)
- Born: Karuvoor, Chola Empire (modern day Karur, Tamil Nadu, India)
- Died: Karuvoor, Chola Empire (modern day Karur, Tamil Nadu, India)
- Religion: Hinduism

Karuvurar was a sage or Siddhar from Karuvur (modern Karur) in Tamil Nadu, India. There are 18 Siddhars popularly known in Tamil literature. He is the one among the 18 Siddhars. Believers describe Siddhars as having the "ability to perceive the higher cosmic movements in universe." They are described as experts in Yoga, alchemy, literature, and philosophy, and as having the ability to move their souls to and from the bodies of others.

== Early life, family and his profession ==
Karuvurar Siddhar lived in Karuvoor in Tamil Nadu now it is called as Karur. He lived during the reign of the Emperor Rajaraja I. According to the evidence from the Saint Agathiyar’s work "Agathiyar-12000" and the Saint Bogar's work "Bogar - 7000", Karuvurar was descended from a Tamil Sculptor family. His parents were in the hereditary business of forging idols out of metals and alloys. The parents of Karuvoorar Siddhar were dedicated to creating temple idols, by visiting various places of purity and divine significance, while architecting idols by forging the nine metals, and they honed these skills to make a livelihood. So naturally Karuvurar Siddhar excelled as an alchemist. For some time, he also engaged in the business of doing sculpture work, and developed various god’s idol through his expert knowledge in the art of sculpting the divine idols as per the evidence from Agathiyar's work "Agathiyar-12000" verse 466.

== Disciple of Saint Bogar ==
Karuvurar learnt the subjects from various famous gurus, and got great knowledge. He learnt the concepts of siddha from the Saint Bogar or Bhogar. When Siddhar Bogar visited Thiruvaduthurai, Karuvurar met with Siddhar and requested Bogar to accept him as his disciple. Bogar accepted Karuvurar and initiated him into the worship his family deity “Ambal”. Karuvoorar attainted Kundalini shakthi in a short period of time. He learnt Siddha Science, Siddha Yoga and Gnana Yoga from Siddhar Bogar. Apart from his knowledge in other divine subjects, he also had an interest in doing Yoga and Meditation. Siddhar Karuvurar performed many miracles and safeguarded people from various ailments. He was a great siddha with good knowledge in various fields. During his period, he also performed many wonders in the life of the people, and directed them to lead a sin free life. He took care of his devotees in a proper manner, and taught the divine knowledge to them. He helped them to attain spiritual energy through meditation and prayers.

== Arrest ==
According to one story the King Hiranya Varman arrested Karuvurar for some reasons as he didn’t know that Karuvurar was a saint. The saint Bogar came and instructed the king to release his disciple Karuvurar and he was ready to give the gold for compensation. The king and the saint Bogar went to the prison to release Karuvurar. He was nowhere in the cell. Everyone was shocked and the king shivered with fear, but saint Bogar knew that Karuvurar was in an invisible state so he asked him to appear and suddenly Karuvurar appeared in front of all.

== Contributions to Thanjavur Peru Udaiyar Temple ==
The Big Temple, also known as Thanjai Peruvudaiyar Brihadishvara Temple, is a protected monument and a part of the UNESCO World Heritage Site. Brihadishvara Temple was constructed in the 11th century by the Chola King Raja Raja Chola I (985 AD–1014 AD). The temple is built using granite, displaying the engineering and architectural knowledge of that time. The Big Temple has been designed using traditional knowledge, which is held as family secret and passed down from father to son. It was completed by the engineers named Kunjara Mallan Raja Raja Perunthachan (Chief Architect & Sculptor), and the Second level architects are Nithavinotha Perunthachan, Sadayan Kandaraditha Perunthachan.

Karuvurar had a significant contribution to the completion of the Brihadishvara Temple. He was the Guru for the King Rajaraja I. While building this temple, he faced many big challenges. The priests found it impossible to affix the huge Shiva Linga on the base for the Sanctum - Sanctorum of the temple. The last but not the least was Karuvurar, who is said to have helped the installation of the great Siva Lingam in the Big temple at Thanjavur and performed miracles before he left his mortal coil at karur of Tiruchirapalli District.

== Works ==
- Karuvoorar Vaatha Kaaviyam 700
- Karuvoorar Vaithiyam 500
- Karuvoorar Yoga Gnanam 500
- Karuvoorar Pala Thirattu 300
- Karuvoorar Gurunool Soothira 105
- Karuvoorar Poorana Gnanam 100
- Karuvoorar Meisurukkam 52
- Karuvoorar Sivagnana Petham 42
- Karuvoorar Karppa Vithi 39
- Karuvoorar Muppu Soothiram 30
- Karuvoorar Attamaasiththu

== Last part of life ==
He attained Samadhi in Sri Pasupatheeswarar temple in Karur.
