= Siddhar =

Tamil wonder-workers and sages

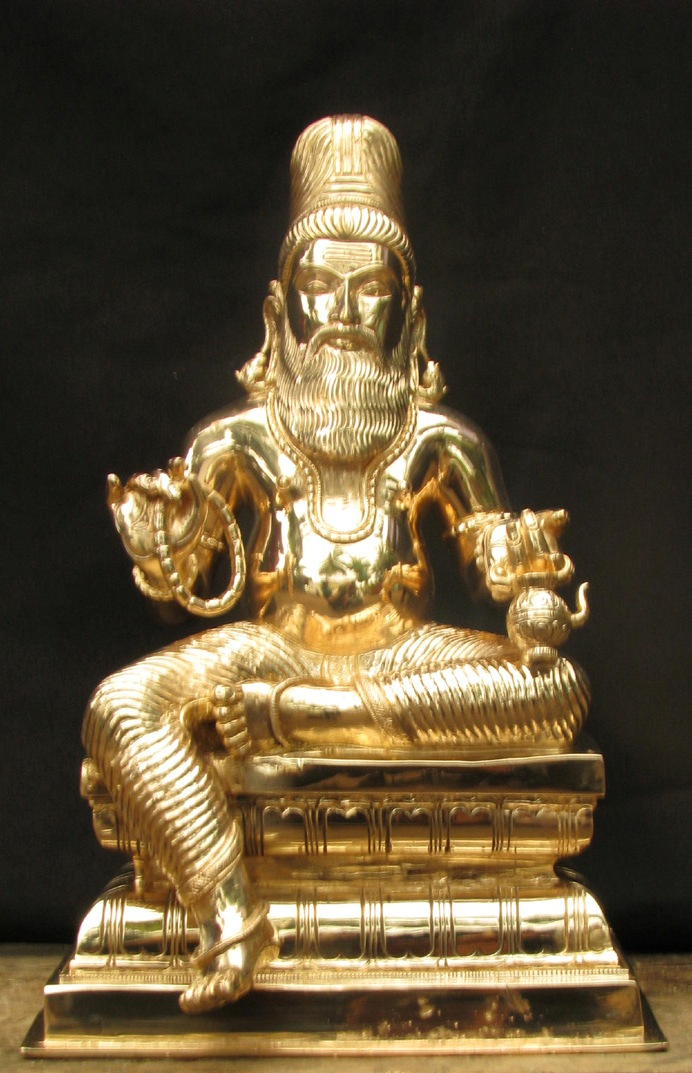
Agastya, the first Siddhar

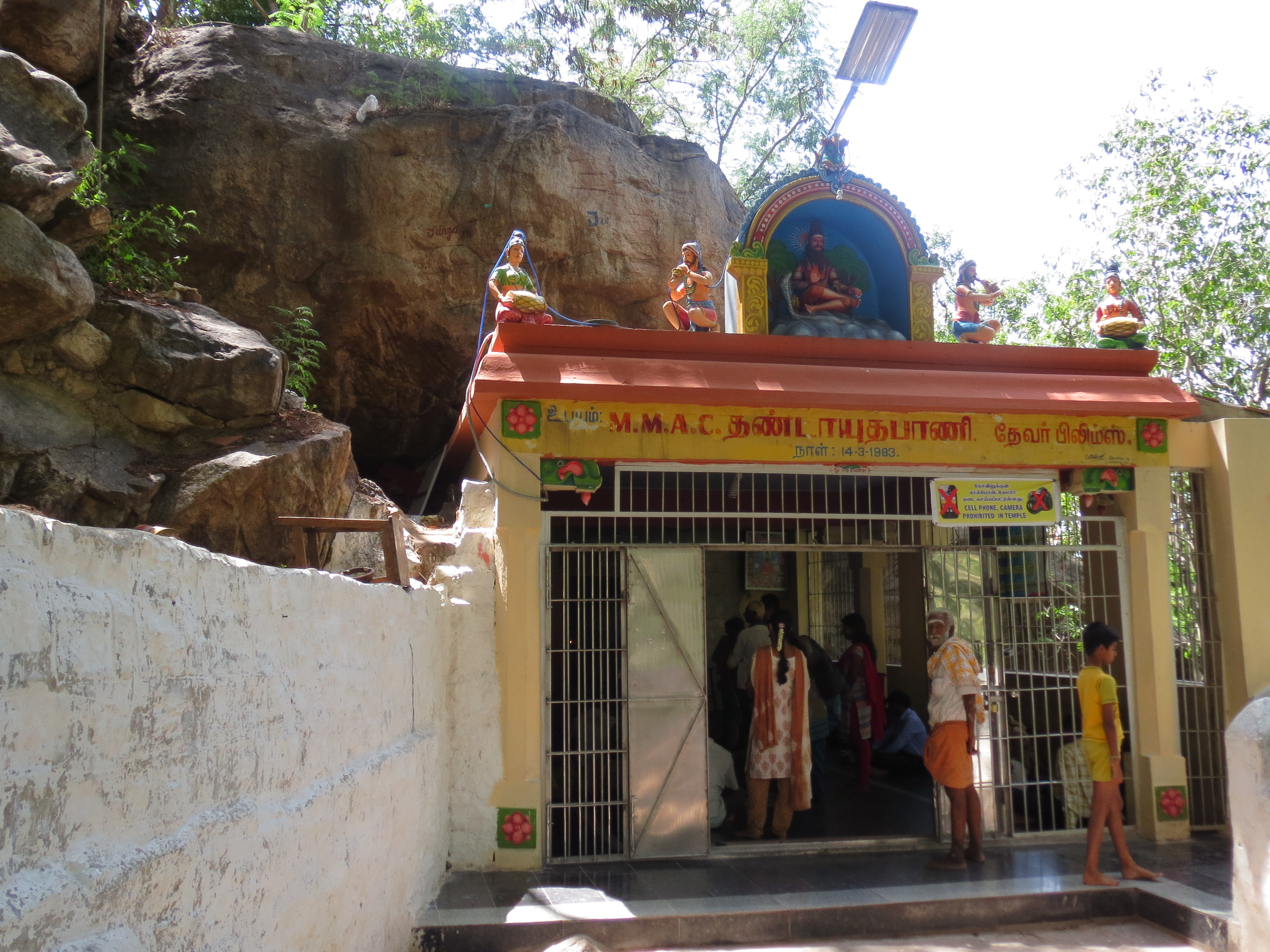
Pambatti Siddhar Sannidhi at Marudamalai Temple

The Siddhar (Tamil (romanized) cittar; from Sanskrit siddha) in Tamil tradition is a perfected individual who has attained spiritual powers called siddhi.

Historically, Siddhar also refers to the people who were early-age wandering adepts that dominated ancient Tamil teaching and philosophy. They were knowledgeable in science, technology, astronomy, literature, fine arts, music, drama, and dance and provided solutions to common people's illnesses and advice for their future. Some of their ideologies are considered to have originated during the First Sangam period.

== Practice ==
Siddhars were typically scientists, saints, doctors, alchemists, and mystics all in one. They wrote their findings in the form of Tamil poems on palm leaf manuscripts. They typically believe in one god, but there are some Siddhars who believe in polytheism. These are still owned by some families in Tamil Nadu and handed down through the generations, as well as being kept in universities in India, Germany, Great Britain, and the United States.

In this way, Siddhars developed the native Siddha medicine system. A rustic form of healing that is similar to Siddha medicine has since been practiced by experienced elders in the villages of Tamil Nadu. This is referred to as pātti vaittiyam (grandmother's medicine), nāttu maruntu (folk medicine), and mūlikai maruttuvam (herbal medicine).

Siddhars are also believed to be the founders of varma kalai - a martial art for self-defense and medical treatment at the same time with the application of pressure points.

Tamil Siddhars were the first to develop pulse-reading (naadi paarththal in Tamil) to identify the origin of diseases.

According to regional belief, the Siddhars are said to have resided for many ages upon a mountain called Sathuragiri, near the Thanipparai village in Tamil Nadu.

== Siddhars ==
The Abithana Chintamani encyclopedia states that the Siddhars are of the 18 persons listed below, but Agastya states that there are many who precede and follow these.

=== The 18 Siddhars ===
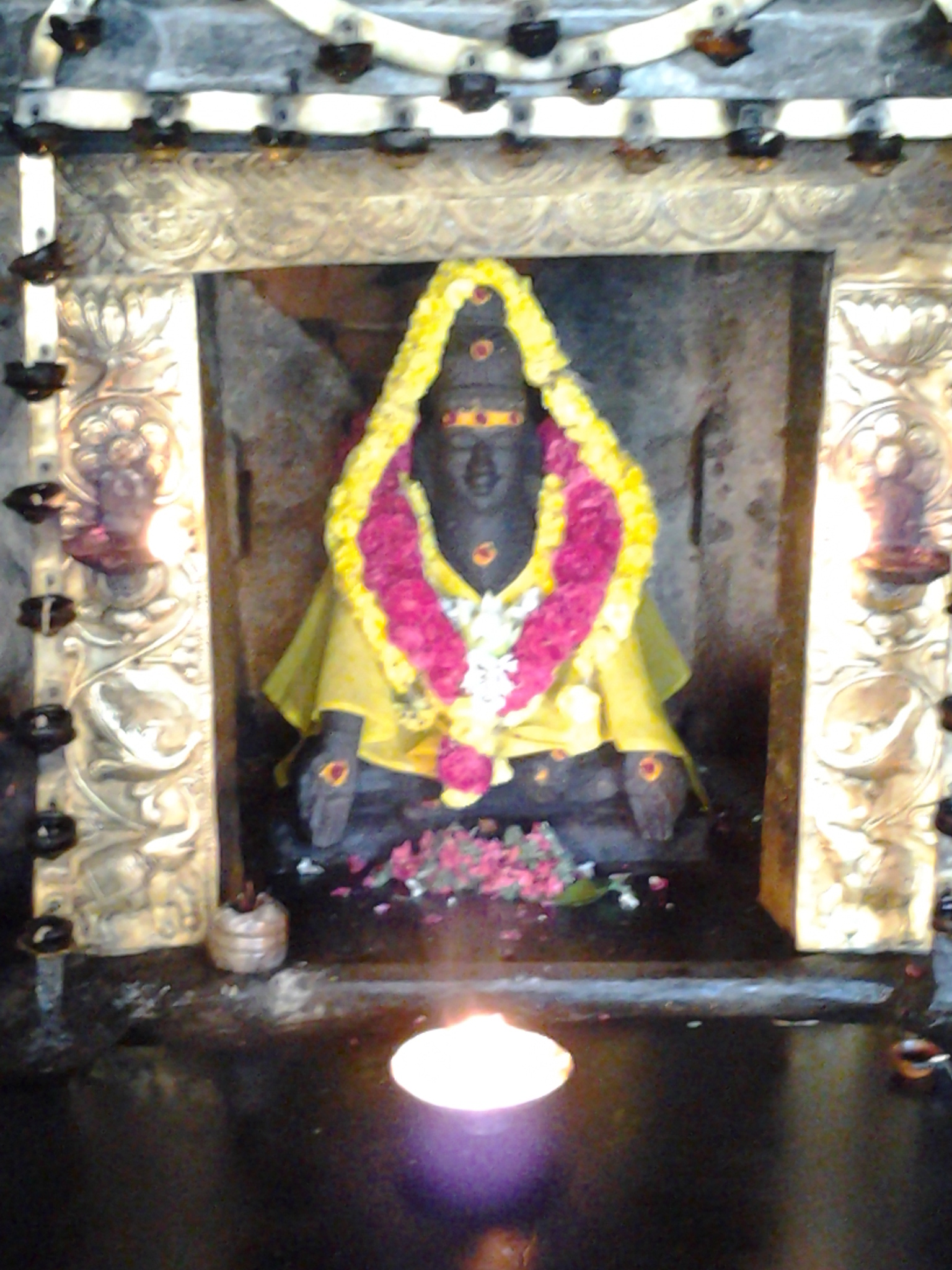
Murti of Karuvurar

There are 18 Siddhars in the Tamil Siddha tradition:

1. Nandi
2. Tirumular
3. Agastya
4. Kalangi Nathar (identified with Kamalamuni and/or Confucius)
5. Patanjali
6. Korakkar (identified with Gorakhnath)
7. Sundaranandar
8. Konganar
9. Sattaimuni
10. Vanmikar (Valmiki)
11. Ramadevar
12. Dhanvantari
13. Idaikaadar
14. Machamuni (identified with Matsyendranatha)
15. Karuvurar
16. Bogar (identified with Laozi)
17. Pambatti
18. Kuthambai

Apart from the 18 Siddhars listed above, there is another list of 18 Siddhars who represent the 9 Navagrahas (with two Siddhars representing each Navagraha). All navagraha doshas and pariharams are performed to the Siddhars as Siddhar Velvi (Siddhar havan). The details of the 18 Siddhars who represent the 9 Navagrahas are as follows:

1. Sivavakkiyar - Moon
2. Kambili - Moon
3. Bhogar - Mars
4. Kagabhujanga - Jupiter
5. Sri Pullipani Siddhar - Mars
6. Sattaimuni - Kethu
7. Sri Agapai Siddhar - Jupiter
8. Alugani - Rahu
9. Kudambai - Kethu
10. Vallalar - Mercury
11. Edaikaddar - Mercury
12. Pattinathar - Sun
13. Kaduvelli - Sun
14. Kanjamalai - Venus
15. Sennimalai - Venus
16. Kapilar - Saturn
17. Karuvurar - Saturn
18. Pampatti - Rahu

== Eight Perfections ==
Siddhars are believed to have had both major and minor powers that are described in detail in various yogic and religious texts.

- Aṇimā: the ability to reduce one's body to the size of an atom.
- Mahimā: the ability to expand one's body to an infinitely large size.
- Laghimā: the ability to become weightless or lighter than air.
- Garimā: the ability to become heavy or dense.
- Prāpti: the ability to realize whatever one desires.
- Prākāmya: the ability to access any place in the world.
- Īśiṭva: the ability to control all material elements or natural forces.
- Vaśiṭva: the ability to force influence upon anyone.

These eight are the Great Siddhis (Ashtama siddhis), or Great Perfections.

== See also ==
- Abithana Chintamani
- Avvaiyar (Sangam poet)
- Ayyavazhi mythology
- Bogar
- Mahasiddha
- Maruttuvar community
- Nayanars
- Siddha
- Tirumantiram
