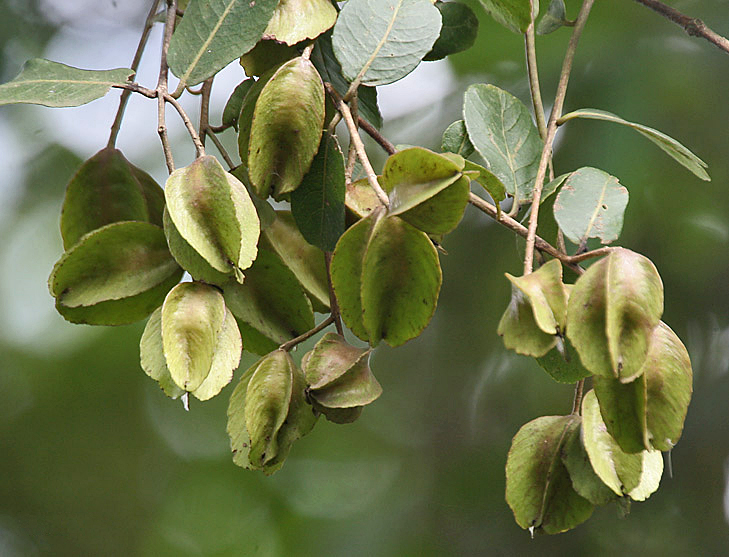
- Arjuna fruit
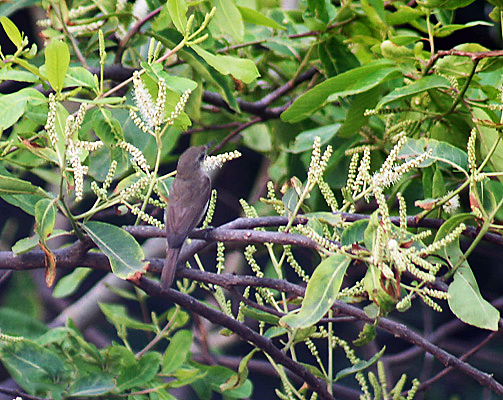
- Arjuna flowers with a Sykes's warbler

Scientific classification
- Kingdom: Plantae
- Clade: Tracheophytes
- Clade: Angiosperms
- Clade: Eudicots
- Clade: Rosids
- Order: Myrtales
- Family: Combretaceae
- Genus: Terminalia
- Species: T. arjuna

Binomial name
- Terminalia arjuna (Roxb.) Wight & Arn.

= Terminalia arjuna =

Species of tree

Terminalia arjuna is a tree of the genus Terminalia. It is commonly known as arjuna or arjun tree in English. It is used as a traditional medicinal plant.

== Description ==
T. arjuna grows to about 20–25 metres tall; usually has a buttressed trunk, and forms a wide canopy at the crown, from which branches drop downwards. It has oblong, conical leaves which are green on the top and brown below; smooth, grey bark; it has pale yellow flowers which appear between March and June; its glabrous, 2.5 to 5 cm fibrous woody fruit, divided into five wings, appears between September and November.

The tree does not suffer from any major diseases or any deadly pest infestation, but it is susceptible to Phyllactinia terminale and rot due to polystictus affinis.

== Distribution and habitat ==
The arjuna is seen across the Indian subcontinent, and usually found growing on river banks or near dry river beds in Uttar Pradesh, Bihar, Maharashtra, Madhya Pradesh, West Bengal, Odisha and south and central India, Karachi Pakistan along with Sri Lanka and Bangladesh. It has also been planted in Malaysia, Indonesia and Kenya.

== Importance ==
=== Silk production ===
The arjuna is one of the species whose leaves are fed on by the Antheraea paphia moth which produces the tassar silk, a wild silk of commercial importance.

=== Ecology ===
The arjuna is considered a keystone species in riparian forests of southern India, providing nesting habitat for species including Malabar giant squirrels and critically endangered white-rumped vultures. Dead trunks host termites, which in turn feed sloth bears.

== Gallery ==
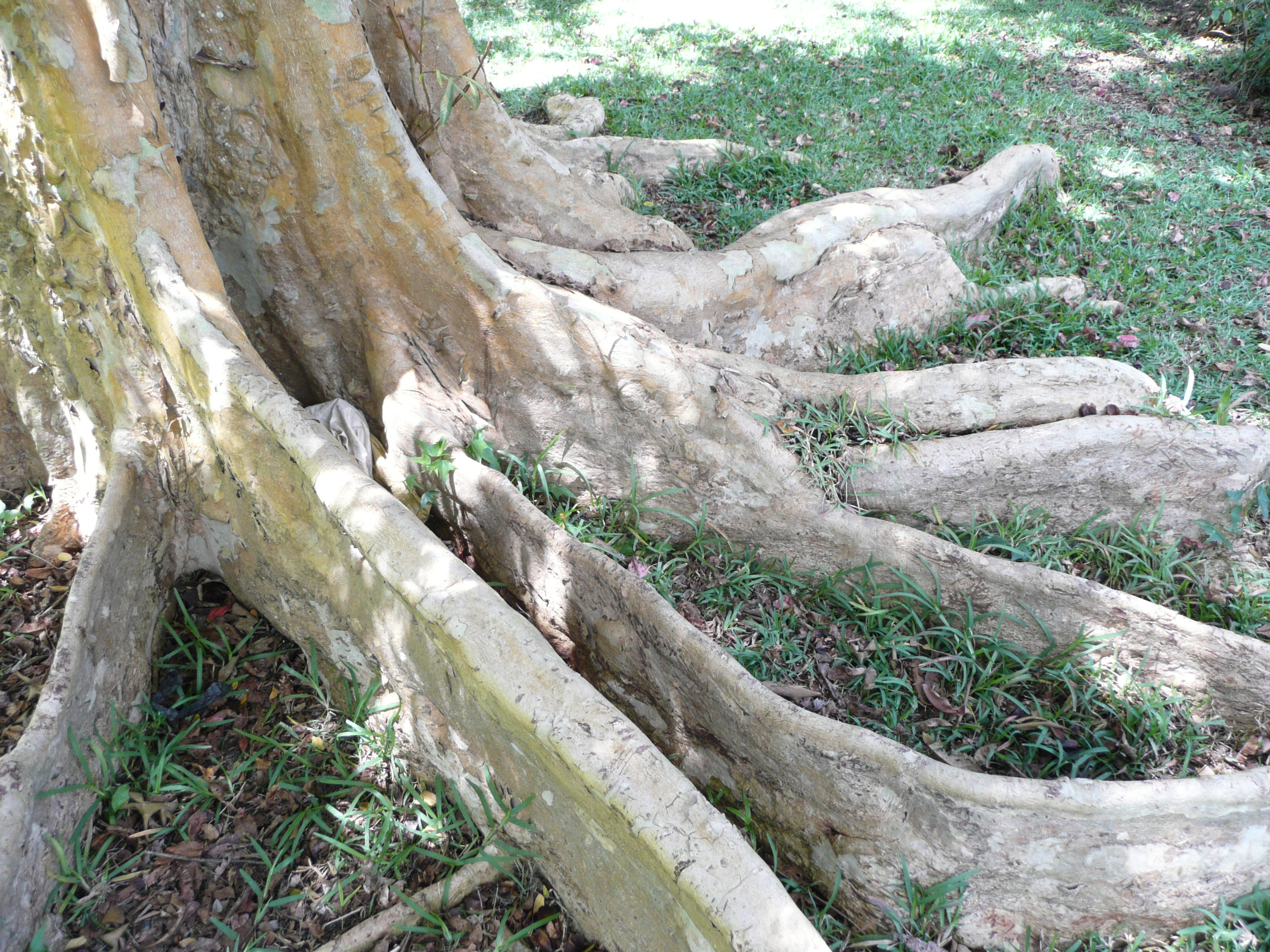
Lower trunk

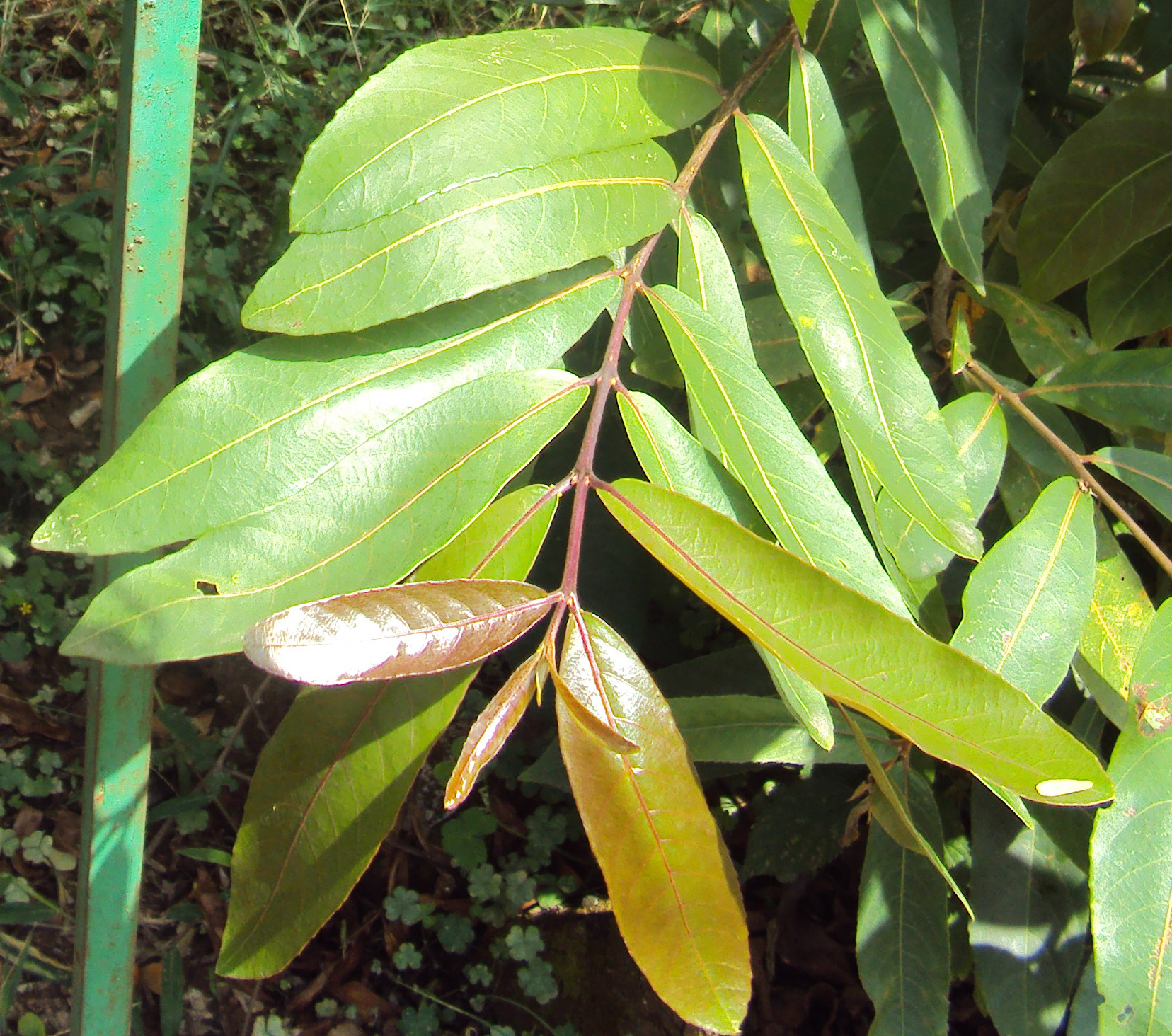
Leaves

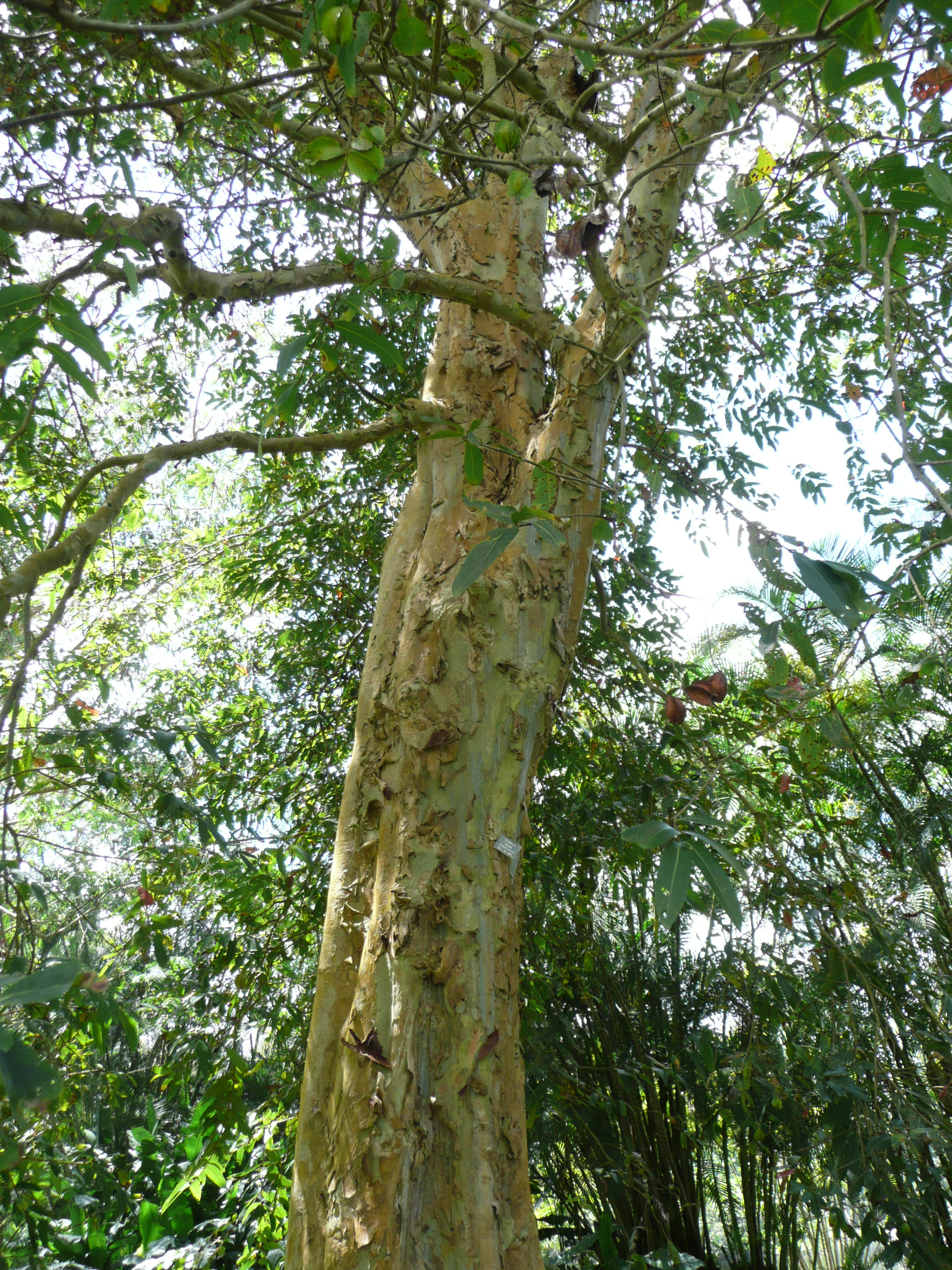
Middle trunk

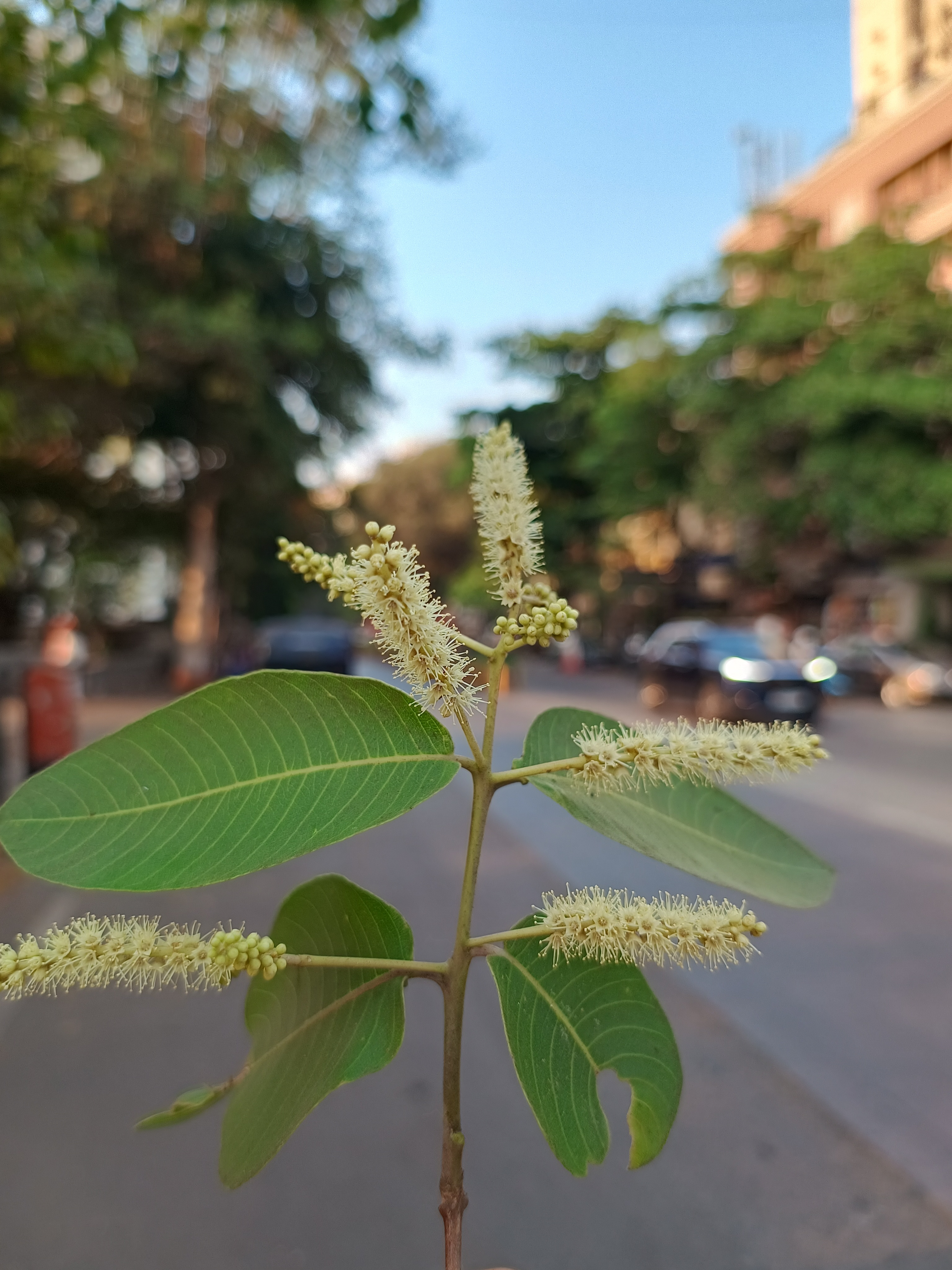
Inflorescence

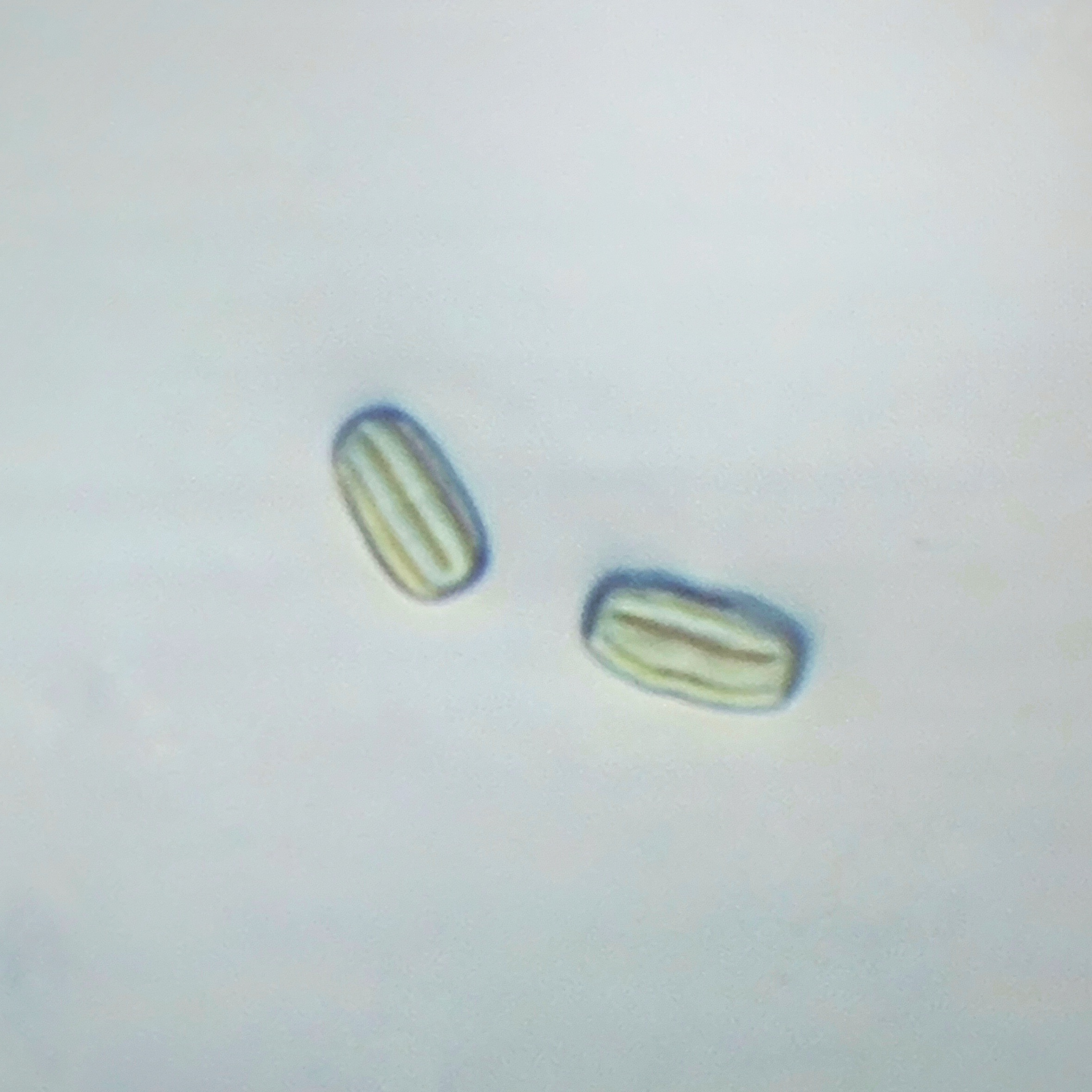
Pollen grains

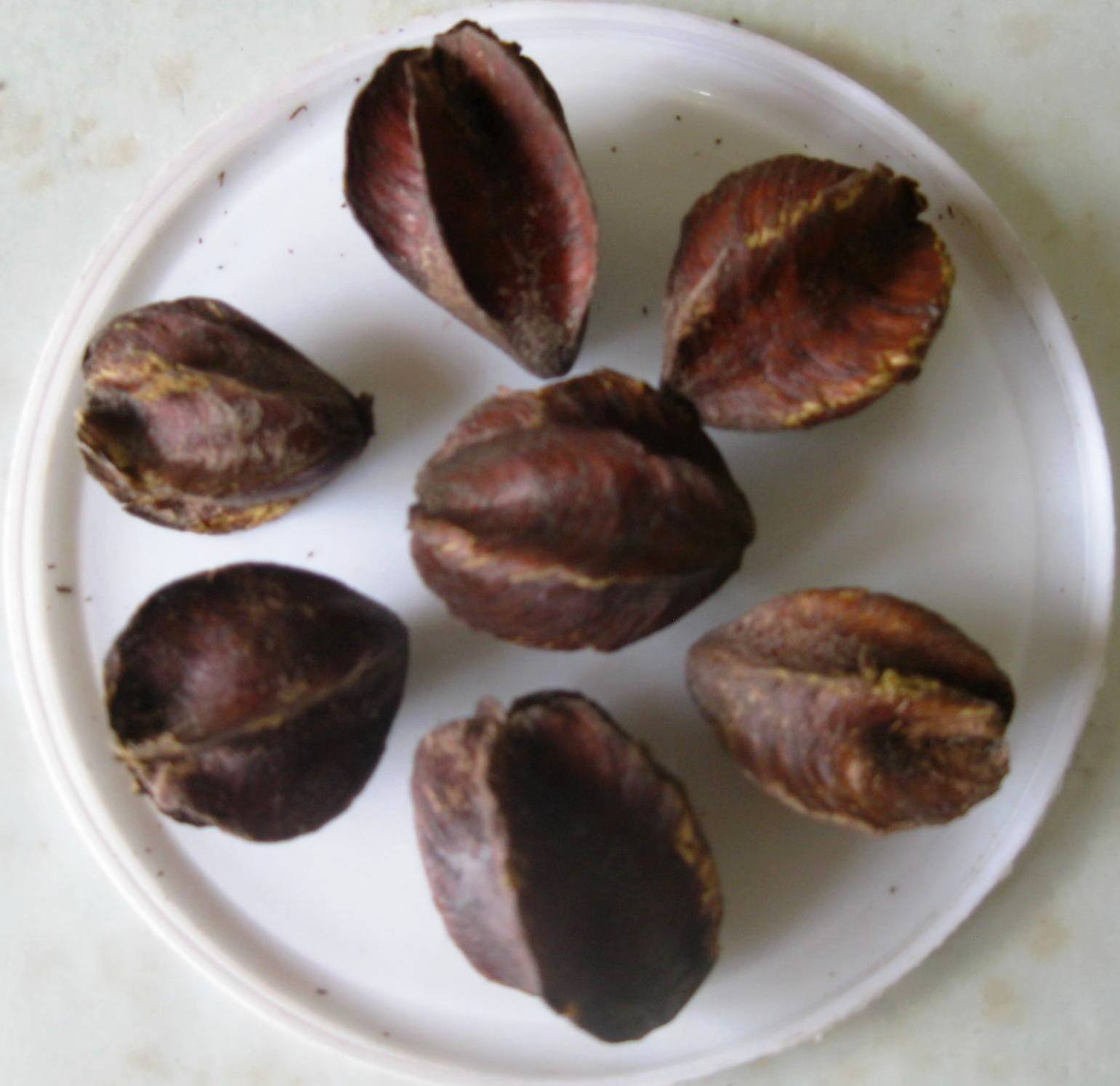
Dried fruits

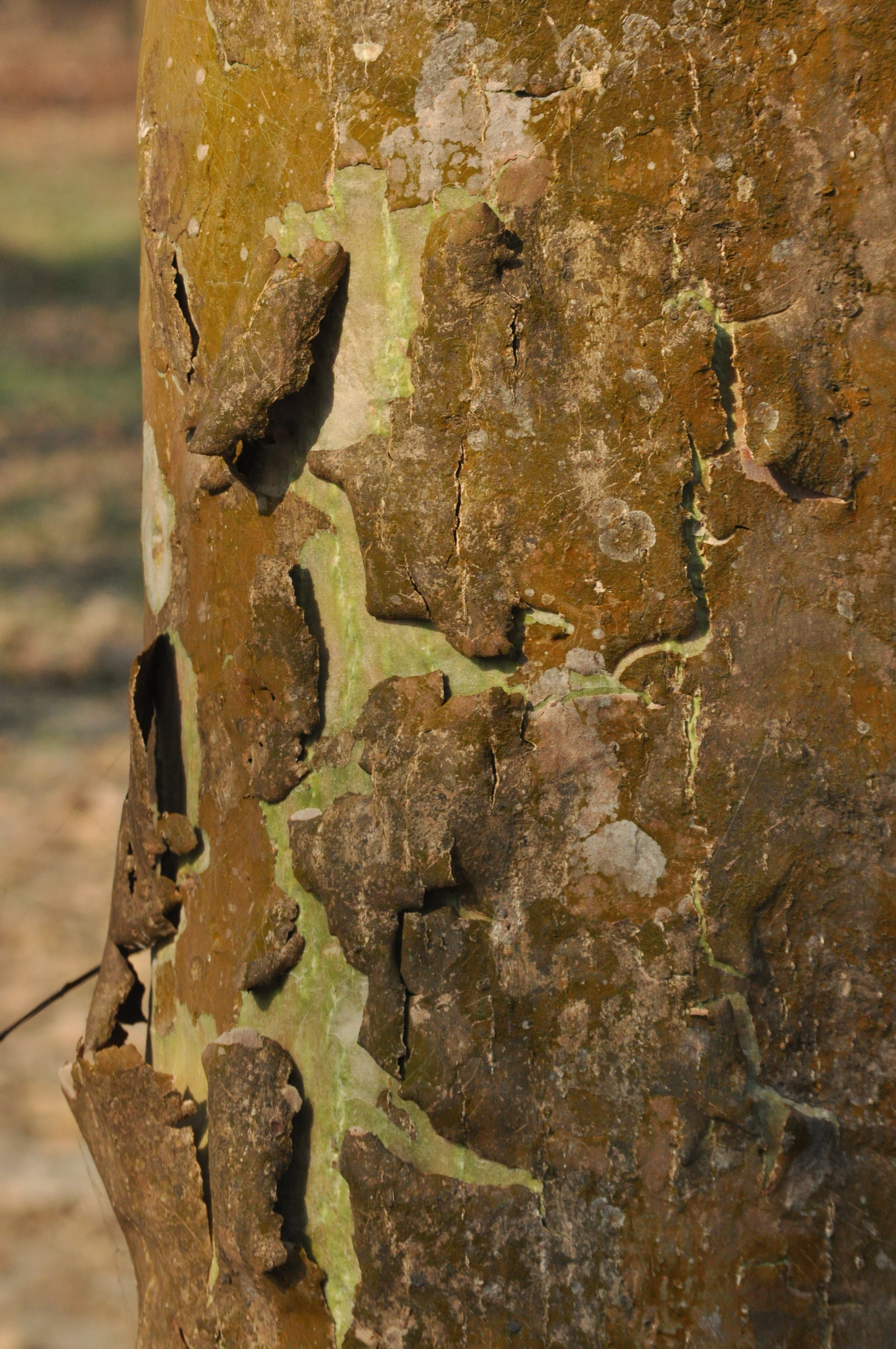
Bark
