= Gambhirnath =

Hindu saint (?-1917)

- Title: Peethadhishwar of Gorakhnath Math

Personal life
- Born: Kashmir region, India
- Died: March 21, 1917
- Known for: Contributions to Yoga and knowledge

Religious life
- Religion: Hinduism
- Denomination: Guru Gorakhnath tradition
- Order: Nath

Religious career
- Teacher: Mahant Baba Gopaldas
- Successor: Digvijay Nath

Baba Gambhirnath (died 1917) was an Indian Hindu saint of the Guru Gorakhnath tradition, who was known for his contributions to Yoga and knowledge. He served as the Peethadhishwar (head) of Gorakhnath Math, a temple of the Nath monastic order within the Nath tradition. He was revered as a great Siddhapurush (perfect man) of the 20th century within the Nath sect. He was the guru of Digvijay Nath.

== Life ==
Gambhirnath was born in a village in the Kashmir region, into a wealthy family.

It is believed that he attained perfection in all three forms of yoga. In his youth, Gambhirnath started his spiritual journey, seeking guidance from Gorakhnath Math. There, he studied under the guidance of Mahant Baba Gopaldas, who taught him yoga. He wholeheartedly dedicated himself to yoga and meditation, spending time along the banks of the Ganges in Varanasi.

He meditated for a period of three years in a cave in Jhusi, Prayagraj. He did penance while staying in Amarkantak. He did spiritual practice for a long time in Kapildhara and Gaya. He conducted in-depth studies of various Hindu religious texts. He undertook a pilgrimage to Kailash Mansarovar, where he had the opportunity to meet and seek inspiration from numerous yogis. He revived the yoga principle of the Nath Sampradaya. He spent a third of his time in Bengal and made a large number of disciples.

Gambhirnath died on March 21, 1917. His Samadhi temple is built within the premises of Gorakhnath Temple in Gorakhpur.

== Legacy ==
The postal department of the Indian government issued a special cover in April 2016 to commemorate the centenary year of the death anniversary of Gambhirnath. Ward number 5 of Gorakhpur Municipal Corporation is officially named after Baba Gambhirnath.

The Government of Uttar Pradesh, under the leadership of Chief Minister Yogi Adityanath, has established an auditorium and cultural center in the Gorakhpur district. This cultural center is named after Gambhirnath, known as the Yogiraj Baba Gambhirnath Auditorium and Cultural Centre, which is under the management of the state's Department of Culture. It features two auditoriums, providing a platform for various cultural activities and events.

A biography titled Aadarsh Yogi: Shri Shri Yogiraj Baba Gambhirnath was written in the Bengali language by Akshay Banerjee. It was launched in April 2016. The Hindi textbook for the 7th standard in the Uttar Pradesh State Board of High School and Intermediate Education includes a chapter that covers Gambhirnath.

== See also ==
- List of Hindu gurus and sants
- Yogi Adityanath
- Mahant Avaidyanath
