= Gorakhpur Lok Sabha constituency =

Constituency in Uttar Pradesh, India

Coordinates: 26.76°N 83.39°E

Gorakhpur UP-53
- Lok Sabha constituency
- Interactive Map Outlining Gorakhpur Lok Sabha constituency

Constituency details
- Country: India
- Region: North India
- State: Uttar Pradesh
- Assembly constituencies: Caimpiyarganj; Pipraich; Gorakhpur Urban; Gorakhpur Rural; Sahajanwa
- Established: 1952
- Reservation: None

Member of Parliament
- 18th Lok Sabha
- Incumbent Ravi Kishan
- Party: BJP
- Alliance: NDA
- Elected year: 2024

Gorakhpur is a Lok Sabha parliamentary constituency in Uttar Pradesh, India. The current member of Lok Sabha is Ravi Kishan, who has won the election as a BJP party candidate in 2024.

This constituency is considered a stronghold of Gorakhnath Math, three of whose presiding monks have been elected from it multiple times.

== Vidhan Sabha constituencies ==
There are five Vidhan Sabha (legislative assembly) segments under this Lok Sabha constituency. These are:

No	Name	District	Member	Party	2024 Lead
320	Caimpiyarganj	Gorakhpur	Fateh Bahadur Singh	BJP	BJP
321	Pipraich	Gorakhpur	Mahendra Pal Singh	BJP	BJP
322	Gorakhpur Urban	Gorakhpur	Yogi Adityanath	BJP	BJP
323	Gorakhpur Rural	Gorakhpur	Bipin Singh	BJP	BJP
324	Sahajanwa	Gorakhpur	Pradeep Shukla	BJP	BJP

== Members of Lok Sabha ==
Year	Member	Party
1952	Sinhasan Singh	Indian National Congress
1957	Sinhasan Singh	Indian National Congress
1957	Mahadeo Prasad	Indian National Congress
1962	Sinhasan Singh	Indian National Congress
1967	Mahant Digvijaynath	Independent
1970^	Mahant Digvijaynath	Independent
1971	Narsingh Narain Pandey	Indian National Congress
1977	Harikesh Bahadur	Janata Party
1980	Harikesh Bahadur	Indian National Congress
1984	Madan Pandey	Indian National Congress
1989	Yogi Adityanath	Akhil Bharatiya Hindu Mahasabha
1991	Yogi Adityanath	Bharatiya Janata Party
1996	Yogi Adityanath	Bharatiya Janata Party
1998	Yogi Adityanath	Bharatiya Janata Party
1999	Yogi Adityanath	Bharatiya Janata Party
2004	Yogi Adityanath	Bharatiya Janata Party
2009	Yogi Adityanath	Bharatiya Janata Party
2014	Yogi Adityanath	Bharatiya Janata Party
2018^	Praveen Nishad	Samajwadi Party
2019	Ravi Kishan	Bharatiya Janata Party
2024	Ravi Kishan	Bharatiya Janata Party

^By Election in 1970 & 2018.

== Election results ==
Vote share of winning candidates
2024	50.75%
2019	60.54%
2018 (by-election)	48.86%
2014	51.83%
2009	53.85%
2004	51.31%
1999	41.10%
1998	42.62%
1996	42.23%
1991	49.70%
1989	42.75%

=== 2024 Lok Sabha elections ===
2024 Indian general elections: Gorakhpur
Party	Candidate	Votes	%	±%
BJP	Ravi Kishan	585,834	50.75	▼9.79
SP	Kajal Nishad	482,308	41.78	▲6.71
BSP	Javed Simnani	55,781	4.83	▲4.83
NOTA	None of the above	7,681	0.67	▲0.02
Majority		103,526	8.97	▼16.50
Turnout		1,154,413	55.05	▼4.74
BJP hold		Swing		

=== 2019 Lok Sabha elections ===
2019 Indian general elections: Gorakhpur
Party	Candidate	Votes	%	±%
BJP	Ravi Kishan	717,122	60.54	+14.01
SP	Rambhual Nishad	415,458	35.07	−13.79
INC	Madhusudan Tripathi	22,972	1.94	−0.08
NOTA	None of the Above	7,688	0.65	−0.24
Majority		301,664	25.47	+23.14
Turnout		1,184,635	59.79	+12.00
BJP gain from SP		Swing	+11.68	

==== 2018 bye-election ====
Bye-election, 2018: Gorakhpur
Party	Candidate	Votes	%	±%
SP	Praveen Kumar Nishad	456,589	48.86	+27.10
BJP	Upendra Dutt Shukla	434,788	46.53	−5.30
INC	Dr. Surheeta Kareem	18,872	2.02	−2.38
NOTA	None of the Above	8,331	0.89	+0.11
Majority		21,801	2.33	−27.74
Turnout		934,441	47.79	−6.84
SP gain from BJP		Swing	-2.97	

=== 2014 Lok Sabha elections ===
2014 Indian general elections: Gorakhpur
Party	Candidate	Votes	%	±%
BJP	Yogi Adityanath	539,127	51.83	−2.02
SP	Rajmati Nishad	2,26,344	21.76	+10.67
BSP	Ram Bhuwal Nishad	1,76,412	16.96	−7.47
INC	Astbhuja Prasad Tripathi	45,719	4.40	+0.36
AAP	Radhe Mohan Misra	11,873	1.14	N/A
NOTA	None of the Above	8,153	0.78	N/A
Majority		3,12,783	30.07	+0.65
Turnout		10,40,199	54.63	+10.50
BJP hold		Swing	-2.02	

=== 2009 Lok Sabha elections ===
2009 Indian general elections: Gorakhpur
Party	Candidate	Votes	%	±%
BJP	Yogi Adityanath	403,156	53.85	+2.34
BSP	Vinay Shankar Tiwari	182,885	24.43	+14.21
SP	Manoj Tiwari	83,059	11.09	−19.61
INC	Lalchand Nishad	30,262	4.04	−0.82
Majority		220,271	29.42	+8.81
Turnout		748,617	44.13	−4.00
BJP hold		Swing	+2.34	

=== 2004 Lok Sabha elections ===
General Election, 2004: Gorakhpur
Party	Candidate	Votes	%	±%
BJP	Yogi Adityanath	353,647	51.31	+10.21
SP	Jamuna Prasad Nishad	2,11,608	30.70	−9.27
BSP	Pradeep Kumar Nishad	70,449	10.22	−4.21
INC	Shardendu Pandey	33,477	4.86	+1.78
Independent	Ram Milan	8,785	1.27	0
AD(K)	Chandra Bhan Singh Patel	3,225	0.47	0
SBSP	Gopal Rajbhar	3,081	0.45	0
Independent	Ram Kishum	2,716	0.39	0
ABHM	Mahanth Ramdas Brahmchari	2,260	0.33	0
Majority		1,42,309	20.61	+19.48
Turnout		6,89,248	48.13	−3.45
BJP hold		Swing	+10.21	

=== 1999 Lok Sabha elections ===
General Election, 1999: Gorakhpur
Party	Candidate	Votes	%	±%
BJP	Yogi Adityanath	267,382	41.10	
SP	Jamuna Prasad Nishad	2,60,043	39.97	
BSP	D. P. Yadav	93,852	13.43	
INC	Dr. Jamal Ahmad	20,026	3.08	
JD(S)	Bankey Lal	2,723	0.42	
Majority		7,339	1.13	
Turnout		6,50,545	51.58	
BJP hold		Swing		

=== 1998 Lok Sabha elections ===
General Election, 1998: Gorakhpur
Party	Candidate	Votes	%	±%
BJP	Yogi Adityanath	268,428	42.62	
SP	Jamuna Prasad Nishad	2,42,222	38.46	
BSP	Prahlad Yadav	85,282	13.54	
INC	Harikesh Bahadur	22,621	3.59	
AD(K)	Sant Lal Jaiswal	3,892	0.62	
Majority		26,206	4.16	
Turnout		6,29,765	50.53	
BJP hold		Swing		

=== 1996 Lok Sabha elections ===
General Election, 1996: Gorakhpur
Party	Candidate	Votes	%	±%
BJP	Mahant Avedyanath	236,369	42.23	
SP	Virender Pratap Shahi	1,79,489	32.07	
BSP	Kedar Nath Singh	85,248	15.23	
INC	Harikesh Bahadur	14,549	2.60	
IND.	Manoj Kumar Singh	4,395	0.79	
Majority		56,880	10.16	
Turnout		5,59,700	45.69	
BJP hold		Swing		

=== 1991 Lok Sabha elections ===
General Election, 1991: Gorakhpur
Party	Candidate	Votes	%	±%
BJP	Mahant Avedyanath	228,736	49.70	
JD	Sharda Prasad Rawat	1,37,377	29.85	
IND	Narsingh Narayan Pandey	38,376	8.34	
JP	Deep Narain Yadav	32,346	7.03	
LKD	Safatullah	6,766	1.47	
Majority		91,359	19.85	
Turnout		4,60,188	50.95	
BJP gain from HM		Swing		

=== 1989 Lok Sabha elections ===
General Election, 1989: Gorakhpur
Party	Candidate	Votes	%	±%
HM	Mahant Avedyanath	193,821	42.75	
JD	Rampal Singh	1,47,984	32.64	
INC	Madan Pande	58,319	12.86	
BSP	Shah Jahan	40,152	8.86	
DDP	Vijai Narain	6,353	1.40	
Majority		45,837	10.11	
Turnout		4,53,341	54.77	
HM gain from INC		Swing		

=== 1971 Lok Sabha elections ===
- Narsingh Narian (INC) : 136,843 votes
- Avedh Nath (Ind) : 99,265 votes

=== 1967 Lok Sabha elections ===
- Digvijai Nath (IND) : 121,490 votes
- S. L. Saxena (Cong) : 78,775 votes

==== 1970 Bye-election ====
- Avedya Nath (IND) : 57,001 votes
- B Chaturvedi (NCJ): 37,064 votes

=== 1962 Lok Sabha elections ===
- Sinhasan Singh (INC) : 68,258 votes
- Digvijai Nath (HMS) : 64,998 votes

== See also ==
- Gorakhpur
- List of constituencies of the Lok Sabha
