= Maniram Assembly constituency =

Former constituency of the Uttar Pradesh legislative assembly in India

Coordinates: 26.85°N 83.34°E

Maniram

Constituency details
- Country: India
- Region: North India
- State: Uttar Pradesh
- District: Gorakhpur
- Lok Sabha constituency: Gorakhpur (Lok Sabha Constituency)

Maniram (Vidhan Sabha constituency) was one of the 425 Vidhan Sabha (Legislative Assembly) constituencies of Uttar Pradesh state in central India. It was a part of the Gorakhpur district and one of the assembly constituencies in the Gorakhpur Lok Sabha constituency. Maniram Assembly constituency came into existence in 1962 and ceased to exist in 2008 as a result of the Delimitation of Parliamentary and Assembly Constituencies Order, 2008.

== Members of Vidhan Sabha ==
Year	Member	Party
1957	Keshav Pandey	Indian National Congress
1962	Mahant Avaidyanath	Hindu Mahasabha
1967	Mahant Avaidyanath	Hindu Mahasabha
1969	Mahant Avaidyanath	Hindu Mahasabha
1972^	R. K. Dwivedi	Indian National Congress
1974	Mahant Avaidyanath	Hindu Mahasabha
1977	Mahant Avaidyanath	Janata Party
1980	Haridwar Pandey	Indian National Congress (I)
1985	Bhrigunath Bhatt	Indian National Congress
1989	Om Prakash Paswan	Hindu Mahasabha
1991	Om Prakash Paswan	Bharatiya Janata Party
1993	Om Prakash Paswan	Bharatiya Janata Party
1996	Chandresh Paswan	Samajwadi Party
2002	Kamlesh Paswan	Samajwadi Party
2007	Vijay Bahadur Yadav	Bharatiya Janata Party
2012 onwards : See Gorakhpur Rural

== See also ==
- Gorakhpur
- Gorakhpur (Lok Sabha constituency)
- Maniram
- Uttar Pradesh
