= Madan Pandey =

Indian politician

Member of Parliament, Lok Sabha
- In office 1984–1989
- Preceded by: Harikesh Bahadur
- Succeeded by: Mahant Avedyanath
- Constituency: Gorakhpur

Personal details
- Born: 1 July 1917
- Party: Indian National Congress
- Spouse: Mani Devi

Madan Pandey is an Indian politician. He was elected to the Lok Sabha, lower house of the Parliament of India as a member of the Indian National Congress.
