= Korakkar =

Siddhar in Tamil tradition

In the Siddhar tradition of Tamil Nadu, Korakkar is one of the 18 esteemed Siddhars of yore, and is better known as Gorakhnath in North India. Siddhar Agastya and Siddhar Bhogar were his gurus. There is a temple in Vadukku Poigainallur, Nagapattinam, Tamil Nadu which specifically houses his Jeeva Samadhi. According to one account, he spent much of his youth in the Velliangiri Mountains, Coimbatore.

There are various other shrines in respect of Korakkar; located in Perur, Thiruchendur and Trincomalee, to name a few. Korakkar Caves are found in both Sathuragiri and the Kolli Hills, where he is noted to have practiced his sadhana. Like his colleagues, the 18 Siddhars, Korakkar also penned much cryptic Tamil poetry pertaining to Medicine, Philosophy and Alchemy. He was one of the first to use Cannabis in his medicinal preparations for certain ailments, and as such the plant has another less well known name, Korakkar Mooligai (Korakkar's Herb).

His works include Korakkar Malai Vagatam (Korakkar's Mountain Medicines), Malai Vaakadam, Korakkar Vaippu, Kaalamegam, Marali Varadham, Nilaiyodukam, and Chandhira Regai Nool.

In his book, the Chandhira Regai Nool, Korakkar has written down, in the form of poetry, his predictions of the future. He made a prediction, in which Siddhar Bhogar will take a further human birth, when the people of this world lose their faith in the supreme consciousness.
