= Pipraich Assembly constituency =

Constituency of the Uttar Pradesh legislative assembly in India

Coordinates: 26.83°N 83.53°E

Pipraich
- Constituency No. 321 for the Uttar Pradesh Legislative Assembly

Constituency details
- Country: India
- Region: North India
- State: Uttar Pradesh
- District: Gorakhpur
- Lok Sabha constituency: Gorakhpur Lok Sabha constituency
- Total electors: 3,86,459 (2017)
- Reservation: None

Member of Legislative Assembly
- 18th Uttar Pradesh Legislative Assembly
- Incumbent Mahendra Pal Singh
- Party: Bharatiya Janta Party
- Elected year: 2017

Pipraich is a constituency of the Uttar Pradesh Legislative Assembly covering the city of Pipraich in the Gorakhpur district of Uttar Pradesh, India.

Pipraich is one of five assembly constituencies in the Gorakhpur Lok Sabha constituency. Since 2008, this assembly constituency is numbered 321 amongst 403 constituencies.

== Members of the Legislative Assembly ==
Year	Member	Party
1957	Achhaiber Singh	Indian National Congress
1962	Achhaiber Singh	Indian National Congress
1967	Madhukar Dighe	Samyukta Socialist Party
1969	Hari Prasad Shahi	Indian National Congress
1974	Madhukar Dighe	Bharatiya Kranti Dal
1977	Madhukar Dighe	Janata Party
1980	Kedar Nath Singh	Indian National Congress (U)
1985	Sayed Javed Ali	Indian National Congress
1989	Kedar Nath Singh	Janata Dal
1991	Lallan Prasad Tripathi	Bharatiya Janata Party
1993	Jitendra Jaiswal	Independent
1996	Jitendra Jaiswal	Independent
2002	Jitendra Jaiswal	Independent
2007	Jamuna Nishad	Bahujan Samaj Party
2010^	Rajmati Nishad	Samajwadi Party
2012	Rajmati Nishad	Samajwadi Party
2017	Mahendra Pal Singh	Bharatiya Janata Party
2022	Mahendra Pal Singh	Bharatiya Janata Party

== Election results ==
=== 2027 ===
2027 Uttar Pradesh Legislative Assembly election: Pipraich
Party	Candidate	Votes	%	±%
NDA				
INDIA				
BSP				
NOTA	None of the above			
Majority				
Turnout				
gain from		Swing		

=== 2022 ===
2022 Uttar Pradesh Legislative Assembly election: Pipraich
Party	Candidate	Votes	%	±%
BJP	Mahendra Pal Singh	141,780	54.86	▲21.23
SP	Amrendra Nishad	76,423	29.57	▲8.83
BSP	Deepak Kumar Agarwal	30,954	11.98	▼16.45
NOTA	None of the above	1,313	0.51	▲0.02
Majority		65,357	25.29	▲20.09
Turnout		258,442	63.53	▼0.13
BJP hold		Swing		

=== 2017 ===
Bharatiya Janta Party candidate Mahendra Pal Singh won in last Assembly election of 2017 Uttar Pradesh Legislative Elections defeating Bahujan Samaj Party candidate Aftab Alam by a margin of 12,809 votes.

2017 Assembly Elections: Pipraich
Party	Candidate	Votes	%	±%
BJP	Mahendra Pal Singh	82,739	33.63	
BSP	Afatab Alam Urf Guddu	69,930	28.43	
SP	Amrendra Nishad	51,031	20.74	
Independent	Anita Jaiswal	31,073	12.63	
NOTA	None of the above	1,204	0.49	
Majority		12,809	5.2	
Turnout		246,015	63.66	
BJP gain from SP		Swing	▼9.70	

=== 2012 ===
2012 Assembly Elections: Pipraich
Party	Candidate	Votes	%	±%
SP	Rajmati Nishad	86,976	43.50	Steady
BSP	Jitendra	51,341	25.68	Steady
BJP	Radheshyam	29,617	14.81	Steady
SBSP	Dildar Husain	5,948	2.97	Steady
INC	Amarjeet	4,449	2.23	Steady
RSBP	Mohd Mainuddin	3,700	1.85	Steady
JD(U)	Lalji	2,757	1.38	Steady
Independent	Sarvajit	1,412	0.71	Steady
PECP	Surendra Kumar	1,149	0.57	Steady
	Remaining 21 Candidates	12,596	6.30	Steady
Majority		35,635	17.82	Steady
Turnout		1,99,945	59.72	Steady
SP hold		Swing		
