= Babu Nagawa =

Babu Nagwa
- Village
- Location in Uttar Pradesh, India
- Coordinates: 26.451°N 83.134°E
- Country: India
- State: Uttar Pradesh
- District: Gorakhpur

Languages
  - Official: Hindi
- Time zone: UTC+5:30 (IST)
- PIN: 273411
- Telephone code: +91-551
- Vehicle registration: UP 53
- Sex ratio: 1000/944 ♂/♀
- Avg. annual temperature: 26 °C (79 °F)
- Avg. summer temperature: 40 °C (104 °F)
- Avg. winter temperature: 18 °C (64 °F)

Babu Nagwa is a village located in the Gorakhpur district of Uttar Pradesh, India. Lucknow is the state capital for Babu Nagwa village, located 406.9 kilometres (252.8 mi) away from Babu Nagwa. Arjun Singh Srinet Born here.
