= Bhauwapar =

Coordinates: 26°40′N 83°22′E

Bhauwapar is a village in the Gorakhpur district, Uttar Pradesh in India, near the border with Nepal. It is situated 15 km (9.3 mi) from Gorakhpur city. The ancient Mungeshwar nath temple is the heritage of Bhauwapar.
