= Caimpiyarganj Assembly constituency =

Constituency of the Uttar Pradesh legislative assembly in India

Coordinates: 27.03°N 83.27°E

Caimpiyarganj
- Constituency No. 320 for the Uttar Pradesh Legislative Assembly

Constituency details
- Country: India
- Region: North India
- State: Uttar Pradesh
- District: Gorakhpur
- Total electors: 3,83,702
- Reservation: None

Member of Legislative Assembly
- 18th Uttar Pradesh Legislative Assembly
- Incumbent Fateh Bahadur Singh
- Party: Bharatiya Janta Party
- Elected year: 2022

Caimpiyarganj is a constituency of the Uttar Pradesh Legislative Assembly covering the city of Caimpiyarganj in the Gorakhpur district of Uttar Pradesh, India. It is one of five assembly constituencies in the Gorakhpur Lok Sabha constituency. Since 2008, this assembly constituency is numbered 320 amongst 403 constituencies.

== Member of the Legislative Assembly ==
Year	Member	Party
Till 2012 : Constituency did not exist
2012	Fateh Bahadur Singh	Nationalist Congress Party
2017	Fateh Bahadur Singh	Bhartiya Janata Party
2022	Fateh Bahadur Singh	Bhartiya Janata Party

== Election results ==
=== 2027 ===
2027 Uttar Pradesh Legislative Assembly election: Caimpiyarganj
Party	Candidate	Votes	%	±%
NDA				
INDIA				
BSP				
NOTA	None of the above			
Majority				
Turnout				
gain from		Swing		

=== 2022 ===
2022 Uttar Pradesh Legislative Assembly election: Caimpiyarganj
Party	Candidate	Votes	%	±%
BJP	Fateh Bahadur Singh	122,032	54.38	▲12.09
SP	Kajal Nishad	79,376	35.37	
BSP	Chandra Prakash Nishad	13,153	5.86	▼12.25
INC	Atal Bihari Singh	2,592	1.16	▼25.96
NOTA	None of the above	1,155	0.51	▼0.33
Majority		42,656	19.01	▲3.84
Turnout		224,393	58.48	▼1.02
BJP hold		Swing		

=== 2017 ===
The MLA is Bharatiya Janta Party candidate Fateh Bahadur Singh who won in the 2017 Uttar Pradesh Legislative Assembly election defeating Indian National Congress candidate Chinta Yadav by a margin of 32,854 votes.

2017 Uttar Pradesh Legislative Assembly election: Caimpiyarganj
Party	Candidate	Votes	%	±%
BJP	Fateh Bahadur	91,636	42.29	
INC	Chinta Yadav	58,782	27.12	
BSP	Ananda Nishad	39,243	18.11	
NISHAD	Mohammad Mainuddin	10,935	5.05	
RLD	Gorakh Singh	7,265	3.35	
NOTA	None of the above	1,806	0.84	
Majority		32,854	15.17	
Turnout		216,710	59.5	
BJP gain from NCP		Swing		
