= Sahajanwa Assembly constituency =

Assembly constituency in Uttar Pradesh, India

Coordinates: 26.75°N 83.22°E

Sahajanwa
- Constituency No. 324 for the Uttar Pradesh Legislative Assembly

Constituency details
- Country: India
- Region: North India
- State: Uttar Pradesh
- District: Gorakhpur
- Total electors: 3,79,627
- Reservation: None

Member of Legislative Assembly
- 18th Uttar Pradesh Legislative Assembly
- Incumbent Pradeep Shukla
- Party: Bharatiya Janta Party
- Elected year: 2022

Sahajanwa is a constituency of the Uttar Pradesh Legislative Assembly covering the city of Sahajanwa in the Gorakhpur district of Uttar Pradesh, India. It is one of five assembly constituencies in the Gorakhpur Lok Sabha constituency. Since 2008, this assembly constituency is numbered 324 amongst 403 constituencies.

== Members of the Legislative Assembly ==
| Year | Member | Party |
|---|---|---|
| 1967 | Ram Karan | Praja Socialist Party |
| 1969 | Ram Karan | Praja Socialist Party |
| 1974 | Sharda Prasad Rawat | Bharatiya Kranti Dal |
| 1977 | Sharda Prasad Rawat | Janata Party |
| 1980 | Kishori Shukla | Indian National Congress (I) |
| 1985 | Triyugi Narain Mishra | Indian National Congress |
| 1989 | Sharda Prasad Rawat | Janata Dal |
| 1991 | Tarkeshwar Prasad Shukla | Bharatiya Janata Party |
| 1993 | Prabha Rawat | Samajwadi Party |
| 1996 | Tarkeshwar Prasad Shukla | Bharatiya Janata Party |
| 2002 | Dev Narayan Singh | Bahujan Samaj Party |
| 2007 | Yashpal Singh Ravat | Independent |
| 2012 | Rajendra | Bahujan Samaj Party |
| 2017 | Sheetal Pandey | Bharatiya Janata Party |
| 2022 | Pradeep Shukla | Bharatiya Janata Party |

== Election results ==
=== 2027 ===
2027 Uttar Pradesh Legislative Assembly election: Sahajanwa
| Party | Candidate | Votes | % | ±% |
|---|---|---|---|---|
| NDA | | | | |
| INDIA | | | | |
| BSP | | | | |
| NOTA | None of the above | | | |
| Majority | | | | |
| Turnout | | | | |
| gain from | | Swing | | |

=== 2022 ===
2022 Uttar Pradesh Legislative Assembly election: Sahajanwa
| Party | Candidate | Votes | % | ±% |
|---|---|---|---|---|
| BJP | Pradeep Shukla | 105,981 | 47.21 | ▲12.72 |
| SP | Yashpal Singh Rawat | 62,575 | 27.87 | ▲0.73 |
| BSP | Sudhir Singh | 43,905 | 19.56 | ▼6.3 |
| INC | Manoj Yadav | 3,338 | 1.49 | |
| NOTA | None of the above | 1,604 | 0.71 | ▼0.12 |
| Majority | | 43,406 | 19.34 | ▲11.99 |
| Turnout | | 224,489 | 59.13 | ▲0.34 |
| BJP hold | | Swing | | |

=== 2017 ===
Bharatiya Janta Party candidate Sheetal Pandey won in the 2017 Uttar Pradesh Legislative Assembly election defeating Samajwadi Party candidate Yaspal Singh Rawat by a margin of 15,377 votes.

2017 Uttar Pradesh Legislative Assembly Election: Sahajanw
| Party | Candidate | Votes | % | ±% |
|---|---|---|---|---|
| BJP | Sheetal Pandey | 72,213 | 34.49 | |
| SP | Yaspal Singh Rawat | 56,836 | 27.14 | |
| BSP | Devnarayan Singh Urf G.M. Singh | 54,143 | 25.86 | |
| NISHAD | Shivaji Singh | 15,780 | 7.54 | |
| Shoshit Samaj Dal | Asha Nishad | 2,024 | 0.97 | |
| NOTA | None of the above | 1,723 | 0.83 | |
| Majority | | 15,377 | 7.35 | |
| Turnout | | 209,383 | 58.79 | |
