= Digvijaynath =

Indian politician (1894-1969)

Mahant Digvijaynath

Member of Parliament, Lok Sabha
- In office March 1967 – September 1969
- Preceded by: Sinhasan Singh
- Succeeded by: Mahant Avaidyanath
- Constituency: Gorakhpur

Personal details
- Born: Swaroop Singh; 1894 Kankarwa Thikana, Udaipur State, British India (present-day Udaipur district, Rajasthan)
- Died: 1969 (aged 74–75) Gorakhpur, Uttar Pradesh, India
- Party: Akhil Bharatiya Hindu Mahasabha
- Other political affiliations: Indian National Congress
- Occupation: Politician, monk

Religious life
- Religion: Hinduism
- Denomination: Shaivism
- Temple: Gorakhnath Math
- School: Yoga
- Lineage: Guru Gorakhnath
- Sect: Nath Sampradaya

Religious career
- Teacher: Baba Brahmanath
- Post: Mahant
- Predecessor: Baba Brahmanath
- Successor: Mahant Avaidyanath
- Disciples: Mahant Avaidyanath

Mahant Digvijaynath (born Swaroop Singh Ranawat; 1894–1969) was the mahant (lit. 'head priest'), of the Gorakhnath Math in Gorakhpur, India. He was also a Hindu nationalist activist and a politician of the Hindu Mahasabha, who was arrested for inflaming passions among Hindus against Mahatma Gandhi. Nath played a leading role in the Ram Janmabhoomi movement in 1949, which culminated in the appearance of Rama idols inside the Babri Masjid, in an effort to revive the Hindu Mahasabha after its implication in the Gandhi assassination. Nath was elected as the MP for Gorakhpur in 1967 on a Hindu Mahasabha ticket.

== Early life ==
Digvijaynath was born Swaroop 'Nanhu' Singh in 1894 in Kankarwa Thikana (Mewar) of (Udaipur), Rajasthan in a Viramdevot Ranawat Rajput family. His mother (an Udawat Rathore Rajput from Kundoj, Ajmer) died when he was 8 years old. His father was Rawat Thakur Uday Singhji of Kankarwa, President of the Mewar Presidency Council (Mahendraj Sabha). He was given away to a Nath yogi called Phulnath, who took him to the Gorakhnath Math in Gorakhpur. He grew up in a monastery and went to study at St. Andrews College in Gorakhpur. He was an average student but excelled in sports, especially, hockey, horse-riding, and tennis. In 1920, he left his education to take part in politics.

In 1932, Baba Brahmanath became the mahant of the Gorakhnath Math and initiated him into the Nath tradition. After his death in 1935, the leadership of the math passed to Digvijaynath, who was anointed as the mahant on 15 August 1935. Despite being a mahant, Nath continued his pastime of playing lawn tennis as well as his political activities. The Gorakhnath math is traditionally venerated by both Hindus and Muslims, especially in lower caste communities.

== Religious career ==
Digvijaynath was succeeded by Mahant Avaidyanath as the head of Gorakhnath Math in 1969.

== Political career ==
Digvijaynath joined the Congress in 1920, and participated in the non-cooperation movement in 1922. He was arrested for taking an "active part" in the Chauri Chaura incident where a police station was burnt down, killing 23 policemen, causing Mahatma Gandhi to abort the movement.

Nath joined the Hindu Mahasabha in 1937 when V. D. Savarkar became its President, and rose to become the head of the party in the United Provinces. His status as the mahant of the Gorakhpur Math as well as his political acumen helped him rise fast. He was radically anti-Muslim. He told The Statesman in 1952 that, if the Hindu Mahasabha attained power, it would deprive the Muslims of the right to vote for five to ten years, until they proved "their loyalty to India." He incited Hindus to kill Mahatma Gandhi in a public meeting on 27 January 1948, three days before the actual assassination. He was subsequently arrested, along with Professor Ram Singh and V. G. Deshpande, but released after 9 months.

Soon after his release from prison, Digvijaynath started making plans to revive the Hindu Mahasabha, which had invited the public's revulsion for its role in the assassination of Gandhi. The capture of the Babri Masjid in Ayodhya was a key plank of his plan.

He was elected to Lok Sabha in 1967 General election from Gorakhpur. He died mid-term in 1969.

== See also ==
- Yogi Adityanath
- Mahant Avaidyanath
