= Sheetal Pandey =

Indian politician

MLA in 17th Legislative Assembly of Uttar Pradesh
- In office March 2017 – March 2022
- Preceded by: Rajendra
- Succeeded by: Pradeep Shukla
- Constituency: Sahajanwa

Personal details
- Born: Rajghat, Gorakhpur, Uttar Pradesh, India
- Party: Bharatiya Janata Party
- Education: Graduate from Gorakhpur University
- Occupation: MLA
- Profession: Politician

Sheetal Pandey is an Indian politician and a member of the Bharatiya Janata Party. He is a one-term member of the Uttar Pradesh Legislative Assembly, representing the Sahajanwa constituency in Gorakhpur district of Uttar Pradesh from 2017 to 2022.

== Political career ==
Pandey contested his first election in the 2006 by-election from the Kauriram assembly constituency, Gorakhpur.

He lost that election to the Samajwadi Party candidate Ram Bhuwal Nishad by about 10000 votes.

Pandey had the support of the then Gorakhpur Bharatiya Janata Party Member of parliament and the current Chief Minister of Uttar Pradesh Yogi Adityanath. His loss was attributed to Bharatiya Janata Party rebel Upendra Shukla, who polled about 17,000 votes against Pandey's 41,600 votes, thus dividing the Bharatiya Janata Party vote share. Ram Bhuwal Nishad, who won that election, polled about 52,000 votes. Pandey was given a Bharatiya Janata Party ticket again in 2017 to contest the Uttar Pradesh Legislative Assembly election.

In 2017, aged 63, he was elected for the first time to the Uttar Pradesh Legislative Assembly. He defeated Yashpal Singh Rawat of the Samajwadi Party, securing 72,213 votes; her nearest rival contestants Yashpal Singh Rawat of the Samajwadi Party secured 56,836 votes and Devnarayan Singh Alias GM Singh of the Bahujan Samaj Party secured 54,143 votes.

The division in the vote share between the Samajwadi Party and Bahujan Samaj Party helped Pandey secure a victory margin of about 18,000 votes.

== Posts held ==
| # | From | To | Position | Comments |
|---|---|---|---|---|
| 01 | March 2017 | March 2022 | Member, 17th Legislative Assembly | |
