= Vijay Bahadur Yadav =

Indian politician (born 1969)

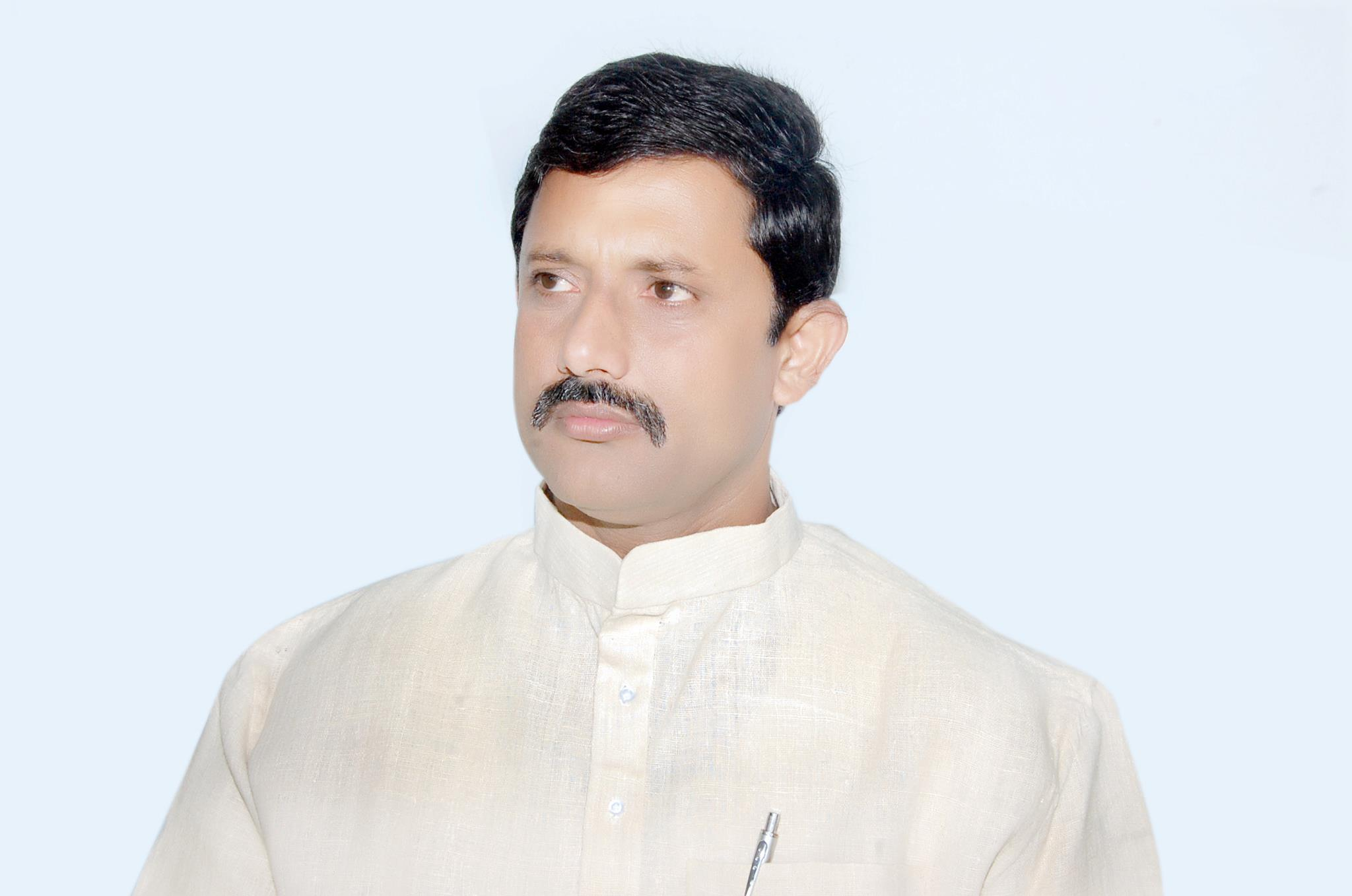

Member (MLA) of Uttar Pradesh Legislative Assembly
- In office 2012–2017
- Preceded by: Constituency established
- Succeeded by: Bipin Singh
- Constituency: Gorakhpur Rural
- In office 2007–2012
- Preceded by: Kamlesh Kumar
- Succeeded by: Constituency abolished
- Constituency: Maniram

Personal details
- Born: 14 September 1969 (age 56) Gorakhpur, Uttar Pradesh, India
- Party: Samajwadi Party (2016–present)
- Other political affiliations: Bharatiya Janata Party (until 2016)
- Spouse: Rambha Devi (m. 1989)
- Children: 3
- Profession: Business

Vijay Bahadur Yadav (born 14 September 1969) is an Indian politician and a member of the 15th and 16th Legislative Assembly of Uttar Pradesh of India. From 2012, he represented Gorakhpur Rural (Assembly constituency) as a member of Samajwadi Party. He represented Maniram (Vidhan Sabha constituency) in 2007–2012 as a Bharatiya Janata Party member.

Yadav in his 10-year tenure has faced no corruption charges and has been fairly active in the legislative assembly, though reports say that his assets doubled in 5 years, also he has 8 criminal cases against him. He has been credited with allotment of university status to Madan Mohan Malaviya University of Technology and has also raised the issue of encephalitis continuously and has secured funds for construction of a new ward in Gorakhpur Medical College.

== Personal life ==
Vijay Bahadur Yadav was born to Rama Shankar Yadav on 14 September 1969 in Gorakhpur, Uttar Pradesh. He studied till intermediate. Vijay B Yadav married Rambha Devi on 7 December 1989, with whom he has two sons and a daughter. He is a businessman by profession.

== Political career ==
- 2007:Elected as member of Legislative Assembly from Maniram, Gorakhpur.
- 2012:Elected as member of legislative Assembly from Gorakhpur Rural.
- 2017:Contested election from Gorakpur Rural, lost by a margin of 4,410 votes.

Yadav started his political journey with Bharatiya Janata Party in 2007, even though he is said to have never aligned with BJP's ideology but on request of Mahant Avaidyanath he agreed to contest on Bharatiya Janata Party ticket. Despite the stiff opposition of Yogi Adityanath in the 2012 election, BJP gave him the ticket, due to which Yogi Adityanath pitted his party Hindu Yuva Vahini candidate against him. However he won the election and emerged as a strong regional leader of Purvanchal. During this period his closeness to Akhilesh Yadav kept growing and in controversial Rajya Sabha elections he voted for Samajwadi Party candidate against BJP. He said he was impressed by the policy making of then chief minister, he resolutely stated "I voted on the basis of development done by the Chief Minister Akhilesh Yadav and I am ready to make any sacrifice". After cross voting in the Rajya Sabha election Bhartiya Janata Party suspended him from the party.

In 2016, he left Bhartiya Janta Party and joined Samajwadi Party.
