= Bipin Singh (politician) =

Indian politician (born 1968)

MLA in Legislative Assembly of Uttar Pradesh
- Incumbent
- Assumed office March 2017
- Preceded by: Vijay Bahadur Yadav
- Constituency: Gorakhpur Rural

Personal details
- Born: 10 March 1968 (age 58) Gorakhpur, Uttar Pradesh, India
- Party: Bharatiya Janata Party
- Education: Gorakhpur University (B.A)
- Occupation: MLA
- Profession: Politician; agriculturalist

Bipin Singh (also rendered as Vipin Singh) is an Indian politician and a member of 17th and 18th Legislative Assembly of Uttar Pradesh of India. He represents the Gorakhpur Rural (Assembly constituency) in Gorakhpur district of Uttar Pradesh and is a member of the Bharatiya Janata Party.

== Personal life ==
Singh was born 10 March 1968 in Gorakhpur of Uttar Pradesh to father Ambika Singh. He graduated with a Bachelor of Arts degree from Gorakhpur University in 1988. Singh married Neeta Singh on 12 July 1992, with whom he has a son and a daughter.

== Political career ==
Singh started his political journey as block pramukh, a post which he held in Kaudiram for 10 consecutive years. In 17th Legislative Assembly of Uttar Pradesh (2017) elections, he got a ticket from the Bharatiya Janata Party from Gorakhpur Rural (Assembly constituency). He was elected MLA by defeating Samajwadi Party candidate Vijay Bahadur Yadav by a margin of 4,410 votes.

In March 2017, Singh resigned to offer his seat to Uttar Pradesh Chief Minister Yogi Adityanath, who needed to become a member of either the Legislative Assembly or the Legislative Council within six months to continue as the Chief Minister of the state.

== Posts held ==
#	From	To	Position	Comments
01	March 2017	March 2022	Member, 17th Legislative Assembly of Uttar Pradesh	
02	March 2022	Incumbent	Member, 18th Legislative Assembly of Uttar Pradesh	
