= Mithabel =

Mithabel is a village in Gorakhpur district of the north-eastern part of the Indian state of Uttar Pradesh, India. It is close to the Nepal border. It has a 1000-years-old history. There are several accounts on the existence of this village however its ancestry can be traced back to the 18th century. According to 2011 Census, it has a population of 6965 according to 2011 census. Maximum people in village works in sugar factory. Approximately 2 or 3 member in one family worked in sugar factory.

Brahmapur, another village nearby, is closely related to Mithabel. It is home to an ancient temple of a "Bramha", Shri Visheshwar Baba, who is one of the ancestors of the inhabitants of this village. There is an old story about this temple and its creation. Baba is considered a deity and a holy figure. The temple has long been a center of devotion for not only the inhabitants of this village but also the ones nearby.

== History ==
Mithabel was a zamindari during British India belonging to the Dubeys, holding 29 villages.
