= Gorakhpur Rural Assembly constituency =

Constituency of the Uttar Pradesh legislative assembly in India

Coordinates: 26.84°N 83.48°E

Gorakhpur Rural
- Constituency No. 323 for the Uttar Pradesh Legislative Assembly

Constituency details
- Country: India
- Region: North India
- State: Uttar Pradesh
- District: Gorakhpur
- Total electors: 3,94,353 (2017)
- Reservation: None

Member of Legislative Assembly
- 18th Uttar Pradesh Legislative Assembly
- Incumbent Bipin Singh
- Party: Bharatiya Janta Party
- Elected year: 2017

Gorakhpur Rural is a constituency of the Uttar Pradesh Legislative Assembly covering the city of Gorakhpur Rural in the Gorakhpur district of Uttar Pradesh, India. It is one of five assembly constituencies in the Gorakhpur Lok Sabha constituency. Since 2008, this assembly constituency is numbered 323 amongst 403 constituencies of the UP Legislative Assembly.

The incumbent MLA is Bharatiya Janta Party's Bipin Singh who won the 2022 UP Assembly election defeating Samajwadi Party candidate Vijay Bahadur Yadav by 24,070 votes.

== Members of the Legislative Assembly ==
Year	Member	Party
Till 2012 : Constituency did not exist
2012	Vijay Bahadur Yadav	Bharatiya Janata Party
2017	Bipin Singh	Bharatiya Janata Party
2022	Bipin Singh	Bharatiya Janata Party

== Election results ==
=== 2027 ===
2027 Uttar Pradesh Legislative Assembly election: Gorakhpur Rural
Party	Candidate	Votes	%	±%
NDA				
INDIA				
BSP				
NOTA	None of the above			
Majority				
Turnout				
gain from		Swing		

=== 2022 ===
2022 Uttar Pradesh Legislative Assembly election: Gorakhpur Rural
Party	Candidate	Votes	%	±%
BJP	Bipin Singh	126,376	49.59	+14.12
SP	Vijay Bahadur Yadav	102,306	40.14	+6.54
BSP	Dara Singh Nishad	15,982	6.27	−6.48
AIMIM	Mohd. Islam	3,519	1.38	
NOTA	None of the above	1,053	0.41	−0.29
Majority		24,070	9.45	+7.58
Turnout		254,865	60.79	+0.95
BJP hold		Swing	13.88	

=== 2017 ===
2017 Uttar Pradesh Legislative Assembly election: Gorakhpur Rural
Party	Candidate	Votes	%	±%
BJP	Bipin Singh	83,686	35.47	
SP	Vijay Bahadur Yadav	79,276	33.6	
NISHAD	Sanjay Kumar Nishad	34,901	14.79	
BSP	Rajesh Pandey	30,097	12.75	
NOTA	None of the above	1,634	0.7	
Majority		4,410	1.87	
Turnout		235,963	59.84	
BJP hold		Swing	+4.40	

=== 2012 ===
2012 Uttar Pradesh Legislative Assembly election: Gorakhpur Rural
Party	Candidate	Votes	%	±%
BJP	Vijay Bahadur Yadav	58,849	31.31	Steady
SP	Jafar Amin Dakku	41,864	22.27	Steady
BSP	Ram Bhuwal Nishad	41,338	21.99	Steady
INC	Kajal	17,636	9.38	Steady
PECP	Chhedi Lal	8,490	4.52	Steady
Majority		16,985	9.04	Steady
Turnout		1,87,979	55.18	Steady
BJP win (new seat)				
