= Rithuakhor =

- Industrial area
- Location in Gida gorakhpur Uttar Pradesh, India
- Coordinates: 26°45′N 83°13′E
- Country: India
- State: Uttar Pradesh
- District: Gorakhpur

Population (2001)
  - Total: 4,091

Languages
  - Official: Hindi
- Time zone: UTC+5:30 (IST)

Rithuakhor is a village and gram panchayat in Sahjanwa tehsil in Gorakhpur district in the Indian state of Uttar Pradesh.This village belongs to majority of (Kashyap Gotriya)janwar kshatriya caste.

== Demographics ==
As of 2001, according to the Indian census, the town had a population of 4091. Males constituted 53% of the population and females 47%. Sahjanwa had an average literacy rate of 57%, lower than the national average of 59.5%; male literacy was 70%, and female literacy was 43%. In Rithuakhor, 17% of the population was under 6 years of age. The primary language in the town, like other towns in eastern Uttar Pradesh, is Bhojpuri.

== Industries ==
Rithuakor has a developing industrial area called GIDA. There are many factories in GIDA including Parle, powerlooms, plywood, and a jute mill (the second operational jute mill in India and the only one in Uttar Pradesh.

== Transport ==
Rithuakhor is near the railway station in Sahjanwa, which is well connected with Lucknow and Gorakhpur. The town also touches National Highway 28.
