= Gorakhnath Math =

Hindu Temple in Gorakhpur district, Uttar Pradesh, India

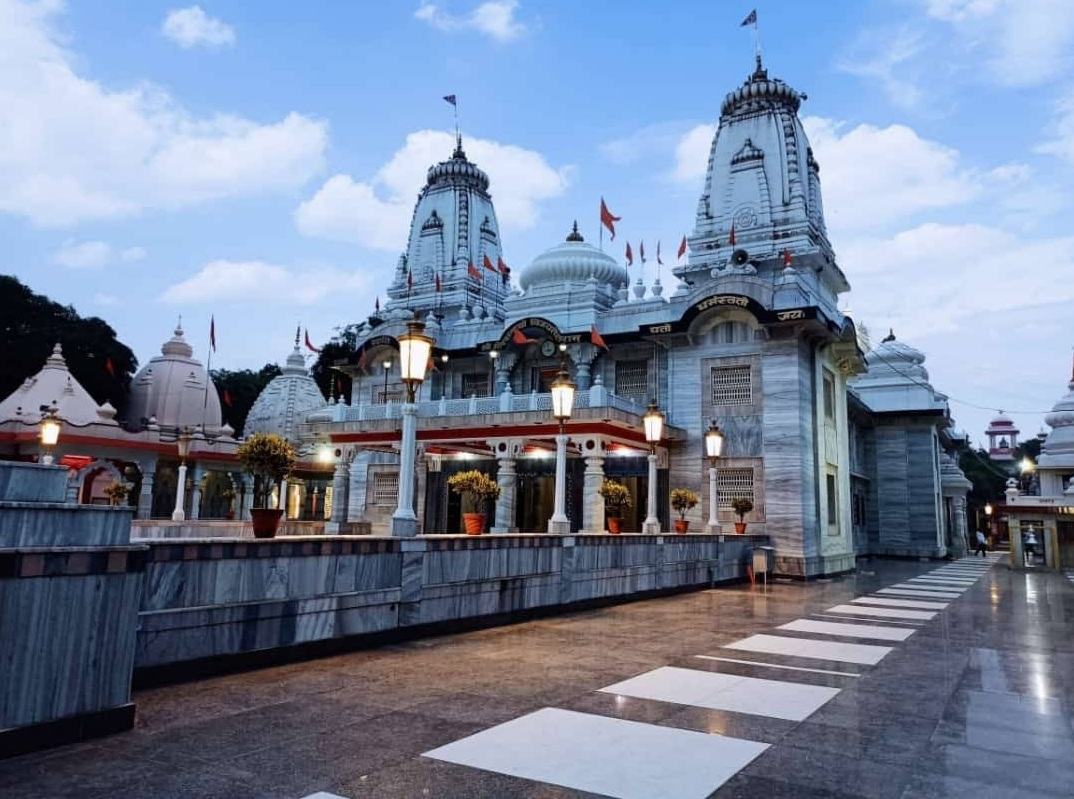
- Gorakhnath Temple

Religion
- Affiliation: Hinduism
- District: Gorakhpur
- Deity: Shiva and Guru Gorakshanath
- Festival: Makar Sankranti

Location
- State: Uttar Pradesh
- Country: India
- Interactive map of Gorakhnath Math

Architecture
- Completed: unknown

Website
- gorakhnathmandir.in

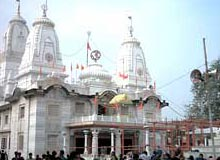
Gorakhnath Temple

Gorakhnath Math or Gorakhnath Temple or Shri Gorakhnath Mandir is a Hindu temple of the Nath monastic order group of the Nath tradition. The name Gorakhnath derives from the medieval saint, Gorakshanath (c. 11th century CE), a yogi who travelled widely across India and authored a number of texts that form a part of the canon of Natha Sampradaya. The Nath tradition was founded by guru Matsyendranath. This math is situated in Gorakhpur, Uttar Pradesh, India within large premises. The temple performs various cultural and social activities and serves as the cultural hub of the city.

== History ==
Gorakhpur takes its name from Gorakhnath, who was a saint of the 'Nath Sampradaya'. A shrine called Gorakhnath Mandir was built in his honour at the location where he did his Sādhanā.

The Gorakhpur region comprises the districts of Maharajganj, Kushinagar, Deoria, Azamgarh, Mau, Ballia and parts of Nepal Terai. These areas, which may be called the Gorakhpur Janapad, were an important centre of the Hindu culture.

Gorakhpur was a part of the kingdom of Magadha, one of the sixteen Mahajanapadas in the 6th century BCE. The lunar dynasty of whom are believed to have ruled the area, included King Brihadratha. Gorakhpur remained an integral part of the erstwhile empires of the Maurya, Shunga, Kushan, Gupta and Harsha dynasties.

The website of Gorakhnath Mandir describes its history and the attacks which the temple had to bear from time to time.

== Religious activity ==
Today's Gorakhnath Math, centred at Gorakhpur in eastern Uttar Pradesh (also named after the saint), is a religious institution that runs two Gorakhnath temples, one in Nepal in the district of Gorkha (another word believed to be derived from Baba Gorakhnath), and the other a little south of Gorakhpur. The temple at Gorakhpur is said to contain the samadhi shrine (transl. tomb) and gaddi (transl. prayer seat) of Gorakhnath. These temples constitute the centre of most of the Hindu religious activity in this region.

Thousands of devotees come to these temples on the occasion of Makar Sankranti, when they offer khichdi to Gorakhnath Baba. The King of Nepal would also occasionally visit one of these temples during this festival.

The Gorakhnath Math has a significant following in eastern Uttar Pradesh and the Terai regions of Nepal, and also among wider circles across the Nath groups. The monastic order, according to the principles of saint Gorakhnath, sanyasis serve as priests.

The present Mahant or Chief Priest is Yogi Adityanath. He was appointed Mahant on 14 September 2014. He was preceded by his guru, Mahant Avaidyanath, who died on 12 September 2014, and was given samadhi beside that of his guru Digvijay Nath in the Gorakhnath Temple.

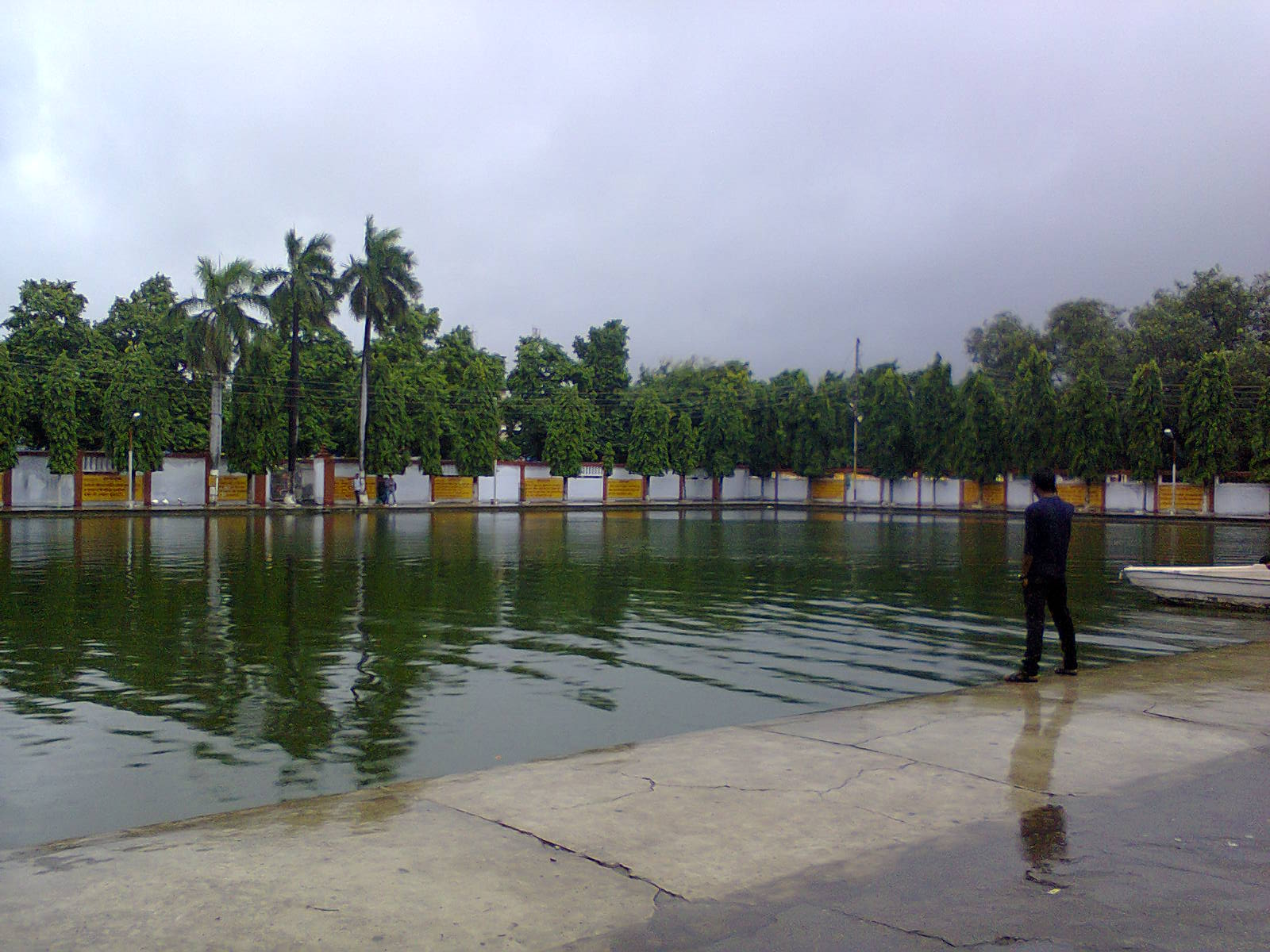
Bhim Kund at Gorakhnath Temple

== Within the Temple ==
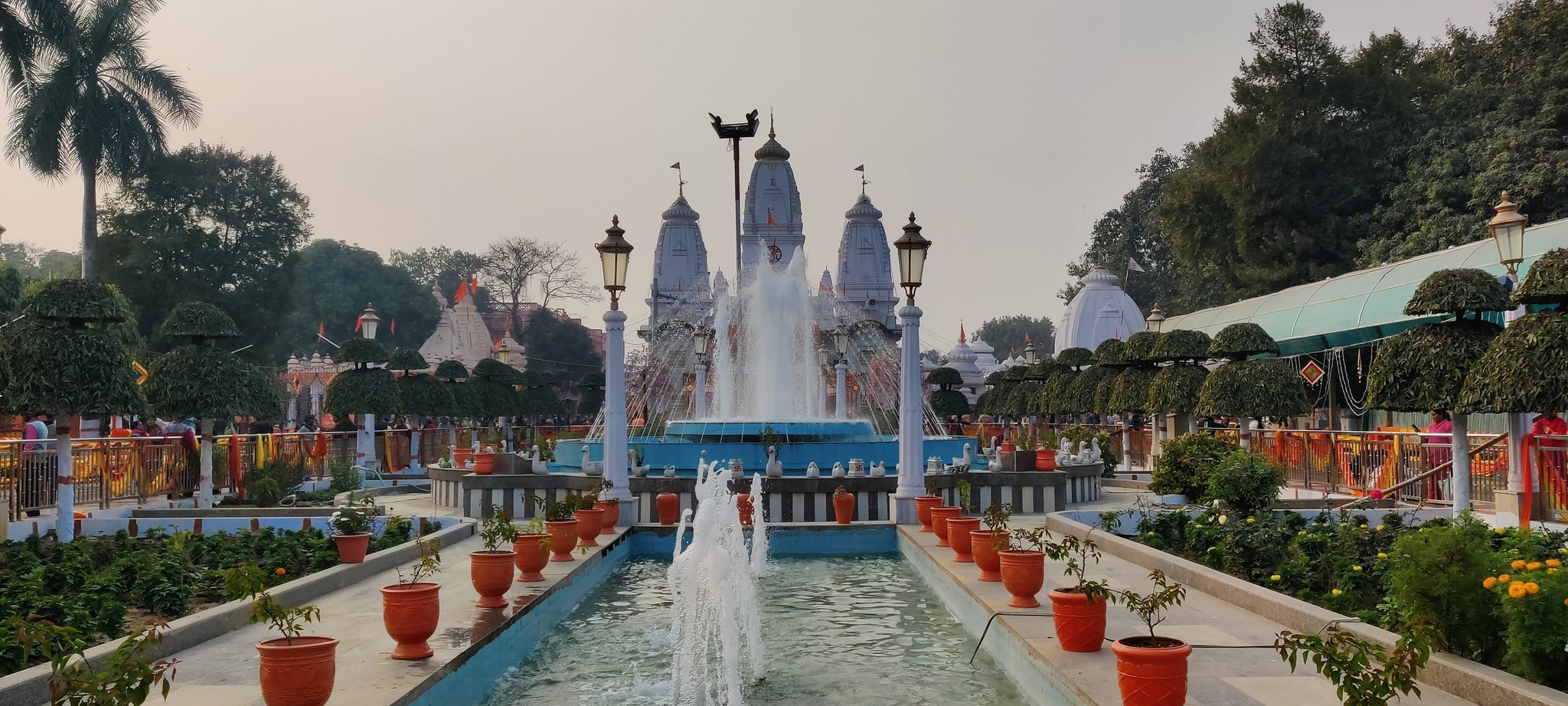
Fountain Inside Gorakhnath Temple premises

The Gorakhnath temple is seen as the main Nath establishment, among other Nath monasteries such Fatehpur Shekhawati and Asthal Bohar. The temple grounds reach across 52 acres of land in the heart of Gorakhpur. Within the temple are various hallways and rooms celebrating a variety of deities. First is Gorakhnath's personal chamber samadhi. The room once housed a statue of him but has since been replaced with footprints. It also holds his prayer seat where he held his seated pose once he returned from his travels. Leading out of the chamber is a gallery of statues including Siva, Ganesh, Kali and Bhairav. Another room contains the nine Naths found in statue form accompanied with other statues. When exiting the gallery surrounding Gorakhnath temple, there are other rooms and portraits allocated for other Hindu deities. Not only is the seat of Gorakhnath a defining feature of the temple, the eternal flame (Divya Joyti) is also held in the temple. It is said to have been burning since the time of Gorakhnath himself. Gorakhnath also known as passionate in raising and serving cows. The temple maintains a cow shed Goshala on the premises as one of the many references to the life of Gorakhnath and the goals of maintaining the sacrality of the animal. Away from the main temple, the residential spaces for current practicing ascetics can be found. Gorakhnath Math is a large pilgrimage center as well. All of these spaces within the temple grounds bring thousands of devotees as well as tourists.

== Mahants of Gorakhnath Math ==
- Yogi Naraharinath
- Gambhirnath
- Mahant Digvijay Nath (1935 - 1969)
- Mahant Avaidyanath (1969 - 2014)
- Yogi Adityanath (2014 - Current)

== Political activity ==
The Gorakhnath Math has been involved in political matters for more than a century. Mahant Digvijay Nath joined the Congress in 1921 and was arrested for taking an "active part" in the Chauri Chaura incident, thereby putting a brake on Gandhi's non-cooperation movement. However, the nath thereafter became associated with right wing organisations. Nath joined the Hindu Mahasabha in 1937 and soon became the head of the party's unit in United Provinces. He strongly opposed Gandhi's non-violent movement. Shortly after independence, he was arrested for inflaming passions against Gandhi that led to his assassination and imprisoned for 9 months. After release, he spearheaded the Ram Janmabhoomi movement of 1949, organising a 9-day long recitation of Ramcharit Manas, at the end of which the idols of Rama and Sita were appeared inside the Babri Masjid. The Babri Masjid was locked down as a result, but it led to Digvijay Nath's rise in the Hindu Mahasabha. He was appointed the General Secretary at the national level and won the election for the MP of Gorakhpur in 1967.

His successor, Mahant Avaidyanath got elected as an MLA for Maniram as an independent in 1962, 1967, 1969, 1974 and 1977 and also as an MP from Gorakhpur in 1970 and 1989. Soon after the Sangh Parivar started its own Ram Janmabhoomi movement, he joined the Bharatiya Janata Party (BJP) and got elected as MP of Gorakhpur on a BJP ticket in 1991 and 1996.

Yogi Adityanath, the mahant (Head Priest) of the temple, is also the current chief minister of Uttar Pradesh. Bharatiya Janata Party (BJP). In 2002, he founded the Hindu Yuva Vahini, a Hindutva youth militia.

== Incidents ==
On 3 April 2022, a man named Ahmad Murtaza Abbasi was alleged to have tried to enter the temple premises forcibly and attacking police constables on duty. and booked under the Unlawful Activities (Prevention) Act (UAPA).

On 30 January 2023, ten months after the attack, Ahmad Murtaza was sentenced to death by a special NIA-ATS court in Lucknow. He was found guilty of waging war against the country and carrying out a murderous attack.

The offender used PayPal to send ₹669,841 ($7,685) to foreign nations in favor of Islamic State (ISIL), according to July 2025 FATF report. A foreign source also sent him ₹10,323.35 ($188). A forensic investigation of the phone conducted by the Anti-Terrorism Squad upon the accused's detention showed that the accused was concealing his IP address through virtual private networks. The inquiry also revealed that the defendants had funded terrorist activities by sending money to several people that were recognized as ISIL supporters in other countries. PayPal blocked additional illegal money transfers by suspending the accused's account because of the suspicious nature of these transactions and the possibility that they were used to finance terrorism.

== See also ==
- Yogi Adityanath
- Mahant Avaidyanath
