= Bhitha, Uttar Pradesh =

Village in Uttar Pradesh, India

The village Bhitha falls in Gorakhpur district situated in Uttar Pradesh state, with a population 263. The male and female populations are 125 and 138 respectively. The size of the area is about 0.23 square kilometres.
