= Fateh Bahadur Singh =

Indian politician

MLA in Legislative Assembly of Uttar Pradesh
- In office March 2012 – Present
- Preceded by: New Constituency
- Constituency: Caimpiyarganj (Assembly constituency)
- In office October 1996 – March 2012
- Preceded by: Ganpat Singh
- Succeeded by: Deo Narayan Singh
- Constituency: Paniyara (Assembly constituency)
- In office June 1991 – December 1992
- Preceded by: Ganpat Singh
- Succeeded by: Ganpat Singh
- Constituency: Paniyara (Assembly constituency)

Personal details
- Born: 5 April 1969 (age 57) Paniara, Uttar Pradesh, India
- Party: Bhartiya Janta Party (2002–2007; 2017–present)
- Other political affiliations: Indian National Congress (1991–2002); Bahujan Samaj Party (2007–2012); Nationalist Congress Party (2012–2017)
- Spouse: Sadhana Singh
- Children: Jyotiraditya Singh, Vivishawan Singh
- Parent: Vir Bahadur Singh (former Chief Minister of Uttar Pradesh)
- Education: BBA from Sam Higginbottom University of Agriculture, Technology and Sciences
- Profession: Politician

Fateh Bahadur Singh is an Indian politician and a six times member of the Uttar Pradesh Legislative Assembly from Campiyarganj and Paniyara of Gorakhpur district and former forest minister of Uttar Pradesh. He served as the pro-tem speaker in 17th Vidhan Sabha of Uttar Pradesh.

== Personal life ==
He is the son of former Chief minister of Uttar Pradesh Vir Bahadur Singh. He is educated from Colonel Brown Cambridge School, Dehradun. He obtained his BBA from Sam Higginbottom University of Agriculture, Technology and Sciences, Allahabad.
