= Mahendra Pal Singh (politician) =

Indian politician

MLA in 17th Legislative Assembly of Uttar Pradesh and re-elected to 18th legislative assembly of Uttar Pradesh too
- Incumbent
- Assumed office March 2017
- Preceded by: Raj Mati Nishad
- Constituency: Pipraich (Assembly constituency)

Personal details
- Born: 2 April 1963 (age 63) Gorakhpur, Uttar Pradesh
- Party: Bharatiya Janata Party
- Education: Gorakhpur University
- Occupation: MLA
- Profession: Politician; Industry

Mahendra Pal Singh is an Indian politician and a member of 17th Legislative Assembly of Uttar Pradesh of India. He represents the Pipraich (Assembly constituency) in Gorakhpur district of Uttar Pradesh and is a member of the Bharatiya Janata Party.

== Early life and education ==
Singh was born 2 April 1963 in Purani Basti, Gorakhpur district of Uttar Pradesh to father Ram Vriksh Singh. In 1988, he married Premlata Singh, they have one son and one daughter. He belongs to Saithwar community. In 1984, he attended Dig Vijay Nath Degree College (Gorakhpur University) and attained Graduation degree. He is also president of "Shree Satyanarayan Seva Trust".

== Political career ==
Singh started his journey in politics with 17th Legislative Assembly of Uttar Pradesh (2017) elections, he got ticket by Bharatiya Janata Party from Pipraich (Assembly constituency). He was successful in the legislature in the first attempt and elected MLA by defeating Bahujan Samaj Party candidate Afatab Alam Urf Guddu Bhaiya by a margin of 12,809 votes. In 2022 Uttar Pradesh Legislative Assembly election he defeated his nearest Samajvadi party candidate Amrendra Nishad by a margin of more than 60000.

== Posts held ==
#	From	To	Position	Comments
01	March 2017	Incumbent	Member, 17th Legislative Assembly of Uttar Pradesh	
