= Mahayogi Gorakhnath University =

Private university in Uttar Pradesh

- Type: Private University
- Established: 2021
- Founder: Yogi Adityanath
- Affiliations: UGC
- Chancellor: Yogi Adityanath
- Vice-Chancellor: Lt Gen Dr Bhupesh K Goyal, AVSM,VSM (R)
- Location: Sonbarsa, Gorakhpur district, Uttar Pradesh, India; 26.8334329°N 83.3555906°E
- Website: https://mgug.ac.in/

Mahayogi Gorakhnath University is a private university in Gorakhpur, Uttar Pradesh, India. It is established by the Uttar Pradesh Private Universities (Amendment) Ordinance, 2021 (U.P. Ordinance no. 4 of 2021) along with United University and F.S. University and recognised by University Grants Commission under section 12(f) of its act. It is the first private university in Gorakhpur and Purvanchal region of Uttar Pradesh.

== History ==
President Ram Nath Kovind inaugurated this university in Gorakhpur on 28 August 2021 in presence of Uttar Pradesh Governor Anandiben Patel, Chief Minister Yogi Adityanath and several other local politicians. It is the 3rd University in Gorakhpur after Deen Dayal Upadhyay Gorakhpur University & Madan Mohan Malaviya University of Technology and first private university in Gorakhpur and Purvanchal region of Uttar Pradesh.

== Courses ==
Mahayogi Gorakhnath University Gorakhpur, offers more than 53 undergraduate, postgraduate, doctoral and diploma programmes in several disciplines.

The programmes offered by the university include:

- Medical and Ayurveda: Bachelor of Medicine and Bachelor of Surgery (MBBS), Bachelor of Ayurvedic Medicine and Surgery (BAMS), and Ph.D. in Ayurveda.
- Nursing and paramedical sciences: Auxiliary Nurse Midwifery (ANM), General Nursing and Midwifery (GNM), B.Sc. Nursing, Post Basic B.Sc. Nursing, M.Sc. Nursing, and Nurse Practitioner in Critical Care.
- Allied & Healthcare Courses: Diploma programmes in medical laboratory technology, optometry, anaesthesia and critical care, orthopaedic and plaster technology, emergency and trauma care, and dialysis technology.
- Health and Life Sciences: B.Sc. and M.Sc. programmes in biotechnology, biochemistry, microbiology, medical biochemistry and medical microbiology, along with doctoral programmes in these disciplines.
- Pharmaceutical sciences: Diploma in Pharmacy (D.Pharm.), Bachelor of Pharmacy (B.Pharm.), lateral-entry B.Pharm., and Ph.D. in Pharmacy.
- Agriculture: B.Sc. (Hons.) Agriculture, M.Sc. programmes in agronomy, genetics and plant breeding, horticulture and plant pathology, and Ph.D. in Agriculture.
- Forensic science: B.Sc., M.Sc. and Ph.D. programmes in forensic science and related fields.
- Commerce and management: Bachelor of Business Administration (BBA) programmes in logistics and e-commerce operations, Master of Business Administration (MBA) programmes in pharmaceutical management, hospital administration and healthcare management, agribusiness management and dual specialisation, and Ph.D. in Commerce and Management.
- Computer applications: Bachelor of Computer Applications (BCA) and Master of Computer Applications (MCA).

Programme availability, eligibility requirements, approved intake and tuition fees vary by course and academic session. The university publishes programme details and fee information through its official admissions and fee-structure pages on its website https://mgug.ac.in.
