= Sinhasan Singh =

Member of Parliament
- In office 1952–1967
- Constituency: Gorakhpur

Personal details
- Born: 1899
- Party: Indian National Congress

Thakur Sinhasan Singh (born 1899) was an Indian social and political leader. A member of the Indian National Congress, he was the first Member of Parliament (MP) from Gorakhpur. He became an MP in 1952, 1957 and 1962. He refused to contest in 1967.

== Early life ==
Sinhasan Singh was born to Bhola Singh in Ropan Chappra in Deoria District of Uttar Pradesh, British India. He completed his B.A. from Hindu University and secured his law degree from Lucknow University. Sinhasan Singh finished his studies in 1927 and started his practice as a lawyer the same year at Deoria. In 1926, he shifted to Gorakhpur. He was a member of the Gorakhpur District Board from 1928 to 1935 where he also served as its Junior Vice-President.

== Political career ==
Sinhasan Singh started his political career in 1929 when he joined Hindu Sabha and became Secretary of its Deoria branch. His connections with the Hindu Sabha lasted only for a year and in 1929, he became a Congressman. He was elected Secretary of the Deoria Congress Committee in 1929, and, in 1939, he became President of the Gorakhpur city Congress Committee as well as Vice-President of the District Congress Committee, Gorakhpur posts, which he continued to occupy until 1946. He was again President of the Gorakhpur City Congress Committee from 1950 to 1951. He participated in the ‘Individual Satyagraha’ of 1940 and was arrested and sent to jail for three months. After his release, he was arrested again and not set free till October 1941. For his active role in the country-wide upheaval of 1942, he was arrested in August 1942 and was kept in detention till December 1943.

He was twice elected to the U.P. Legislative Assembly, in 1937 and 1946. In the first general elections, under the new Constitution, he offered himself as a Congress candidate for the House of the People from the Gorakhpur South Parliamentary constituency, and though opposed by the General Secretary of the Hindu Mahasabha and candidates of the K.M.P.P and Socialist Party, he won the seat.

In 1950, he was announced President of the O.T. Railwaymen's Union. He served three terms as a Member of the Legislative Assembly (MLA) in the Central Province before India's Independence. Then, he was elected three times as MP to the House of the People (Lok Sabha) in the Parliament of India.

In 1977, he was said to be unhappy with the emergency and shared the stage with Jayaprakash Narayan.

== Personal life ==
He married at the age of eleven and had 6 children. He was a reader.
