= Pradeep Shukla =

Indian politician

Member of the Uttar Pradesh Legislative Assembly
- Incumbent
- Assumed office March 2022
- Preceded by: Sheetal Pandey
- Constituency: Sahajanwa

Personal details
- Born: 1981 or 1982 (age 44–45)
- Party: Bharatiya Janata Party
- Education: Shri Guru Ji Golanalkar School Khorabar, Gorakhpur, 2005
- Profession: Businessperson

Pradeep Shukla is an Indian politician and a member of 18th Legislative Assembly of Uttar Pradesh representing Sahajanwa. He is a member of the Bharatiya Janata Party.

== Personal life ==
Shukla was born to Satyadev and hails from Gorakhpur city of Uttar Pradesh. He completed his graduation from Shri Guru Ji Golanalkar School Khorabar, Gorakhpur in 2005 and is a businessperson.

== Political career ==
As a Bharatiya Janata Party candidate from Sahajanwa in the 2022 Uttar Pradesh Legislative Assembly election, Shukla received 105,981 votes, defeating rival Yashpal Singh Rawat of Samajwadi Party and succeeding party member Sheetal Pandey in the process.
