= Harikesh Bahadur =

Indian politician

Harikesh Bahadur is a national leader of the Indian National Congress and has represented Gorakhpur (Lok Sabha Constituency) on the Congress for Democracy Party ticket in 1977 and 1980. on Lokdal Ticket.
