= Sathuragiri Hills =

Sathuragiri Mahalingam temple
- Country: India
- State: Tamil Nadu
- District: Madurai.

Government
  - Body: Panchayat
- Elevation: 995 m (3,264 ft)

Languages
  - Official: Tamil
- Time zone: UTC+5:30 (IST)
- PIN: 625703
- Lok Sabha constituency: Theni
- Vidhan Sabha constituency: usilampatti
- Civic agency: Panchayat(saptur)
- Climate: Tropical wet and dry (Köppen)
- Website: https://virudhunagar.nic.in/places-of-interest/

Sathuragiri Hills (caturakiri), also known as "Chathuragiri" or "Sundara Mahalingam", is a pilgrimage site located in Madurai district and 10 km from Watrap, near Srivilliputhur, in the state of Tamil Nadu in South India. The hills are a part of the Western Ghats. This hills located in the Border of Madurai District.

Sathuragiri Hills is now open for general public on all days, entry at the base is allowed between 6AM to 10AM . During new moon and full moon days and on two Pradhosham days visiting hours are between 6 a.m. and 4 p.m. There are 3 trecking paths available. Out of 3 paths, first two paths are located along the thaliparai side of Watrap in virudhunagar district end and the last path (i.e. 3rd path) is located in vazhai thoppu side of T. Krishnapuram in Madurai District itself. But 1 & 2 path are the most usual path for trecking. Unlike other mountain trecking places in Tamil nadu, here Men and Women both are allowed for trecking. Srivilliputhur Railway Station is the nearest railway station for 1st & 2nd trecking path where as Usilampatti Railway station is the nearest railway station for 3rd trecking path. Bus transportation facilities are frequently available till Watrap as well as to T. Krishnapuram.

== Origin of the name ==
The name Sathuragiri originates from the words "Sathuram" means "Square" in Tamil and "Giri" means "Hill." The name is attributed to the fact that the hill is square-shaped and therefore known as "Sathuragiri." Many "Siddhas" are considered to be walking around the hill in an invisible form even today, and the locals usually advise visitors to be respectful of anyone they come across in the hill - as it might even be an encounter with a powerful "Siddha", and they warn against upsetting them
