= Gorakhnath =

11th-century siddha yogi and saint

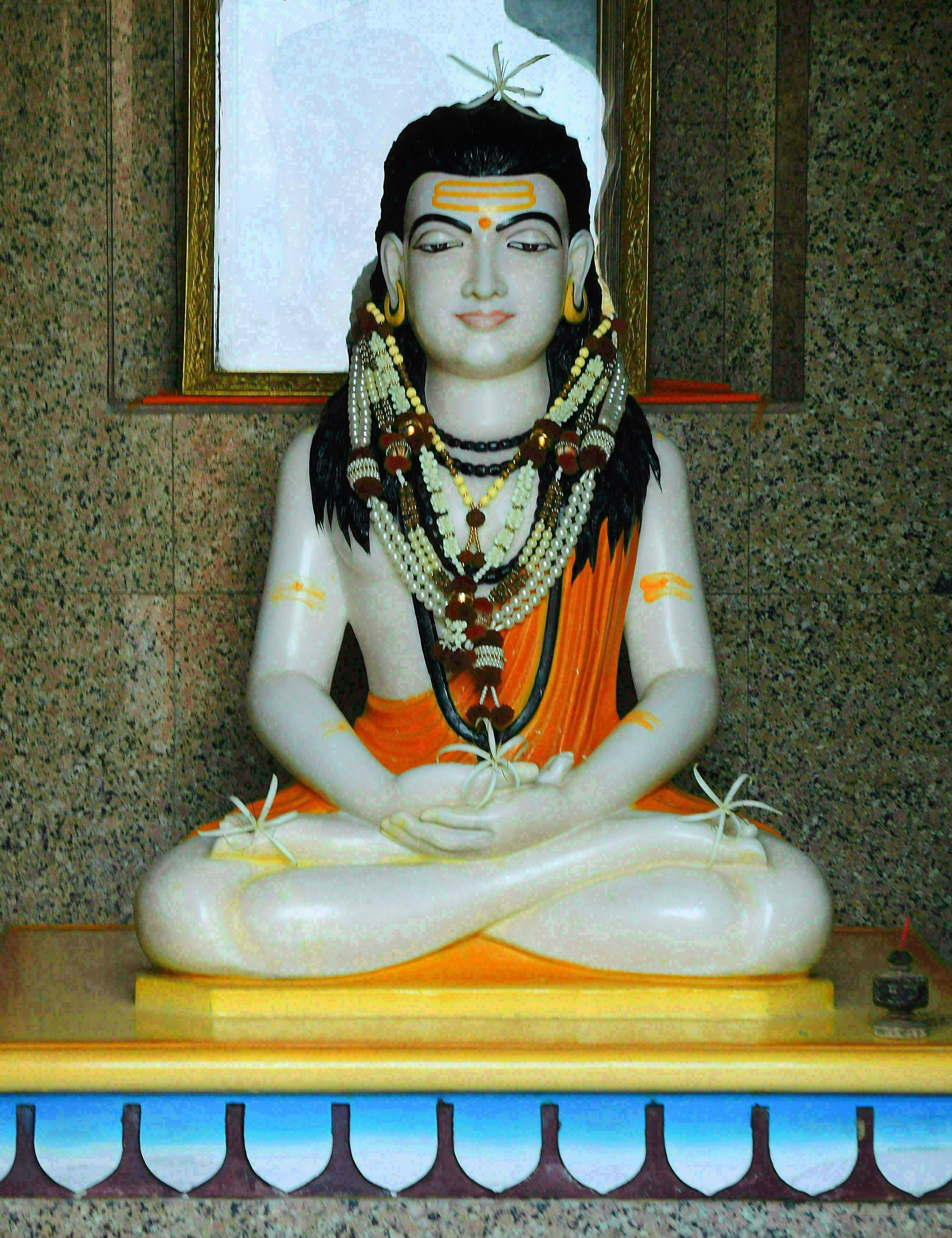
- Statue of Gorakhnath performing yogic meditation in lotus position at Laxmangarh temple, India

Personal life
- Flourished: 11th, 12th or 14th century
- Known for: Hatha yoga, Nath Yogi organisation, Guru, Gorakhpur, Gorkha
- Honors: Mahayogi

Religious life
- Religion: Hinduism
- Founder of: Nath monasteries and temples
- Philosophy: Hatha yoga
- Sect: Nath Sampradaya (sect of Shaivism)

Religious career
- Teacher: Matsyendranath

Gorakhnath (also known as Gorakshanath (Sanskrit: Gorakṣanātha) (Devanagari : गोरक्षनाथ / गोरखनाथ), c. early 11th century) was a Hindu yogi, mahasiddha and saint who was the founder of the Nath Hindu monastic movement in India. He is considered one of the two disciples of Matsyendranath. His followers are known as Jogi, Gorakhnathi, Darshani or Kanphata.

Gorakhnath is considered a Maha-yogi (or "great yogi") in Hindu tradition. He was one of nine saints, or Navnath, in the spiritual lineage of nine masters with Shiva as their first direct teacher. Hagiographies describe him to be a person outside the laws of time who appeared on earth during different ages. He did not emphasize a specific metaphysical theory or a particular Truth, but emphasized that the unbiased search for truth is a valuable and normal goal of man. Gorakhnath championed Yoga, spiritual discipline and guidance of an enlightened master (Guru) as the means to reaching samadhi or spiritual liberation.

Gorakhnath, his ideas, and his yogis have been popular in rural India, with monasteries and temples dedicated to him found in many states of India, particularly in the eponymous city of Gorakhpur. In Nepal, Gorakhnath is worshipped as the patron saint of the country, and until the abolition of monarchy in 2008, was also the official patron deity of the ruling kings in the kingdom. The Siddhar tradition of Tamil Nadu in South India reveres Gorakhnath as one of the 18 esteemed Siddhars of yore.

== Biography ==
=== Historian accounts ===
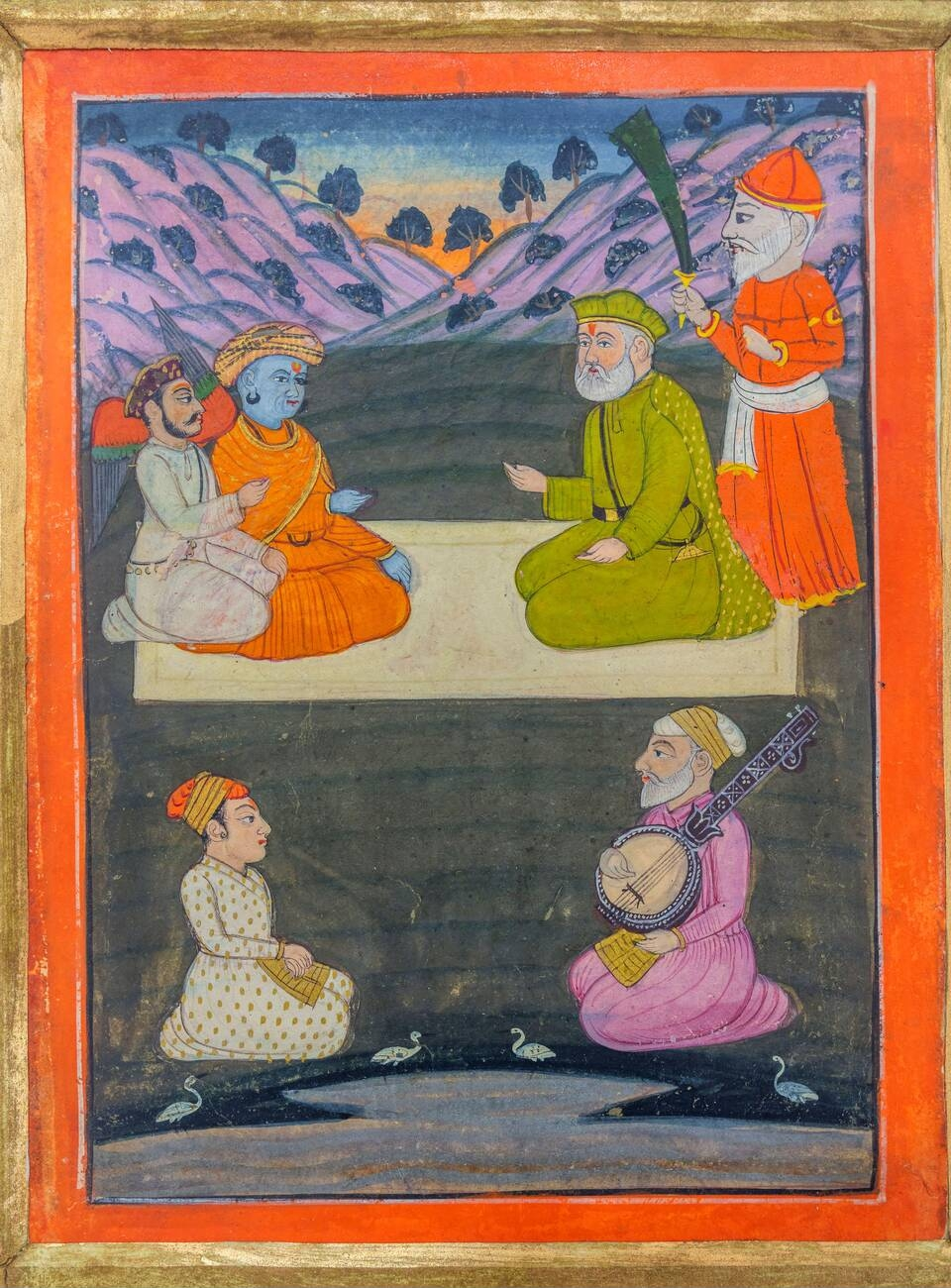
Painting from an 1830's Janamsakhi series depicting a meeting and discussion between Gorakhnath (wearing orange) and Guru Nanak (wearing green).

Historians agree that Gorakhnath lived sometime during the first half of the 2nd millennium CE, but there is some disagreement as to the century in which he lived. Estimates based on archaeological and textual evidence range from Briggs' estimate of the 11th to 12th century to Grierson's estimate of the 14th century. Abbott argues that Baba Farid documents and Jnanesvari manuscripts place Gorakhnath in the 13th century. Grierson, relying on evidence discovered in Gujarat, suggests the 14th century. Gorakhnath is referenced in the poetry of Kabir and of Guru Nanak of Sikhism, which describe him as a very powerful leader with a large following.

Historical texts imply that Gorakhnath was a Buddhist in a region influenced by Shaivism, but then converted to Hinduism, championing Shiva and Yoga. Gorakhnath led a life as an exponent of ideas of Kumarila and Adi Shankara that championed the Yogic and Advaita Vedanta interpretation of the Upanishads. Gorakhnath considered the controversy between dualism and nondualism in medieval India as useless from a practical point of view. According to Banerjea, He emphasised that the choice is that of the yogi, and that spiritual discipline and practice by either path leads to "perfectly illumined samadhi state of the individual phenomenal consciousness."

=== Hagiographic accounts ===
The hagiography on Gorakhnath describe his appearance on earth several times. The legends do not provide a birth time or place, and consider him to be superhuman. North Indian hagiographies suggest he originated from northwest India (Punjab, with some mentioning Peshawar). Other hagiographies in Bengal and Bihar suggest he originated from eastern region of India (Assam).

Available hagiographies offer varying records of the spiritual descent of Gorakhnath. All name Adinath and Matsyendranath as two teachers preceding him, though one account lists five gurus preceding Adinath, and another lists six teachers between Matsyendranath and Gorakhnath. Current tradition has Adinath placed with Shiva as the direct teacher of Matsyendranath, who was himself the direct teacher of Gorakhnath.

== Nath Sampradaya ==
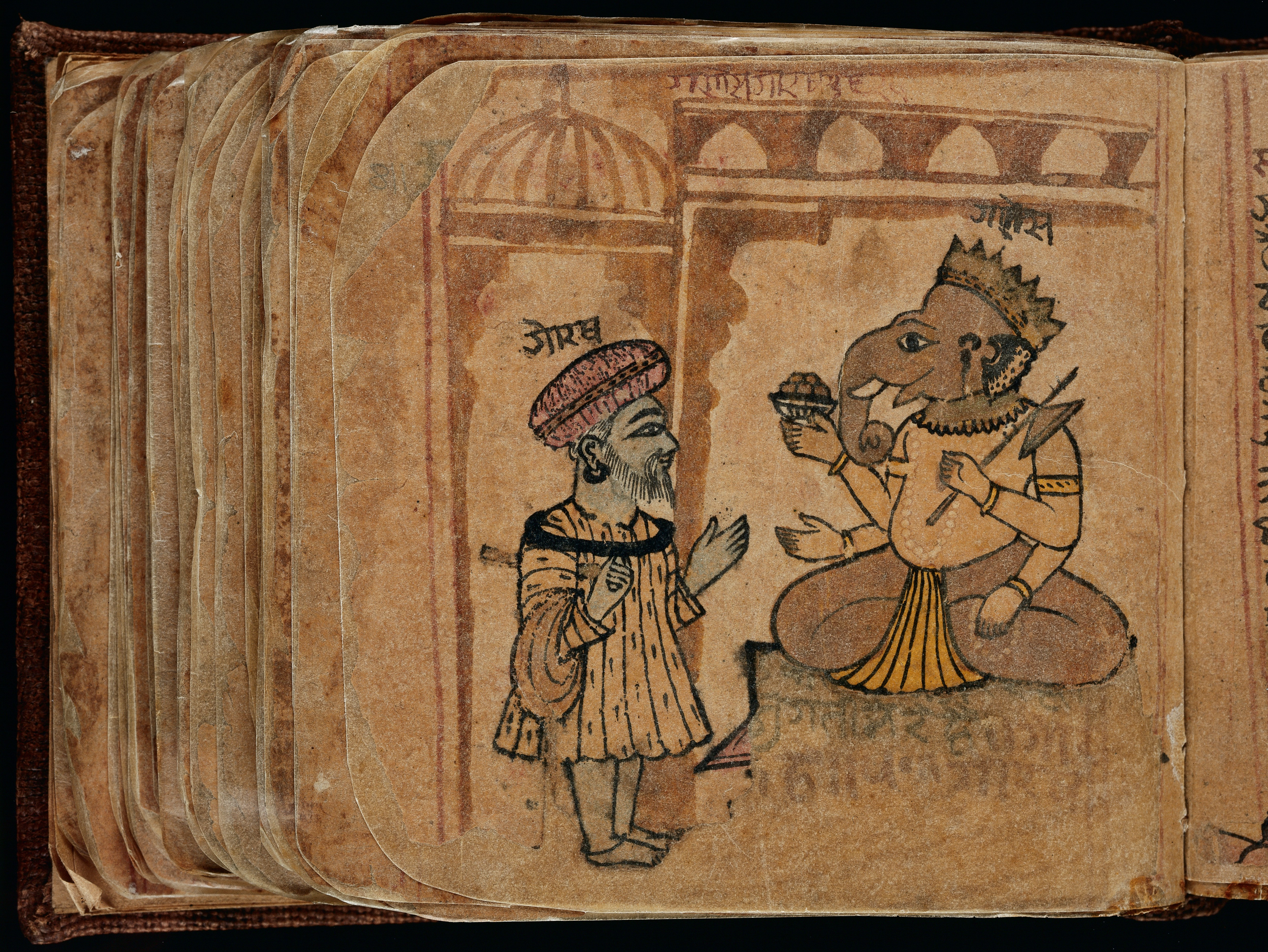
Illustrated manuscript depiction of Gorakhnath with Ganesha

The Nath existed before Gorakhnath, however the writings and works attributed to Gorakhnath are an important part of the Nath Jogi/Yogi heritage. It has been purported that Gorakhnath wrote the first books on Laya yoga. In India there are many caves, many with temples built over them, where it is said that Gorakhnath spent time in meditation. According to Bhagawan Nityananda, the samadhi shrine (tomb) of Gorakhnath is at Nath Mandir near the Vajreshwari temple about one kilometre from Ganeshpuri, Maharashtra, India. Legends state that Gorakhnath and Matsyendranath did penance in Kadri Temple at Mangalore, Karnataka. They were also instrumental in laying Shivlingam at Kadri and Dharmasthala.

The temple of Gorakhnath is situated on hill called Garbhagiri near Vambori, Tal Rahuri; Dist Ahmednagar. There is also a temple of Gorakhnath in the state of Odisha.

=== Gorakhnath Math ===
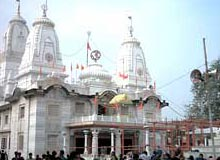
Gorakhnath mandir in Gorakhpur, India

The Gorakhnath Math is a monastery of the Nath monastic group named after the medieval saint, Gorakhnath (c. 11th century), of the Nath sampradaya. The math and town of Gorakhpur in Uttar Pradesh is named after him. The monastery and the temple perform various cultural and social activities and serve as the cultural hub of the city. The monastery also publishes texts on the philosophy of Gorakhnath.

Guru Gorakshnath at Gorakshtilla Dham In Gogamedi Rajasthan

A shrine existed at the site from older times which was converted into a mosque by Ala-ud-din Khilji. A smaller shrine was built by Nath Sampraday's followers at a later time. Later additions were made in 18th, 19th and 20th century by devotees and yogis of the order. The math is situated in a Muslim majority area and is a centre of syncretism among devotees and visitors from diverse communal background.

== Influence ==
=== Hatha yoga ===
Some scholars associate the origins of Hatha yoga with the Nath yogis, in particular Gorakhnath and his guru Matsyendranath. According to British indologist James Mallinson, this association is false. In his view, the origins of hatha yoga should be associated with the Dashanami Sampradaya of Advaita Vedanta (Hinduism), the mystical figure of Dattatreya, and the Rāmānandīs.

While the origins of Hatha yoga are disputed, according to Guy Beck, a professor of Religious Studies known for his studies on Yoga and music, "the connections between Goraknath, the Kanphatas and Hatha yoga are beyond question".

=== Langars (community kitchens) ===
Biggest Temple Of Guru Gorakhnath in World In Gorakshtilla , Gogamedi Rajasthan

Guru Gorakhnath Temple Gorakshtilla Gogamedi Rajasthan

According to Arvind-Pal Singh Mandair, a professor in Asian languages and cultures, the Gorakhnath orders were operating free community kitchens in Punjab before Guru Nanak founded Sikhism. Gorakhnath shrines have continued to operate a langar and provide a free meal to pilgrims who visit.

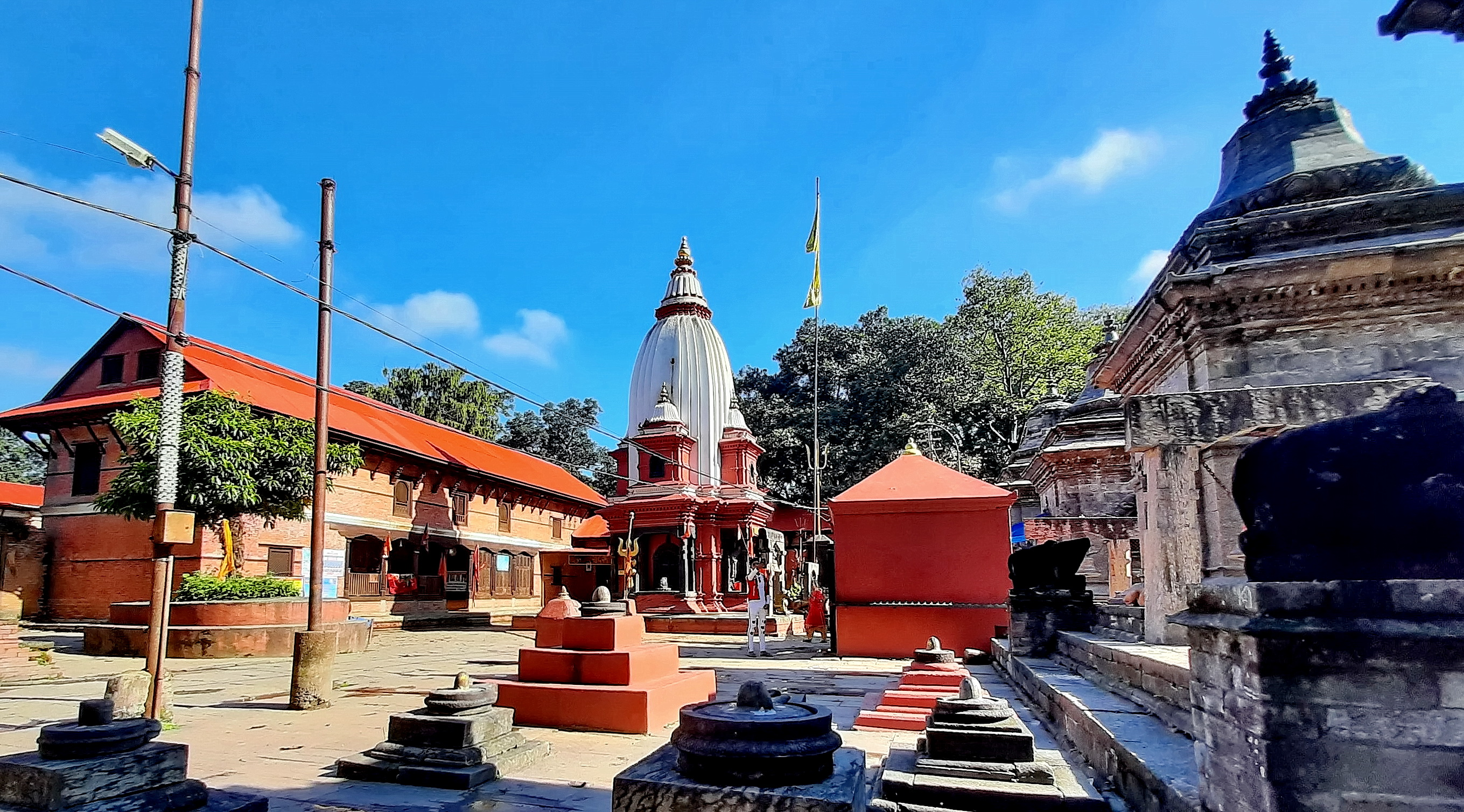
Gorakhnath temple within the zone of Pashupatinath Temple, Nepal

=== Nepal ===
The Gurkhas of Nepal take their name from Gorakhnath. Gorkha, a historical district of Nepal, is also named after him. A cave exists in Gorkha with his paduka (footprints) and an idol. Every year, on the day of Baisakh Purnima, a celebration known as Rot Mahotsav takes place in the cave; it has purportedly been celebrated for the last seven hundred years.

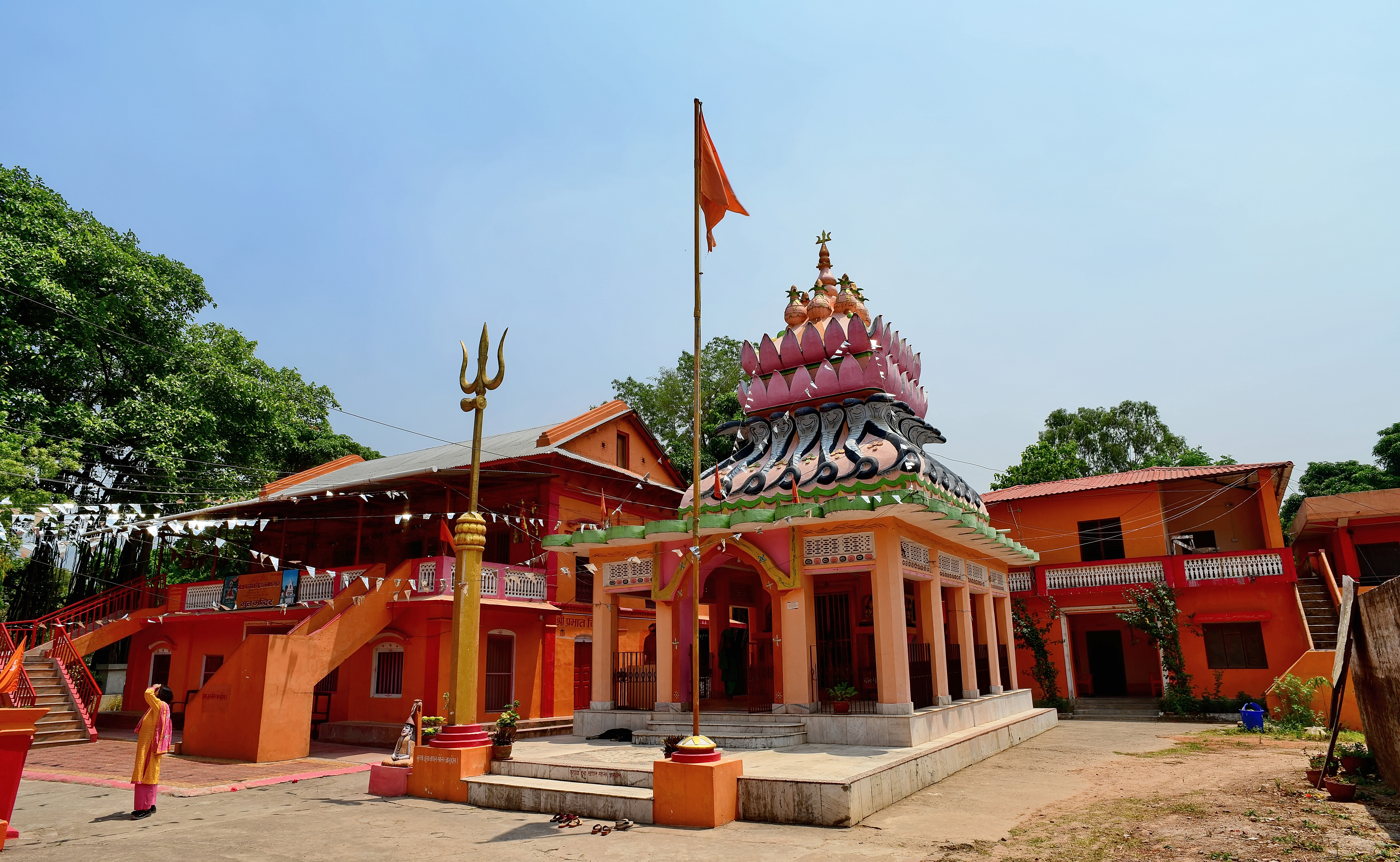
Gorakhnath temple of Dang valley, Nepal, also popularly called as Ratnanath temple

According to William Northey and John Morris, legend states that a disciple of Machendra by name Gorakhnath once visited Nepal and retired to a small hill near Deo Patan. There, he meditated in an unmovable state for twelve years. The locals built a temple in his honour there.

Dang valley of Nepal, located in the south-west of the country close to India, is regarded as one of the historically significant place for the disciples of Gorakhnath for over 1300 years. As per the legend, the king of Dang named Ratnaparikshak was initiated by Gorakhnath in the valley's forest and later became a famed siddha called Ratnanath, and built a temple. Ratnanath travelled across the sub-continent to spread the teachings of Hatha yoga.

=== Siddhar tradition ===
In the Siddhar tradition of Tamil Nadu, Gorakhnath is one of the 18 esteemed Siddhars of yore, and is also known as Korakkar. Siddhar Agastya and Siddhar Bhogar were his gurus. There is a temple in Vadukku Poigainallur, Nagapattinam, Tamil Nadu which specifically houses his Jeeva Samadhi. According to one account, he spent much of his youth in the Velliangiri Mountains, Coimbatore.

There are various other shrines honouring Korakkar, including ones located in Perur, Thiruchendur and Trincomalee. Korakkar Caves are found in both Sathuragiri and the Kolli Hills, where he is noted to have practised his sadhana. Like his colleagues, the 18 Siddhars, Korakkar wrote cryptic Tamil poetry pertaining to medicine, philosophy and alchemy. He was one of the first to use cannabis in his medicinal preparations for certain ailments; as a result, it gained the name Korakkar Mooligai (Korakkar's Herb).

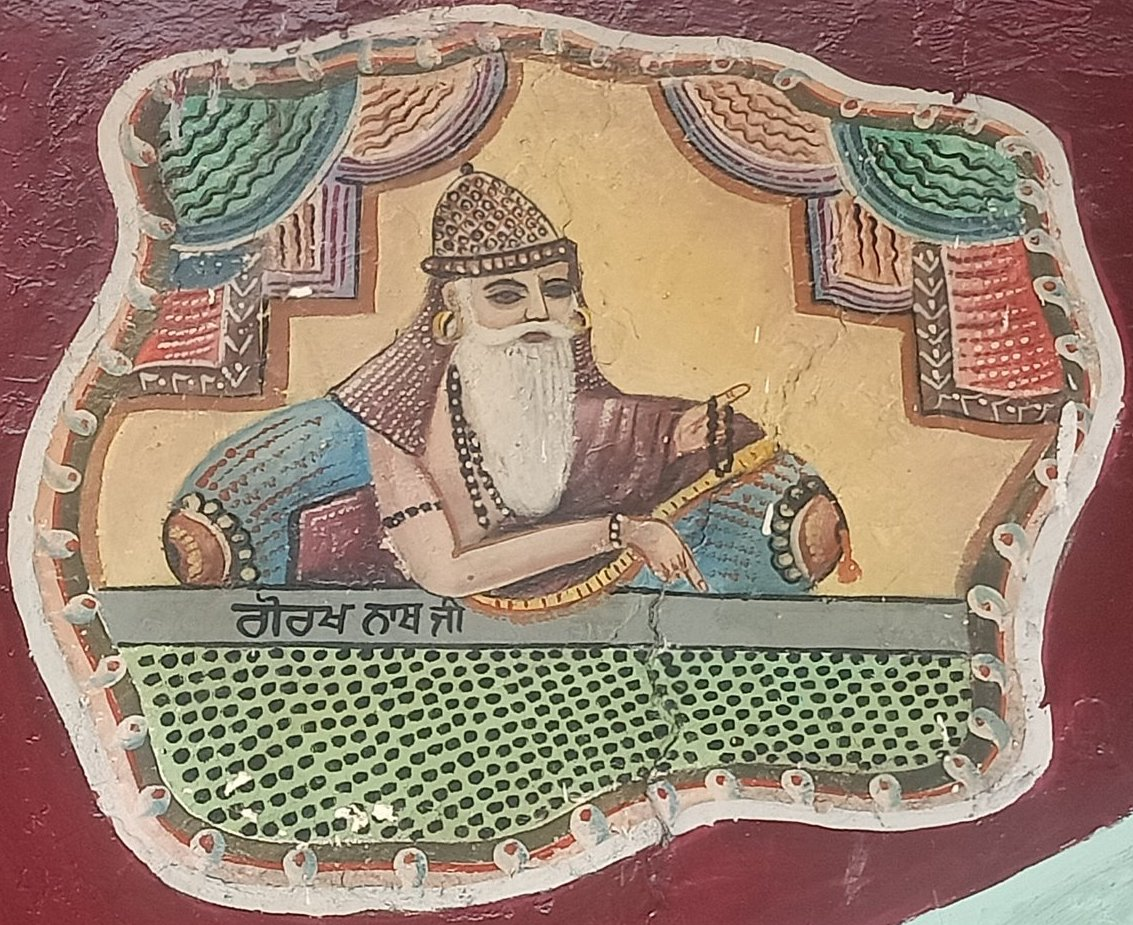
Fresco depicting Gorakhnath from Udasi Chitta Akhara in Amritsar

=== West Bengal – Assam – Tripura - Bangladesh ===
The Bengali Hindu community in the states of West Bengal, Tripura, and Assam, and the country Bangladesh have a sizeable number of people belonging to the Nath Sampradaya, named as Nath or Yogi Nath, who have taken the name from Gorakhnath. They were marginalised in Medieval Bengal.

== Works ==
Gorakhnath was perhaps one of the earliest poets of Punjabi. Romola Butalia, an Indian writer of Yoga history, lists the works attributed to Gorakhnath as including the Gorakṣaśataka, Goraksha Samhita, Goraksha Gita, Siddha Siddhanta Paddhati, Yoga Martanda, Yoga Siddhanta Paddhati, Yogabīja, Yogacintamani.

=== Siddha Siddhanta Paddhati ===
The Siddha Siddhanta Paddhati is a Hatha Yoga Sanskrit text attributed to Gorakhnath by the Nath tradition. According to Feuerstein (1991: p. 105), it is "one of the earliest hatha yoga scriptures, the Siddha Siddhanta Paddhati, contains many verses that describe the avadhuta" (liberated) yogi.

The Siddha Siddhanta Paddhati text is based on an advaita (nonduality) framework, where the yogi sees "himself in all beings, and all in himself" including the identity of the individual soul (Atman) with the universal (Brahman). This idea appears in the text in various forms, such as the following:

The four varna (castes) are perceived to be located in the nature of the individual, i.e. Brahmana in sadacara (righteous conduct), Ksatriya in saurya (valor and courage), Vaisya in vyavasaya (business), and Sudra in seva (service). A yogin experiences all men and women of all races and castes within himself. Therefore he has no hatred for anybody. He has love for every being.

— Gorakhnath, Siddha Siddhanta Paddhati III.6-8 (Translator: D Shastri)

== See also ==
- Gorakh Aya
- Maya Machhindra
- Gorakhnath Temple
- Yogi Nath
- Gorakh Hill
- Korakkar
- Ratan Nath Temple
- Tilla Jogian
- List of Hindu gurus and saints
