= Mahant Avaidyanath =

Indian politician (1919-2014)

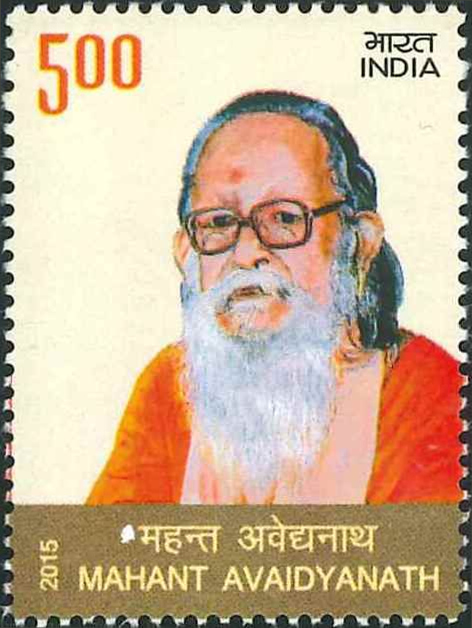

Member of Parliament, Lok Sabha
- In office December 1989 – March 1998 (3 times)
- Preceded by: Madan Pandey
- Succeeded by: Yogi Adityanath
- Constituency: Gorakhpur
- In office January 1970 – March 1971
- Preceded by: Mahant Digvijay Nath
- Succeeded by: Narsingh Narain Pandey

Member of Uttar Pradesh Legislative Assembly
- In office March 1962 – February 1980 (5 times)
- Preceded by: Keshav Pandey
- Succeeded by: Haridwar Pandey
- Constituency: Maniram

Personal details
- Born: Kripal Singh Bisht; 18 May 1919 Kandi, Garhwal District, United Provinces, British India (present-day Pauri Garhwal district, Uttrakhand)
- Died: 12 September 2014 (aged 93) Gorakhpur, Uttar Pradesh
- Party: Bharatiya Janata Party
- Other political affiliations: Hindu Mahasabha, Janata Party
- Occupation: Politician, monk

Religious life
- Religion: Hinduism
- Denomination: Shaivism
- Temple: Gorakhnath Math
- School: Yoga
- Lineage: Guru Gorakhnath
- Sect: Nath Sampradaya
- Ordination: 1969

Religious career
- Teacher: Mahant Digvijaynath
- Post: Mahant
- Period in office: 1969–2014
- Predecessor: Mahant Digvijaynath
- Successor: Yogi Adityanath
- Disciples: Yogi Adityanath

Mahant Avaidyanath (born Kripal Singh Bisht, 18 May 1919 – 12 September 2014) was an Indian politician and the head priest (Mahant) of the Gorakhnath Math, a prominent Hindu temple in Gorakhpur. He was a member of the Hindu Mahasabha and, later Bharatiya Janata Party; and got elected to the Indian parliament (Lok Sabha) from Gorakhpur four times. He played an important role in the Ram Janmabhoomi movement. He is better known as the mentor and guru of Uttar Pradesh Chief Minister Yogi Adityanath.

== Career ==
=== Religious ===
Avaidyanath succeeded Mahant Digvijay Nath as the head of Gorakhnath Math. Upon his death in 2014, he was succeeded by Yogi Adityanath (Ajay Mohan Bisht).

=== Political ===
Avaidyanath was elected MLA from Maniram Assembly segment five times – 1962, 1967, 1969 (resigned mid-term), 1974 and 1977, variously as Independent or Hindu Mahasabha's or Janata Party's candidate. He was elected Lok Sabha member from Gorakhpur as an Independent candidate in 1970 but lost 1971 General Election when Indira wave swept India. He won again in 1989 as candidate of Hindu Mahasabha. He was elected MP from the same seat in 1991 and 1996 as Bharatiya Janata Party nominee. He retired from electoral politics after that, and his protege Yogi Adityanath was elected to Lok Sabha in 1998 General Election.

=== Religio-political ===
Mahant Avaidyanath was a leader of the Ram Janmabhoomi movement, founding the Sri Ramjanmabhoomi Mukti Yagna Samiti (Committee of sacrifice to liberate Ram's birthplace) in 1984. In September of that year, the Samiti launched a "religious procession with Hindu nationalist slogans" from Sitamarhi in Bihar to Ayodhya, with the mission of 'liberating' the Ram temple. Avaidyanath gave sermons exhorting the listeners to give votes only to those parties that promised to liberate the Hindu sacred places.

== Death ==
He died on 12 September 2014 in Gorakhpur. Prime Minister of India, Narendra Modi said he was "saddened over the demise of Mahant Avaidyanath ji", and that he will be remembered for his patriotic zeal and determined efforts to serve society.

Home Minister Rajnath Singh and UP BJP president Laxmikant Bajpai also sent condolences on his death.

== Commemoration ==
A stamp is being released to mark the first death anniversary of Avaidyanath, who was also spiritual father of the current UP Chief Minister Yogi Adityanath. He died on 12 September 2014 at the age of 93.

== See also ==
- Yogi Adityanath
- Bharatiya Janata Party
- Atal Bihari Vajpayee
