= Gorakhpur district =

- District of Uttar Pradesh
- Gorakhnath Math, Gorakhpur

- Location of Gorakhpur district in Uttar Pradesh
- Country: India
- State: Uttar Pradesh
- Division: Gorakhpur
- Headquarters: Gorakhpur
- Tehsils: 7

Government
  - Lok Sabha constituencies: Gorakhpur, Bansgaon
  - Commissioner: Indra Vikram Singh IAS
  - D.M: Deepak Meena IAS
  - SSP: DR. Kaustubh IPS

Area
  - Total: 3,448 km^{2} (1,331 sq mi)

Population (2011 Census)
  - Total: 4,440,895
  - Density: 1,288/km^{2} (3,336/sq mi)
  - Urban: 836,129

Demographics
  - Literacy: 77.83%.
  - Sex ratio: 950
- Time zone: UTC+05:30 (IST)
- Vehicle registration: UP-53
- Major highways: NH 28, NH 233B, NH 29
- Languages: Hindi, Bhojpuri, Urdu
- Website: gorakhpur.nic.in

Gorakhpur district is one of the 75 districts of Uttar Pradesh state in northern India. This district is a part of the Gorakhpur division. The city of Gorakhpur, or Gorakhpur is the administrative headquarters of this district and Gorakhpur division. It borders Sant Kabir Nagar district to the west, Kushinagar and Deoria districts to the east, and Maharajganj and Azamgarh districts to the north and south.

== History ==
The district was ceded by the Nawab of Awadh to the British East India Company in 1801. It was the location of the Chauri Chaura incident in 1922. It was earlier expanded to the north to the Indo-Nepal border but the northern part was carved out to form a new Maharajganj district in 1989.

== Geography ==
Gorakhpur district lies between latitude 26°46'N and longitude 83°2'E. The district covers an area of 3,483.8 square kilometres (1,345.1 sq mi). The district lies in the Purvanchal region of Uttar Pradesh. The district is situated about 270 kilometres east of Lucknow and about 102 kilometres from Nepal Border. It is situated on the banks of the Rapti River. The district is part of Gorakhpur division.

== Demographics ==
Historical population
| Year | Pop. | ±% p.a. |
|---|---|---|
| 1901 | 954,789 | — |
| 1911 | 1,040,392 | +0.86% |
| 1921 | 1,061,375 | +0.20% |
| 1931 | 1,185,436 | +1.11% |
| 1941 | 1,311,976 | +1.02% |
| 1951 | 1,473,156 | +1.17% |
| 1961 | 1,673,134 | +1.28% |
| 1971 | 1,980,329 | +1.70% |
| 1981 | 2,460,611 | +2.20% |
| 1991 | 3,066,002 | +2.22% |
| 2001 | 3,769,456 | +2.09% |
| 2011 | 4,440,895 | +1.65% |

Religions in Gorakhpur district (2011)
| Religion | Percent |
| Hinduism | 90.28% |
| Islam | 9.09% |
| Other or not stated | 0.63% |

According to the 2011 census, Gorakhpur district has a population of 4,440,895, roughly equal to the nation of Croatia or the US state of Kentucky. This gives it a ranking of 40th in India (out of a total of 640). The district has a population density of 1,337 inhabitants per square kilometre (3,460/sq mi). Its population growth rate over the decade 2001–2011 was 17.81%. Gorakhpur has a sex ratio of 944 females for every 1000 males, and a literacy rate of 70.83%. 18.83% of the population lives in urban areas. Scheduled Castes and Scheduled Tribes made up 21.08% and 0.41% of the population respectively.

=== Languages ===
Languages in Gorakhpur district (2011)
1. Bhojpuri (51.3%)
2. Hindi (46.5%)
3. Urdu (2.02%)
4. Others (0.19%)

The official language of the district is Hindi and additional official language is Urdu.

At the time of the 2011 Census of India, 51.31% of the population in the district identified as Bhojpuri speakers, 46.48% as Hindi speakers and 2.02% Urdu speakers.

Bhojpuri is the local language of Gorakhpur. The Bhojpuri variant of Kaithi is the indigenous script of Bhojpuri language.

== Economy ==
The economy of the district in early 2000s was comparatively low to other major districts in the state, but since 2014 Gorakhpur district is developing on a good rate and its economy is also increased. The Gorakhpur Development Authority (GDA) handles all the development projects in this District.

== Attractions ==
- Geeta Press
- Gorakhnath Temple
- Gorakhpur Zoo
- Chauri Chaura Incident Memorial
- Ramgarh Tal Lake

== Transportation ==
- Gorakhpur Junction railway station

== Education ==
Gorakhpur district is home of government run universities like Deen Dayal Upadhyay Gorakhpur University, Madan Mohan Malaviya University of Technology and Maha Yogi Guru Gorakhnath Ayush University. It also has a private university named Mahayogi Gorakhnath University. It has two medical colleges named Baba Raghav Das Medical College and All India Institute of Medical Sciences, Gorakhpur.

== Notable people ==
- Yogi Adityanath, Indian Hindu monk and politician serving as the 21st and current Chief Minister of Uttar Pradesh.
- Leo Amery, British Cabinet Minister
- Mahant Avaidyanath Indian politician, and hindu guru
- Premindra Singh Bhagat, recipient of Victoria Cross
- Ram Upendra Das, economist
- Amrapali Dubey, actress
- Ravi Dubey, actor
- Mahmood Farooqui, Indian writer, artist and director
- Firaq Gorakhpuri, Indian Urdu writer
- Majnun Gorakhpuri, Pakistani short story writer, poet and literary critic
- Bilal U. Haq, geo-scientist and poet
- Narendra Hirwani, international cricket player
- Anurag Kashyap, filmmaker
- Kafeel Khan, physician
- Ravi Kishan, Member of Parliament from Gorakhpur Lok Sabha constituency
- Nurul Ain Lari, known as Ahmar Lari, Urdu scholar
- Tabassum Mansoor, Indian educationist in Libya
- Vidya Niwas Mishra, Hindi-Sanskrit littérateur, and a journalist
- Syed Modi, badminton player, winner of Arjuna Award
- Mahendra Nath Mulla, MVC, officer of the Indian Navy
- Jamuna Nishad, Indian politician
- Praveen Kumar Nishad, Indian politician
- Sanjay Nishad, politician, founder of NISHAD Party
- Kamlesh Paswan, politician and Member of Parliament, 17th Lok Sabha
- Subrata Roy, Indian businessman, founder of Sahara India Pariwar
- Asit Sen, Bollywood actor
- Sunil Shastri, former-MLA Gorakpur Urban, former minister in Government of Uttar Pradesh
- Jimmy Sheirgill, actor
- Prakash Shukla, Indian contract killer
- Saurabh Shukla, actor
- Shiv Pratap Shukla, Indian politician and social worker
- Bandhu Singh, freedom fighter
- Kedarnath Singh, poet, critic
- Lilavati Singh, educator
- Vir Bahadur Singh, former Chief Minister of Uttar Pradesh
- Prem Maya Sonir, hockey player
- Manglesh Kumar Srivastava, Mayor of Gorakhpur city
- Hari Shankar Tiwari, Indian politician
- Amarmani Tripathi, Indian politician
- Paramahansa Yogananda, yoga guru, founder of Self-Realization Fellowship/Yogoda Satsanga Society of India

== Villages ==
- Bhitha, Uttar Pradesh
- Mithabel
- Rithuakhor
