= Nahid Hasan =

Indian politician

Member of the Uttar Pradesh Legislative Assembly
- Incumbent
- Assumed office October 2014
- Preceded by: Hukum Singh
- Constituency: Kairana

Personal details
- Born: 1 October 1988 (age 38) Kairana, Uttar Pradesh, India
- Party: Samajwadi Party
- Parents: Chaudhary Munawwar Hasan (father); Begum Tabassum Hasan (mother)
- Relatives: Iqra Choudhary (sister)
- Education: Holmes Institute
- Profession: Politician

Nahid Hasan is an Indian politician and a member of the 18th Uttar Pradesh Legislative Assembly. He was also a member of the 16th and 17th Legislative Assembly of Uttar Pradesh. Hasan represents the Kairana constituency of Uttar Pradesh and is a member of the Samajwadi Party.

== Early life and education ==
Nahid Hasan was born in a Muslim family of Kairana in the district of Shamli in Uttar Pradesh.

Hasan holds Bachelor of Business Administration degree from Holmes Institute in Sydney. His father Chaudhary Munawwar Hasan was an MLA in the 11th and the 12th legislative assemblies of Uttar Pradesh as well as a Member of 11th and 14th Lok Sabha and became Rajya sabha member from 1998 till 2003. Munawwar Hasan was also elected as a Member of Legislative Council (MLC) from Muzaffarnagar-Saharanpur Local Body Authorities constituency in 2003. Nahid's mother, Begum Tabassum Hasan has also been elected to the Lok Sabha in 2009 and 2018.

== Political career ==
Nahid Hasan has been a MLA for three-terms. Hasan represents Kairana constituency and is a member of the Samajwadi Party. In Oct. 2014, he was elected to office after sitting member Hukum Singh got elected to the 16th Lok Sabha. In the by-poll election, he defeated Bhartiya Janata Party candidate Anil Kumar by a margin of 1,099 votes.

He was elected to the Seventeenth Legislative Assembly of Uttar Pradesh in 2017, he defeated Bhartiya Janata Party candidate Mriganka Singh by a margin of 21,162 votes.

In 2022 Uttar Pradesh Legislative Assembly election, Hasan again defeated Mriganka Singh by 25,887 votes.

== Legal cases ==
Nahid Hasan broke the traffic rule and misbehaved with the police. After the incident, he ran away and wasn't found at his residence in Police raid. Later, he was declared as 'absconder' and was booked under sections 153, 353 and 453 of the IPC. A total of 12 FIRs have been lodged on Hasan which include serious crimes like attempt to murder, forgery and attempt to incite communal tensions.

== Posts held ==
#	From	To	Position	Comments
01	2014	Mar-2017	Member, 16th Legislative Assembly	
02	Mar-2017	March-2022	Member, 17th Legislative Assembly	
03	Mar-2022	Incumbent	Member, 18th Uttar Pradesh Assembly	

== Elections contested ==
Year	Election Type	Constituency	Result	Vote percentage	Opposition Candidate	Opposition Party	Opposition vote percentage	Ref
2012	MLA	Gangoh	Lost	14.53%	Pradeep Choudhary	INC	28.44%	
2014	MP	Kairana	Lost	29.40%	Hukum Singh	BJP	50.56%	
2014 (by election)	MLA	Kairana	Won	44.99%	Anil Kumar	BJP	44.40%	
2017	MLA	Kairana	Won	47.49%	Mriganka Singh	BJP	37.33%	
2022	MLA	Kairana	Won	54.16%	Mriganka Singh	BJP	43.46%	

== See also ==
- Kairana
- Uttar Pradesh Legislative Assembly
- Government of India
- Politics of India
- Samajwadi Party
