= Purmafi =

Village in Northern India

Coordinates: 29°33′N 77°16′E

Purmafi is a village in Un tehsil and in Shamli district, situated around 15 km north-west to Shamli, in the state of Uttar Pradesh in northern India. It has a population of around 6,000 people.

There are 2-3 small towns at a distance of 3–5 km, such as Jhinjhana, Oon, and Garhi Pukhta.
