= Suresh Rana =

Indian politician

Suresh Kumar Rana

Minister of Sugarcane Development & Sugar Industries Government of Uttar Pradesh
- In office 19 March 2017 – 25 March 2022
- Chief Minister: Yogi Adityanath
- Succeeded by: Chaudhary Laxmi Narayan Singh

Member of Uttar Pradesh Legislative Assembly
- In office 2012–2022
- Preceded by: Abdul Warish Khan
- Succeeded by: Ashraf Ali Khan
- Constituency: Thana Bhawan

Personal details
- Born: 5 July 1970 (age 55) Thana Bhawan, Shamli district
- Party: Bharatiya Janata Party
- Spouse: Neeta Rana (m. 1996)
- Children: 3 (2 sons, and 1 daughter)
- Parent: Ranveer Singh (father)
- Profession: Agriculturist and Politician

Suresh Singh Rana is a politician based in western Uttar Pradesh. He was a member of the 16th Legislative Assembly of Uttar Pradesh and is currently a member of 17th Legislative Assembly of Uttar Pradesh in the northern state of India. He represents the Thana Bhawan constituency of Uttar Pradesh and is a member of the Bharatiya Janata Party. Rana has previously served as a Minister of State (Independent Charge) in the Uttar Pradesh Government and currently holds the position of a Cabinet Minister in the Yogi Adityanath led Government and holds the portfolios of sugarcane development and sugarcane mills.

== Early life and education ==
Suresh Singh Rana was born in Thana Bhawan, Shamli in 1970 in a Pundir Rajput family to Thakur Ranveer Singh Pundir. As per his election affidavit, Rana is 12th pass. Prior to entering politics, he was an agriculturist by profession.

== Muzaffarnagar Riots ==
In November 2015 a bailable warrant was issued against Rana for violating prohibitory orders and instigating communal tension during the 2013 Muzaffarnagar riots. According to NDTV, Rana was charged with

offences under the Indian Penal Code sections 188 (violating prohibitory orders), 353 (assault or criminal force to deter public servant from discharging his duty) and 341 (wrongful restraint).It is alleged that [he] participated in a Nadala Mador panchayat meeting and violated prohibitory orders and incited violence through [his] speeches on August 30, 2013.

In December 2015, Rana surrendered before a Muzzafarnagar court after the court issued a bailable warrant against him.

On 30 January 2017, a case was filed against Rana for hate speech after claiming that he would impose a curfew on Kairana, Deoband, and Moradabad if he won in the upcoming 2017 Assembly elections. The next day, another case was filed against him for violating electoral conduct after laying down a foundation stone with his name on it on a newly built road in Goherpur village in Shamli district.

== Political career ==
Suresh Rana has been a MLA for two terms. Rana represents Thana Bhawan constituency and is a member of the Bharatiya Janata Party.

He got the ministries of Cane Development and Sugar Mills, Industrial development.

== Posts Held ==
#	From	To	Position	Comments
01	2012	2017	Member, 16th Legislative Assembly	
02	2017	Incumbent	Member, 17th Legislative Assembly: Minister of State Independent Charge	

== See also ==
- Thana Bhawan
- Uttar Pradesh Legislative Assembly
- Government of India
- Politics of India
- Bharatiya Janata Party
