= Baghra Assembly constituency =

Former constituency of the Uttar Pradesh legislative assembly in India

Coordinates: 29.47°N 77.57°E

Baghra
- Former constituency for the Uttar Pradesh Legislative Assembly

Constituency details
- Country: India
- Region: North India
- State: Uttar Pradesh
- District: Muzaffarnagar
- Established: 1974
- Abolished: 2012

Baghra Assembly constituency was one of the 403 constituencies of the Uttar Pradesh Legislative Assembly, India. It was a part of the Muzaffarnagar district and one of five assembly constituencies in the Kairana (Lok Sabha constituency).

Baghra Assembly constituency was demolished in 2008 as a result of the "Delimitation of Parliamentary and Assembly Constituencies Order, 2008".

== Members of the Legislative Assembly ==
#	Term	Name	Party	From	To	Days	Comments	Ref
01	06th Vidhan Sabha	Virendra Verma	Indian National Congress	Mar-1974	Apr-1977	1,153	-	
02	07th Vidhan Sabha	Babu Singh	Independent	Jun-1977	Feb-1980	969	-	
03	08th Vidhan Sabha	Nakli Singh	Indian National Congress	Jun-1980	Mar-1985	1,735	-	
04	09th Vidhan Sabha	Babu Singh	Indian National Congress	Mar-1985	Nov-1989	1,725	-	
05	10th Vidhan Sabha	Harendra Singh Malik	Janata Dal	Dec-1989	Apr-1991	488	-	
06	11th Vidhan Sabha	Harendra Singh Malik	Janata Dal	Jun-1991	Dec-1992	533	-	
07	12th Vidhan Sabha	Harendra Singh Malik	Janata Dal	Dec-1993	Oct-1995	693	-	
08	13th Vidhan Sabha	Pradeep Balyan	Bharatiya Janata Party	Oct-1996	May-2002	1,967	-	
09	14th Vidhan Sabha	Anuradha Choudhary	Rashtriya Lok Dal	Feb-2002	May-2004	828	Elected to 14th Lok Sabha in May 2004	
09	14th Vidhan Sabha	Paramjeet Malik	Rashtriya Lok Dal	Oct-2004	May-2007	1,074	Elected during by-election	
10	15th Vidhan Sabha	Pankaj Kumar Malik	Indian National Congress	May-2007	Mar-2012	1,762	-	

== Election results ==
=== 2004 ===
2004 Assembly Election: Baghra
Party	Candidate	Votes	%	±%
RLD	Paramjeet Malik	42,705	32.18	
INC	Pankaj Kumar Malik	39,004	29.39	
BSP	Chatar Singh	35,278	26.58	
BJP	Pradeep	7097	5.35	
Majority		3701	2.62	
Turnout		1,32,717	58.74	
RLD gain from INC		Swing		

=== 2002 ===
2002 General Elections:Baghra
Party	Candidate	Votes	%	±%
RLD	Anuradha Choudhary	48,509	40.91	–
SP	Udaipal	30,680	25.87	–
INLD	Yogesh	17,065	14.39	–
BSP	Vedpal Singh	12,234	10.32	–
Majority		17,829	15.04	–
Turnout		118,574	59.58	–
BSP hold		Swing	–	

== See also ==
- Baghra
- Government of Uttar Pradesh
- List of Vidhan Sabha constituencies of Uttar Pradesh
- Uttar Pradesh
- Uttar Pradesh Legislative Assembly
