= Bhikki Deh =

Village in Uttar Pradesh, India

- Village
- Location in Uttar Pradesh, India
- Coordinates: 29.451286°N 77.368005°E
- Country: India
- State: Uttar Pradesh
- District: Shamli
- Tehsil: Shamli

Area
  - Total: 1.38 km^{2} (0.53 sq mi)
- Elevation: 264 m (866 ft)

Population (2011)
  - Total: 472
- Time zone: UTC+5:30 (IST)
- PIN: 247776
- Vehicle registration: UP-19

Bhikki Deh is a village located in Shamli tehsil of Shamli district in the Indian state of Uttar Pradesh.

== Geography ==
Bhikki Deh is situated in the Shamli tehsil of Shamli district in western Uttar Pradesh. According to the District Census Handbook of Shamli, the village covers a geographical area of approximately 138.39 hectares (about 1.38 square kilometres).

The village lies approximately 6 kilometres from Shamli town, which serves as the tehsil and district headquarters, and about 36 kilometres from Muzaffarnagar, the former district headquarters. The region forms part of the upper Indo-Gangetic Plain and is predominantly agricultural. The climate is typical of western Uttar Pradesh, with hot summers, a monsoon season, and cool winters.

== Demographics ==
As per the 2011 Census of India, Bhikki Deh had a population of 472, comprising 248 males and 224 females, living in around 72 households.

Children aged 0–6 years accounted for 82 individuals, or about 17 percent of the population. The overall sex ratio of the village was 903 females per 1,000 males, while the child sex ratio was 822. Scheduled Castes constituted approximately 8.5 percent of the population, and no Scheduled Tribe population was reported.

The literacy rate of Bhikki Deh was recorded at approximately 60.38 percent. Male literacy stood at about 66.94 percent, while female literacy was around 53.13 percent.

== Administration ==
Administratively, Bhikki Deh falls under Shamli tehsil of Shamli district. At the time of the 2011 Census, Bhikki Deh was part of Muzaffarnagar district. For local self-governance, the village is administratively grouped under the Goharpur gram panchayat.

The village uses the postal PIN code 247776, and administrative services are provided through Shamli town.

== Economy ==
Agriculture is the primary economic activity in Bhikki Deh. Census data indicate that around 257 residents were engaged in work activities, with the majority classified as main workers. Most workers were cultivators, either as landowners or co-owners, while a small proportion were agricultural labourers.

== Education ==
Educational facilities in the village include government-run primary and middle schools. For higher secondary and collegiate education, residents largely depend on nearby towns, particularly Shamli.

== Transport ==
Bhikki Deh is connected to surrounding areas through district and state roads. Bus services are available within a short distance from the village, and the nearest railway station is located in Shamli town, providing regional rail connectivity.
