= Shafquat Jung =

Indian politician

Ex-MP Shafquat Jung

Member of Parliament, Lok Sabha for Kairana
- In office 1971–1977
- Preceded by: Ghayoor Ali Khan
- Succeeded by: Chandan Singh

Member of Legislative Assembly for Kairana
- In office Mar 1967 – Apr 1968
- Preceded by: Chandan Singh
- Succeeded by: Chandra Bhan

Personal details
- Born: Kandhla, Muzaffarnagar, Uttar Pradesh
- Party: Indian National Congress
- Children: 1 son and 2 daughters

Shafquat Jung was an Indian politician and a member of the 4th Legislative Assembly of Uttar Pradesh of India. He represents the Kairana constituency of Uttar Pradesh and was a member of the Congress political party.

== Positions held ==
- Chairman Municipal Board, Kandhla,
- Member District Board, Muzaffar Nagar, and
- MLA U.P. Vidhan Sabha, 1967

== Elections Contested ==
Year	Election Type	Constituency	Result	Vote percentage	Opposition Candidate	Opposition Party	Opposition vote percentage	Ref
1962	MLA	Kairana	Lost	5.18%	Chandan Singh	IND	45.5%	
1967	MLA	Kairana	Won	30.81%	Chandra Bhan	IND	24.95%	
1969	MLA	Kandhla	Lost	21.86%	Ajab Singh	BKD	49.52%	
1971	MP	Kairana	Won	52.36%	Ghayoor Ali Khan	BKD	28.88%	
1977	MP	Kairana	Lost	64.6%	Chandan Singh	BLD	25.48%	
1980	MLA	Kairana	Lost	26.43%	Hukum Singh	JNP (SC)	40.05%	
1989	MLA	Kairana	Lost	1.89%	Rajeshwar Bansal	IND	50.08%	
