= Shiv nagar, Shamli =

Shivnagar
- Hamlet
- Country: India
- State: Uttar Pradesh
- District: Shamli district

Government
  - Body: Bibipur Jalalabad Gram panchayat

Languages
  - Official: Hindi
- Time zone: UTC+5:30 (IST)
- Nearest city: Jhinjhana

Shiv nagar, also known as Shivnagar, is a hamlet near Bibipur Jalalabad village on the outskirts of Jhinjhana town in Shamli district in Uttar Pradesh, India.

== History ==
In June 2011, Snapdeal installed 15 hand pumps so that villagers would no longer need to walk for miles to fetch drinking water. The hamlet was facing shortage of clean water. To express their gratitude, residents erected a board naming the hamlet "Snapdeal.com Nagar" in addition to Shiv nagar.
