= Kirat Singh Gurjar =

Member of the Uttar Pradesh Legislative Assembly

Member of the Uttar Pradesh Legislative Assembly
- Incumbent
- Assumed office March 2022
- Preceded by: Pradeep Choudhary
- Constituency: Gangoh

Personal details
- Born: Kirat Singh Gurjar; 1 March 1967 (age 59) Saharanpur, Uttar Pradesh, India
- Party: Bharatiya Janata Party
- Education: Manav Bharti University
- Occupation: Business
- Profession: Politician

Kirat Singh Gurjar is an Indian politician and businessman. He is a member of the 18th Legislative Assembly of Uttar Pradesh, representing the Gangoh Assembly constituency of Uttar Pradesh. Kirat is a member of the Bharatiya Janata Party, the largest political party in India.

== Early life ==
Kirat Singh Gurjar was born to a Hindu Gujjar family on 1 March 1967 into the family of Shri Mamchand in Saharanpur, Uttar Pradesh, India. He grew up in Uttar Pradesh and graduated with a Bachelor of Arts from Manav Bharti University, Solan, Himachal Pradesh.

== Political career ==
In the 2022 Uttar Pradesh Legislative Assembly election, Gurjar represented Bharatiya Janata Party as a candidate from the Gangoh Assembly constituency and defeated Inder Sain of the Samajwadi Party by a margin of 23449 votes.

== Posts held ==
#	From	To	Position	Comments
01	2022	Incumbent	Member, 18th Legislative Assembly	

== See also ==
- 18th Uttar Pradesh Assembly
- Gangoh Assembly constituency
- Uttar Pradesh Legislative Assembly
