= Delhi–Dehradun Expressway =

Indian six-lane expressway

National Highway 709B
- Delhi–Saharanpur–Dehradun Expressway

Route information
- Maintained by NHAI
- Length: 210 km (130 mi)
- Existed: January 2024–present

Major junctions
- From: Delhi
- To: Dehradun

Location
- Country: India
- States: Delhi, Uttar Pradesh and Uttarakhand
- Major cities: Delhi, Baghpat, Baraut, Shamli, Saharanpur and Dehradun

Highway system
- Roads in India; Expressways; National; State; Asian

The Delhi–Dehradun Expressway, also known as Delhi-Dehradun Economic Corridor, is a 210 kilometres (130 mi) long, 12/6 lane access-controlled expressway, connecting Delhi, the national capital of India, with Dehradun, the Winter capital of the Indian state of Uttarakhand. The highway includes multiple independent stretches of different highways including National Highway 709B (NH-709B), National Highway 307 (NH-307) and a green field alignment between Eastern Peripheral Expressway and Saharanpur bypass denoted as National Highway 344G (NH-344G) The highway passes through the states of Delhi, Uttar Pradesh and Uttarakhand, and through the cities of Baghpat, Baraut, Shamli and Saharanpur.

It has two spurs, or link roads, to ensure connectivity with cities lying nearby to its route: one 50.7-kilometre-long (31.5 mi), six-lane Saharanpur–Roorkee–Haridwar Expressway, and another 121-kilometre-long (75 mi), six-lane Ambala-Shamli Expressway. It reduces both travel time and distance, from around 5–6 hours to only 2.5 hours, and from around 280 kilometres (170 mi) to 210 kilometres (130 mi). It also connects to Char Dham Highway at Haridwar in Uttarakhand.

== History ==
In February 2020, after the Central Government granted in-principle approval for the expressway. the tender was awarded in January 2021, and budget was approved. In December 2021 Dec, Prime Minister Narendra Modi laid the Foundation stone. In December 2021, tender for "Roorkee-Haridwar Expressway" spur was awarded to Krishna Constellation, and in January 2022, the tender for Shamli–Ambala Expressway was invited. The expressway was developed in three phases:

- Phase I - brownfield: 32-kilometre-long (20 mi), 6-lane stretch between Akshardham (Delhi) and proposed EPE Junction.
- Phase II - greenfield: between proposed EPE Junction in Delhi and Ganeshpur near Saharanpur bypass.
- Phase III - greenfield: Expressway Stretch between Ganeshpur near Saharanpur bypass and Dehradun.

== Features ==
A 12-kilometre-long (7.5 mi) elevated corridor over the Rajaji National Park to protect wildlife is the second highway in India to have a wildlife protection corridor after NH-44. The ₹13,000 crore expressway reduces the distance between the Delhi and Dehradun from 250 kilometres (160 mi) to 210 kilometres (130 mi), while journey time is reduced from 5 hours to only 2.5 hours.

- Length: 210 kilometres (130 mi).
- Number of lanes: 6 (expandable to 8 lanes).
- Entry and exit points: 16.
- Railway overbridges: 5.
- Road underpasses: 113.
- Wildlife corridor: 14 km long elevated one corridor through Rajaji National Park just south of Dehradun.
- Tunnel: 1 at Datkali (Daat Kali temple), 340 meter long at the south end of elevated wildlife corridor.
- Toll Structure: The expressway has five toll plazas for traffic and revenue management. As of 2026, the toll for cars travelling the full length of the corridor between Delhi and Dehradun is approximately ₹670–675 for a one-way trip, while vehicles entering or exiting within Delhi are not subject to toll charges.

== Route ==
=== Existing main route ===
Main route Delhi–Saharanpur–Dehradun Expressway:

- Delhi-EPE (Eastern Peripheral Expressway): 12 lanes from Akshardham Temple Delhi to 32 kilometres (20 mi) away intersection at Khekra with Eastern Peripheral Expressway (EPE) near east of Baghpat. 6.4 kilometres (4.0 mi) from Geeta Colony to Khajoori Khas is elevated.

- EPE-Saharanpur: 118-kilometre-long (73 mi) route with six lanes, seven interchanges and 60 underpasses from EPE to Saharanpur east bypass via
  - Mandola Vihar Yojna (Near Mandola Village),
  - Khekra (Baghpat eastern bypass),
  - Lohadda (Baraut eastern bypass),
  - Karaunda Mahajan (intersects NH 709A Karnal-Meerut) Highway,
  - Karoda Hathi - Babri (intersects NH 709AD Panipat-Nagina) Highway,
  - Gogwan Jalalpur (just south east of Thanabhawan, intersects NH 344GM Ambala-Shamli Expressway.
  - Halgoya at 108-kilometre (67 mi) milestone, intersects NH 344BG Saharanpur-Haridwar Expressway,
  - Latifpur Aht (next to Lakhnaur on Saharanpur east bypass, at 119 km).

- Saharanpur-Rajaji National Park: 40-kilometre-long (25 mi) route with six lanes from Saharanpur east bypass to Ganeshpur in NH 307 Latifpur Aht at southern entrance of Rajaji National Park.

- Rajaji National Park–Dehradun: 19.5-kilometre-long (12.1 mi) route runs through a two-tube tunnel of total 2.322 kilometres (1.443 mi) length, then 4.82-kilometre-long (3.00 mi) four-lane elevated flyover of 6-metre (20 ft) vertical clearance underneath for elephants and wildlife, then 2.12-kilometre (1.32 mi) at-grade hill route, and 340-metre (1,120 ft) single-tube tunnel.

=== Existing spur ===
==== Haridwar spur ====
- Saharanpur-Roorkee-Haridwar Expressway (Saharanpur-Haridwar Expressway or Haridwar Expressway Spur): 50.7-kilometre (31.5 mi) route begins at Sohanchida Mast from 108-kilometre (67 mi) milestone of Delhi–Saharanpur–Dehradun Expressway southeast of Saharanpur, forms north bypass to Roorkee, and ends at Bahadarabad on Haridwar west ringroad. This will have direct connectivity with the proposed Haridwar International Airport in the south or Haridwar, which will come up by 2030.

=== Proposed extension ===
==== Mussoorie extension ====
Dehradun-Mussoorie Elevated Expressway (Dehradun-Mussoorie Expressway): Delhi-Dehradun Expressway's Dehradun to Mussoorie 26 km elevated extension along the banks of Rispana River (Rispana Rao) and Bindal River (Bindal Rao) has the budgeted cost of 6,100 crore. In May 2025, in a 2 weeks exercise 2,614 houses were identified and marked for demolished for the construction of this extension.

== Inter-connectivity ==
This expressway connects with the following, listed from north to south:

- Char Dham Highway via Haridwar spur of Delhi–Dehradun Expressway, from southeast of Saharanpur.
- Ambala-Shamli Expressway (part of Bareilly–Ludhiana Economic Corridor Expressway), which in turn connects to the Bareilly-Gorakhpur Expressway and then to Siliguri–Gorakhpur Expressway.
- Delhi Meerut Expressway
- Eastern Peripheral Expressway between Delhi and Baghpat.

== Status updates ==
- July 2025: Delhi-Dehradun Expressway's some section are already operational since early 2025, and the rest will be completed and operationalised by mid 2026.
- December 2025: Akshardham to Bagpat stretch (18 KM) already open for commuters. The entire stretch of the Expressway is expected to open by mid January 2026. The current progress stands at 98%.
- January 2026: Package 3 and 4 are partially open for commuters while the Saharanpur Stretch is undergoing road signage and lane marking related works. Entire stretch of the Expressway will be ready for inauguration by March 2026.
- April 2026: Inaugurated by Prime Minister on April 14. Some cosmetic touch ups are being added to this date.#

== See also ==
- National Highway 709B (India), spur of NH-9 from Akshardham to Saharanpur running parallel on the west side of Delhi-Dehradun Expressway
- Industrial Corridors of India
