= Chaudhary Munawwar Hasan =

Indian politician

Member of Parliament, Lok Sabha
- In office May 2004 – December 2008
- Preceded by: S. Saiduzzaman
- Succeeded by: Kadir Rana
- Constituency: Muzaffarnagar
- In office May 1996 – March 1998
- Preceded by: Harpal Singh Panwar
- Succeeded by: Virendra Verma
- Constituency: Kairana

Member of Parliament, Rajya Sabha
- In office July 1998 – January 2004
- Constituency: Uttar Pradesh

Member of Uttar Pradesh Legislative Council
- In office January 2004 – May 2004
- Constituency: Muzaffarnagar Saharanpur Local Authorities

Member of Uttar Pradesh Legislative Assembly
- In office June 1991 – October 1996
- Preceded by: Rajeshwar Bansal
- Succeeded by: Hukum Singh
- Constituency: Kairana

Personal details
- Born: 15 May 1964 Kairana, Uttar Pradesh, India
- Died: 10 December 2008 (aged 44) Palwal, Haryana, India
- Party: Samajwadi Party
- Spouse: Begum Tabassum Hasan (m.1986)
- Children: Nahid Hasan; Iqra Hasan

Chaudhary Munawwar Hasan (15 May 1964 – 10 December 2008) was an MP and political activist during Mulayam Singh Yadav's Government between 2003 and 2007.

== Personal life ==
Munawwar was born in a Muslim Gujjar family to Akhtar Hasan, who was also an MP. One of his ancestors converted to Islam around the turn of the 1900s and the branch of his family which remained Hindu, which include Hukum Singh, are now political rivals. He had four brothers and three sisters, was married to Begum Tabassum Hasan, and had one son (Nahid Hasan) and one daughter (Iqra Hassan).

== Political life ==
Munawwar was elected to the State Legislative assembly from Kairana Assembly constituency in 1991 and 1993 by defeating Hukum Singh. Hasan then elected to Lok Sabha in 1996 on a Samajwadi Party ticket. He was again elected on a Samajwadi Party ticket from Muzaffarnagar in Uttar Pradesh in 2004, but rebelled at the time of 22 July trust vote. He was expelled by the Samajwadi Party, which also filed a petition seeking his disqualification from the House. The petition was pending with the Lok Sabha Speaker. He later joined the Bahujan Samaj Party. SP chief Mulayam Singh Yadav sent Hasan to Rajya Sabha in 1998 after he lost the lok sabha election to Virendra Verma.

== Death ==
He was killed in a road accident near Palwal in the state of Haryana in 2008.

== Positions held ==
Year	Description
1991–1993	Member, Uttar Pradesh Legislative Assembly
1993–1996	Member, Uttar Pradesh Legislative Assembly (2nd term)
1996–1998	Elected to 11th Lok Sabha: Member, Committee on Railways; Member, House Committee; Member, Committee on Transport and Tourism; Member, Committee on Agriculture
1998–2004	Member, Rajya Sabha: Member, Consultative Committee, Ministry of Tourism
2004-2004	Member, Uttar Pradesh Legislative Council
2004–2008	Re-elected to 14th Lok Sabha (2nd term): Member, Committee on Labour; Member, Committee on MPLADS

== Elections contested ==
Year	Election Type	Constituency	Result	Vote percentage	Opposition Candidate	Opposition Party	Opposition vote percentage	Ref
1991	MLA	Kairana	Won	42.34%	Hukum Singh	INC	27.80%	
1993	MLA	Kairana	Won	37.94%	Hukum Singh	INC	32.16%	
1996	MP	Kairana	Won	32.75%	Udai Veer Singh	BJP	30.97%	
1998	MP	Kairana	Lost	31.50%	Virendra Verma	BJP	40.13%	
1999	MP	Kairana	Lost	19.39%	Amir Alam Khan	RLD	29.82%	
2004	MP	Muzaffarnagar	Won	35.51%	Amarpal Singh	BJP	27.51%	
