= Tejendra Nirwal =

Indian politician

Member of the Uttar Pradesh Legislative Assembly
- In office March 2017 – 2022
- Preceded by: Pankaj Kumar Malik
- Succeeded by: Persann Kumar Chaudhary
- Constituency: Shamli

Personal details
- Born: Majara Road Shamli, Uttar Pradesh, India
- Party: Bharatiya Janata Party
- Education: MA and LLB from Chaudhary Charan Singh University, Meerut
- Occupation: MLA
- Profession: Politician

Tejendra Nirwal is an Indian politician. He belongs to the Bharatiya Janata Party. He is a member of Seventeenth Legislative Assembly of Uttar Pradesh representing the Shamli assembly constituency. Nirwal is 51 years old (2017) and a post-graduate.

== Political career ==
Tejendra Nirwal has been a member of the 17th Legislative Assembly of Uttar Pradesh. Since 2017, he has represented the Shamli constituency and is a member of the Bhartiya Janata Party.

In 2017 elections he defeated Indian National Congress candidate Pankaj Kumar Malik, by a margin of 29,720 votes.

== Posts held ==
#	From	To	Position	Comments
01	2017	2022	Member, 17th Legislative Assembly	
