= Kairana =

Town in Uttar Pradesh, India

- Municipality
- Nickname: Kairana (Uttar Pradesh)
- Interactive map of Kairana
- Country: India
- State: Uttar Pradesh
- District: Shamli

Government
  - Type: Municipality
  - Chairperson: Shamshad Ansari
  - Member of Parliament: Iqra Choudhary
  - Member of Legislative Assembly: Nahid Hasan
- Elevation: 242 m (794 ft)

Population (2011)
  - Total: 89,000

Language
  - Official: Hindi
  - Additional official: Urdu
- Time zone: UTC+5:30 (IST)
- PIN: 247774
- Telephone code: 01398
- Vehicle registration: UP-19
- Lok Sabha constituency: Kairana
- Vidhan Sabha constituency: Kairana

Kairana (Hindi pronunciation: [kɛːɾaːn̪aː]) is a city and a municipal board in Shamli district of the Indian state of Uttar Pradesh. It is approximately 14 km (8.7 mi) from Shamli city. Its name is also associated with the Kirana gharana of Hindustani classical music.

== Demographics ==
As of 2011 Indian Census, Kairana had a total population of 89,000, of which 47,047 were males and 41,953 were females. Population within the age group of 0 to 6 years was 16,074. The total number of literates in Kairana was 34,441, which constituted 38.7% of the population with male literacy of 45.4% and female literacy of 31.2%. The effective literacy rate of 7+ population of Kairana was 47.2%, of which male literacy rate was 55.2% and female literacy rate was 38.2%. The Scheduled Castes and Scheduled Tribes population was 5,087 and 8 respectively. Kairana had 13951 households in 2011.

As of the 2001 India census, Kairana had a population of 73,046. Male population is 38,849 and female population is 34,197. In Kairana, 21.7% of the population was in the age group of 0–6 years. In Kairana, the population of literates was 21,539, which constituted 29.5% of the total population. The effective literacy of population seven years and above was 37.6%.

== Migration ==
Kairana and Kandhla migration row (also known as Kairana exodus) refers to mass migration of Hindu families from Kairana and Kandhla in the Indian state of Uttar Pradesh during the period 2014–16. Media sources have stated that the migration was due to threats of extortion from Mukim Kala, described as a "gangster." The National Human Rights Commission issued a notice to the Uttar Pradesh government regarding the migration from Kairana. Bharatiya Janata Party politician Hukum Singh released a list of 346 Hindu families which had migrated from Kairana. On 14 June, he released another list, this time containing the names of migrant families from Kandhla. Both these list and the subsequent response have received extensive media coverage . Several families have reportedly deserted the city due to extortion and loot by goons of gangsters like Mukim Kala. Many families have reportedly been forced to shift to nearby Haryana villages due to the terror. Locals said they were getting threats on phone and through letters. If one refuses to give protection money, he is killed by the henchmen. They have no option but to leave the city to save their lives. However it was also reported that many migrated not because of communalism, but crime.

National Human Rights Commission confirmed the exodus in an inquiry which also cited the influx of Muzaffarnagar Riot refugees as exacerbating the harmony in Kairana.

== Places of interest ==
There are many religious and natural attractions in and around Kairana. Of these, are mainly the Nagarpalika building and procession house, Devi Mandir and Talab, Nawab Talab, Jain Mandir and Bagh, Imambara, Gaushala, Idgah and many shrines including Nogza Pir, Public Inter College Kairana, the Yamuna river at 6 km (3.7 mi).

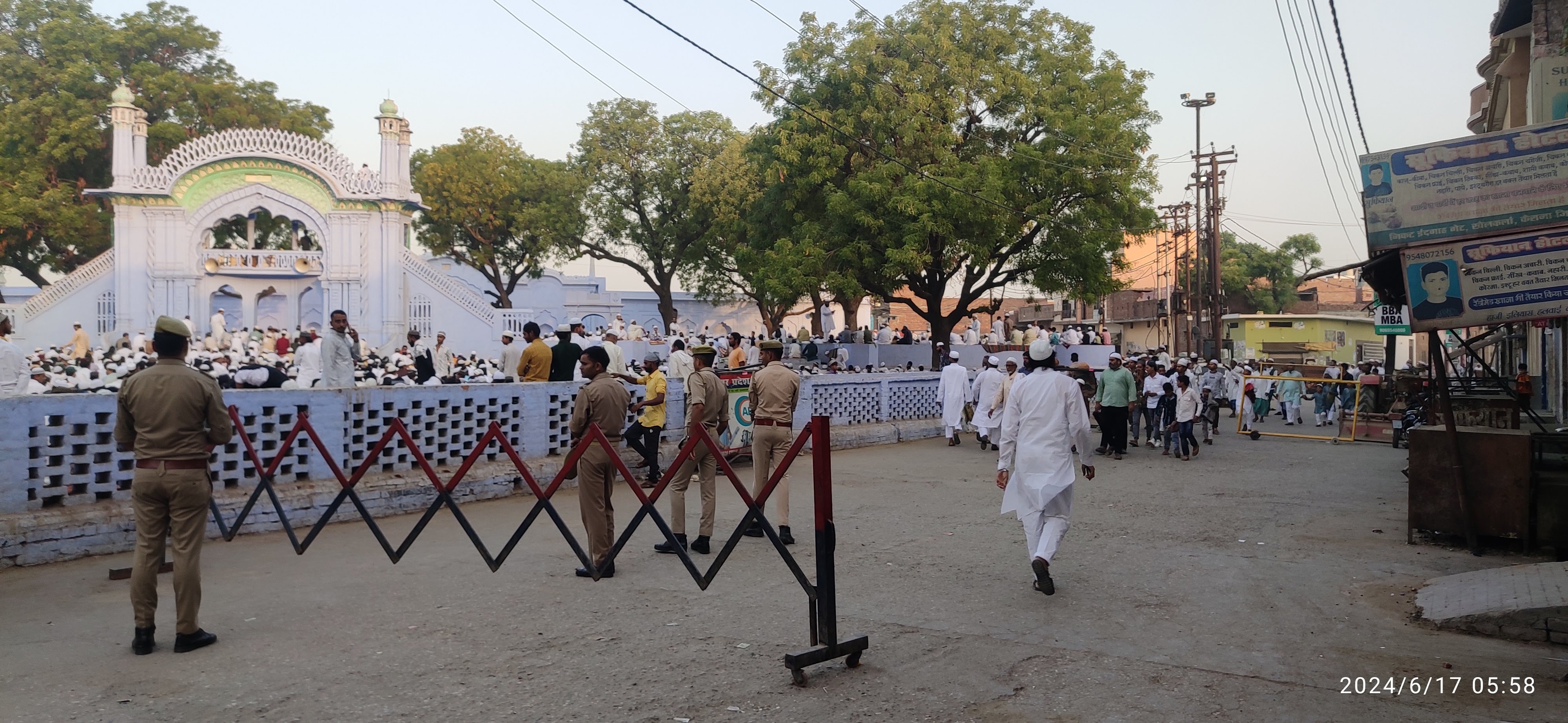
idgah kairana in 2024

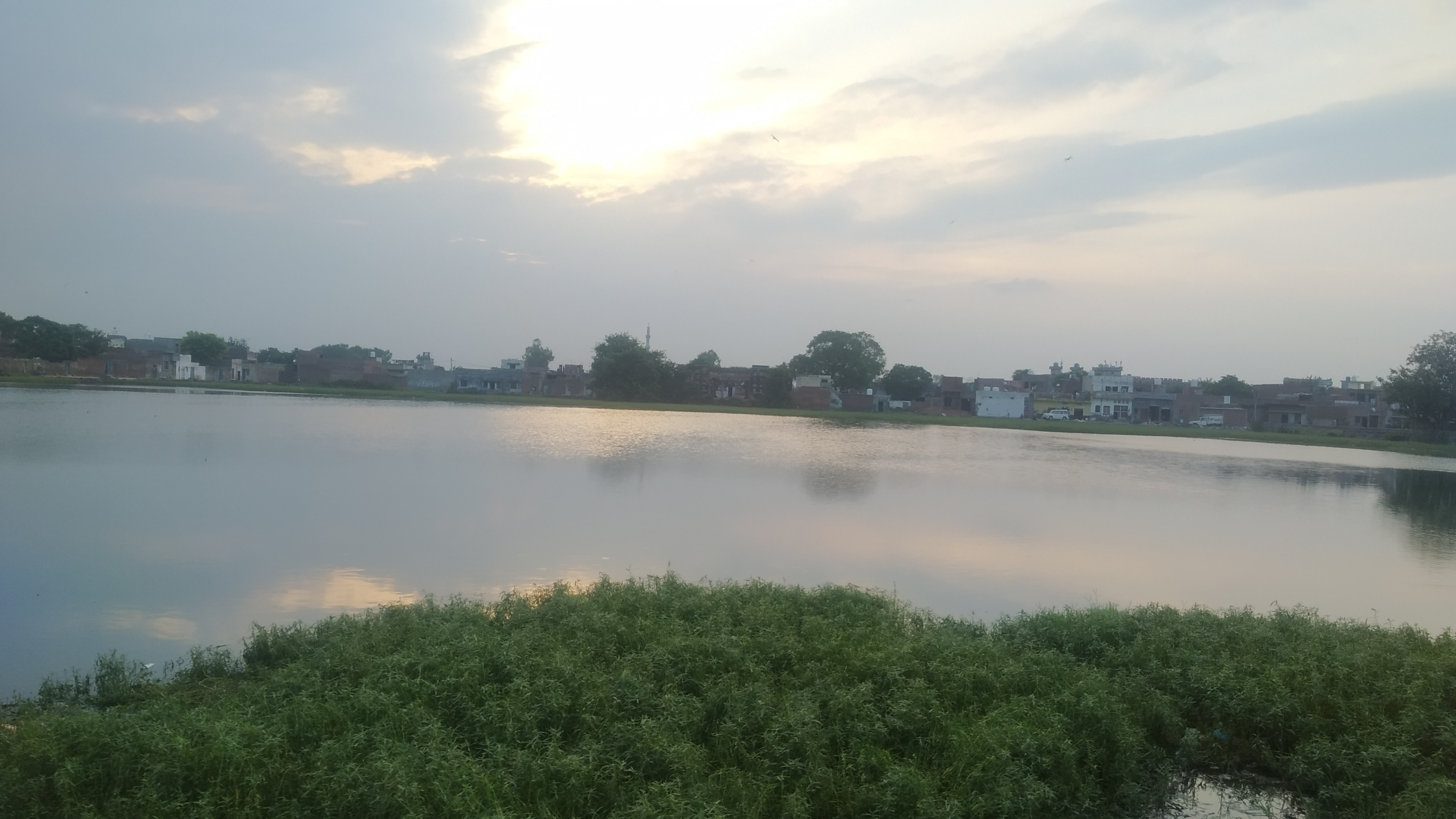
Nawab Talab, Kairana

== Notable people ==
- Rahmatullah Kairanawi
- Shabab Kiranwi
- Begum Tabassum Hasan
- Chaudhary Munawwar Hasan former MP
- Hukum Singh former MP
- Abdul Karim Khan
- Jamil Naqsh
