= Kandhla Assembly constituency =

Former constituency of the Uttar Pradesh legislative assembly in India

Coordinates: 29.32°N 77.27°E

Kandhla
- Former constituency for the Uttar Pradesh Legislative Assembly

Constituency details
- Country: India
- Region: North India
- State: Uttar Pradesh
- District: Muzaffarnagar
- Established: 1967
- Abolished: 2012

Kandhla Assembly constituency was one of the 403 constituencies of the Uttar Pradesh Legislative Assembly, India. It was a part of the Muzaffarnagar district and one of five assembly constituencies in the Kairana (Lok Sabha constituency).

Kandhla Assembly constituency demolished in 2008 as a result of the "Delimitation of Parliamentary and Assembly Constituencies Order, 2008".

== Members of the Legislative Assembly ==
#	Term	Name	Party	From	To	Days	Comments	Ref
01	04th Vidhan Sabha	Virendra Verma	Indian National Congress	Mar-1967	Apr-1968	402	-	
02	05th Vidhan Sabha	Ajab Singh	Bharatiya Kranti Dal	Feb-1969	Mar-1974	1,832	-	
03	06th Vidhan Sabha	Mool Chand	Bharatiya Kranti Dal	Mar-1974	Apr-1977	1,153	-	
04	07th Vidhan Sabha	Ajab Singh	Janata Party	Jun-1977	Feb-1980	969	-	
05	08th Vidhan Sabha	Choudhary Virender Singh	Janata Party	Jun-1980	Mar-1985	1,735	-	
06	09th Vidhan Sabha	Choudhary Virender Singh	Lokdal	Mar-1985	Nov-1989	1,725	-	
07	10th Vidhan Sabha	Choudhary Virender Singh	Janata Dal	Dec-1989	Apr-1991	488	-	
08	11th Vidhan Sabha	Choudhary Virender Singh	Janata Dal	Jun-1991	Dec-1992	533	-	
09	12th Vidhan Sabha	Ratan Pal Panwar	Bharatiya Janata Party	Dec-1993	Oct-1995	693	-	
10	13th Vidhan Sabha	Choudhary Virender Singh	Bharatiya Kisan Kamgaar Party	Oct-1996	May-2002	1,967	-	
11	14th Vidhan Sabha	Choudhary Virender Singh	Rashtriya Lok Dal	Feb-2002	May-2007	1,902	-	
12	15th Vidhan Sabha	Balveer Singh	Bahujan Samaj Party	May-2007	Mar-2012	1,762	-	

== Election results ==
=== 1977 ===
1977 Uttar Pradesh Legislative Assembly election: Kandhla
Party	Candidate	Votes	%	±%
JP	Ajab Singh	36,265	58.30%	−
INC	Mohd Said	25,944	41.70%	−
Majority		10,391		−
Turnout			52.22	−
JP hold		Swing		

=== 6th Vidhan Sabha: 1969 General Elections. ===
1969 General Elections: Kandhla
Party	Candidate	Votes	%	±%
JP	Ajab Singh	39,469	49.52%	−
INC	Shafquat Jung	17,427	21.86%	−
CPI	Vijay Pal Singh	15,125	18.98%	−
ABJS	Ishwar Dayal	3,898	4.89%	−
RPI	Sukkha	2,890	3.63	−
SWA	Pitam Singh	895	1.12	−
Majority		22,042		−
Turnout			67.67	−
		Swing		

== See also ==
- Kandhla
- Government of Uttar Pradesh
- List of Vidhan Sabha constituencies of Uttar Pradesh
- Uttar Pradesh
- Uttar Pradesh Legislative Assembly
