= Thana Bhawan Assembly constituency =

Constituency of the Uttar Pradesh legislative assembly in India

Thana Bhawan
- Constituency No. 9 for the Uttar Pradesh Legislative Assembly

Constituency details
- Country: India
- Region: North India
- State: Uttar Pradesh
- District: Shamli
- Total electors: 285,142 (2012)
- Reservation: None

Member of Legislative Assembly
- 18th Uttar Pradesh Legislative Assembly
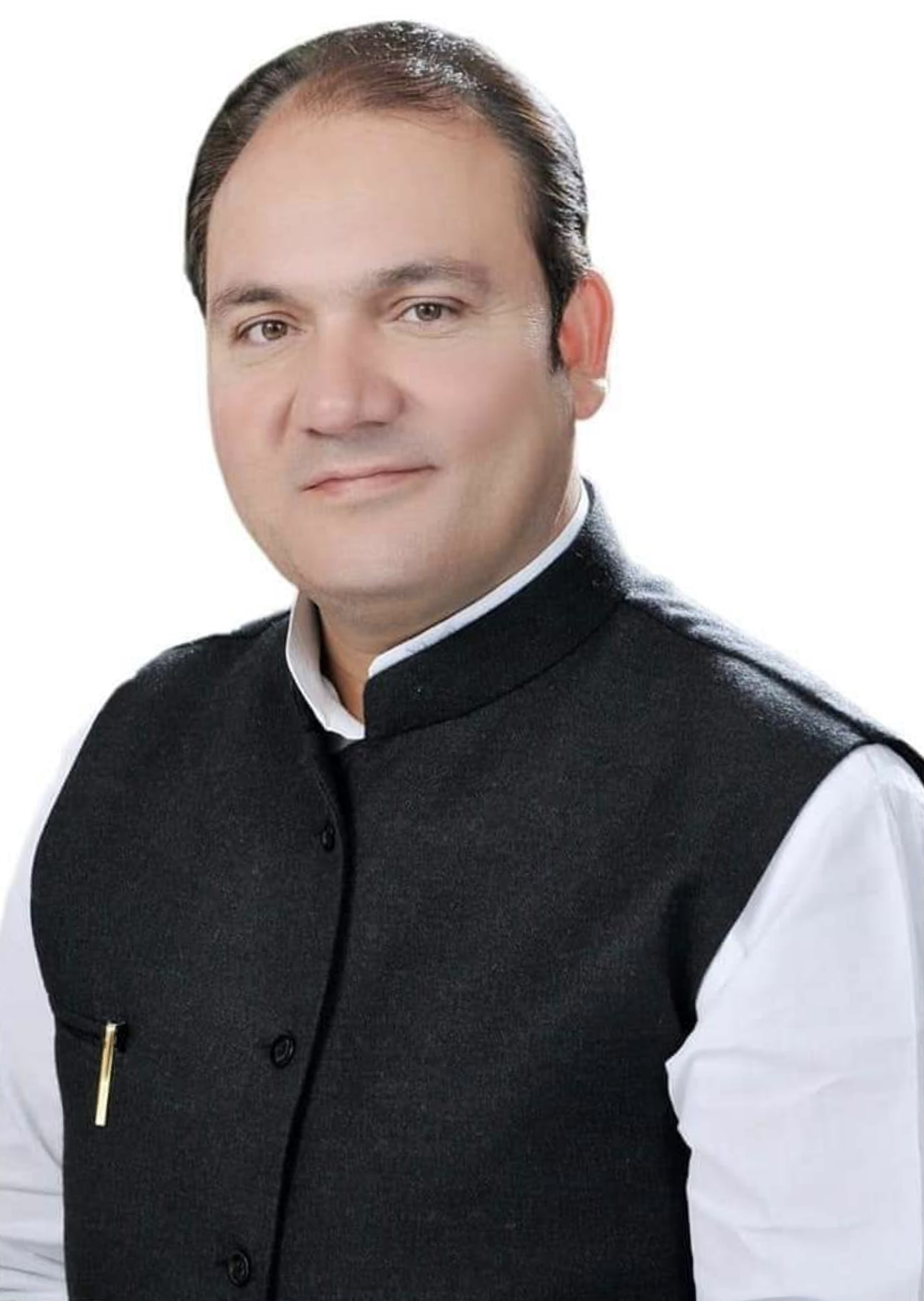
- Incumbent Ashraf Ali Khan
- Party: RLD
- Alliance: NDA
- Elected year: 2022

Thana Bhawan Assembly constituency is one of the 403 constituencies of the Uttar Pradesh Legislative Assembly, India. It is a part of the Shamli district (prior to 2012, Thana Bhawan was a part of Muzaffarnagar district) and one of the five assembly constituencies in the Kairana Lok Sabha constituency. First elections in Thana Bhawan Assembly constituency were held in 1974 after the "Delimitation Orders (1967)" was passed. The extant and serial number of this constituency was last defined in "Delimitation of Parliamentary and Assembly Constituencies Order, 2008".

== Wards / Areas ==
Extent of Thana Bhawan Assembly is Thana Bhawan, Taprana, Purmafee, Nonagali, Silawar, Gadhipukhta, Malandi, Tana, Goharni, Rajhad, Bhainswal-1, Sikka, Kairi, Babri, Butrada, Sonta, Banti Kheda, Karodahathi, Kaservakalan, Titauli of Shamli KC, Garhi pukhta NP, Thana Bhawan NP & Jalalabad NP of Shamli Tehsil; PCs Pindaura Jahangirpur, Hathchhoya & Mundet of Un KC of Kairana Tehsil in Shamli district.

== Members of the Legislative Assembly ==
Year	Member	Party
1969	Rao Rafey khan	Bharatiya Kranti Dal
1974	Malkhan Singh	Indian National Congress
1977	Mool Chand	Janata Party
1980	Somansh Prakash	Indian National Congress
1985	Amir Alam Khan	Lok Dal
1989	Nakli Singh	Indian National Congress
1991	Somansh Prakash	Janata Dal
1993	Jagat Singh	Bharatiya Janata Party
1996	Amir Alam Khan	Samajwadi Party
2000^	Jagat Singh	Samajwadi Party
2002	Kiran Pal	Samajwadi Party
2007	Abdul Warish Khan	Rashtriya Lok Dal
2012	Suresh Rana	Bharatiya Janata Party
2017	Suresh Rana	Bharatiya Janata Party
2022	Ashraf Ali Khan	Rashtriya Lok Dal

== Election results ==
=== 2027 ===
2027 Uttar Pradesh Legislative Assembly election: Thana Bhawan
Party	Candidate	Votes	%	±%
INDIA				
NDA				
BSP				
NOTA	None of the above			
Majority				
Turnout				
gain from		Swing		

=== 2022 ===
2022 Uttar Pradesh Legislative Assembly election: Thana Bhawan
Party	Candidate	Votes	%	±%
RLD	Ashraf Ali Khan	103,751	47.47	▲32.77
BJP	Suresh Rana	92,945	42.53	▼0.25
BSP	Zaheer Malik	11,039	5.05	▼29.83
Independent	Sherpal Singh	3,975	1.82	
ASP(KR)	Rakesh Kumar	3,188	1.46	
NOTA	None of the above	789	0.36	▼0.06
Majority		10,806	4.94	▼2.96
Turnout		218,541	66.87	▼1.43
RLD gain from BJP		Swing		

=== 2017 ===
2017 Uttar Pradesh Legislative Assembly election: Thana Bhawan
Party	Candidate	Votes	%	±%
BJP	Suresh Rana	90,995	42.78	
BSP	Abdul Warish Khan	74,178	34.88	
RLD	Javed Rao Khan	31,275	14.7	
SP	Sudhir Kumar	13,480	6.34	
NOTA	None of the above	883	0.42	
Majority		16,817	7.9	
Turnout		212,691	68.3	
BJP hold		Swing	+12.28	

=== 2012 ===
2012 Uttar Pradesh Legislative Assembly election: Thana Bhawan
Party	Candidate	Votes	%	±%
BJP	Suresh Rana	53,719	30.68	+14.63
RLD	Ashraf Ali Khan	53,454	30.52	+0.17
BSP	Abdul Warish Khan	50,001	28.55	+2.18
SP	Kiran Pal Kashyap	10,198	5.82	−5.93
Kisanwadi Party	Sunil Kumar Arya	7,745	4.42	−
Majority		265	0.15	−
Turnout		175,117	61.41	+8.47
BJP gain from RLD		Swing	+14.63	

=== 2007 ===
2007 Uttar Pradesh Legislative Assembly election: Thana Bhawan
Party	Candidate	Votes	%	±%
RLD	Abdul Warish Khan	41,204	30.35	
BSP	Anoop Singh	35,801	26.37	
BJP	Suresh Rana	21,791	16.05	
SP	Kiran Pal Kashyap	15,965	11.75	
INC	Somansh Prakash	12,966	9.55	
	Remainder 17 candidates	8,012	5.90	
Majority		5,403	3.98	
Turnout		135,739	52.94	
RLD gain from SP		Swing	-	

== See also ==
- Shamli district
- Kairana Lok Sabha constituency
- List of constituencies of the Uttar Pradesh Legislative Assembly
