= Pankaj Kumar Malik =

Indian politician (born 1978)

Pankaj kumar Malik

MLA in 18th Uttar Pradesh Assembly
- In office March 2022 – Incumbent
- Preceded by: Vijay Kumar Kashyap
- Constituency: Charthawal

MLA in 16th Uttar Pradesh Assembly
- In office March 2012 – March 2017
- Succeeded by: Tejendra Nirwal
- Constituency: Shamli

MLA in 15th Uttar Pradesh Assembly
- In office May 2007 – March 2012
- Preceded by: Paramjeet Malik
- Constituency: Baghra

Personal details
- Born: 6 December 1978 (age 47) Muzaffarnagar, Uttar Pradesh, India
- Party: Samajwadi Party 2021–present
- Other political affiliations: Indian National Congress (2004–2021)

Chaudhary Pankaj Singh Malik (born 6 December 1978) is an Indian politician and member of the 18th Legislative Assembly of Uttar Pradesh. Malik represented the Charthawal constituency of Uttar Pradesh and is a member of the Samajwadi Party.

== Early life and education ==
Malik was born in Muzaffarnagar, Uttar Pradesh, India in 1978. He holds a LL.B. degree from D.A.V. College, Muzaffarnagar. Prior to joining politics, he was an agriculturist by profession.

== Political career ==
Malik started his political career in Baghra by election 2004 where he was defeated by Rashtriya Lok Dal candidate Paramjeet Singh Malik by 3701 votes. He has been a MLA for two straight terms from 2007 to 2017. He represented Baghra (Assembly constituency) in 15th legislative assembly and Shamli (Assembly constituency) in 16th legislative assembly. Currently he is a member of the Samajwadi Party and MLA from Charthawal (Assembly constituency).

== Posts held ==
#	From	To	Position	Comments
01	2007	2012	Member, 15th Legislative Assembly	
02	2012	2017	Member, 16th Legislative Assembly	
02	2022	Incumbent	Member, 18th Uttar Pradesh Assembly	

== Elections contested ==
Year	Election Type	Constituency	Result	Votes Secured	Opposition Candidate	Opposition Party	Opposition vote	Ref
2004	MLA	Baghra	Lost	39,004	Paramjeet Malik	RLD	42,705	
2007	MLA	Baghra	Won	37,649	Yogendra chairman	RLD	26,188	
2012	MLA	Shamli	Won	53,947	Choudhary Virender Singh	SP	50,206	
2017	MLA	Shamli	Lost	40,365	Tejendra Nirwal	BJP	70,085	
2022	MLA	Charthawal	Won	97,363	Sapna Kashyap	BJP	92,029	

== See also ==
- Indian National Congress
- Politics of India
- Shamli (Assembly constituency)
- Sixteenth Legislative Assembly of Uttar Pradesh
- Uttar Pradesh Legislative Assembly
