= Bhaisani Islampur =

Village in Uttar Pradesh, India

Coordinates: 29°34′N 77°28′E

Bhaisani Islampur is a village in Shamli district, Uttar Pradesh, India.
