= Pelkha =

- Village
- Interactive map of Pelkha
- Coordinates: 29°52′N 77°29′E
- Country: India
- State: Uttar Pradesh
- District: Shamli

Government
  - Body: Gram panchayat

Languages
  - Official: Hindi
- Time zone: UTC+5:30 (IST)
- Postal code: 2477 76
- ISO 3166 code: UP-IN
- Coastline: 0 kilometres (0 mi)

Pelkha is a village 10 km (6.2 mi) north-west of Shamli in the district of Shamli in the state of Uttar Pradesh, India.

== Gallery ==
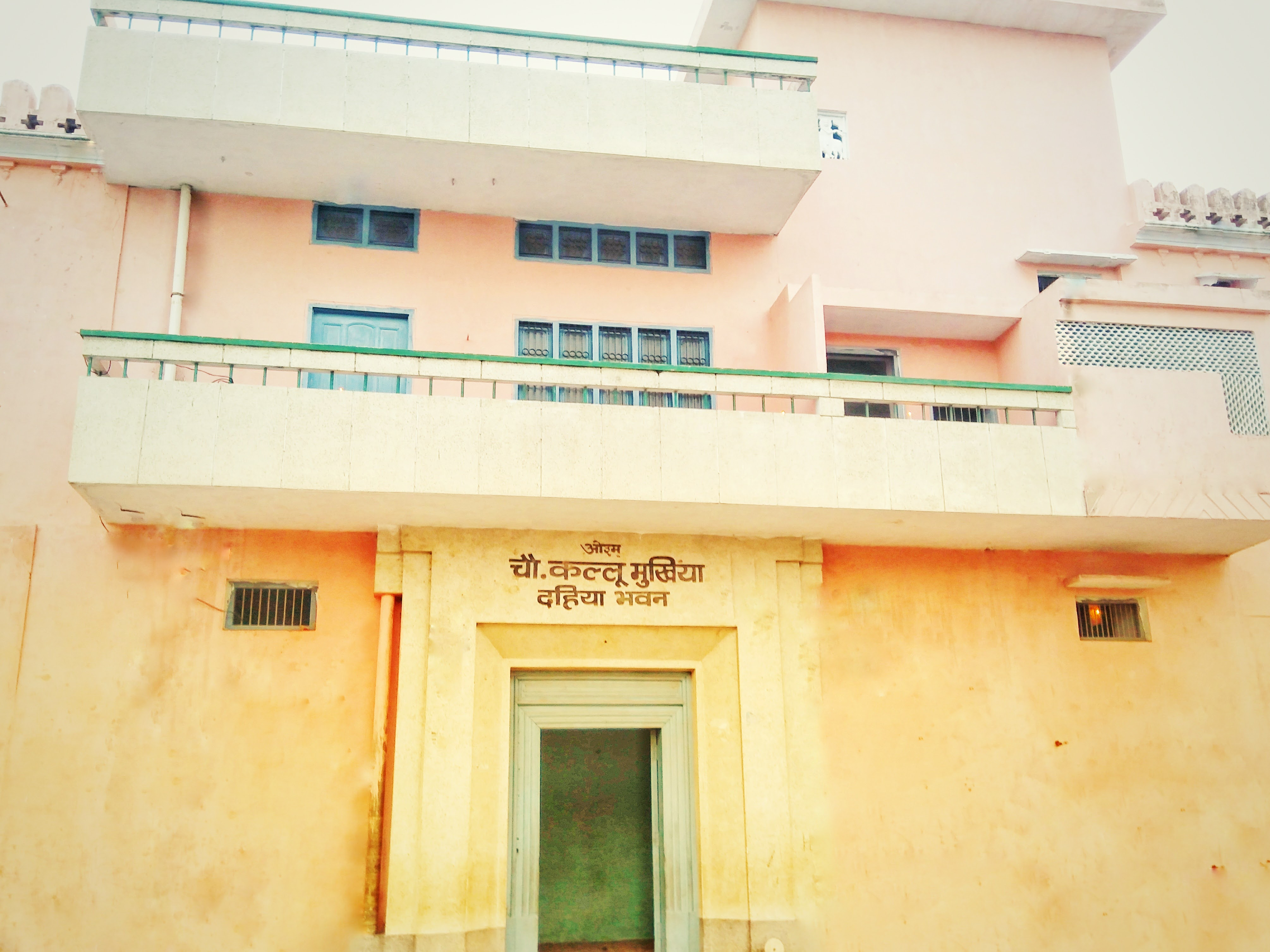
Kallu Mukhiya Dahiya and Bhullan Dahiya Bhawan engraved on white marble at entrance. An old gate leading to the Haveli of Chaudhary Kallu Singh in Pelkha

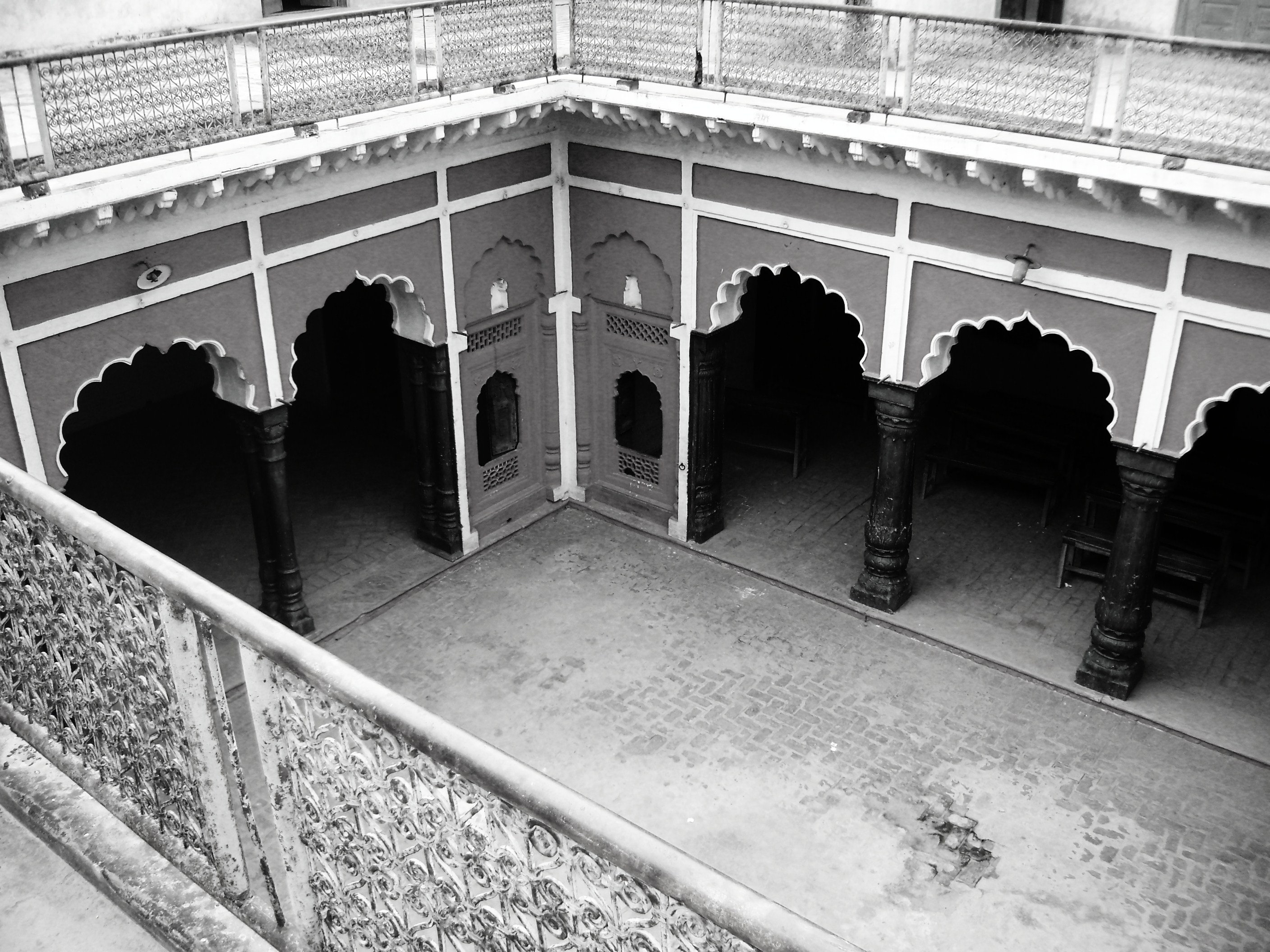
Chaudhary Kallu Singh and Bhullan Singh Haveli in Pelkha

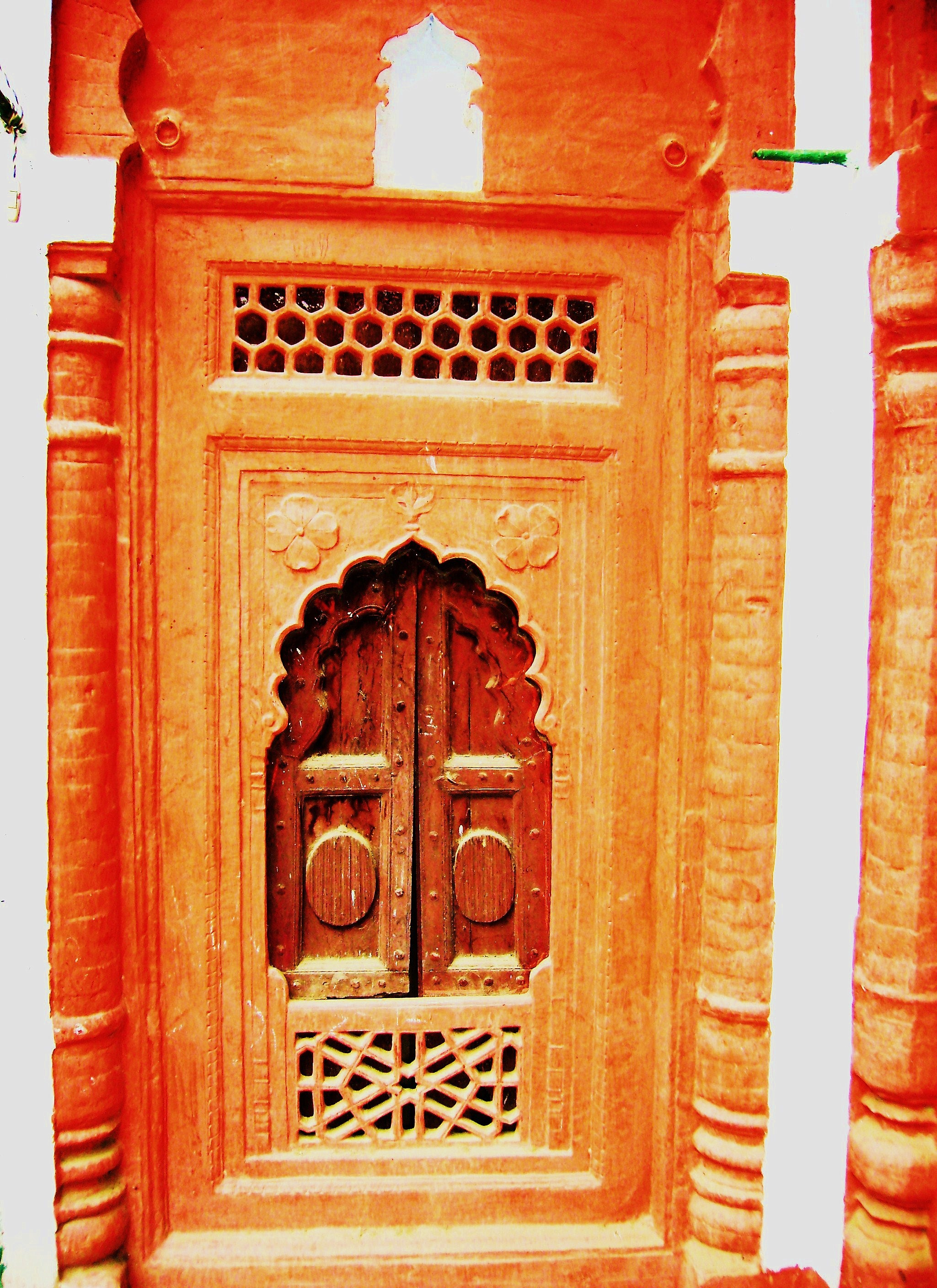
Intricate work at the Pelkha Haveli

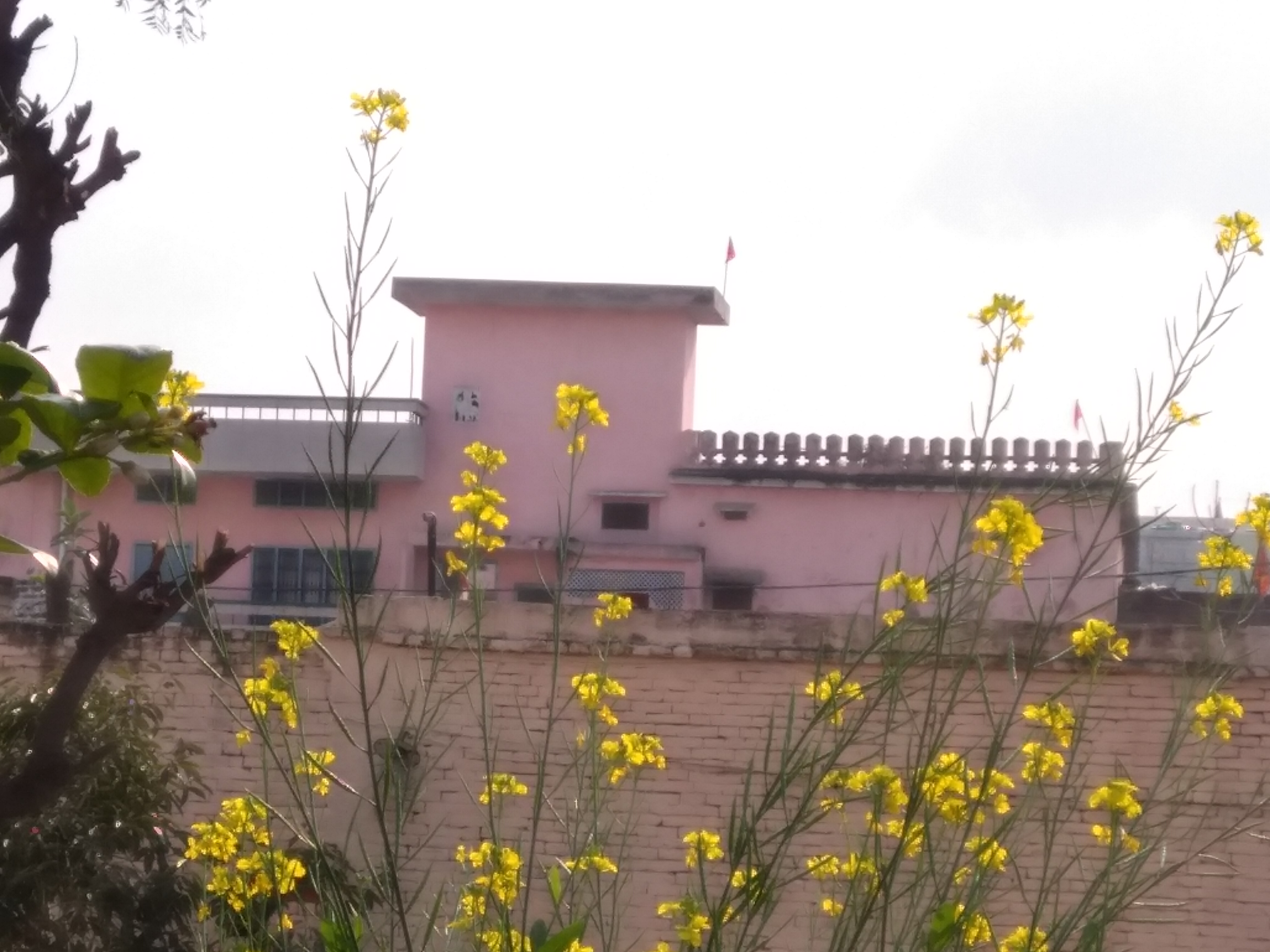
Distant view of Haveli
