= Bidoli Sadat =

Bidoli Sadat is a small village in the Shamli district), Uttar Pradesh, India.
