= Shamli Assembly constituency =

Vidhan Sabha constituency in Uttar Pradesh, India

Shamli
- Constituency No. 10 for the Uttar Pradesh Legislative Assembly
- Incumbent MLA Persann Chaudhary

Constituency details
- Country: India
- Region: North India
- State: Uttar Pradesh
- District: Shamli
- Total electors: 311,974
- Reservation: None

Member of Legislative Assembly
- 18th Uttar Pradesh Legislative Assembly
- Incumbent Persann Kumar Chaudhary
- Party: RLD
- Alliance: NDA
- Elected year: 2022

Shamli Assembly constituency is one of the 403 constituencies of the Uttar Pradesh Legislative Assembly, India. It is a part of the Shamli district (prior to 2012, Shamli was a part of Muzaffarnagar district) and one of the five assembly constituencies in the Kairana Lok Sabha constituency. First assembly election in this assembly constituency was conducted in 2012 after the constituency came into existence in the year 2008 as a result of the "Delimitation of Parliamentary and Assembly Constituencies Order, 2008". It is a highly Jat dominated constituency with influence of sugarcane farmers.

== Wards and areas ==
Extent of Assembly constituency is Shamli, Banat, Ailum and all other regions of Shamli Tehsil; Kandrawali, Lilon kheri, Aaldi, Kandhala, Gangeru of Kairana Tehsil; Nala, Taharpur Bhabisa, Kaniyan, Salfa & Sunna of Budhana Tehsil.

== Members of the Legislative Assembly ==
Year	Member	Party
Till 2012 : Constituency did not exist
2012	Pankaj Kumar Malik	Indian National Congress
2017	Tejendra Nirwal	Bharatiya Janta Party
2022	Persann Kumar Chaudhary	Rashtriya Lok Dal

== Election results ==
=== 2027 ===
2027 Uttar Pradesh Legislative Assembly election: Shamli
Party	Candidate	Votes	%	±%
INDIA				
NDA				
BSP				
NOTA	None of the above			
Majority				
Turnout				
gain from		Swing		

=== 2022 ===
2022 Uttar Pradesh Legislative Assembly election: Shamli
Party	Candidate	Votes	%	±%
RLD	Persann Kumar Chaudhary	103,070	48.86	▲31.77
BJP	Tejendra Nirwal	95,963	45.49	▲9.8
BSP	Bijendra Malik	8,183	3.88	▼4.84
NOTA	None of the above	799	0.38	▼0.08
Majority		7,107	3.37	▼11.76
Turnout		210,952	67.62	▲2.14
RLD gain from BJP		Swing		

=== 2017 ===
2017 Uttar Pradesh Legislative Assembly election: Shamli
Party	Candidate	Votes	%	±%
BJP	Tejendra Nirwal	70,085	35.69	
INC	Pankaj Kumar Malik	40,365	20.56	
RLD	Bijendra Singh	33,551	17.09	
Independent	Manish Chauhan	31,824	16.21	
BSP	Mohammad Islam	17,114	8.72	
NOTA	None of the above	901	0.46	
Majority		29,720	15.13	
Turnout		196,347	65.48	
BJP gain from INC		Swing	+30.45	

=== 2012 ===
2012 Assembly Elections: Shamli
Party	Candidate	Votes	%	±%
INC	Pankaj Kumar Malik	53,947	32.05	
SP	Choudhary Virender Singh	50,206	29.83	
BSP	Balbir Singh	45,597	27.09	
BJP	Satyendra Verma	9,105	5.41	
	Remaining 22 candidates	9,449	5.61	
Majority		3,741	2.22	
Turnout		1,68,304	60.91	
BJP hold		Swing		

== See also ==
- Government of Uttar Pradesh
- Kairana Lok Sabha constituency
- List of Vidhan Sabha constituencies of Uttar Pradesh
- Shamli district
- Sixteenth Legislative Assembly of Uttar Pradesh
- Uttar Pradesh Legislative Assembly
- Uttar Pradesh
