= Kairana Lok Sabha constituency =

Lok Sabha Constituency in Uttar Pradesh, India

Coordinates: 29.4°N 77.2°E

Kairana UP-2
- Lok Sabha constituency
- Interactive Map Outlining Kairana Lok Sabha constituency

Constituency details
- Country: India
- Region: North India
- State: Uttar Pradesh
- Assembly constituencies: Nakur; Gangoh; Kairana; Thana Bhawan; Shamli
- Established: 1962
- Total electors: 17,22,452
- Reservation: None

Member of Parliament
- 18th Lok Sabha
- Incumbent Iqra Choudhary
- Party: Samajwadi Party
- Alliance: INDIA
- Elected year: 2024

Kairana Lok Sabha constituency (Hindi pronunciation: [kɛːɾaːn̪aː]) is one of the 80 Lok Sabha (parliamentary) constituencies in the Indian state of Uttar Pradesh.

== Vidhan Sabha Segments ==
Presently, Kairana Lok Sabha constituency comprises five Vidhan Sabha (legislative assembly) segments. These are:

No	Name	District	Member	Party	2024 Lead
2	Nakur	Saharanpur	Mukesh Choudhary	BJP	SP
7	Gangoh	Saharanpur	Kirat Singh	BJP	SP
8	Kairana	Shamli	Nahid Hasan	SP	SP
9	Thana Bhawan	Shamli	Ashraf Ali Khan	RLD	SP
10	Shamli	Shamli	Persann Kumar Chaudhary	RLD	BJP

== Members of Lok Sabha ==
Year	Member	Party
1962	Yashpal Singh	Independent
1967	Ghayoor Ali Khan	Samyukta Socialist Party
1971	Shafquat Jung	Indian National Congress
1977	Chandan Singh	Janata Party
1980	Gayatri Devi	Janata Party (Secular)
1984	Akhtar Hasan	Indian National Congress
1989	Harpal Singh Panwar	Janata Dal
1991	Harpal Singh Panwar	Janata Dal
1996	Munawwar Hasan	Samajwadi Party
1998	Virendra Verma	Bharatiya Janata Party
1999	Amir Alam Khan	Rashtriya Lok Dal
2004	Anuradha Choudhary	Rashtriya Lok Dal
2009	Tabassum Hasan	Bahujan Samaj Party
2014	Hukum Singh	Bharatiya Janata Party
2018^	Tabassum Hasan	Rashtriya Lok Dal
2019	Pradeep Chaudhary	Bharatiya Janata Party
2024	Iqra Choudhary	Samajwadi Party

^ by-poll

RLD and BJP are Most successful political parties in Kairana (Uttar Pradesh) Lok Sabha elections
1. RLD (3 terms) (17.6%)
2. BJP (3 terms) (17.6%)
3. SP (2 terms) (11.8%)
4. INC (2 terms) (11.8%)
5. JD (2 terms) (11.8%)
6. JP (1 terms) (5.88%)
7. BSP (1 terms) (5.88%)
8. JP(S) (1 terms) (5.88%)
9. SSP (1 terms) (5.88%)
10. IND (1 terms) (5.88%)

== Elections results ==
=== 2024 Lok Sabha elections ===
2024 Indian general elections:Kairana
Party	Candidate	Votes	%	±%
SP	Iqra Choudhary	530,013	49.90	▲6.66
BJP	Pradeep Choudhary	4,58,897	42.50	▼7.94
BSP	Sripal Singh Rana	76,200	7.06	▲7.06
Azad Adhikar Sena	Ombeer Chaudhary	1,096	0.10	▲0.10
NOTA	None of the Above	3,249	0.30	▼0.02
Majority		69,116	6.40	▼1.80
Turnout		10,79,806	62.69	▼4.76
SP gain from BJP		Swing		

=== 2019 Lok Sabha elections ===
2019 Indian general elections: Kairana
Party	Candidate	Votes	%	±%
BJP	Pradeep Choudhary	566,961	50.43	▼0.11
SP	Tabassum Hasan	474,801	42.23	▲12.84
INC	Harendra Singh Malik	69,355	6.17	▲6.17
NOTA	None of the Above	3,542	0.32	
Majority		92,160	8.20	
Turnout		11,24,047	67.44	▼5.64
BJP gain from RLD		Swing		

=== 2018 bye-election ===
Bye-election, 2018: Kairana
Party	Candidate	Votes	%	±%
RLD	Tabassum Hasan	481,181	51.26	▲47.45
BJP	Mriganka Singh	4,36,564	46.51	−4.03
IND	Ravinder Kumar	3,553	0.38	
IND	Sanjeev	2,760	0.29	
BMP	Inderjeet	2,388	0.25	
NOTA	None of the Above	4,389	0.47	
Majority		44,618	4.75	
Turnout		9,38,742	58.20	▼15.12
RLD gain from BJP		Swing		

=== 2014 Lok Sabha elections ===
2014 Indian general elections: Kairana
Party	Candidate	Votes	%	±%
BJP	Hukum Singh	5,65,909	50.54	
SP	Nahid Hasan	3,29,081	29.49	
BSP	Kanwar Hasan	1,60,414	14.33	
RLD	Kartar Singh Bhadana	42,706	3.81	
AITC	Divakar Kashyap	6,562	0.59	
NOTA	None of the Above	3,903	0.35	
Majority		2,36,628	21.15	
Turnout		11,19,324	73.08	
BJP gain from BSP		Swing		

=== 2004 Lok Sabha elections ===
General Election, 2004: Kairana
Party	Candidate	Votes	%	±%
RLD	Anuradha Choudhary	5,23,923	64.15	
BSP	Shah Nawaz	1,81,509	22.22	
Majority		3,42,414	41.93	
Turnout		8,16,726	66.90	
RLD gain from BSP		Swing		

=== 1999 Lok Sabha elections ===
- Amir Alam (RLD) : 206,345 votes
- Niranjan Singh Malik (BJP) : 168,073

=== General election 1996 ===
1996 Indian general elections: Kairana
Party	Candidate	Votes	%	±%
SP	Munawwar Hasan	1,84,636	32.75	
BJP	Udayveer Singh	1,74,614	30.97	
INC	Yogesh Malik	1,14,389	20.29	
BSP	Zilley Haider	71,035	12.60	
Margin of victory		10,028	1.55	
Turnout		2,97,481	64.99	
SP gain from JD		Swing		

== See also ==
- Shamli district
- List of constituencies of the Lok Sabha
