= Gorakhpur–Siliguri Expressway =

Expressway in India

Route information
- Maintained by National Highways Authority of India (NHAI)
- Length: 519 km (322 mi)
- Existed: 2025 (expected)–present

Major junctions
- West end: Gorakhpur, Uttar Pradesh
- East end: Siliguri, West Bengal

Location
- Country: India
- States: Uttar Pradesh, Bihar and West Bengal
- Major cities: Gorakhpur, Deoria, Kushinagar, Gopalganj, Mehsi, Runni Saidpur, Darbhanga, Madhubani, Supaul, Forbesganj, Araria, Kishanganj, Islampur, Bagdogra and Siliguri

Highway system
- Roads in India; Expressways; National; State; Asian

Gorakhpur–Siliguri Expressway is an under-construction 519 km (322 mi) long, four-lane (expandable to 6) access-controlled greenfield expressway that will connect the Gorakhpur in Uttar Pradesh with Siliguri in West Bengal in India. Designed for speeds of up to 120 kmph, the road will be running almost parallel to the India–Nepal border, reducing both travel time and distance, from 14-15 hours only 8-9 hours, and from 640 km (400 mi) to 519 km (322 mi). This strategic project, which will connect Eastern India to Northeast India will also benefit Nepal, is part of Bharatmala Pariyojana, and passes through three states in India, Uttar Pradesh, Bihar and West Bengal. Planned future extensions include the Siliguri-Guwahati Expressway to Assam's capital Guwahati.

== History ==
=== Conception ===
In 2021, the plan of the expressway was proposed by the Ministry of Road Transport and Highways (MoRTH).

=== Construction ===
Using Detailed Project Report (DPR) by L.N. Malviya Infra Projects Private Limited, built in Engineering, Procurement and Construction (EPC) mode, the project has several contraction packages for tender award.

==== Construction packages by states ====
===== Uttar Pradesh =====
Packages	Chainages (Note: Distances from the origin of the expressway, i.e., Gorakhpur.)	Contractor	Status
Package-1	Gorakhpur Ring Road (Gorakhpur district) to Uttar Pradesh-Bihar border (0.000 km to 84.400 km)	TBD	Bidding process and land acquisition underway

===== Bihar =====
Packages	Chainages	Contractor	Status
Package-1	Junction with National Highway 27 (East-West Corridor) at Forbesganj, Araria district (361.700 km to 382.950 km)	TBD	Bidding process underway
Package-2	Junction with National Highway 327 at Kishanganj district to Bihar-West Bengal border (497.600 to 505.700 km)	TBD	Bidding process underway
Package-3	TBA	TBD	Bidding process underway

===== West Bengal =====
Packages	Chainages	Contractor	Status
Package-1	Junction with National Highway 27 (East-West Corridor) at Bagdogra, Darjeeling district (519.570 km)	TBD	DRA

== Features ==
=== Cost ===
Gorakhpur-Siliguri Expressway project is estimated to cost Rs 38,645 crore as per 2025 estimates, with Bihar contributing Rs 27,552 crore.

=== Rivers and bridges ===
The expressway will cross several major rivers and have bridges over those, including Gandak, Bagmati and Kosi.

== Route ==
=== Length by states ===
Length by states is as follows:

Lengths
	mi	km
Uttar Pradesh	52.4	84.3
Bihar	258.6	416.2
West Bengal	11.79	18.97
Total	322.85	519.58

=== Route by states ===
==== Uttar Pradesh ====
The expressway will start from the Gorakhpur Ring Road, or National Highway 27 (East–West Corridor) (NH-27) at Gorakhpur, Gorakhpur district, and will run mostly parallel with NH-27. It will connect the following districts along with their cities: It passes through 111 villages of Gorakhpur, Kushinagar and Deoria districts of Uttar Pradesh.

- Deoria district
- Kushinagar, Kushinagar district

==== Bihar ====
The expressway will pass through the following districts along with their cities: It passes through 111 villages of Gorakhpur, Kushinagar and Deoria districts of Uttar Pradesh.

- Gopalganj district
- Bettiah, West Champaran district
- Motihari, East Champaran district
- Sheohar, Sheohar district
- Sitamarhi, Sitamarhi district
- Darbhanga district
- Madhubani, Madhubani district
- Supaul district
- Forbesganj, Araria district
- Araria district (continuation, will not pass through the city of Araria)
- Kishanganj district

==== West Bengal ====
The expressway will terminate again at NH-27 at Siliguri, Darjeeling district, and will pass through the following district along with its city before terminating:

- Islampur, Uttar Dinajpur district

=== Spurs ===
Spurs to the following district headquarters are included in the scope of the main project:

- Uttar Pradesh
  - Deoria
- Bihar
  - Bettiah
  - Motihari
  - Darbhanga
  - Madhubani

=== Planned extensions ===
Planned future extensions include the following:

- Siliguri-Guwahati Expressway to Assam's capital Guwahati.

== Inter-connectivity ==
- Gorakhpur: Bareilly-Gorakhpur Expressway,
  which in turn connects to the Bareilly–Ludhiana Economic Corridor Expressway (includes Ambala-Shamli Expressway.
- Muzaffarpur district: Haldia–Raxaul Expressway.

== Benefits ==
The expressway will benefit Eastern and Northeast India as well as Nepal by many ways, as follows:

- Connectivity: The expressway will not only create a direct route from Gorakhpur to Northeast India, but will also connect the northeast region, along with the eastern half of Nepal, directly with the rest of India, through other expressways. For example, the connection with the national capital directly from Guwahati and Kathmandu will be created with the help of Gorakhpur–Shamli Expressway, and with the financial capital with the help of Delhi–Mumbai Expressway. This network will ensure faster, safer and better commute between the northeast region as well as Nepal.
- Travel time and distance reduction: This expressway will reduce both travel time and distance between Gorakhpu and Siliguri, from 14-15 hours only 8-9 hours, and from 640 km (400 mi) to 519 km (322 mi).
- Trade: The expressway will help to boost trade by faster transportation of cargo between Eastern and North Eastern India, as well as Nepal, while boosting he economy of 3 states of India it passes through - Uttar Pradesh, Bihar and West Bengal - and boost neighbouring Nepal's economy. In the future it will be extended to Guwahati, resulting in growth in exports and reduced dependency on imports to and from North East India.
- Tourism: As this expressway will create a direct link from mainland India to Northeast India, it will result in a boost in tourist arrivals to northeast, as it is well known for its geography and environment. The rise in tourist arrivals will mark the growth and development of all dotted tourist attractions and destinations, including larger ones, all over the northeast region. It will also help Nepal in this respect, as it will create greater and faster accessibility, due to its proximity near the India–Nepal border.
- Employment: Due to increase in industrial activities along the expressway's route, various agricultural and industrial initiatives will help the states' economies and growth, along with Nepal. The establishment of these numerous centres will result in multiple job possibilities for thousands of people living in both the states and the neighbouring country.
- Protection of the Environment: To protect the green cover, plants and trees will be planted in between and both sides along the entire route of the expressway.

== Status updates ==
For the entire Bareilly–Ludhiana Economic Corridor please click here. Current status of "Gorakhpur–Siliguri Expressway" section of "Bareilly–Ludhiana Economic Corridor" is as follows:

- 2022 Mar: Land acquisition began for the project.
- 2023 Jan: The National Highways Authority of India (NHAI) invited tenders for the project.
- 2025 Mar: Target completion date is 2028.
- 2026 May: Land acquisition almost complete, bids are being actively vetted to award packages, and target completion date is 2028.

== See also ==
- Expressways in Bihar
- Expressways in Chhattisgarh
- Expressways of India
- National Highway 27 (East-West Corridor) (NH-27)
- India–Nepal border
