= Kirat Singh (politician) =

Indian politician

Uttar Pradesh Legislative Assembly
- In office 2019–2022
- Constituency: Gangoh

Uttar Pradesh Legislative Assembly
- Incumbent
- Assumed office March 2022
- Constituency: Gangoh

Personal details
- Party: Bharatiya Janata Party

Kirat Singh is an Indian politician. He was elected to the Uttar Pradesh Legislative Assembly from Gangoh in the 2019 by election and 2022 Uttar Pradesh Legislative Assembly election as a member of the Bharatiya Janata Party.
