= National Highway 307 (India) =

National highway in India

National Highway 307
- Map of National Highway 307 in red

Route information
- Length: 46 km (29 mi)

Major junctions
- From: Dehradun, Uttarakhand
- To: Saharanpur, Uttar Pradesh

Location
- Country: India
- States: Uttarakhand: 15 km (9.3 mi); Uttar Pradesh: 30 km (19 mi)
- Primary destinations: Dehradun - Biharigarh - " ChutmalpurSaharanpur

Highway system
- Roads in India; Expressways; National; State; Asian
← NH 7	→ NH 344

National Highway 307 (NH 307) is a short National Highway in Northern India. This 46-kilometre-long (29 mi) highway links Dehradun in Uttarakhand with Saharanpur on NH 344 in Uttar Pradesh. It is a part of the Delhi-Dehradun Expressway.

== See also ==
- List of national highways in India
- National Highways Development Project
