= Iqra Choudhary =

Indian politician (born 1994)

Member of Parliament, Lok Sabha
- Incumbent
- Assumed office 24 June 2024
- Preceded by: Pradeep Kumar Choudhary
- Constituency: Kairana

Personal details
- Born: 26 August 1994 (age 32) Kairana, Uttar Pradesh, India
- Party: Samajwadi Party
- Relations: Nahid Hasan (brother)
- Parents: Chaudhary Munawwar Hasan (father); Begum Tabassum Hasan (mother)
- Education: Master of Science; SOAS University of London; Lady Shri Ram College
- Occupation: Politician

Iqra Choudhary or Iqra Hasan (born 26 August 1994; Hindi pronunciation: [ɪkɾaː t͡ʃɔːd̪ʱ.ɾiː], also [ɪqɾaː]) is an Indian politician. She is the member of Lok Sabha from Kairana Lok Sabha constituency since 4 June 2024. She is a member of the Samajwadi Party.

== Early life and education ==
Iqra is the daughter of Chaudhary Munawwar Hasan, a former Member of the Lok Sabha as well as the Rajya Sabha, and Begum Tabassum Hasan, a former Member of the Lok Sabha born on 26 August 1994 in Kairana, Uttar Pradesh, India. She belongs to a Muslim Gujjar family.

She completed her schooling at Queen Mary School in New Delhi and earned a Bachelor of Arts degree from Lady Shri Ram College, Delhi University. She later completed her MSc International Politics & Law from SOAS University of London in 2020.

== Political career ==
Iqra comes from a political family, with her grandfather Akhtar Hasan, father Munawwar Hasan and mother Tabassum Hasan being former MPs from Kairana. Her brother Nahid Hasan has been a three time Member of Legislative Assembly. She started her political career in 2016, contesting in the Zila Panchayat elections and losing by 5000 votes.

She started an election campaign for her brother Nahid Hasan who was jailed in some cases. She led the campaign and marked his brother as a winning candidate from Kairana Assembly constituency.

During the 2024 General Election, Iqra defeated Pradeep Kumar of the Bharatiya Janata Party by a margin of 69,116 votes to become a Member of Parliament from Kairana.

During the discussion on the Ministry of Education's budget, she criticised the budget for discriminating against minority education. She also expressed concerns about the closure of the Maulana Azad Foundation and the removal of important historical and scientific content from textbooks, including Darwin's theory and the distortion of Mughal history.

== See also ==
- Samajwadi Party
- 2024 Indian general election
- Kairana Lok Sabha constituency
