= Abdul Warish Khan =

Indian politician

Uttar Pradesh Legislative Assembly
- In office May 2007 – March 2012
- Preceded by: Kiran Pal
- Succeeded by: Suresh Rana
- Constituency: Thana Bhawan

Personal details
- Born: 1981 (age 44–45)
- Party: Rashtriya Lok Dal
- Other political affiliations: Bahujan Samaj Party
- Parent: Rao Rafey Khan (father)

Abdul Warish Khan (born 1981) also known as Rao Abdul Waris is an Indian politician and member of the Uttar Pradesh Legislative Assembly representing Thana Bhawan Assembly constituency since May 2007 to March 2012. He won being affiliated with the Rashtriya Lok Dal.

== Career ==
Khan was elected to the Uttar Pradesh Legislative Assembly from the Thana Bhawan Assembly constituency representing the Rashtriya Lok Dal at the only age of 25 in 2007 Uttar Pradesh Legislative Assembly election. He served the term and joined Bahujan Samaj Party in 2011. He fought 2012 election as the candidate of BSP and lost to Suresh Rana and stood third in the result.

He again fought 2017 election representing the BSP and again lost to Suresh Rana being second in the result.

He joined Rashtriya Lok Dal in 2021 after quitting Indian National Congress, but didn’t fought any elections.
