= Jhinjhana =

- Town
- Location in Uttar Pradesh, India
- Coordinates: 29.52°N 77.22°E
- Country: India
- State: Uttar Pradesh
- District: Shamli
- Elevation: 243 m (797 ft)

Population (2011)
  - Total: 18,740

Languages
  - Official: Hindi
- Time zone: UTC+5:30 (IST)
- PIN: 247773
- Vehicle registration: UP 19
- Website: up.gov.in

Jhinjhana is a town and a nagar panchayat in Shamli district in the Indian state of Uttar Pradesh.

== History ==
Jhinjhana is listed in the Ain-i-Akbari as a pargana under Delhi sarkar, producing a revenue of 1,700,250 dams for the imperial treasury and supplying a force of 300 infantry and 20 cavalry. The presence of the town's Jat Zamindars was also noted at the time.

== Geography ==
Jhinjhana is located at 29.52°N 77.22°E. It has an average elevation of 243 metres (797 feet).

Jhinjhana is a historical palace surrounded by small villages, like Sikenderpur, Laprana, PirKhera, Bidoli, Patani Pratap Pur, Unn, Singra, Kertu, Bina mazra, Gogwan etc. The village folks normally are farmers and grow a lot of Sugar Cane, Wheat, Rice, Vegetables and Mangoes. Jhinjhana is near UP and Haryana State border. Jhinjhana Police Station is largest in Shamli District. and located within boundaries of an old fort. Jhinjhana is one of the India Towns located at latitude and longitude of 29° 31' 0" N / 77° 13' 0" E.

JHINJHANA to Karnal ::- 28 KM (about 32 mins.), Panipat ::- 40 KM (about 50 mins.), Muzaffarnagar ::- 50 KM (about 49 mins.), Meerut ::- 75 KM (about 01 hour 15 mins.), Saharanpur ::- 78 KM (about 01 hour 22 mins.), Delhi ::- 102 km (about 02 hour 13 mins.). Shamli ::- 11 KM (about 10 mins.) Kairana ::- 13 KM (20 mins.) Kandhla ::- 23 KM (35 mins.)

=== Colleges, Banquet Hall, Madarsas, and Schools ===
Jhinjhana is a hub of education for rural populations of its surrounding areas. Several Public and Private academic institutions are located at town. Jhinjhana also has an engineering college named Shamli institute of engineering and technology (SIET), a degree college Upadhyay Nayan Sagar jain degree college, and some private intermediate schools like St.RC. Convent school, De saint public school, Nehru Shishu Niketan Public school, SDS convent school, DAV Public school, saint Asha ram inter college, Silver bells public school and two government colleges likely RSS inter college, Jai Sita Ram inter college. Jhinjhana have two institutions of Urdu and Arabic education named Madarsa Allah Diya, Madarsa Noor Muhammadiya. Jhinjhana have many small Madarsas also, taking care by different Mosques.

=== Hospitals ===
It has a government hospital and few small private clinics but still lack of qualified physicians. There is no single qualified doctor(M.B.B.S OR MD)available on approximately fifty thousands of people of town. A large number peoples of town and its surrounded village facing health problems throughout whole year. It has also Aayushmann hospital on karna road opens for 24 hours

=== Banks ===
State Bank Of India. Punjab National Bank. Cooperative Bank. Bhoomi Vikas Bank

=== Religious places ===
Many religious places are here like prachin shiv mandir near Anuj Gupta House Ram Shyam Durga Mandir, Neela Roza Mosque, Dargah Imam sahab, Shah Mubarik Mosque, Arya Samaj mandir, Kali Mandir, Panchmukhi mandir, Mohan Johad, Shakumbari mata mandir,

== Demographics ==
As of 2011 India census, Jhinjhana had a population of 18,740. Males constitute 52.44% of the population and females 47.55%. Jhinjhana has an average literacy rate of 68.23%, lower than the national average of 74.04%: male literacy is 75.38%, and female literacy is 60.45%. In Jhinjhana, 15.52% of the population is under 6 years of age.
