= Ashraf Ali Khan (politician, born 1972) =

Indian politician

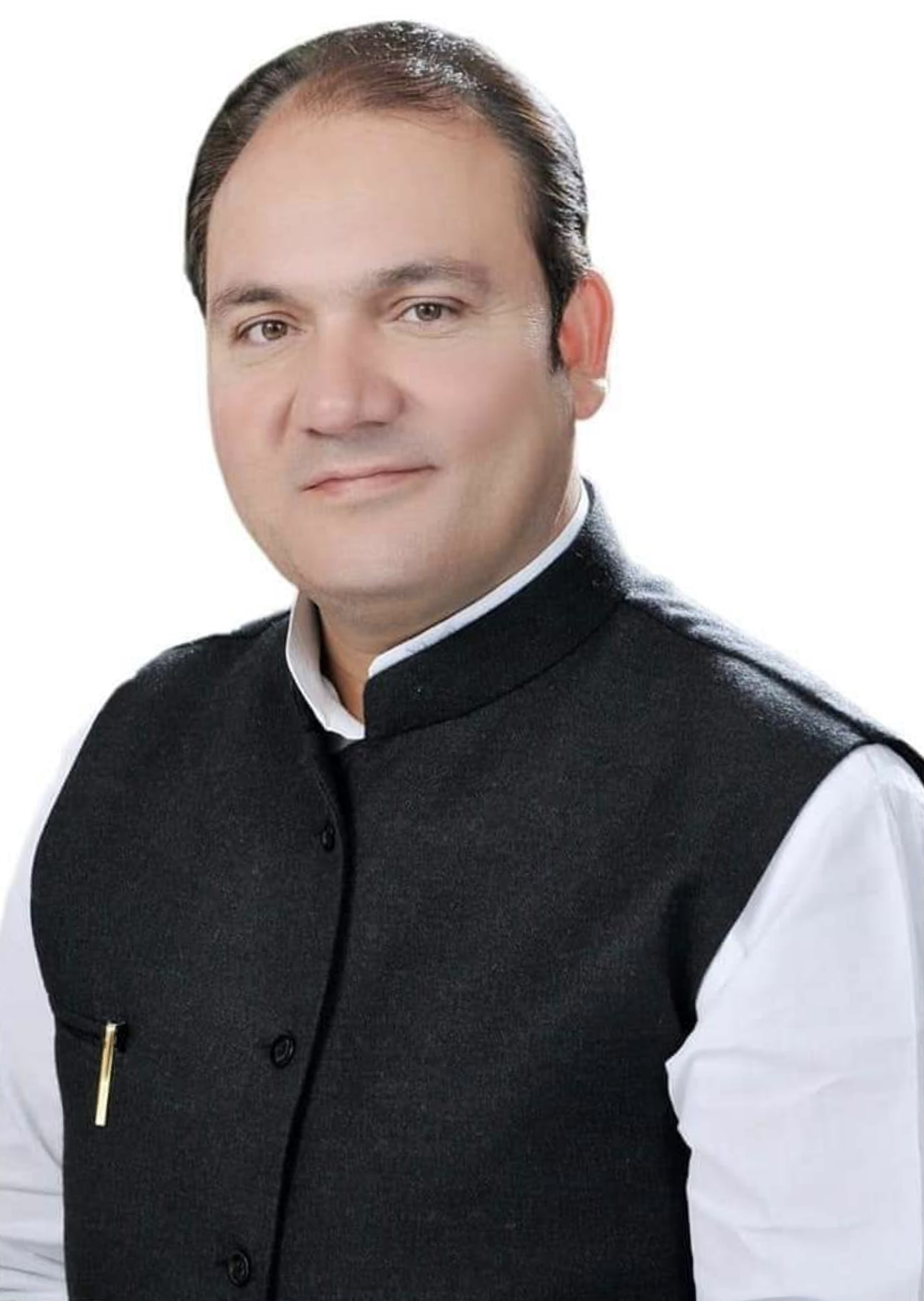

Member of the Uttar Pradesh legislative assembly
- Incumbent
- Assumed office 10 March 2022
- Preceded by: Suresh Rana
- Constituency: Thana Bhawan

Personal details
- Born: 18 August 1972 (age 54) Jalalabad, shamli district
- Party: Rashtriya Lok Dal
- Spouse: Rama Ashraf
- Children: Shayan Ali Khan, Ayan Ali Khan
- Parent(s): Shaukat Ali Khan (father), Firasat Jahan (mother).
- Occupation: Agriculturist, Politician

Ashraf Ali Khan is an Indian Politician and a member of Uttar Pradesh Legislative Assembly from Thana Bhawan representing Rashtriya Lok Dal since March 2022.
