= Harpal Singh Panwar =

Indian politician

Harpal Panwar
- Born: 01 June 1945 (age 81); Shamli District, Uttar Pradesh
- Occupation: Politician

Harpal Panwar (born 1 June 1945) is an Indian politician. He was born in the village of Nala in the Shamli District. He was a Member of Indian Parliament (specifically Lok Sabha, from Kairana (Lok Sabha constituency)) for two terms in 1989 and 1991.Harpal Panwar was appointed vice-chairman of the Council for Advancement of People's Action & Rural Technology (CAPART), Ministry of Rural Development with a status of Minister of State, Government of India in 1996.

He worked closely with the Former Prime Minister Chaudhary Charan Singh. He is a well known leader of western Uttar Pradesh, where he has been involved in various movements of farmers.

From 1983 he has hold several positions in Lok Dal and later Janta Dal at the national level. Later he joined the Congress party and was Member, AICC several times. He has held several organizational positions in Congress Party at state and national level.

Harpal Panwar joined the BJP in the presence of Sh. J.P.Nadda, just before the general elections of 2014.
