= Anuradha Choudhary =

Indian politician (born 1960)

Honorable Anuradha Choudhary

Member of Uttar Pradesh Legislative Assembly
- In office 2002–2004
- Preceded by: Pradeep Baliyan
- Succeeded by: Paramjeet Malik
- Constituency: Baghra

Minister of Public Works Department in Uttar Pradesh state
- In office 2002–2004

Member of 14th Lok Sabha
- In office 2004–2009
- Preceded by: Amir Alam Khan
- Succeeded by: Begum Tabassum Hasan
- Constituency: Kairana

Personal details
- Born: 29 August 1960 (age 66)
- Party: Bharatiya Janata Party

Anuradha Choudhary (born 29 August 1960) is a politician in Uttar Pradesh, India. She has been a minister in Uttar Pradesh, and also a member of Lok Sabha. She started her career with Ajit Singh's Rashtriya Lok Dal, joined Samajwadi Party in 2012 and joined Bharatiya Janata Party in 2015 and after joining BJP she ended up her image as well as political career completely. She is daughter of war veteran Brigadier Atma Singh Sejwal of Lado Sarai Village in Delhi near Mehrauli and Sarla Ahlawat was from Gochhi, Beri. Atma Singh was from Kumaon Regiment of Indian Army. He was Founding father of Indian Army’s 17 Kumaon Regiment. Kiran Choudhry is her sister, Kiran is MLA, Minister & Rajya Sabha MP from Haryana, she was also MLA & Deputy Speaker in Delhi. Kiran's husband was Surinder Legha MLA, Minister & MP, son of Bansi Lal CM Haryana & Defence Minister of India. Anuradha is married to Aditya Rohil from Shamli district on Panipat border.

== Political life ==
In 2002 she was elected as the M.L.A. from Baghra and became the PWD minister in the state of Uttar Pradesh. In 2004 she was elected as the MP for Kairana on a Rashtriya Lok Dal ticket. She lost 2009 Lok Sabha election from Muzaffarnagar.

In January 2012 before the Uttar Pradesh Legislative Assembly elections, Anuradha quit the Rashtriya Lok Dal to join Samajwadi Party and was appointed the national general secretary of the party. She was stripped of the status of minister in UP after the party's big defeat in Lok Sabha polls in May 2014, whereupon she quit the party.

In January 2015, she joined the Bharatiya Janata Partyand after that she ended up her image as well as political career completely.
