= Kertu =

Coordinates: 29°34′09″N 77°09′15″E

Kertu is a village located in Shamli in Uttar Pradesh, India. It is situated on the border of Uttar Pradesh along State Highway 82, equidistant from Shamli and Kamal, each approximately 20 km away. The population exceeds 5,000, with the predominant religions being Hinduism, Islam, and Sikhism. The main castes include Brahmins, Muslims, Gujjars, and Jats. It has a bank named Allahabad Bank, a super specialty government hospital, and a society for seeds.

== Development and infrastructure ==
Shamli, the main city of the district, has the Yamnotri Expressway, a four-lane highway, which links Delhi to the Uttarkashi District. National Highway 1, a six-lane expressway linking Delhi to the Amritsar-Attari border in Punjab, passes through Karnal. The Karnal-Meerut Highway passes through Kertu.
