= Ambala-Shamli Expressway =

Road in India

Ambala Shamli Expressway

Route information
- Maintained by National Highways Authority of India (NHAI)
- Length: 121 km (75 mi)
- Existed: December 2024 (expected)–present

Major junctions
- West end: Sadopur, Ambala district, Haryana
- East end: Gogwan Jalalpur (Interchange with Delhi Dehradun expressway), Shamli district, Uttar Pradesh

Location
- Country: India
- States: Uttar Pradesh, Haryana, Punjab

Highway system
- Roads in India; Expressways; National; State; Asian

The Ambala Shamli Expressway, part of larger 450-kilometre-long (280 mi) six-lane Bareilly–Ludhiana Economic Corridor (Bareilly-Ludhiana Expressway), is an under construction 6-lane access-controlled 121.786-kilometre-long (75.674 mi) expressway in the Indian states of Haryana, Punjab and Uttar Pradesh. It is expected to be completed by December 2026

== Bareilly–Ludhiana Economic Corridor ==
Bareilly–Ludhiana Economic Expressway is partially access-controlled, partially greenfield & rest upgrade of brownfield highway with following three sections:

- "NH 44 Ambala-Ludhiana Highway", 90-kilometre (56 mi) brownfield upgrade:
- "Ambala-Shamli Expressway" (Sadopur-Gogwan Jalalpur Expressway), 121.78-kilometre (75.67 mi) greenfield:
- "Shamli-Bareilly Expressway", 220-kilometre (140 mi) greenfield:

The extension of Bareilly–Ludhiana Economic Expressway is Bareilly-Gorakhpur Expressway, which will connect with Siliguri–Gorakhpur Expressway.

== Construction ==
Construction contractors for 3 packages are as follows:

Sr No.	Package	Length in Km	Contractor
1.	Gogwan Jalapur (Shamli District) - Dala Mazra (Shamli District)	45.5	Rajshayama Construction LTD.
2.	Dala Mazra (Shamli District) - Shahbad (Haryana)	39.5	APCO Infratech
3.	Shahbad (Haryana) - Sadopur (Ambala District, Haryana)	36.5	Montecarlo Ltd

== Route ==
=== Route length by states ===
State	Length in Km
Haryana	75
Uttar Pardesh	45

=== Detailed route ===
Ambala-Shamli Expressway will connect Saharanpur and Shamli districts of West UP via Ambala, Kurukshetra, Karnal and Yamunanagar districts of Haryana state. This expressway start at Sadopur village of Ambala District and end at Gogwan Jalalpur in Shamli District where it connects to the Delhi-Dehradun Expressway. Its route is as follows:

- Haryana
  - Ambala city:
    - Sadopur in north of Ambala,
    - Then runs as the northern and eastern bypass for Ambala city (via Panjokhra) of Ambala,
  - Saha: as Southwestern bypass of Saha.
  - Barara: as southwestern bypass of Barara (with additional spur from Barara to NH 344 by upgrading HR-SH4),
  - Radaur: as the western bypass of Radaur (east of Ladwa and Kurukshetra).
  - Chandro (bridge on yamuna).
- Uttar Pradesh
  - Gangoh: as eastern bypass of Gangoh.
  - Gogwan Jalalpur on Delhi-Saharanpur-Dehradun Expressway: just east of Thanabhawan in Shamli district.

== Interconnectivity ==
Ambala-Shamli Expressway interconnects with the following:

- Ambala–Chandigarh Expressway at Ambala
- Delhi–Dehradun Expressway at Gogwan Jalalpur (northeast of Shamli)
- Panipat-Gokarhpur Expressway via Delhi–Dehradun Expressway

== Current status ==
The current status of Siliguri-Bareilly–Ludhiana Economic Corridor/Expressway is subdivided into the following 4 sections.

=== Ludhiana-Ambala section ===
- Existing AH1, which connects to Delhi–Amritsar–Katra Expressway near Ludhiana.

=== Ambala-Shamli Expressway ===
- 2022 Jan: Tenders invited for all 3 packages.
- 2024 Nov: 40% work complete in Shamli district.
- 2026 Jan: Heavy construction on all packages is progressing, approach roads, overbridge and road laying work is underway. According to NHAI officials the official inauguration window is shifted to December 2026, with Uttar Pradesh section to be ready by June 2026 and Haryana section by December 2026.

=== Shamli-Gorakhpur Expressway ===
- 2026 May: Land acquisition commenced, land has been identified and physically marked for the 742 km long and 150 meter wide 6-lane (extendable to 8) passing through 22 districts and 37 tehsils of Uttar Pradesh, physical construction will commence in 2026-2027. Tender with 11 packages will open in late 2026, awarded in early 2027. It will cut Delhi NCR to Nepal (Sonauli border) travel time from 20 hours (via Yamuna Expressway, Agra-Lucknow Expressway and Gorakhpur) to just 8 hours. Target completion date is end of 2030.

=== Gorakhpur–Siliguri Expressway ===
- For the latest status, click here.

== See also ==
- Expressways in Haryana
- Expressways in Uttar Pradesh
- Expressways of India
