= Choudhary Virender Singh =

Indian politician

Member of the Uttar Pradesh Legislative Council
- Incumbent
- Assumed office 2021
- Constituency: Nominated By Governor
- In office 2015–2021
- Constituency: elected by Legislative Assembly members

Cabinet Minister Government of Uttar Pradesh
- In office 2003–2007
- Chief Minister: Mulayam Singh Yadav
- Ministry & Department's: Culture

Member of the Uttar Pradesh Legislative Assembly
- In office 1996–2007
- Preceded by: Ratan Pal Panwar
- Succeeded by: Balveer Singh
- Constituency: Kandhla
- In office 1980–1992
- Preceded by: Ajab Singh
- Succeeded by: Ratan Pal Panwar
- Constituency: Kandhla

Personal details
- Born: July 2, 1952 (age 74) Jasala, Shamli, Uttar Pradesh, India
- Party: Bharatiya Janata Party
- Other political affiliations: Samajwadi Party; Rashtriya Lok Dal; Bharatiya Kisan Kamgar Party; Janata Dal; Lokdal; Janata Party (Secular)
- Relations: Justice B. S. Chauhan, Dr. Yashvir Singh (sibling)
- Education: Chaudhary Charan Singh University (CCS University), Meerut
- Occupation: Politician

Choudhary Virender Singh is an Indian politician. He belongs to the Bharatiya Janata Party. He is a member of the Uttar Pradesh Legislative Council. He has also served as a Cabinet Minister in Uttar Pradesh government. He had represented Kandhla (now delimited) constituency for six terms(1980–85, 1985–89, 1989–1991, 1991–1992, 1996–2002, 2002–2007). He has also served as Chairman of UP Sugarcane Seed Development Corporation. At present, he is serving his second term in Uttar Pradesh Legislative Council.
