= Kairana Assembly constituency =

Constituency of the Uttar Pradesh legislative assembly in India

Kairana
- Constituency No. 8 for the Uttar Pradesh Legislative Assembly
- MLA Nahid Hasan

Constituency details
- Country: India
- Region: North India
- State: Uttar Pradesh
- District: Shamli district
- Total electors: 300,659 (2017)
- Reservation: None

Member of Legislative Assembly
- 18th Uttar Pradesh Legislative Assembly
- Incumbent Nahid Hasan
- Party: Samajwadi Party
- Elected year: 2017

Kairana Assembly constituency is one of the 403 constituencies of the Uttar Pradesh Legislative Assembly, India. It is a part of the Shamli district (prior to 2012, Kairana was a tehsil of Muzaffarnagar district) and one of the five assembly constituencies in the Kairana Lok Sabha constituency. Kairana Assembly constituency came into existence in 1955 as a result of the "Final Order DC (1953-1955)". The extant and serial number of this constituency was last defined in "Delimitation of Parliamentary and Assembly Constituencies Order, 2008".

== Wards / areas ==
Kairana assembly constituency comprises Ailum, Gagor, Un, Chausana-1, Chausana-2, Toda, Khodsama, Shamli-Shamla, Ballamajara, Bajheri, Kera Bhau, Nai Nangla, Dathera, Baheda, Sakoti, Udpur, Machhrauli, Lawa Daudpur of Un KC, Jhinjhana KC, PCs Kairana 1 & 4, Kairana 2, Kairana 3, Mohammadpur Rai, Ramra, Panjeeth, Mamaur, Teetarvada, Unchagaon, Airati, Kandela, Dundookheda, Issopur of Kairana KC, Un NP, Jhinjhana NP & Kairana NPP of Kairana Tehsil.

== Members of the Legislative Assembly ==
Year	Member	Party
1957	Munawwar Hasan	Indian National Congress
1962	Munawwar Hasan	Independent
1967	Munawwar Hasan	Indian National Congress
1969	Munawwar Hasan	Bharatiya Kranti Dal
1974	Munawwar Hasan	Indian National Congress
1977	Munawwar Hasan	Janata Party
1980	Munawwar Hasan	Janata Party (Secular)
1985	Munawwar Hasan	Indian National Congress
1989	Munawwar Hasan	Independent
1991	Munawwar Hasan	Janata Dal
1993	Munawwar Hasan	Janata Dal
1996	Munawwar Hasan	Bharatiya Janata Party
2002	Munawwar Hasan	Bharatiya Janata Party
2007	Munawwar Hasan	Bharatiya Janata Party
2012	Munawwar Hasan	Bharatiya Janata Party
2014^	Nahid Hasan	Samajwadi Party
2017	Nahid Hasan	Samajwadi Party
2022	Nahid Hasan	Samajwadi Party

== Election results ==
=== 2027 ===
2027 Uttar Pradesh Legislative Assembly election: Kairana
Party	Candidate	Votes	%	±%
INDIA				
NDA				
BSP				
AIMIM	None of the above			
Majority				
Turnout				
gain from		Swing		

=== 2022 ===
2022 Uttar Pradesh Legislative Assembly election: Kairana
Party	Candidate	Votes	%	±%
SP	Nahid Hasan	131,035	54.16	▲6.9
BJP	Mriganka Singh	105,148	43.46	▲6.32
NOTA	None of the above	593	0.25	▼0.26
Majority		25,887	10.7	▲0.58
Turnout		241,947	75.04	▲5.48
SP hold		Swing		

=== 2017 ===
17th Vidhan Sabha: 2017 Assembly Elections.

2017 Uttar Pradesh Legislative Assembly election: Kairana
Party	Candidate	Votes	%	±%
SP	Nahid Hasan	98,830	47.26	
BJP	Mriganka Singh	77,668	37.14	
RLD	Anil Chauhan	19,992	9.56	
BSP	Diwakar Deshwal	6,888	3.29	
NOTA	None of the above	1,060	0.51	
Majority		21,162	10.12	
Turnout		209,134	69.56	
SP hold		Swing		

=== 2014 ===
By-Election, 2014: Kairana
Party	Candidate	Votes	%	±%
SP	Nahid Hasan	83,984		
BJP	Anil Chauhan	82,885		
INC	Arshad Hasan	16,906		
Majority		1,099		
Turnout				
SP gain from BJP		Swing		

=== 2012 ===
16th Vidhan Sabha: 2012 General Elections.

2012 Uttar Pradesh Legislative Assembly election: Kairana
Party	Candidate	Votes	%	±%
BJP	Munawwar Hasan	80,293	45.17	+6.73
BSP	Anwar Hasan	60,750	34.17	+18.84
SP	Ayyub Jang	21,267	11.96	+3.9
	Remainder nine candidates	15,457	8.69	−
Majority		19,543	10.99	−
Turnout		1,77,771	66.03	+14.97
BJP hold		Swing	-	

=== 2007 ===
2007 Uttar Pradesh Legislative Assembly election: Kairana
Party	Candidate	Votes	%	±%
BJP	Munawwar Hasan	53,483	38.44	
RLD	Arshad Hasan	44,893	32.37	
BSP	Devpal Singh Kashyap	21,330	15.33	
SP	Vijay Malik	11,217	8.06	
INC	Shamim Ahmad	2,456	1.76	
Majority		8,590	6.17	
Turnout		1,39,106	51.06	
BJP hold		Swing	–	

== See also ==
- Shamli district
- Kairana Lok Sabha constituency
- Government of Uttar Pradesh
- List of Vidhan Sabha constituencies of Uttar Pradesh
- Uttar Pradesh
- Uttar Pradesh Legislative Assembly
