= Gangoh Assembly constituency =

Constituency of the Uttar Pradesh legislative assembly in India

Gangoh
- Constituency No. 7 for the Uttar Pradesh Legislative Assembly

Constituency details
- Country: India
- Region: North India
- State: Uttar Pradesh
- District: Saharanpur
- Total electors: 3,25,432 (2017)
- Reservation: None

Member of Legislative Assembly
- 18th Uttar Pradesh Legislative Assembly
- Incumbent Kirat Singh Gurjar
- Party: Bharatiya Janata Party
- Elected year: 2017

Gangoh Assembly constituency is one of the 403 constituencies of the Uttar Pradesh Legislative Assembly, India. It is a part of the Saharanpur district and one of the five assembly constituencies in the Kairana Lok Sabha constituency. First assembly election in this assembly constituency was conducted in 2012 after the constituency came into existence in the year 2008 as a result of the "Delimitation of Parliamentary and Assembly Constituencies Order, 2008".

== Wards / Areas ==
Extent of Gangoh Assembly is Ambehta, Gangoh, Ambehta NP, Titron NP & Gangoh NPP of Nakur Tehsil; Nanauta & Nanauta NP of Deoband Tehsil in Saharanpur district.

== Members of the Legislative Assembly ==
Year	Member	Party
Till 2012 : Constituency did not exist
2012	Pradeep Choudhary	Indian National Congress
2017	Pradeep Choudhary	Bharatiya Janata Party
2019^	Kirat Singh Gurjar	Bharatiya Janata Party
2022	Kirat Singh Gurjar	Bharatiya Janata Party

== Election results ==
=== 2027 ===
2027 Uttar Pradesh Legislative Assembly election: Gangoh
Party	Candidate	Votes	%	±%
INDIA				
NDA				
BSP				
NOTA	None of the above			
Majority				
Turnout				
gain from		Swing		

=== 2022 ===
2022 Uttar Pradesh Legislative Assembly election: Gangoh
Party	Candidate	Votes	%	±%
BJP	Kirat Singh	116,582	43.08	+4.44
SP	Chaudhary Indersain	93,133	34.42	+16.07
BSP	Noman Masood	57,695	21.32	+3.95
NOTA	None of the above	604	0.22	−0.16
Majority		23,449	8.66	−6.12
Turnout		270,590	70.07	−1.91
BJP hold		Swing		

=== 2019 ===
By-Election, 2019: Gangoh
Party	Candidate	Votes	%	±%
BJP	Kirat Singh	68,300	30.51	−8.27
INC	Nauman Masood	62,881	28.09	−4.14
SP	Chaudhary Indersain	57,374	25.63	+7.21
BSP	Mohammed Irshad	32,276	14.41	−3.03
None of the Above	NOTA	730	0.32	
Majority		5,419	2.41	
Turnout		2,24,598	60.69	−11.32
BJP hold		Swing		

=== 2017 ===
2017 Assembly Elections: Gangoh
Party	Candidate	Votes	%	±%
BJP	Pradeep Choudhary	99,446	38.64	
INC	Nauman Masood	61,418	23.86	
SP	Chaudhary Indersain	47,219	18.35	
BSP	Mahipal Singh Majra	44,717	17.37	
NOTA	None of the above	971	0.38	
Majority		38,028	14.78	
Turnout		257,378	71.98	
BJP gain from INC		Swing	+22.08	

=== 2012 ===
2012 Assembly Elections: Gangoh
Party	Candidate	Votes	%	±%
INC	Pradeep Choudhary	65,149	28.44	
SP	Chaudhary Rudersain	61,126	26.68	
BSP	Shagufta Khan	41,110	17.95	
Independent	Nahid Hasan	33,288	14.53	
BJP	Shashi Bala Pundir	15,357	6.70	
	Remaining 9 candidates	13,051	5.07	
Majority		4,023	1.75	
Turnout		2,29,081	72.21	
INC hold		Swing		

== See also ==
- Saharanpur district
- Kairana (Lok Sabha c inonstituency)
- Government of Uttar Pradesh
- List of Vidhan Sabha constituencies of Uttar Pradesh
- Uttar Pradesh
- Uttar Pradesh Legislative Assembly
- Kirat Singh Gurjar
