= Un, Uttar Pradesh =

Un
- Town
- Nickname: Un (Uttar Pradesh)
- Interactive map of Un
- Country: Republic of India
- State: Uttar Pradesh
- District: Shamli
- Elevation: 260 m (850 ft)

Population (2011)
  - Total: 15,124

Languages
  - Official: Hindi, Khariboli
- Time zone: UTC+5:30 (IST)
- Postal code: 247778
- Vehicle registration: UP 19
- Website: www.Shamali.gov.in

Un is a town and a nagar panchayat in Shamli district in the Indian state of Uttar Pradesh.

== Geography ==
Un is located at 29.58°N 77.25°E. It has an average elevation of 240 metres (787 feet).

== Demographics ==
As of the 2011 Census of India, Un had a population of 15,124. Males constitute 55% of the population and females 45%. Un has an average literacy rate of 58%, lower than the national average of 59.5%: male literacy is 69%, and female literacy is 45%. In Un, 15% of the population is under 6 years of age.
