= Holmes Institute =

Australian provider of higher education courses

Holmes Institute and Holmes College is an Australian provider of higher education courses. It is privately owned with campuses in Melbourne, Sydney, Brisbane, Gold Coast, Cairns, Dublin, London and Toronto.

Holmes Institute was established in 1963 as a commercial college in Melbourne. It was previously known as Holmes College of Management or simply Holmes College, with its International and Australian head office in Spring street, Melbourne. As of 2009, it was Australia's largest national private education and training centre and by 2021 its MBA's was Australia's largest according to enrollment.
