= Begum Tabassum Hasan =

Indian politician

Tabassum Hasan

Member of Parliament, Lok Sabha
- In office 31 May 2018 – 23 May 2019
- Preceded by: Hukum Singh
- Succeeded by: Pradeep Choudhary
- Constituency: Kairana
- In office 16 May 2009 – 16 May 2014
- Preceded by: Anuradha Choudhary
- Succeeded by: Hukum Singh
- Constituency: Kairana

Personal details
- Born: 25 December 1970 (age 55) Dumjhera, Saharanpur
- Party: Samajwadi Party
- Spouse: Chaudhary Munawwar Hasan
- Children: Nahid Hasan and Iqra Choudhary
- Website: https://instagram.com/chaudharyhasan.786/

Tabassum Hasan (born 1970) is a Samajwadi Party political activist, former Member of Parliament, Lok Sabha from the Kairana Lok Sabha Constituency in Uttar Pradesh, and wife of former MP late Chaudhary Munawwar Hasan. She has been with Bahujan Samaj Party, Ajit Singh's Rashtriya Lok Dal, and Samajwadi Party.

== Life ==
Tabassum Hasan husband Chaudhary Munawwar Hasan was elected to Lok Sabha in 2004 but died in an accident in 2008. She was first elected to Lok Sabha in 2009 as a Bahujan Samaj Party candidate. She won By-Election from Kairana Lok Sabha seat in 2018 after seat vacated due to death of sitting MP Hukum Singh. She lost the seat in 2019.

== Political career ==
She was first elected to Lok Sabha in 2009 as a Bahujan Samaj Party candidate from Kairana. Her son Nahid Hasan lost 2014 Lok Sabha poll from Kairana as a Samajwadi Party candidate. In the 2018 bypoll for Kairana, she won by a margin of nearly 50,000 votes as a Rashtriya Lok Dal candidate supported by a "grand coalition" of Indian National Congress, Samajwadi Party and Bahujan Samaj Party. However, she joined Samajwadi Party and lost the Kairana seat, a year later, to BJP's Pradeep Choudhary, by a margin of over 90,000 votes, in 2019 Lok Sabha Elections.

== Positions held ==
Year	Description
2009	Elected to 15th Lok Sabha
31 Aug. 2009	Member, Committee on Health & Family Welfare; Member, Consultative Committee, Ministry of Social Justice and Empowerment
15 Oct. 2009	Member, Committee on Food Management in Parliament House Complex; Member, U.P. Sunni Central Waqf Board
2017 - 31 May 2018	Member, Zila Panchayat, Shamli
31 May 2018 - 23 May 2019	Elected to 16th Lok Sabha in a by-election (2nd Term): Member, Standing Committee on Human Resource Development

Lok Sabha
Preceded by Anuradha Choudhary	Member of Parliament for Kairana; 2009 – 2014	Succeeded by Hukum Singh
Preceded by Hukum Singh	Member of Parliament for Kairana; 2018 – 2019	Succeeded by Pradeep Choudhary
