= Persann Kumar Chaudhary =

Indian politician

Member of the Uttar Pradesh legislative assembly
- Incumbent
- Assumed office 10 March 2022
- Preceded by: Tejendra Nirwal
- Constituency: Shamli

Personal details
- Party: Rashtriya Lok Dal
- Other political affiliations: National Democratic Alliance (2024–present)
- Parent: Braham Singh (father)
- Education: Meerut University

Persann Kumar Chaudhary is an Indian politician from Uttar Pradesh. He is member of Uttar Pradesh Legislative Assembly from Shamli representing Rashtriya Lok Dal.
