= Manav Bharti University =

Private university in Laddo, Solan, India

- Type: Private
- Established: 2008
- Chairman: Raj Kumar Rana
- Vice-Chancellor: D. A. Jain
- Location: Laddo, Solan, Himachal Pradesh, India
- Website: www.manavbhartiuniversity.edu.in

Manav Bharti University is a private university located in the village Laddo near Kumarhatti in Solan district in the Indian state of Himachal Pradesh. Despite claiming to be established under the Himachal Pradesh State Legislature Act and notified under Section 2(f) of the University Grants Commission Act of 1956, as of February 2020 the institution has been rocked by multiple criticism over its issuance of degrees.

== Degree controversy ==
In 2021, the Times of India reported that Manav Bharti had sold many fake degrees over few years to people who did not actually study at the university. In Singapore, two holders of these diplomas were jailed for submitting false qualifications in their work pass applications, while 19 more were permanently banned from the country.
