= Garhi Pukhta =

- Town
- Location in Uttar Pradesh, India
- Coordinates: 29°33′N 77°18′E
- Country: India
- State: Uttar Pradesh
- District: Shamli

Population (2011)
  - Total: 11,748

Languages
  - Official: Hindi
- Time zone: UTC+5:30 (IST)

Garhi Pukhta is a town and a nagar panchayat in Shamli district in the state of Uttar Pradesh, India. As of the 2011 Census of India, Garhi Pukhta had a population of 11,748. Males constitute 53% of the population and females 47%. Garhi Pukhta has an average literacy rate of 49%; male literacy is 58%, and female literacy is 42%.

== Educational institutes ==
- Jawaharlal Nehru College
- Lal bahadur Shastari Junior High School (Bees wala school)
- Adarsh Bal Vidya Mandir

This town has a post office, two banks, a government school, A girl's college, hospitals for both animals and human beings and many private schools.
