= National Highway 709AD (India) =

National highway in India

National Highway 709AD
- Map of National Highway 709AD in red

Route information
- Auxiliary route of NH 9
- Length: 170 km (110 mi)

Major junctions
- West end: Panipat
- Shamli, Muzaffarnagar, Bijnor
- East end: Nagina

Location
- Country: India
- States: Uttar Pradesh
- Primary destinations: Shamli, Muzaffarnagar

Highway system
- Roads in India; Expressways; National; State; Asian
← NH 44	→ NH 734

National Highway 709AD, commonly called Panipat-Khatima Highway is a national highway in India. It is a spur road of National Highway 9. NH-709AD traverses the states of Uttar Pradesh and Haryana passes through various Cities and Town in Haryana and Western Uttar Pradesh like Shamli, Muzaffarnagar, Bijnor in India before its terminal at Nagina in Bijnor. Shamli acts as one of the major junction as two other major highways of the area (709A) and (709B) intersects with (709AD) at Shamli. The other major junction is Muzaffarnagar where this highway intersects with (334) Delhi-Rishikesh National Highway and UP State Highway 59

== Route ==
Panipat - Shamli - Muzaffarnagar - Jansath - Meerapur - Bijnor - Nagina.

== Junctions list ==
NH 44 Terminal near Panipat.
NH 709A near Shamli.
NH 709B near Shamli.
NH 334 near Muzaffarnagar.
NH 34 near Miranpur.
NH 34 near Bijnor.
NH 734 Terminal near Nagina
