= Pradeep Baliyan =

Indian politician

Pradeep Baliyan is an ex-MLA from Baghra constituency of Muzaffarnagar district of Uttar Pradesh.
