= Pradeep Kumar (politician) =

Indian politician

Pradeep Kumar Chaudhary

Member of Parliament, Lok Sabha
- In office May 2019 – June 2024
- Preceded by: Tabassum Hasan
- Succeeded by: Iqra Choudhary
- Constituency: Kairana

MLA, 17th Legislative Assembly
- In office March 2017 – 23 May 2019
- Succeeded by: Kirat Singh
- Constituency: Gangoh

MLA, 16th Legislative Assembly
- In office March 2012 – March 2017
- Preceded by: None
- Succeeded by: Self
- Constituency: Gangoh

MLA, 13th Legislative Assembly
- In office 2000–2002
- Preceded by: Kunwar Pal Singh
- Succeeded by: Sushil Chaudhary
- Constituency: Nakur, Saharanpur district

Personal details
- Born: 10 March 1969 (age 57) Village Dudhla, Gangoh, Uttar Pradesh
- Party: Bhartiya Janata Party (since 2017)
- Other political affiliations: Indian National Congress (2012-2017); Rashtriya Lok Dal (2000–2002); Janata Party (2002–2007); Samajwadi Party (2007–2012)
- Spouse: Sunita Chaudhary (m. 1999)
- Children: Anshuman Choudhary, Arnimesh Chaudhary
- Profession: Agriculturist, politician

Pradeep Kumar Chaudhary is an Indian politician and member of the 13th, 16th and 17th Legislative Assembly of Uttar Pradesh. In 2017 he represented the Gangoh constituency of Uttar Pradesh and is a member of the Bhartiya Janata Party. He is elected as Member of Parliament in 17th Lok sabha from Kairana seat. Pradeep Choudhary's father Late Master Kanwarpal Singh remained for 3 terms MLA. Pradeep Choudhary is also titled with (Vikas Purush).

== Personal life ==
Kumar was born on 10 March 1969 to Kanwar Pal Singh in a Gujjar family of Dudhla village of Gangoh block in Uttar Pradesh. He holds a post-graduate degree. Kumar married Sunita Chaudhary on 19 February 1999, with whom he has two sons. He is an agriculturist by profession.

== Political career ==
Kumar has been an MLA three times. During his first time, he was elected in the by-elections in 2000 at Nakur (Assembly constituency) as a member of Rashtriya Lok Dal. He was then elected to the Sixteenth Legislative Assembly of Uttar Pradesh in 2012 at Gangoh (Assembly constituency) as a member of Indian National Congress, defeating Samajwadi Party candidate Ruder Sen by a margin of 4,023 votes.

He was elected to the Seventeenth Legislative Assembly of Uttar Pradesh in 2017 again at Gangoh (Assembly constituency) as a member of Bhartiya Janata Party, defeating Indian National Congress candidate Nauman Masood by a margin of 38,028 votes. In 2019, he was elected as a member of parliament from Kairana Lok Sabha constituency as a member of the Bharatiya Janata Party.

== Posts held ==
#	From	To	Position	Comments
01	2000	2002	Member, 13th Legislative Assembly	
02	2012	2017	Member, 16th Legislative Assembly	
03	2017	2019	Member, 17th Legislative Assembly	
04	2019	2024	Member, 17th Lok Sabha	

== See also ==
- Gangoh
- Uttar Pradesh Legislative Assembly
- 16th Legislative Assembly of Uttar Pradesh
- 14th Legislative Assembly of Uttar Pradesh
- Politics of India
- Indian National Congress
