= Hukum Singh =

Indian politician (1938–2018)

Member of parliament for Kairana
- In office 16 May 2014 – 3 February 2018
- Preceded by: Begum Tabassum Hasan
- Succeeded by: Begum Tabassum Hasan
- Constituency: Kairana

Personal details
- Born: 5 April 1938 Kairana, United Provinces, British India
- Died: 3 February 2018 (aged 79) Noida, Uttar Pradesh, India
- Party: Bharatiya Janta Party (1995-2018); Indian National Congress (1974-1980) (1985-95) Janata Party (Secular) (1980-85)
- Spouse: Rewati Singh (m. 1958)
- Children: 5
- Education: Allahabad University (LLB)
- Occupation: Politician

Hukum Singh (5 April 1938 – 3 February 2018) was an Indian politician who served as the Member of Parliament from Kairana in Uttar Pradesh as a Bharatiya Janata Party (BJP) candidate. He was a member of the Panel of Chairpersons of the 16th Lok Sabha, and the Chairperson of the Standing Committee on Water Resources.

== Life ==
Singh was born on 5 April 1938 to Maan Singh and Leelavati in Kairana. He received his Bachelor of Arts and LLB degrees from Allahabad University. Singh married Rewati Devi on 13 June 1958, with whom he has five daughters. He was previously elected as a Member of the Uttar Pradesh Legislative Assembly for seven terms (1974–77,1980–89,1996-2014). He has also served as a Cabinet Minister in Uttar Pradesh governments under both BJP and the Congress. He died on 3 February 2018 at a private hospital in Noida, Uttar Pradesh after suffering from severe breathing difficulties for a brief period.

== Education and career ==
A law graduate from Allahabad University, he cleared PCS (J) exams in 1963. But instead of becoming a judicial officer, he joined the Indian Army as a Commissioned Officer after 1962 Indo-China war. He participated in the 1965 Pakistan war as a captain, in the Poonch sector in Kashmir. He then took voluntary retirement in 1969. He entered active politics in 1974, becoming an MLA for the first time on a Congress ticket. He went on to win Assembly elections seven times and held the post of deputy speaker of the Assembly from 1983 to 1985. He won his fourth term, as a BJP candidate, in 1996 and his first Lok Sabha elections in 2014.

== Controversies ==
In September 2013, he was named in an FIR related to the Muzaffarnagar riots because he attended the mahapanchayat which was held despite prohibitory orders. He refuted allegations of inciting communal tensions by saying that he did not make any inflammatory speech and only attempted to calm down the assembled crowd. In June 2016, he released a list of Hindu families and alleged that there had been a mass exodus of Hindus from his constituency due to the law and order situation. His claims were later partially validated by a report of the National Human Rights Commission (NHRC).

== Parliamentary performance ==
Being the son of a farmer father, he understood and concerned himself with important issues related to farmers, education and infrastructure. He had participated in more debates than the national average and asked significant questions in the parliament to bring attention towards problems affecting the people of his constituency. Besides being the chairperson of the Standing Committee on Water Resources, he was a Member of the Consultative Committee, Ministry of Home Affairs and also a Member of the General Purposes Committee.

Apart from participating in public meetings and mass movements for the cause of social justice, Singh was also very active on social media and in the parliament.

Lok Sabha
Preceded by Tabassum Hasan	Member of Parliament for Kairana; 2014 – 2018	Succeeded by Tabassum Hasan
