= Shamli =

- City
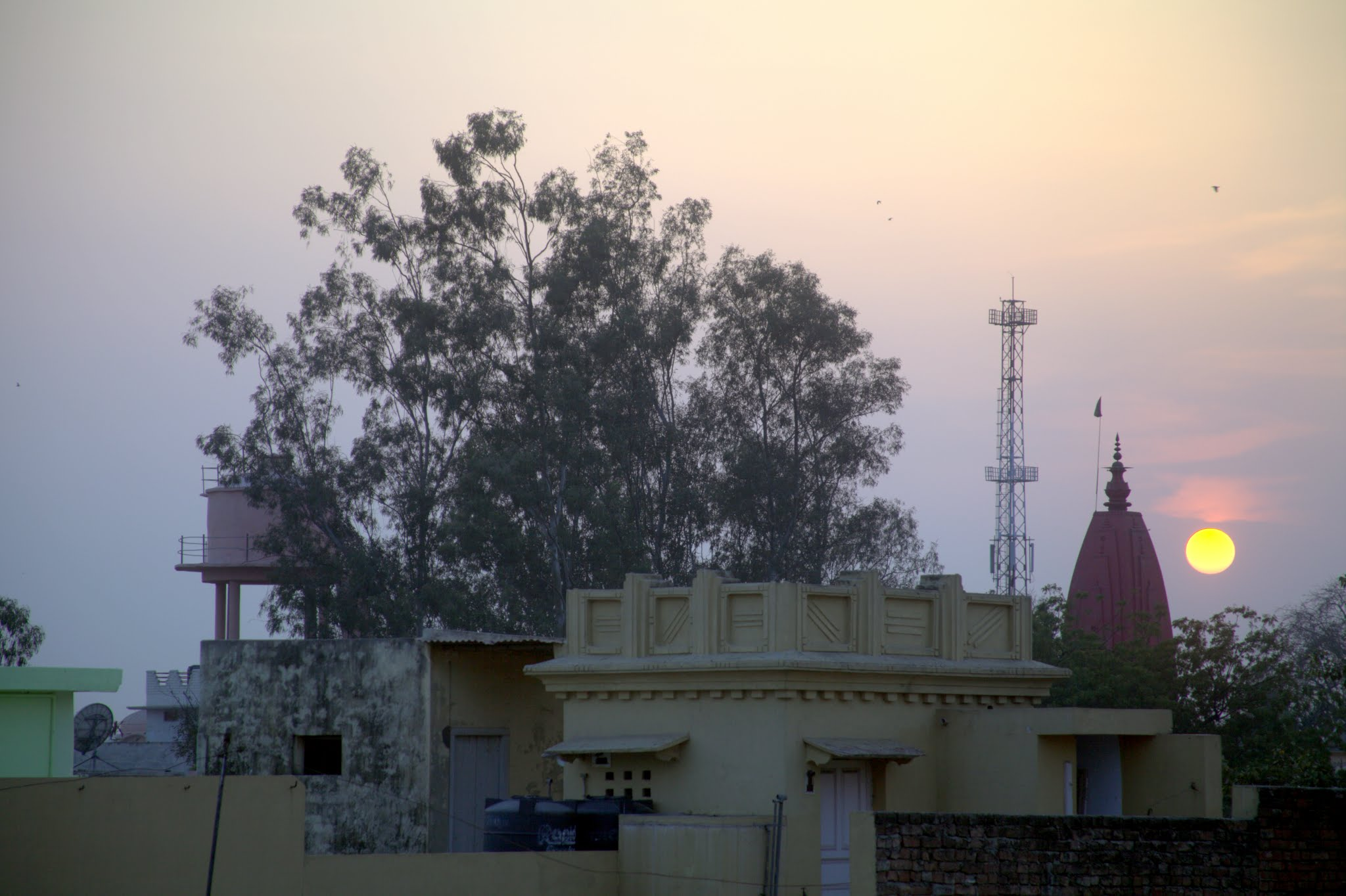
- Hanuman tilla in Shamli

- Location within Uttar Pradesh
- Coordinates: 29.45°N 77.32°E
- Country: India
- State: Uttar Pradesh
- District: Shamli

Government
  - Type: Indian
  - Body: Municipality Chairman=Arvind Sangal
  - Rank: 11
- Elevation: 254 m (833 ft)

Population (2011)
  - Total: 107,233

Languages
  - Official: Hindi
  - Native: Khariboli
- Time zone: UTC+5:30 (IST)
- PIN: 247776
- Telephone code: 1398
- Vehicle registration: UP-19
- Nearby cities: New Delhi, Panipat, Karnal, Saharanpur, Muzaffarnagar, Meerut
- Lok Sabha constituency: Kairana
- Vidhan Sabha constituency: Shamli
- Sex ratio: 1000:928 ♂/♀
- literacy_rate: 90%
- Website: www.shamli.nic.in

Shamli is a city and the headquarters of Shamli district, in the Indian state of Uttar Pradesh. It is an administrative subdivision under Saharanpur division of Uttar Pradesh.

== History ==
According to the mythological story in the Dvapara Yuga, Lord Krishna passed through the city before proceeding towards Kurukshetra from Hastinapur, and in his way he took a quick pit stop under the trees of Barne located at Hanuman Tilla in Shamli and drank some water from the nearby well. Later on, signs of Baba Bajrang Bali (Lord Hanuman) blessed the place (which was known as "Shyamvali" previously) and had its name changed to "Shyama Nagri", which eventually came to be known as Shamli. According to some stories, the town was founded by Kunti's son Bhima.

It is considered to be a very important place as the bank to Indian culture and freedom movement. According to available pieces of evidence, Maratha warriors developed it as a cantonment area and later used it as a garrison as it was considered one of the safest places to hide from the British during the Indian independence movement. During the British Raj, freedom fighters burned the "Purani Tehsil" and started the 1857 Kranti and sacrificed themselves. As a consequence of their action, the town was stripped of its administrative importance. Shamli was declared as a district in September 2011 and was named Prabuddh Nagar by then Chief Minister of Uttar Pradesh Mayawati. In July 2012, the district was renamed Shamli by Akhilesh Yadav, who became Chief Minister in 2012.

== Location ==
It is 100 km (62 mi) from Delhi, 65 km (40 mi) from Meerut and Saharanpur, 40 km (25 mi) from each Muzaffarnagar, Karnal and Panipat.

== Geography ==
Shamli is located at 29.45°N 77.32°E. It has an average elevation of 254 metres (833 ft).

== Demographics ==
Provisional data from the 2011 census shows that Shamli has a population of 107,233, of which 57,236 are male and 49,997 are female. The literacy rate is 82.97 per cent. Shamli became the first ODF (Open Defecation Free) district of Uttar Pradesh, made by the leading efforts of DM Sujeet Kumar.
