= Shamli district =

- District of Uttar Pradesh
- Location of Shəmli district in Uttar Pradesh
- Country: India
- State: Uttar Pradesh
- Division: Saharanpur
- Headquarters: Shamli
- Tehsils: Shamli, Kairana, Oon

Government
  - Vidhan Sabha constituencies: Shamli, Thanabhawan and Kairana

Area
  - Total: 1,063 km^{2} (410 sq mi)

Population (2011)
  - Total: 1,273,578
  - Density: 1,198/km^{2} (3,103/sq mi)

Demographics
  - Literacy: 81.97%
- Time zone: UTC+05:30 (IST)
- Major highways: (709B), (709A), (709AD), (Delhi-Saharanpur-Dehradun Expressway)&(Ambala-Shamli Expressway)
- Website: shamli.nic.in

Shamli is a district in the Indian state of Uttar Pradesh. This district was carved out from Muzaffarnagar District on 28 September 2011 as Prabudh Nagar and renamed Shamli in July 2012. Shamli is the headquarters of the district. Shamli is located along the Delhi-Saharanpur-Dehradun Expressway, Ambala-Shamli Expressway, Gorakhpur-Shamli Expressway, Delhi–Saharanpur (NH709B), Meerut-Karnal (NH709A) and Panipat-Khatima (NH709AD) Highways.

Shamli district comes in National Capital Region of India.

== History ==
According to the mythological story, in Dvapara Yuga Lord Krishna passed through the city before proceeding towards Kurukshetra from Hastinapur and in his way he took a quick pit stop under the trees of Barne located at Hanuman Tilla in Shamli and drank some water from the nearby well. Later on, signs of Baba Bajrang Bali (Lord Hanuman) blessed the place (which was known as “Shyamvali” previously) and had its name changed to “Shyama Nagri”, which eventually came to be known as Shamli. According to some stories, the town was founded by Kunti's son Bhima.

It is considered to be a very important place as the bank to Indian culture and freedom movement. According to available pieces of evidence, Maratha warriors developed it as a Cantonment area and later used it as a garrison as it was considered one of the safest places to hide from the Britishers during the Independence Movement. During British Raj, freedom fighters burned the “Purani Tehsil” and started the 1857 Kranti and sacrificed themselves. As a consequence of their action, the town was stripped of its administrative importance. Shamli was declared as a district in September 2011 and was named Prabuddh Nagar by then Chief Minister of Uttar Pradesh Mayawati. In July 2012, the district was renamed Shamli by Akhilesh Yadav, who became Chief Minister in 2012.

== Geography ==
Shamli City lies at the intersection of NH 709A, NH 709B and NH 709AD and is within the National Capital Region.

=== Location ===
Shamli is 100 kilometres (62 mi) from Delhi, 65 kilometres (40 mi) from Meerut and Saharanpur, 60 km (37 mi) from Baghpat, and 40 kilometres (25 mi) from Muzaffarnagar, Karnal, Panipat, and Baraut.

== Economy ==
Shamli city has an agriculture and industry based economy where sugarcane is the main crop. There are three major sugar mills located at Shamli, Un and Thanabhawan. Shamli is known worldwide for its Rim-Axle industry which also got selected under Uttar Pradesh Governments One District One Product Scheme.

It is served by Shamli railway station.

=== 2013 Riots ===
As in many other districts of western Uttar Pradesh, Shamli also suffered rioting during the 2013 Muzaffarnagar riots. A May 2015 report in India Today said that Shamli and Muzaffarnagar districts were "considered sensitive" ever since the violent riots of August and September 2013.

== Demographics ==
At the time of the 2011 census, Shamli district had a population of 1,273,578. Shamli has a sex ratio of 880 females per 1000 males. 386,102 (30.32%) lived in urban areas. Scheduled Castes made up 141,263 (11.09%) of the population.

Religions in Shamli district (2011)
Religion	Percent
Hinduism	57.09%
Islam	41.73%
Sikhism	0.57%
Other or not stated	0.61%
Distribution of religions

Tehsil	Hindus	Muslims	Others
Shamli	67.08%	32.18%	0.74%
Kairana	45.38%	52.94%	1.68%

Languages of Shamli district (2011)
1. Hindi (88.4%)
2. Urdu (11.0%)
3. Others (0.59%)

At the time of the 2011 Census of India, 88.44% of the population in the district spoke Hindi, 10.97% spoke Urdu as their first language.

== Administration ==
=== Legislative constituencies ===
There are three Uttar Pradesh Vidhan Sabha constituencies in Shamli district: Shamli, kairana, and Thanabhawan. All of these are part of Kairana Lok Sabha constituency. The current MLA for Shamli is Prasan Chaudhary, the Lok Sabha MP is Iqra Choudhary.

=== Tehsils and blocks ===
Shamli district is divided into 3 tehsils: Shamli, Kairana, and Oon.

==== Tehsils ====
- Shamli
- Kairana
- Oon

==== Blocks ====
- Shamli
- Kairana
- Thanabhawan
- Kandhla
- Oon

==== Major towns ====
- Shamli
- Kairana
- Thanabhawan
- Kandhla
- Ailum
- Oon
- Garhi Pukhta

== Transport ==
=== Rail ===
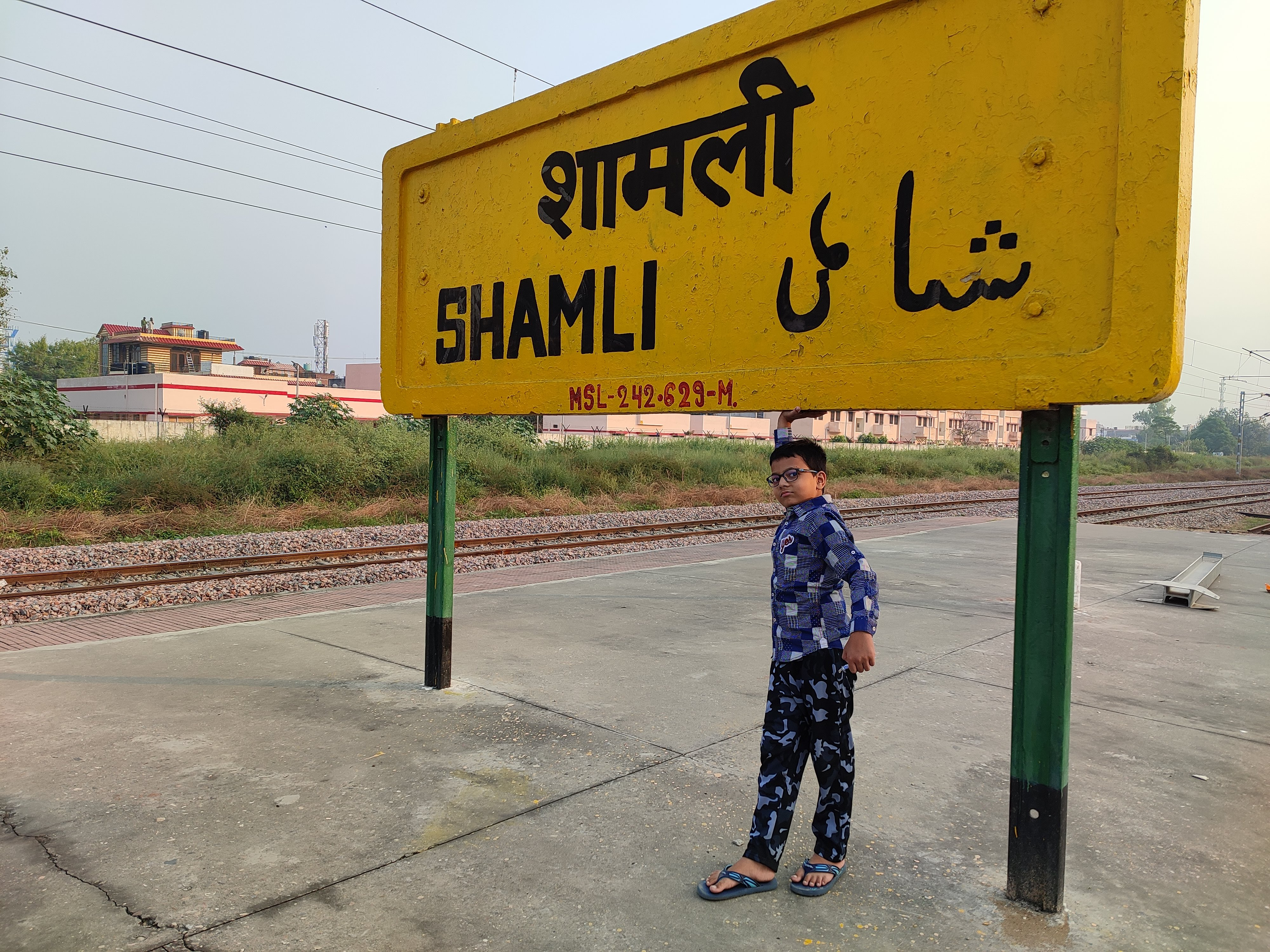
A child standing in front of SMQL station sign board

Single electric line is available from Shamli to Saharanpur and Delhi Shahdara Junction.

Delhi–Saharanpur Janta Express (Train No. 14545/14546) is the major intercity express train that runs through, averages a speed of 38 km/h.
