= Khatauli Assembly constituency =

Constituency of the Uttar Pradesh legislative assembly in India

Khatauli
- Constituency No. 15 for the Uttar Pradesh Legislative Assembly

Constituency details
- Country: India
- Region: North India
- State: Uttar Pradesh
- District: Muzaffarnagar
- Lok Sabha constituency: Muzaffarnagar
- Reservation: None

Member of Legislative Assembly
- 18th Uttar Pradesh Legislative Assembly
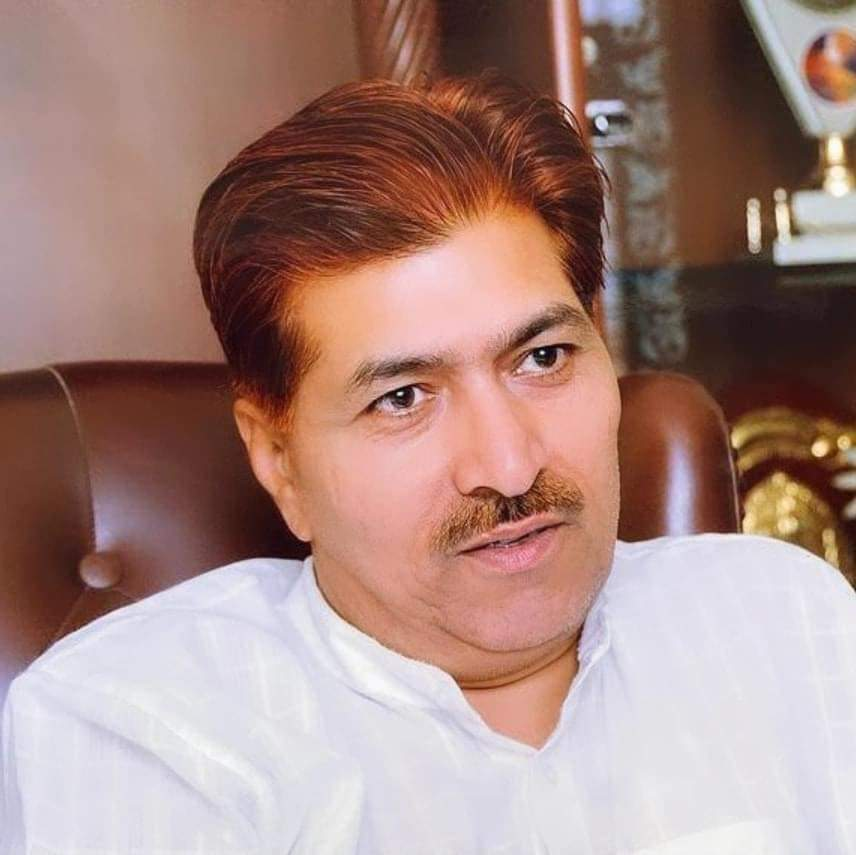
- Incumbent Madan Singh Kasana
- Party: RLD
- Alliance: NDA
- Elected year: 2022

Khatauli Assembly constituency is one of the 403 constituencies of the Uttar Pradesh Legislative Assembly, India. It is a part of the Muzaffarnagar district and one of the five assembly constituencies in the Muzaffarnagar Lok Sabha constituency. The first election in this assembly constituency was held in 1967 after the "Delimitation Order" (Delimitation Commission - 1967) was passed in 1967. In 2008, after the "Delimitation of Parliamentary and Assembly Constituencies Order, 2008" was passed, this constituency was assigned identification number 15.

== Wards and areas ==
Extent of Khatauli Assembly constituency is Khatauli, Mansoorpur, PCs Jansath, Talada, Tisang, Mehalaki, Khedachogawan, Basayach, Nangalachadhav of Jansath KC, Khatauli NPP, Khatauli (CT) & Jansath NP of Jansath Tehsil.

== Members of the Legislative Assembly ==
Election	Name	Party
1967	Chaudhary Sardar Singh	Communist Party of India
1969	Virendra Verma	Bharatiya Kranti Dal
1974	Laxman Singh	Bharatiya Kranti Dal
1977	Laxman Singh	Janata Party
1980	Dharamveer Singh	Indian National Congress
1985	Harendra Malik	Lokdal
1989	Dharamveer Singh	Janata Dal
1991	Sudhir Baliyan	Bharatiya Janata Party
1993	Sudhir Baliyan	Bharatiya Janata Party
1996	Rajpal Singh Baliyan	Bharatiya Kisan Kamgar Party
2002	Rajpal Singh Baliyan	Rashtriya Lok Dal
2007	Yograj Singh	Bahujan Samaj Party
2012	Kartar Singh Bhadana	Rashtriya Lok Dal
2017	Vikram Saingh Saini	Bharatiya Janata Party
2022	Vikram Saingh Saini	Bharatiya Janata Party
2022^	Madan Singh Kasana	Rashtriya Lok Dal

^By poll

== Election results ==
=== 2027 ===
2027 Uttar Pradesh Legislative Assembly election: Khatauli
Party	Candidate	Votes	%	±%
INDIA				
NDA				
BSP				
NOTA	None of the above			
Majority				
Turnout				
gain from		Swing		

=== 2022 bypoll ===
2022 Uttar Pradesh Legislative Assembly election: Khatauli
Party	Candidate	Votes	%	±%
RLD	Madan Singh Kasana	97,139	54.04	+16.06
BJP	Rajkumari Vikram Saini	74,996	41.72	−3.62
Independent	Ramesh Prajapati	1,849	1.03	New
Independent	Pramod Arya	1,803	1.00	New
Majority		22,143	12.32	
Turnout		1,79,758	57.38	
RLD gain from BJP		Swing		

=== 2022 ===
2022 Uttar Pradesh Legislative Assembly election: Khatauli
Party	Candidate	Votes	%	±%
BJP	Vikram Singh Saini	100,651	45.34	+0.87
RLD	Rajpal Singh Saini	84,306	37.98	+31.95
BSP	Kartar Singh Bhadana	31,412	14.15	−3.39
NOTA	None of the above	824	0.37	+0.04
Majority		16,345	7.36	−7.36
Turnout		221,969	69.79	−1.54
BJP hold		Swing		

=== 2017 ===
2017 Uttar Pradesh Legislative Assembly election: Khatauli
Party	Candidate	Votes	%	±%
BJP	Vikram Singh Saini	94,771	44.47	
SP	Chandan Chauhan	63,397	29.75	
BSP	Shivan Singh Saini	37,380	17.54	
RLD	Shahnawaz Rana	12,846	6.03	
NOTA	None of the above	694	0.33	
Majority		31,374	14.72	
Turnout		213,096	71.33	
BJP gain from RLD		Swing		

=== 2012 ===
2012 Uttar Pradesh Legislative Assembly election: Khatauli
Party	Candidate	Votes	%	±%
RLD	Kartar Singh Bhadana	46,722	27.45	−
BSP	Tarachand Shastri	40,847	24	−
SP	Shyam Lal	39,358	23.12	−
BJP	Sudhir Saini	19,029	11.18	−
Majority		5,875	3.45	−
Turnout		170,229	62.53	−
RLD gain from BSP		Swing		

== See also ==
- Muzaffarnagar Lok Sabha constituency
- Muzaffarnagar district
- List of constituencies of the Uttar Pradesh Legislative Assembly
