= S. Saiduzzaman =

Indian politician

Ex-MP S. Saiduzzaman

Member of Parliament, Lok Sabha for Muzaffarnagar
- In office 1999–2004
- Preceded by: Sohanveer Singh
- Succeeded by: Chaudhary Munawwar Hasan

Member of Legislative Assembly for Morna
- In office 1985–1989
- Preceded by: Mehndi Asgar
- Succeeded by: Amir Alam Khan

Personal details
- Born: Muzaffarnagar, Uttar Pradesh
- Party: Indian National Congress

S. Saiduzzaman is an Indian politician, belonging to Indian National Congress. In the 1999 election he was elected to the Lok Sabha from Muzaffarnagar (Lok Sabha constituency). He was elected to the 9th Uttar Pradesh Assembly from Morna (Assembly constituency). He also served as the Minister of State for Home Affairs in N. D. Tiwari and Vir Bahadur Singh cabinet.

== Positions held ==
Year	Description
1985 – 1989	Elected to the 9th Uttar Pradesh Assembly from Morna (Assembly constituency): Member - Estimates Committee, Uttar Pradesh; Minister of State for Home Affairs
1999 – 2004	Elected to 13th Lok Sabha from Muzaffarnagar (Lok Sabha constituency): Member - Rules Committee; Member - Committee on Members of Parliament Local Area Development Scheme; Member - Committee on External Affairs; Member - Consultative Committee, Ministry of Home Affairs

== Elections contested ==
Year	Election Type	Constituency	Result	Vote percentage	Opposition Candidate	Opposition Party	Opposition vote percentage	Ref
1980	MLA	Morna	Lost	25.91%	Mahendi Asghar	JNP (SC)	27.30%	
1985	MLA	Morna	Won	34.66%	Mahendi Asghar	IND	22.47%	
1989	MLA	Morna	Lost	35.06%	Amir Alam Khan	JD	50.64%	
1991	MLA	Morna	Lost	20.49%	Ram Pal Singh	BJP	38.58%	
1993	MLA	Morna	Lost	33.48%	Ram Pal Singh	BJP	38.09%	
1996	MP	Muzaffarnagar	Lost	8.74%	Sohan Veer	BJP	36.93%	
1999	MP	Muzaffarnagar	Won	28.82%	Sohanveer Singh	BJP	25.05%	
2004	MP	Muzaffarnagar	Lost	12.19%	Ch. Munawwar Hasan	SP	35.50%	
2007	MLA	Muzaffarnagar	Lost	4.95%	Ashok Kumar Kansal	BJP	31.78%	
2009	MP	Bijnor	Lost	6.62%	Sanjay Singh Chauhan	RLD	19.00%	
2012	MLA	Charthawal	Lost	15.38%	Noor Saleem Rana	BSP	31.02%	
