= Yograj Singh (politician) =

Indian politician (born 1975)

Member of the Uttar Pradesh Legislative Assembly
- In office May 2007 – March 2012
- Preceded by: Rajpal Singh Baliyan
- Succeeded by: Kartar Singh Bhadana
- Constituency: Khatauli

Personal details
- Born: 25 June 1975 (age 50) Muzaffarnagar district, Uttar Pradesh
- Party: Rashtriya Lok Dal
- Parent: Jagveer Singh (Father)
- Profession: Farming, Politician

Yograj Singh is an Indian politician and former Minister in Government of Uttar Pradesh. He is currently serving as State vice president of the Rashtriya Lok Dal.

== Early life and education ==
Yograj Singh completed his high school and intermediate from S.D Inter College Muzaffarnagar.

Singh went to Bengaluru and attained BTech Degree from Ramaiah Institute of Technology in 1996.

== Political career ==
Yograj Singh came in active politics after his father's assassination in 2003.

Singh became MLA in 2007 from Khatauli Assembly constituency defeating incumbent MLA senior leader Rajpal Singh Baliyan and Rakesh Tikait of Bahujan Kisan Dal. Chief Minister Mayawati nominated him in her cabinet as state minister in the Ministry of Agro Education & Research where he completed full term of 5 years in Bahujan Samaj Party Government from 2007 to 2012.

Singh contested again in 2012 from BSP but lost from Nawazish Alam Khan of Samajwadi Party in newly created Budhana Assembly constituency. In 2015 he joined Rashtriya Lok Dal and contested re election from same seat in 2017 but lost to BJP candidate Umesh Malik.

Currently he is active in Rashtriya Lok Dal organization and works as State vice president of the Party.
