= Baliyan (surname) =

Baliyan is an Indian surname. Notable people with the surname include:

- Naresh Balyan, Indian politician from Delhi
- Naresh Kumar Baliyan (1935–2013), Indian politician from Uttar Pradesh
- Sanjeev Balyan, Indian politician
- Gourav Baliyan, Indian wrestler
- Vidisha Baliyan, Indian deaf model and Miss Deaf World 2019
- Sahil Singh Baliyan, Founder of Jatchiefs website , It contains information on more than 350 Jat families, details of over 1,000 personalities, and more than 7,000 pictures on their website — along with the complete history of the Jats up to the present day. Currently, they are working on their new project, the book “The Houses of Jats.”
