= Sohanveer Singh =

Indian politician (born 1950)

Member of the Parliament
- In office March 1996 – March 1999
- Preceded by: Naresh Kumar Balyan
- Succeeded by: S. Saiduzzaman
- Constituency: Muzaffarnagar

Personal details
- Born: 4 October 1950 (age 76) Rajpur Kalan, Jansath Block, Muzaffarnagar, Uttar Pradesh, India
- Party: Bharatiya Janata Party
- Education: BSc,LLB in Meerut University
- Occupation: Agriculture
- Profession: Agriculture

Sohanveer Singh (born 4 October 1950) is an Indian politician. He belongs to the Bharatiya Janata Party. He was a member of the 11th Lok Sabha representing the Muzaffarnagar (Lok Sabha constituency).

== Early life and education ==
Sohanveer Singh obtained BSC and LLB Degree from DAV College Muzaffarnagar, after completing his education he has been primarily working as an agriculturist.

== Political career ==
Sohanveer Singh started his political career as a farmers rights activist from District Muzaffarnagar, U.P. He actively participated in Ram Janam Bhoomi movement.

He contested and won elections in 1996 (11th Lok Sabha) and 1998 (12th Lok Sabha) by defeating Sanjay Singh Chauhan and Harendra Singh Malik of Samajwadi Party respectively.

Singh failed to register his third win hat trick and lost toCongress candidate S. Saiduzzaman. He was suffering from 4th stage cancer during that time.
