= Muzaffarnagar Lok Sabha constituency =

Lok Sabha Constituency in Uttar Pradesh, India

Coordinates: 29.5°N 77.71°E

Muzaffarnagar UP-3
- Interactive Map Outlining Muzaffarnagar Lok Sabha constituency

Constituency details
- Country: India
- Region: North India
- State: Uttar Pradesh
- Assembly constituencies: Budhana; Charthawal; Muzaffarnagar; Khatauli; Sardhana
- Established: 1952
- Total electors: 18,17,472
- Reservation: None

Member of Legislative Assembly
- 18th Uttar Pradesh Legislative Assembly
- Incumbent Harendra Singh Malik
- Party: Samajwadi Party
- Alliance: INDIA
- Elected year: 2024
- Preceded by: Sanjeev Kumar Balyan, Bharatiya Janata Party BJP

Muzaffarnagar Lok Sabha constituency (Hindi pronunciation: [mʊzəfːəɾ.nəgəɾ], also [mʊd͡ʒəp.pʰəɾ.nəgəɾ]) is one of the 80 Lok Sabha (parliamentary) constituencies in the Indian state of Uttar Pradesh.

== Assembly segments ==
Muzaffarnagar Lok Sabha constituency comprises five Vidhan Sabha (legislative assembly) segments. These are:

| No | Name | District | Member | Party | 2024 Lead |
|---|---|---|---|---|---|
| 11 | Budhana | Muzaffarnagar | Rajpal Singh Baliyan | RLD | SP |
| 12 | Charthawal | Muzaffarnagar | Pankaj Kumar Malik | SP | SP |
| 14 | Muzaffarnagar | Muzaffarnagar | Kapil Dev Aggarwal | BJP | BJP |
| 15 | Khatauli | Muzaffarnagar | Madan Singh Kasana | RLD | BJP |
| 44 | Sardhana | Meerut | Atul Pradhan | SP | SP |

== Members of Parliament ==
| Year | Member | Party |
|---|---|---|
| 1952 | Hira Vallabh Tripathi | Indian National Congress |
| 1952 | Sunder Lal | Indian National Congress |
| 1952 | Ajit Prasad Jain | Indian National Congress |
| 1957 | Sumat Prasad | Indian National Congress |
| 1962 | Sumat Prasad | Indian National Congress |
| 1967 | Latafat Ali Khan | Communist Party of India |
| 1971 | THAKUR Vijai Pal Singh | Communist Party of India |
| 1977 | Saeed Murtaza | Janata Party |
| 1980 | Ghayoor Ali Khan | Janata Party (Secular) |
| 1984 | Dharamvir Singh Tyagi | Indian National Congress |
| 1989 | Mufti Mohammad Sayeed | Janata Dal |
| 1991 | Naresh Kumar Balyan | Bharatiya Janata Party |
| 1996 | Sohanveer Singh | Bharatiya Janata Party |
| 1998 | Sohanveer Singh | Bharatiya Janata Party |
| 1999 | S. Saiduzzaman | Indian National Congress |
| 2004 | Munawwar Hasan | Samajwadi Party |
| 2009 | Kadir Rana | Bahujan Samaj Party |
| 2014 | Sanjeev Balyan | Bharatiya Janata Party |
| 2019 | Sanjeev Balyan | Bharatiya Janata Party |
| 2024 | Harendra Singh Malik | Samajwadi Party |

BJP and INC are Most successful political parties in Muzaffarnagar (Uttar Pradesh) Lok Sabha elections
1. BJP (5 terms) (27.8%)
2. INC (5 terms) (27.8%)
3. SP (2 terms) (11.1%)
4. CPI (2 terms) (11.1%)
5. JP (1 terms) (5.55%)
6. JD (1 terms) (5.55%)
7. BSP (1 terms) (5.55%)
8. JP(S) (1 terms) (5.55%)

== Elections results ==
=== General election 2024 ===
2024 Indian general elections: Muzaffarnagar
| Party | Candidate | Votes | % | ±% |
|---|---|---|---|---|
| SP | Harendra Singh Malik | 470,721 | 43.64 | new |
| BJP | Sanjeev Balyan | 4,46,049 | 41.35 | ▼7.99 |
| BSP | Dara Singh Prajapati | 1,43,707 | 13.32 | ▲13.32 |
| NOTA | None of the above | 3,916 | 0.36 | ▼0.08 |
| Margin of victory | | 24,672 | 2.29 | ▲1.96 |
| Turnout | | 10,78,669 | 59.35 | ▼8.85 |
| Registered electors | | 18,17,322 | | |
| SP gain from BJP | | Swing | | |

Legislative Assembly Wise Results

| No. | Assembly | 1st Position | Party | Votes | % | 2nd Position | Party | Votes | % | 3rd Position | Party | Votes | % | Margin |
|---|---|---|---|---|---|---|---|---|---|---|---|---|---|---|
| 11 | Budhana | Harendra Singh Malik | SP | 1,16,151 | 42.56% | Sanjeev Balyan | BJP | 1,00,075 | 31.86% | Dara Singh Prajapati | BSP | 20,288 | 19.81% | ▲16,076 |
| 12 | Charthawal | Harendra Singh Malik | SP | 95,766 | 41.07% | Sanjeev Balyan | BJP | 82,085 | 34.77% | Dara Singh Prajapati | BSP | 30,308 | 22.73% | ▲13,681 |
| 44 | Sardhana | Harendra Singh Malik | SP | 80,826 | 37.67% | Sanjeev Balyan | BJP | 80,781 | 37.66% | Dara Singh Prajapati | BSP | 37,756 | 26.69% | ▲45 |
| 14 | Sadar | Sanjeev Balyan | BJP | 97,401 | 40.86% | Harendra Singh Malik | SP | 96,600 | 39.84% | Dara Singh Prajapati | BSP | 17,570 | 16.54% | ▼801 |
| 15 | Khatauli | Sanjeev Balyan | BJP | 83,473 | 36.56% | Harendra Singh Malik | SP | 80,461 | 34.70% | Dara Singh Prajapati | BSP | 37,401 | 25.60% | ▼3012 |

=== 2019 ===
2019 Indian general elections: Muzaffarnagar
| Party | Candidate | Votes | % | ±% |
|---|---|---|---|---|
| BJP | Dr. Sanjeev Kumar Balyan | 573,780 | 49.39 | ▼9.59 |
| RLD | Chaudhary Ajit Singh | 5,67,254 | 48.83 | ▲48.83 |
| NOTA | None of the above | 5,110 | 0.44 | |
| Majority | | 6,526 | 0.33 | |
| Turnout | | 11,60,071 | 68.32 | ▼1.4 |
| BJP hold | | Swing | ▼9.64 | |

=== General election 2014 ===
2014 Indian general elections: Muzaffarnagar
| Party | Candidate | Votes | % | ±% |
|---|---|---|---|---|
| BJP | Dr. Sanjeev Kumar Balyan | 6,53,391 | 58.98 | N/A |
| BSP | Kadir Rana | 2,52,241 | 22.77 | ▼14.19 |
| SP | Choudhary Virender Singh | 1,60,810 | 14.52 | ▲0.20 |
| INC | Pankaj Agarwal | 12,937 | 1.17 | ▼8.74 |
| NOTA | None of the above | 4,739 | 0.43 | N/A |
| Margin of victory | | 4,01,150 | 36.21 | ▲33.44 |
| Turnout | | 11,07,765 | 69.74 | ▲15.37 |
| BJP gain from BSP | | Swing | ▲51.91 | |

=== General election 2009 ===
2009 Indian general elections: Muzaffarnagar
| Party | Candidate | Votes | % | ±% |
|---|---|---|---|---|
| BSP | Kadir Rana | 2,75,318 | 36.96 | |
| RLD | Anuradha Chaudhary | 2,54,720 | 34.19 | |
| SP | Sangeet Singh Som | 1,06,667 | 14.32 | |
| INC | Harendra Singh Malik | 73,848 | 9.91 | |
| PECP | Abdul Aziz Ansari | 6,537 | 0.88 | |
| Margin of victory | | 20,598 | 2.77 | |
| Turnout | | 7,45,001 | 54.37 | |
| BSP gain from SP | | Swing | | |

== See also ==
- Muzaffarnagar district
- List of constituencies of the Lok Sabha
