= Saeed Murtaza =

Indian politician (born 1939)

Member of Parliament for Muzaffarnagar
- In office March 1977 – August 1979
- Preceded by: Vijai Pal Singh
- Succeeded by: Ghayoor Ali Khan

Personal details
- Born: 1912 (age 113–114) Purkazi
- Died: 30,September 1996 Purkazi, Muzaffarnagar
- Children: Saiduzzaman MLA,xM.P & Home Minister
- Grand Son Salman Sayeed

Saeed Murtaza (born 1912) was an Indian politician. He was a member of 6th Lok Sabha from Muzaffarnagar constituency in Uttar Pradesh. Saeed Murtaza died on 30 September 1996 by natural causes.

== Positions held ==
- Vice-Chairman - District Board, Muzaffarnagar
- Chairman - Town Area, Purqazi
- Member - Uttar Pradesh Legislative Assembly, 1969-74
- Member - 6th Lok Sabha, 1977–79
- Deputy Minister of Irrigation, Uttar Pradesh

Lok Sabha
Preceded by Vijaypal Singh Tomar	Member of Parliament for Muzaffarnagar; 1977 – 1979	Succeeded by Ghayoor Ali Khan
