= Rajpal Singh Baliyan =

Indian politician (born 1951)

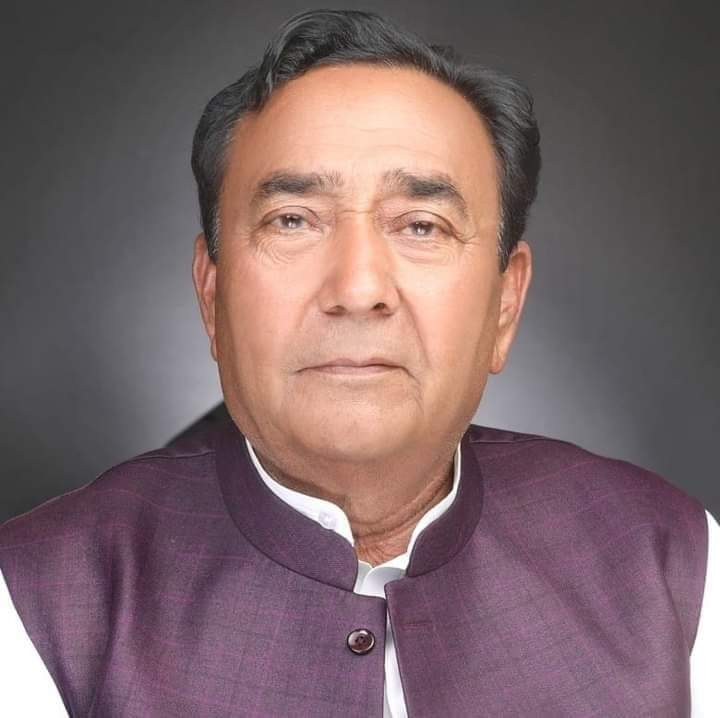

Leader, RLD in Uttar Pradesh Legislative Assembly
- Incumbent
- Assumed office 29 March 2022

Member of Uttar Pradesh Legislative Assembly
- Incumbent
- Assumed office 10 March 2022
- Preceded by: Umesh Malik
- Constituency: Budhana
- In office 17 October 1996 – 13 May 2007
- Preceded by: Sudhir Kumar Baliyan
- Succeeded by: Yograj Singh
- Constituency: Khatauli

Personal details
- Born: 1 July 1951 (age 75) Muzaffarnagar, Uttar Pradesh, India
- Party: Rashtriya Lok Dal
- Other political affiliations: National Democratic Alliance (2024–present)
- Children: Anil Baliyan
- Profession: Agriculturist & politician

Rajpal Singh Baliyan is an Indian politician and member of the 18th Uttar Pradesh Assembly. Baliyan represented Budhana (Assembly constituency) constituency of Uttar Pradesh and is a member of Rashtriya Lok Dal.

== Political career ==
Rajpal Baliyan was a close aide of farmer leader Mahendra Singh Tikait and senior leader of Bharatiya Kisan Union in his early days.

Rajpal Baliyan was first elected as MLA from Khatauli Assembly constituency in 1996 with the support of Bharatiya Kisan Union defeating incumbent minister Sudhir Kumar Baliyan of Bharatiya Janata Party by 37,790 votes. He was re-elected from the same seat in next election of 2002 defeating Pramod Tyagi of Samajwadi Party by 28,171 votes.

In the 2007 election, he lost from Bahujan Samaj Party candidate Yograj Singh by 16,021 votes. After 5 years in 2012, he again lost from Nawazish Alam Khan of Samajwadi Party by 10,000 votes. In 2017 election party chief Ajit Singh denied a ticket to him but he again got a ticket from the Budhana Assembly constituency in 2022. He won by huge margin this time defeating BJP's firebrand leader Umesh Malik by 28,310 votes.
