= Vijai Pal Singh =

Indian politician (1923–1996)

Vijay Pal Singh
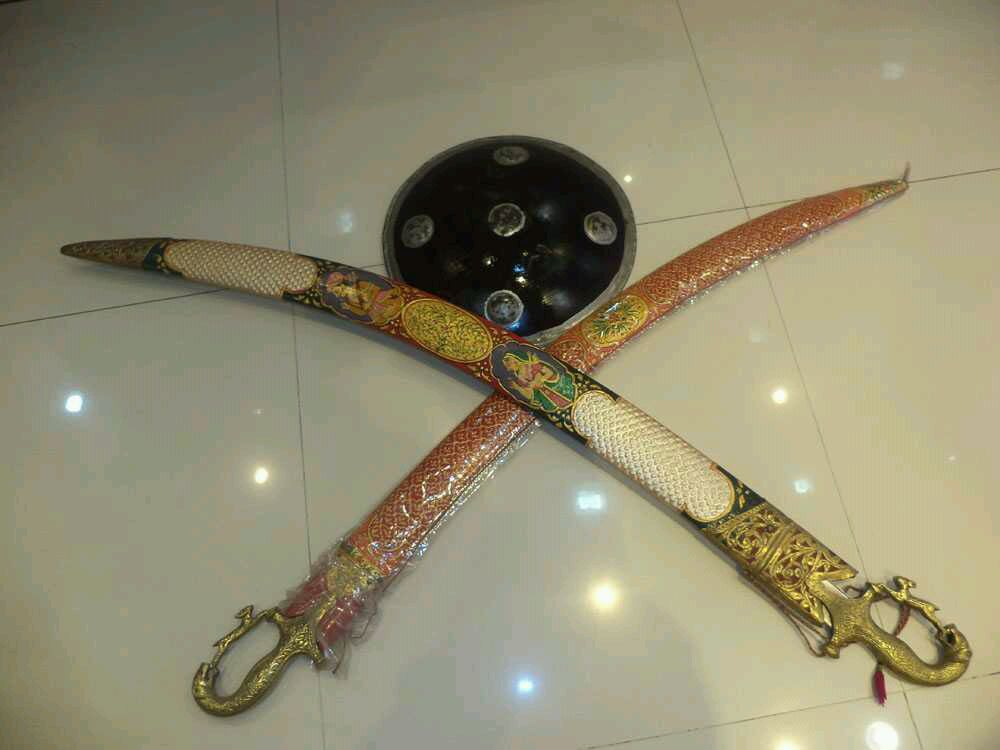

Member of the Parliament 7th Lok Sabha
- In office 1971–1977
- Preceded by: Latafat Ali Khan
- Succeeded by: Saeed Murtaza
- Constituency: Muzaffarnagar

Personal details
- Born: 23 February 1923 Muzaffarnagar, India
- Died: 6 May 1996 (aged 73) Muzaffarnagar, India
- Party: Communist Party of India

Vijay Pal Singh (23 February 1923 – 6 May 1996) was an Indian and Member of Parliament from village Biral of Tehsil Budhana district Muzaffarnagar. Singh was a member of Communist Party of India, while in office in 1971.

Singh died in Muzaffarnagar on 6 May 1996, at the age of 73.
