= Ghayoor Ali Khan =

Indian politician (1909–1989)

Member of the Parliament 7th Lok Sabha
- In office 1980–1984
- Preceded by: Saeed Murtaza
- Succeeded by: Dharamvir Singh Tyagi
- Constituency: Muzaffarnagar

Personal details
- Born: 7 October 1909
- Died: 4 July 1989 (aged 79) New Delhi, India
- Party: Janata Party (Secular)

Ghayoor Ali Khan (7 October 1909 – 7 April 1989) was an Indian politician. He was a Member of Parliament from Muzaffarnagar constituency in Uttar Pradesh. He was a member of the Janata Party (Secular), while in office in 1980.

Khan died in New Delhi on 7 April 1989, at the age of 79.
