= Latafat Ali Khan =

Indian politician (1921–2010)

Member of Parliament for Muzaffarnagar
- In office March 1967 – August 1971
- Preceded by: Sumat Prasad
- Succeeded by: Vijai Pal Singh

Personal details
- Born: 20 September 1921 Mathra village, Muzaffarnagar, India
- Died: 23 November 2010 (aged 89) Noida, Uttar Pradesh, India

Latafat Ali Khan (20 September 1921 – 23 November 2010) was an Indian politician. He was a member of 4th Lok Sabha from Muzaffarnagar constituency in Uttar Pradesh.

Khan was born in Mathra village in Muzaffarnagar on 20 September 1921. He died in Noida, Uttar Pradesh on 23 November 2010, at the age of 89.
