= Harendra Singh Malik =

Indian politician

Member of Parliament, Lok Sabha
- Incumbent
- Assumed office 4 June 2024
- Preceded by: Sanjeev Balyan
- Constituency: Muzaffarnagar

Member of Parliament for Rajya Sabha
- In office 10 April 2002 – 9 April 2008
- Constituency: Haryana

MLA for Uttar Pradesh Legislative Assembly
- In office 1985–1989
- Preceded by: Dharamvir Singh Tyagi
- Succeeded by: Dharamveer Balyan
- Constituency: Khatauli
- In office 1989–1996
- Preceded by: Babu Singh
- Succeeded by: Pradeep Baliyan
- Constituency: Baghra

Personal details
- Born: 15 February 1954 (age 72) Muzzafarnagar, Uttar Pradesh, India
- Party: Samajwadi Party
- Children: 2
- Education: Chaudhary Charan Singh University
- Profession: Politician, farmer

Harendra Singh Malik (Hindi pronunciation: [ɦəɾeːn̪d̪ɾə sɪŋgʱ maːlɪk]) is a current Member of the Parliament of India from Muzaffarnagar Lok Sabha in Uttar Pradesh. He previously served as a Member of the Rajya Sabha, the upper house of the Indian Parliament, representing Haryana.

Harendra Malik began his political career in 1978 when he contested his first student union election at DAV College, Muzaffarnagar. He was later elected as a Block Development Committee (BDC) member and filed his nomination for the post of Block Pramukh from Baghra. However, his nomination was rejected due to not meeting the age requirement. Subsequently, his elder brother was elected as the Block Pramukh from Baghra. Following this event, Harendra Malik became more actively involved in politics and was elected as a Member of the Legislative Assembly (MLA) in 1985.

Then Malik came into lime light after elected as a Member of the Legislative Assembly (MLA) in 1985, representing the Khatauli constituency on a Lok Dal ticket. In 1989, he shifted to the Baghra constituency after joining the Janata Dal, serving as an MLA for the next seven years. Throughout his career, Malik has been a dedicated farmers' leader, advocating for their interests at various levels.

His son, Pankaj Kumar Malik, has also pursued a career in politics. He was elected as an MLA for two consecutive terms from 2007 to 2017, representing the Baghra and Shamli Assembly seats in the 15th and 16th legislative assemblies of Uttar Pradesh, respectively. In 2022, Pankaj Kumar Malik was elected again for a third term, representing the Charthawal constituency in the 18th Uttar Pradesh Assembly.

In the 2024 Lok Sabha Election, Harendra Singh Malik from Samajwadi party won Muzaffarnagar seat with a vote margin 24672 and got total 470721 Votes.

== Positions held ==
| Year | Description |
|---|---|
| 1982 | Member, Local Area Committee of Muzaffarnagar |
| 1985 | Elected to 9th Uttar Pradesh Legislative Assembly: Whip, Legislature Party (1985–89) |
| 1989 | Elected to 10th Uttar Pradesh Legislative Assembly (2nd term): Whip, Legislature Party (1989–91) |
| 1991 | Elected to 11th Uttar Pradesh Legislative Assembly (3rd term): Whip, Legislature Party (1991-1992) |
| 1993 | Elected to 12th Uttar Pradesh Legislative Assembly (4th term): Chairman, Committee on Government Assurances (1993–95); Chief Whip, Legislature Party (1993–95) |
| 2002 | Elected to Rajya Sabha: Member, Committee on Railways (2002–04); Member, Consultative Committee for the Ministry of Tourism (2004–06); Member, Consultative Committee for the Ministry of Finance (2004–08); Member, Committee on Subordinate Legislation (2004–08); Member, Committee on the Welfare of Scheduled Castes and Scheduled Tribes (2006–08) |
| 2024 | Elected to Lok Sabha: Member, Committee on Finance (2024-); Chairman, Committee on Government Assurances (2025-) |
