= Sumat Prasad =

Indian politician

Member of Parliament, Rajya Sabha
- In office 1952-1957
- Constituency: Uttar Pradesh

Member of Parliament Lok Sabha
- In office 1957-1967
- Constituency: Muzaffarnagar, Uttar Pradesh
- Preceded by: Hira Vallabh Tripathi
- Succeeded by: Latafat Ali Khan

Personal details
- Born: August 1893 Abhu Pura Street Muzaffarnagar
- Died: Unknown
- Party: Indian National Congress

Sumat Prasad (born August 1893, date of death unknown) was an Indian politician. He was a Member of Parliament, representing Uttar Pradesh in the Rajya Sabha the upper house of India's Parliament representing the Indian National Congress.
