= Sangeet Singh Som =

Indian politician

Member of Legislative Assembly
- In office 6 March 2012 – 10 March 2022
- Preceded by: Chandra Veer Singh
- Succeeded by: Atul Pradhan
- Constituency: Sardhana, Uttar Pradesh

Personal details
- Born: 1 January 1978 (age 48) Meerut, Uttar Pradesh, India
- Party: Bharatiya Janata Party
- Other political affiliations: Samajwadi Party (before 2010)
- Spouse: Preeti Som
- Children: 2

Thakur Sangeet Som is a BJP politician based in Sardhana, Meerut. He is former Member of Legislative Assembly from the Sardhana constituency.

== Personal life and education ==
Sangeet Som was born in affluent agricultural family of Thakur Omveer Singh in Village Alamgeer (Faridpur) in Sardhana Tehsil of Meerut District. He completed his Secondary Education from K.K. Jain Inter college Khatauli a nearby city in Muzaffarnagar District in 1997. Sangeet Singh Som is married to Preeti Som Sangeet and has two children.

== Political career ==
Sangeet Singh Som won from the Sardhana assembly seat with good margin. He is a very popular figure among the Hindu population of the area and has received various titles like “Hindu Hirday Samrat”, "Mahathakur," "Sangharshveer," etc. by different Hindu organizations.

=== 2013 Muzaffarnagar riots ===
He is one of the accused in the 2013 Muzaffarnagar riots and was booked under the National Security Act on 24 September 2013. Justice Vishnu Sahai Commission's report on Muzaffarnagar riots of 2013 has put him on top of the list of those it has found responsible for the flare-up. On 18 January 2017, Som was booked for showing clips from the riots as part of a documentary.

On 7 September 2015, Som alleged that the Samajwadi Party and the Uttar Pradesh police were discriminating on religious grounds in their probe in the Janmashtami clashes, which he said was biased. Contested Indian General Election 2009 from Muzaffarnagar (Lok Sabha constituency) as Samajwadi Party candidate and finished third.

Sangeet Singh Som was named in legal cases related to the 2013 Muzaffarnagar riots. A special MP/MLA court in Muzaffarnagar accepted the closure report submitted by a special investigation team (SIT) of the Uttar Pradesh police in a case against BJP MLA Sangeet Som who allegedly uploaded a video on social media and others who shared it, triggering communal riots in Muzaffarnagar in 2013.

On 13 October 2022, a Gautam Budh Nagar Court found Som, guilty of giving hate speech and convicted him under section 188 (disobedience to order duly promulgated by public servant). He was fined and released.

Despite being known as an anti-cow-slaughter campaigner, documentary evidence revealed that Som had been personally associated with two meat processing and export companies, Al-Dua and Al-Anam. Al-Dua has been described as one of India's leading halal meat export companies which exports meat to Arab countries. Speaking with the Hindustan Times on October 9, 2015, Som claimed he was unaware of having been made a director of Al-Dua, and that as a "Hindu hardliner" it was not possible for him to engage in such an activity. However, the next day, Som admitted to The Hindu that he was a director of Al-Dua for about two years. As per The Hindu, Al-Dua's company website states:"Al Dua Food Processing are specialists in the export of quality halal buffalo, sheep/lamb, goat meat and hides."

On 11 February 2017, the day of the first phase of the 2017 Assembly election, Som's brother was arrested in Faridpur for carrying a pistol into a polling booth.

== Political positions ==
Som favoured imprisoning Mohammed Akhlaq's family who died in the 2015 Dadri lynching. He also promised bail for the arrested accused in the case.

On 9 November 2018, Singh claimed that Muzaffarnagar should be renamed Lakshminagar.
