= Asghari Begum =

Indian freedom fighter (1811–1857)

Asghari Begum (1811–1857) was an Indian freedom fighter who took part in the Indian Rebellion of 1857. She was burnt alive by the British army.

== Early life ==
She was born to Alim Shah Abdul Rahim in 1811 in Thana Bhawan, presently Muzaffarnagar in Uttar Pradesh, India.

== Role in 1857 ==
In October 1857, amidst the First War of Independence, the British forces led by Major Sawyer launched an assault on Thana Bhawan, a town in Muzaffarnagar that had been freed by Indian revolutionaries. They were taken aback to observe that, in contrast to their European counterparts, women from the nearby villages were actively engaged in armed conflicts. To instill fear among the women, Sawyer apprehended Asghari Begum, who was organizing a group of women to resist the British, and she was subsequently burned alive in public by the Britishers. Along with Ashgari, her associates; Asha Devi, Bibi, Bhagwani, Bhagwati, Habeeba, Inder Kaur, and Jamila were likewise subjected to execution.
