= Amir Alam Khan =

Indian politician

Member of Parliament Rajya Sabha
- In office 2006–2010
- Preceded by: Anil Ambani
- Constituency: Uttar Pradesh

Member of Parliament Lok Sabha
- In office 1999–2004
- Preceded by: Virendra Verma
- Succeeded by: Anuradha Choudhary
- Constituency: Kairana

MLA in Uttar Pradesh Legislative Assembly
- In office 1996–1999
- Preceded by: Jagat Singh
- Succeeded by: Jagat Singh
- Constituency: Thana Bhawan

MLA in Uttar Pradesh Legislative Assembly
- In office 1989–1991
- Preceded by: S. Saiduzzaman
- Succeeded by: Rampal Saini
- Constituency: Morna

MLA in Uttar Pradesh Legislative Assembly
- In office 1985–1989
- Preceded by: Somansh Prakash
- Succeeded by: Nakli Singh
- Constituency: Thana Bhawan

Personal details
- Born: 2 October 1958 (age 67) Garhi Pukta Shamli, Uttar Pradesh, India
- Party: Indian National Congress
- Children: Nawazish Alam Khan

Amir Alam Khan (born 2 October 1958) is an Indian politician. He has served as MLA from Thanabhawan and Morna seat in the UP state assembly. He was a former member of parliament from Uttar Pradesh.

== Personal life ==
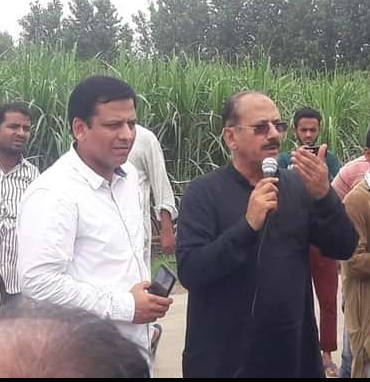

His son, Nawazish Alam Khan, was a Member of Legislative Assembly (MLA) from Budhana assembly in the district Muzaffarnagar from 2012 to 2017.

Lok Sabha
Preceded by Virendra Verma	Member of Parliament for Kairana; 1999–2004	Succeeded by Anuradha Choudhary
Rajya Sabha
Preceded by N/A	Member of Parliament for Rajya Sabha (Uttar Pradesh); 2006–2010	Succeeded by N/A
