= Vijay Kumar Kashyap =

Indian politician (1965–2021)

Vijay Kashyap
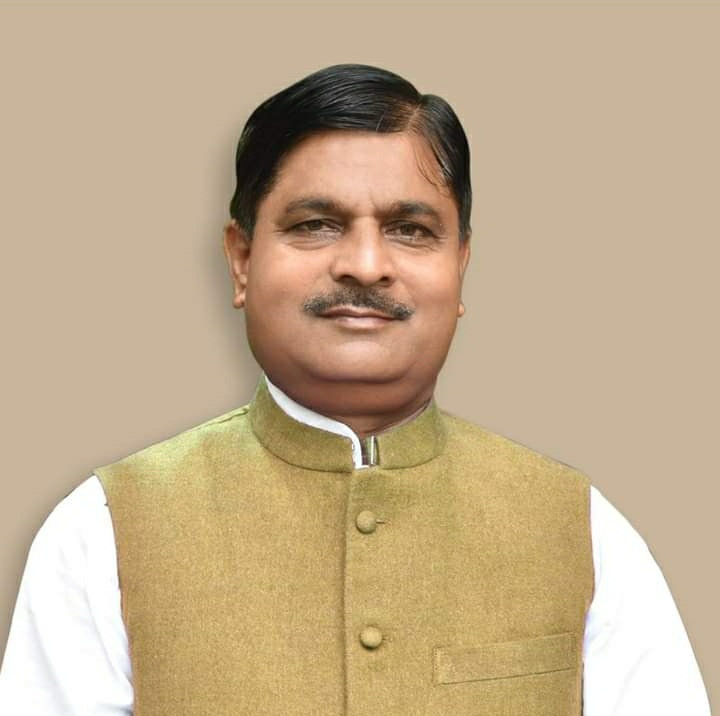
- Vijay Kumar Kashyap

Minister of state for Revenue Government of Uttar Pradesh
- In office 21 August 2019 – 18 May 2021
- Chief Minister: Yogi Adityanath

Member of Uttar Pradesh Legislative Assembly
- In office 2017–2021
- Preceded by: Noor Saleem Rana
- Succeeded by: Pankaj Kumar Malik
- Constituency: Charthawal

Personal details
- Born: 19 February 1965 Muzaffarnagar, Uttar Pradesh, India
- Died: 18 May 2021 (aged 56) Medanta Hospital, Gurgaon
- Resting place: Jeewna
- Party: Bharatiya Janata Party
- Other political affiliations: Vishva Hindu Parishad
- Spouse: Sapna Kashyap
- Relations: Rashtriya Swayamsevak Sangh
- Children: 2
- Parent: Prakash Chandra Kashyap (father)
- Education: CCS University, Meerut
- Occupation: Businessman
- Profession: Politician
- Cabinet: Revenue Minister
- Committees: BJP State Executive Member

Vijay Kumar Kashyap (19 February 1965 – 18 May 2021) was an Indian politician. He served as member of the legislative assembly for Charthawal.

== Biography ==
He belonged to the Bharatiya Janata Party. He was a member of Seventeenth Legislative Assembly of Uttar Pradesh, representing the Charthawal assembly constituency.

He was appointed the minister of state for revenue, and flood control in the Yogi Adityanath cabinet on 21 August 2019.

He died on 18 May 2021, succumbing to COVID-19 aged 52 or 56 (disputed).

=== Primary Education ===
Vijay Kashyap received his early education in Zaidpura village. He completed his high school and intermediate education at Kisan Sevak Inter College in Nanauta. He earned his BA and MA in Political Science from JV Jain Degree College in Saharanpur. Vijay joined the RSS while still a student. In 2004, he built his own house on Deoband Road in Nanauta. He also opened a TVS agency there. However, after failing to achieve the expected success in business, he decided to enter politics to fully serve society.

=== Political Journey ===
Vijay Kashyap served as the district intellectual head of the Sangh in Saharanpur. Kashyap was also a member of the BJP's state executive. In 2007, he received his first ticket from Charthawal. When Vijay Kashyap contested the 2007 assembly elections, the circumstances were not favorable. As a result, he lost the election. Despite widespread opposition, the Bharatiya Janata Party reposed its faith in Vijay Kashyap in the 2012 assembly elections and nominated him again. This time too, Kashyap faced defeat. Despite this, the BJP's top leadership maintained its confidence in him. Despite the presence of several prominent candidates, the party again gave him a ticket for the 2017 assembly elections. This time, he won a landslide victory.
