= Charthawal Assembly constituency =

Constituency of the Uttar Pradesh legislative assembly in India

Charthawal
- Constituency No. 12 for the Uttar Pradesh Legislative Assembly

Constituency details
- Country: India
- Region: North India
- State: Uttar Pradesh
- District: Muzaffarnagar
- Lok Sabha constituency: Muzaffarnagar
- Reservation: None

Member of Legislative Assembly
- 18th Uttar Pradesh Legislative Assembly
- Incumbent Pankaj Kumar Malik
- Party: Samajwadi Party
- Alliance: Indian National Developmental Inclusive Alliance
- Elected year: 2022

Charthawal Assembly constituency is one of the 403 constituencies of the Uttar Pradesh Legislative Assembly, India. It is a part of the Muzaffarnagar district and one of the five assembly constituencies in the Muzaffarnagar Lok Sabha constituency. First election in this assembly constituency was held in 1967 after the "Delimitation Orders (1967)" was passed. From 1967 to 2008, this constituency was reserved for candidates from scheduled caste community. In 2008, after the "Delimitation of Parliamentary and Assembly Constituencies Order, 2008" was passed, this constituency was opened for all candidates.

== Wards / areas ==
Extent of Charthawal Assembly constituency is Baghra, Charthawal, Kutesra, Dhindhawali, PCs Nara, Jarauda, Bahadarpur, Lachheda, Sujru, Bihari, Harsauli, Tawli, Simli, Vahalana, Nirmana, Barwala of Kukra KC & Charthawal NP of Muzaffarnagar Tehsil.

== Members of the Legislative Assembly ==
Year	Member	Party
1967	Harish Chandra	Samyukta Socialist Party
1969	Nain Singh	Bharatiya Kranti Dal
1974	Nand Ram	Bharatiya Kranti Dal
1977	Nand Ram	Janata Party
1980	Ram Prasad	Indian National Congress (I)
1985	Phool Singh	Indian National Congress
1989	G. S. Vinod	Janata Dal
1991	G. S. Vinod	Janata Dal
1993	Randhir Singh	Bharatiya Janata Party
1996	Randhir Singh	Bharatiya Janata Party
2002	Gufran kazmi	Bahujan Samaj Party
2007	Anil Kumar	Bahujan Samaj Party
2012	Noor Saleem Rana	Bahujan Samaj Party
2017	Vijay Kumar Kashyap	Bharatiya Janta Party
2022	Pankaj Kumar Malik	Samajwadi Party

== Election results ==
=== 2027 ===
2027 Uttar Pradesh Legislative Assembly election: Charthawal
Party	Candidate	Votes	%	±%
INDIA				
NDA				
BSP				
NOTA	None of the above			
Majority				
Turnout				
gain from		Swing		

=== 2022 ===
2022 Uttar Pradesh Legislative Assembly election: Charthawal
Party	Candidate	Votes	%	±%
SP	Pankaj Kumar Malik	97,363	43.82	▲15.4
BJP	Sapna Kashyap	92,029	41.42	▲1.78
BSP	Salman Sayeed	25,131	11.31	▼11.74
AIMIM	Tahir Husain Ansari	3,234	1.46	
NOTA	None of the above	878	0.4	▼0.09
Majority		5,334	2.4	▼8.82
Turnout		222,190	67.09	▲1.25
SP gain from BJP		Swing		

=== 2017 ===
2017 Assembly Election: Charthawal
Party	Candidate	Votes	%	±%
BJP	Vijay Kumar Kashyap	82,046	39.64	
SP	Mukesh Chaudhary	58,815	28.42	
BSP	Noor Saleem Rana	47,704	23.05	
RLD	Salman Zaidi	14,442	6.98	
NOTA	None of the above	1,018	0.49	
Majority		23,231	11.22	
Turnout		206,964	65.84	
BJP gain from BSP		Swing		

=== 2012 ===
2012 General Elections:Charthawal
Party	Candidate	Votes	%	±%
BSP	Noor Saleem Rana	53,481	31.02	–
BJP	Vijay Kumar Kashyap	40,775	23.65	–
SP	Mukesh Chaudhary	34,292	19.89	–
INC	S. Saiduzzaman	26,523	15.38	–
Majority		12,706	7.37	–
Turnout		172,399	59.22	–
BSP hold		Swing	–	

== See also ==
- Government of Uttar Pradesh
- Muzaffarnagar Lok Sabha constituency
- List of Vidhan Sabha constituencies of Uttar Pradesh
- Muzaffarnagar district
- Sixteenth Legislative Assembly of Uttar Pradesh
- Uttar Pradesh Legislative Assembly
- Uttar Pradesh
