= Naresh Kumar Baliyan =

Indian politician (1935–2013)

Naresh Kumar Balyan

Member of the Parliament
- In office 1991–1996
- Preceded by: Mufti Mohammad Sayeed
- Succeeded by: Sohanveer Singh
- Constituency: Muzaffarnagar

Personal details
- Born: 2 August 1935 Sisauli, Muzaffarnagar, Uttar Pradesh, India
- Died: 13 March 2013 (aged 77) Muzaffarnagar
- Party: Bharatiya Janata Party
- Spouse: Bhagawati Devi (m. 1954)
- Children: Four sons and one daughter
- Parent: Balwant Singh (father)
- Education: MA, BT in Agra University
- Occupation: Politics and Agriculturist
- Profession: Teacher

Naresh Kumar Baliyan (2 August 1935 – 13 March 2013) was an Indian politician affiliated with the Bharatiya Janata Party. He served as a member of parliament of the Lok Sabha, representing the Muzaffarnagar constituency.

== Early life and education ==
Baliyan was born on August 2, 1935, in Sisauli. He received his Master of Arts (MA) and Bachelor of Teaching (BT) Degree from Agra University.

== Political career ==
Naresh Baliyan was elected to the Lok Sabha in 1991 from the Muzaffarnagar Lok Sabha Seat by defeating Mufti Muhammad Sayeed, a heavyweight politician of Indian Politics. In the 1996 Lok Sabha Election, Baliyan failed to secure a ticket again that ended his political career.
