= Brahma Singh =

Indian Horticultural scientist (born 1941)

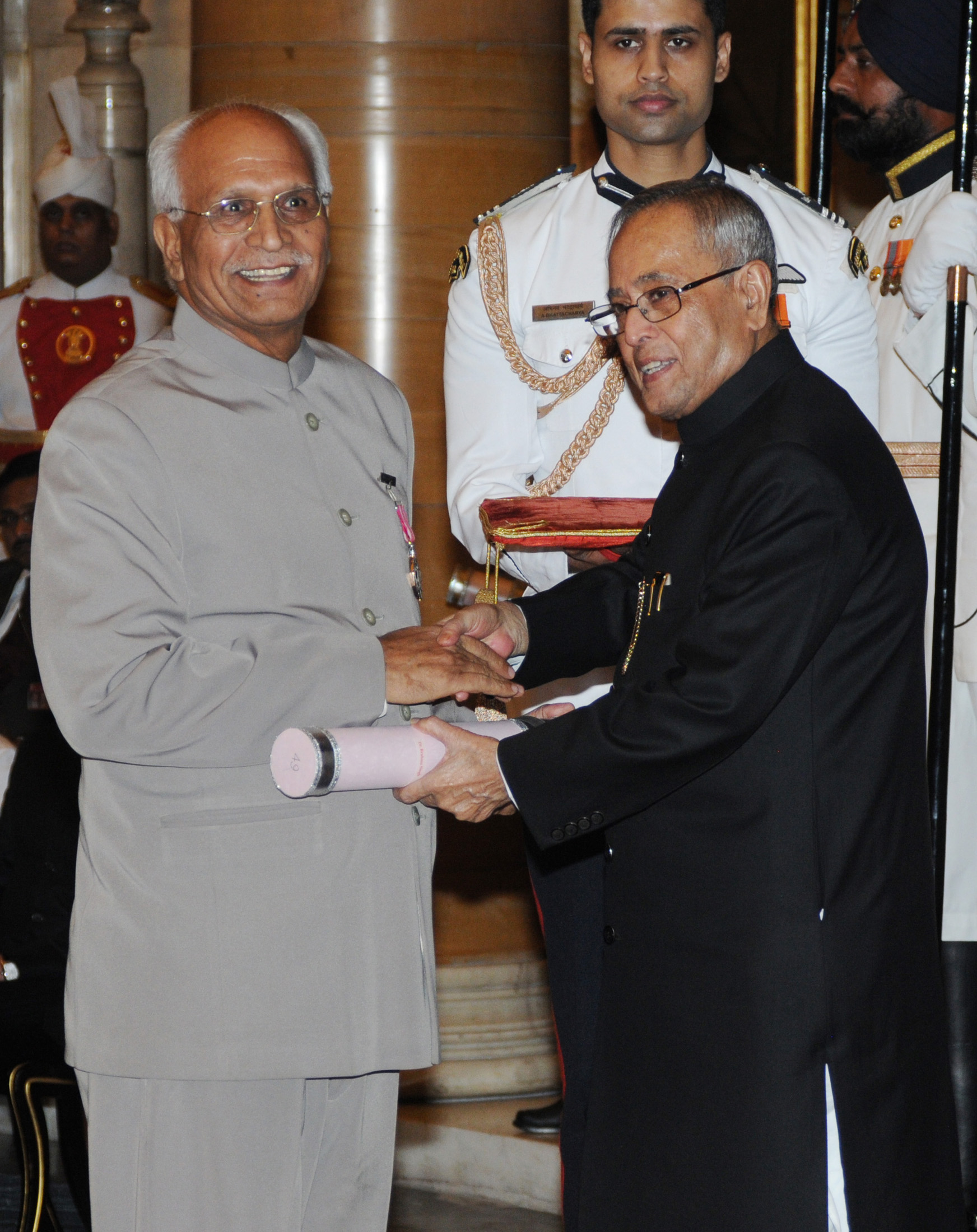
- Born: 15 December 1941 (age 84); Paladi, Muzaffarnagar, Uttar Pradesh, India
- Died: July 9, 2023
- Occupation: Horticultural scientist
- Spouse: Saroj Singh
- Awards: Padma Shri; Horticulture Society of India Fellow; National Academy of Biological Sciences Fellow; National Academy of Agricultural Sciences Fellow; Association of Food Scientists and Technologists (India) Fellow; Indian Society of Vegetable Sciences Fellow; G. B. Pant University Merit; Indira Priyadarshini Vrikshmitra Award; International Plant Scientist Award; AAA Life Time Achievement Award; Shivshakti Life Time Achievement Award

Brahma Singh is an Indian horticultural scientist, known for his expertise on protected cultivation and his efforts in developing agro-technologies for the high altitude areas of the Himalayan region of Leh and for identifying and popularizing the fruit crops of seabuckthorn and Indian mulberry (Noni). The Government of India honoured him, in 2014, by awarding him the Padma Shri, the fourth highest civilian award, for his contributions to the fields of science and technology.

== Biography ==
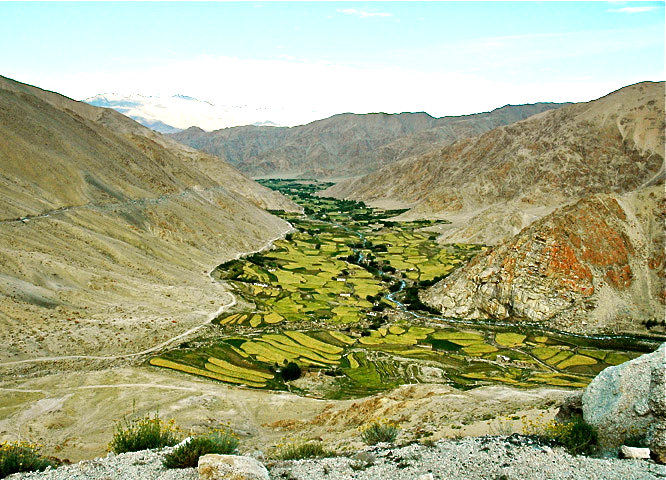
A view of agriculture around Leh.

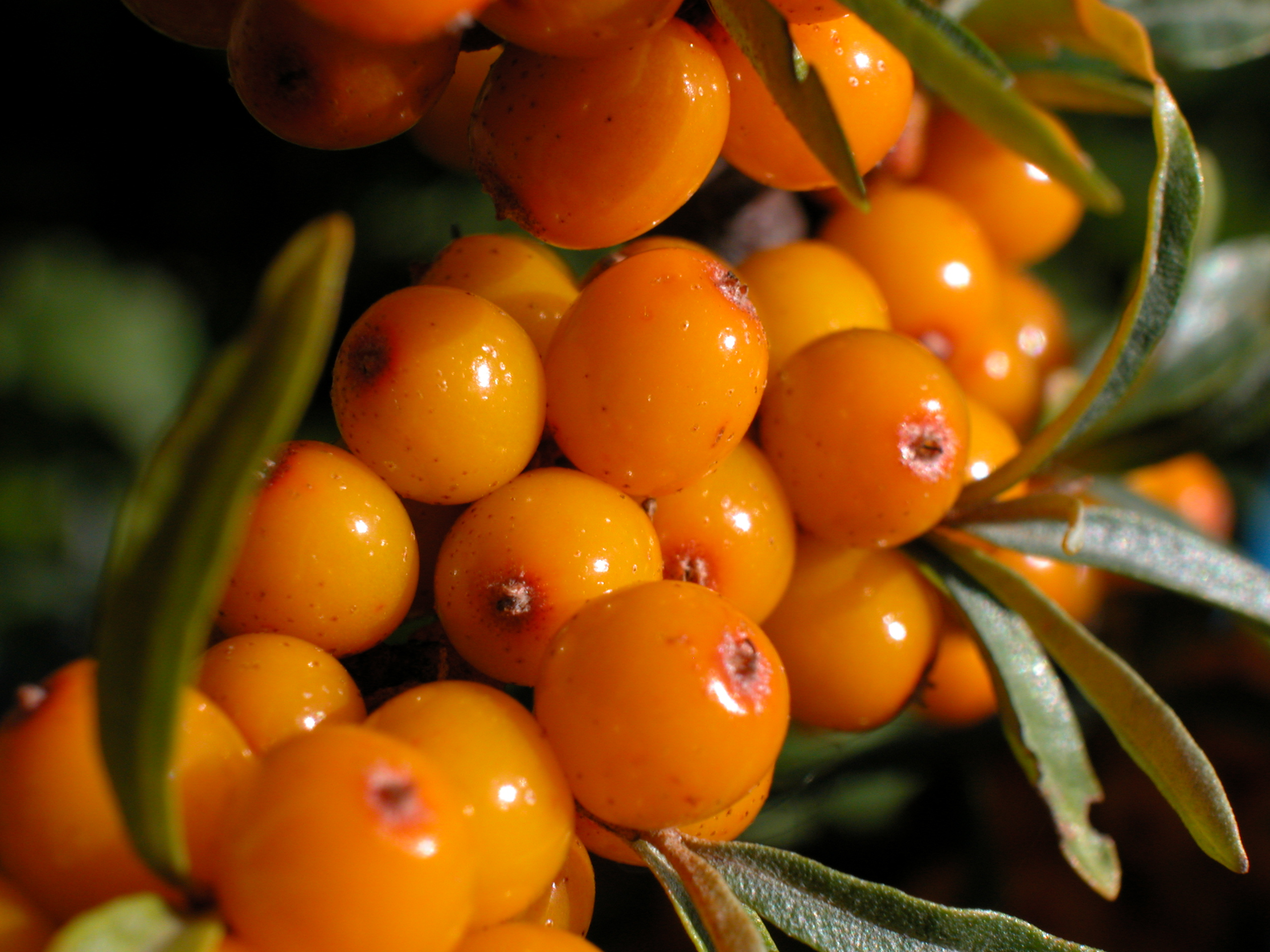
Common Sea-buckthorn

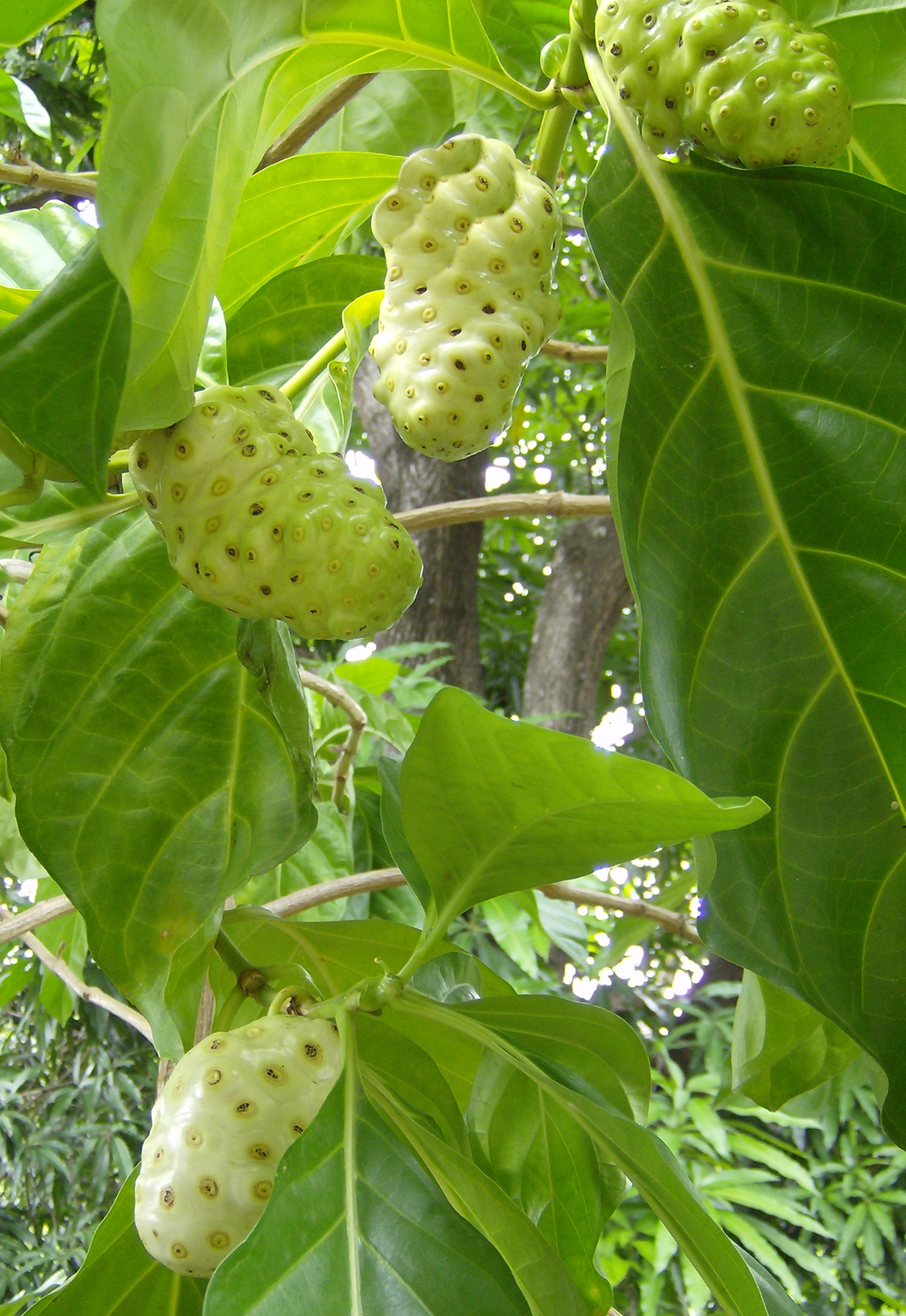
Indian mulberry - Noni fruit (Morinda citrifolia)

Brahma Singh was born at a small hamlet of Paladi in Muzaffarnagar district in the India state of Uttar Pradesh, on 15 December 1941 into a Rajput family. He did his schooling at the Rashtriya High School from where he passed his matriculation in 1959 and completed his junior college in 1961 from the Jat Inter College, Muzaffarnagar in 1961. Singh graduated (BSc Hons) in agriculture and agri-horticulture from the G. B. Pant University of Agriculture and Technology in 1964 and passed MSc from the same university in 1966. Subsequently, he did his doctoral studies at the Indian Agricultural Research Institute, Pantnagar and secured PhD in 1970.

After obtaining the doctoral degree, Singh started his career as an assistant professor at the Chaudhary Charan Singh Haryana Agricultural University, Hisar in 1970 and worked there till 1974, when he joined the Defence Research and Development Organization (DRDO) at their Uttaranchal facility of Defence Agricultural Research Laboratory as the Grade I Senior Scientific Officer. In 1979, he was transferred to the Defence Food Research Laboratory, Mysore with a promotion to the post of the Deputy Director. The next assignment as the Director at the Defence Research Laboratory in Tezpur, Assam, a stint of five years till 1990. This was followed by his transfer to the Field Research Laboratory, Leh in Jammu and Kashmir, as the Director, starting a significant chapter in his career. In 1995, Singh shifted to the DRDO headquarters in Delhi as the Director of the Life Sciences with the additional responsibility of the Secretary of the Life Sciences Research Board till his official retirement from DRDO service in 2001.

In 2002, Singh was elevated to the status of Emeritus Scientist and was placed at the Defence Institute of Physiology and Allied Sciences of DRDO for one year and was appointed the General Manager of the Uttaranchal Seeds and Tarai Development Corporation at for another one-year term. In 2004, Singh moved to the Rashtrapati Bhavan, home to the famous Mughal Gardens, as the Officer on Special Duty (Horticulture) at the President's Secretariat where he worked till 2007. His tenure there also resulted in Dr. Singh publishing two coffee table books, Trees of Rashtrapati Bhavan and Roses of Rashtrapati Bhavan.

Brahma Singh is the advisor of the World Noni Research Foundation based in Chennai. He also holds the Presidency of the Indian Society For Protected Cultivation, New Delhi. He is also the Joint Secretary of ISNS.

Brahma Singh lives in Mayur Vihar in New Delhi.

== Legacy ==
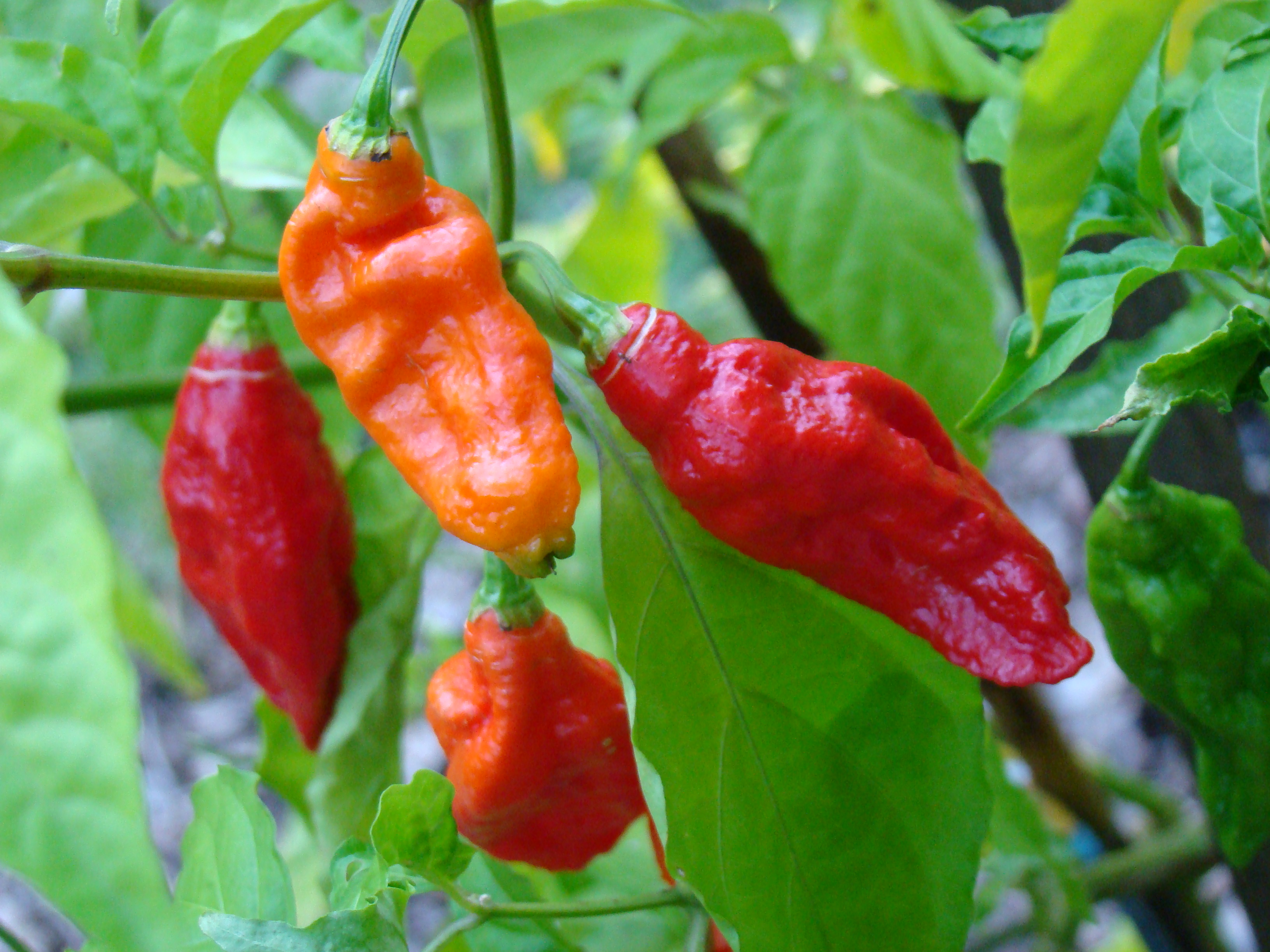
Bhut Jolokia (Capsicum assamensis)

Brahma Singh is known as an expert in protected cultivation and is credited for his efforts in introducing crop cultivation in the high altitude regions of Leh and Nubra. During his tenure as the Director of the Field Research Laboratory at Leh, Dr. Singh is reported to developed have developed vegetable and crop cultivation in the region, thereby earning the accolade as the person who greened Leh which he accomplished by identifying and promoting crops suitable and adaptable to the rarified atmosphere of Leh. Seabuckthorn and Indian mulberry are two such crops identified and popularized by him, the latter known to have many uses in pharmaceutical, cosmetic and nutriceutical industries. He has also contributed towards the development of Leh Berry, a nutraceutical beverage made out of ripe seabuckthorn fruits, and patent of the preparation is held by him. He has since transferred the technology to the local farmers and the industry in reported to be a flourishing one.

Singh introduced many scientific agro techniques by utilizing solar and soil heat to foster cultivation of six vegetables such as potatoes and capsicum in Leh. He is known to have popularized a chilly variety, Bhut Jolokia, (Capsicum assamensis), one of the hottest chilly varieties in the world and his efforts have contributed to develop potato seed production in the Leh valley. He has also been given credit for the establishment of herbal gardens in Leh, the first one in the region, and, later, at the Rashtrapati Bhavan, and also for finding breeding techniques of a variety of tomatoes, resistant to root-knot nematodes.

A major contribution of Singh was his advocacy for the Zaniskari ponies, a local breed of ponies believed to be having more resistance and capabilities on high altitude terrain than the imported ones. The efforts led to the induction of Zanskar ponies into the Indian Army, which are believed to have served the country during the Kargil war. He was also involved in the development of space food for the first Indo-Russian space mission.

Brahma Singh is reported to be the driving force behind the establishment of agricultural research stations in Pithoragarh, Tawang and Partapur. It was through his efforts, Nang village of Ladakh, situated at 13500 ft above the sea level, developed into a self-sustained place. This was achieved by utilizing animal production and cultivation technologies specifically developed for the cold desert climates. Dr. Singh's advice is also reported to have played a part in the establishment of a permafrost facility at Changtang. He has also put in efforts in documenting the flora and fauna of Ladakh region.

Singh, holder of four patents, is credited with 6 books, 81 articles of which 11 are popular articles, 18 abstracts and one scientific paper, his articles published in national and international peer reviewed journals. He has also presented papers at 44 seminars and conferences, edited 6 technical bulletins and has written 7 text book chapters, besides producing two coffee table books on Trees of Rashtrapati Bhavan and the Roses of Rashtrapati Bhavan.

- Seabuckthorn - A Wonder Plant
- Advances in Protected Cultivation
- Brahma Singh (2014). "Society for New Age Herbals". Society for New Age Herbals. Archived from the original on 5 December 2014.

== Positions ==
Brahma Singh, an Emeritus Scientist of DRDO, holds many positions of importance. He is the President of the Indian Society for Protected Cultivation and Society for New Age Herbals, both New Delhi based organizations and World Wellness Forum. He is also an advisor to the World Noni Research Foundation, Chennai, and a member of the Indian Academy of Sciences, Allahabad and Indian Science Congress.

== Awards and recognitions ==
Professor Brahma Singh has been honoured by way of fellowships by many academic and scientific organizations such as Horticulture Society of India, National Academy of Biological Sciences, National Academy of Agricultural Sciences, Association of Food Scientists and Technologists (India) Bio-ved Society and Indian Society of Vegetable Sciences. He is a recipient of G. B. Pant University of Agriculture and Technology Merit in 1964 during his college days, and the Indira Priyadarshini Vrikshmitra Award from the Ministry of Environment and Forests in 1995, In 2002, he received the International Plant Scientist Award from the Academy of Plant Sciences. The Agriculture Alumni Association, Patna Nagar honoured Dr. Singh with the Life Time Achievement Award in 2012 which was followed by the Shivshakti Life Time Achievement Award, in 2013, from the Horticulture Society of India. The Government of India honored Brahma Singh with the Padma Shri by including him in the 2014 Republic Day Honours.

== Publications ==
- A. S. Bawa; Farhath Khanum; Brahma Sngh (2014). "Seabuckthorn, A Wonder Plant" (PDF). NISCAIR.
- Singh, Brahma, Balraj Singh (2014). Advances in Protected Cultivation. New India Publishing Agency. p. 248. ISBN 9789383305179.
- Brahma Singh (2014). "Society for New Age Herbals". Society for New Age Herbals. Archived from the original on 5 December 2014.

== See also ==
- Leh
- G. B. Pant University of Agriculture and Technology
- Indian Agricultural Research Institute
- Defence Research and Development Organization
