= Sairee Chahal =

Indian Entrepreneur

- Born: Muzaffarnagar, Uttar Pradesh, India
- Citizenship: Indian
- Education: Jawaharlal Nehru University (M. Phil); Institute of Management Technology, Ghaziabad (PGDBM)
- Occupations: Founder and CEO of SHEROES, Mahila Money

Sairee Chahal is a technology entrepreneur and the founder and CEO of SHEROES, a platform that supports women entrepreneurs.

== Early life and education ==
Chahal shifted to Delhi from her hometown, Muzaffarnagar, Uttar Pradesh, for studies. She completed her M. Phil in International Studies from Jawaharlal Nehru University. She later obtained a PGDBM (Postgraduate Diploma in Business Management) at the Institute of Management Technology, Ghaziabad. Chahal is also a Cartier Award Alumni and an Aspen Fellow.

== Career ==
=== Early days ===
After graduating from college, Chahal gained her first experience in a start-up. In the year 1999, she got the opportunity to launch a newspaper for mariners. Sairee started working on her venture, Fleximoms, in 2012. Fleximoms helped women avail remote as well as office work opportunities.

=== SHEROES ===
Founded in 2014 as a phone helpline, SHEROES has emerged as a social network dedicated to women. It operates as a large commerce ecosystem working for the betterment of entrepreneurship, employment and finance of women. Users can come on this platform to bridge the gender gap as well as avail interactions, recognition and growth.

=== Mahila Money ===
Founded by Chahal, Mahila Money offers small loans to women micro-entrepreneurs. The financial aid between Rs. 10,000 and Rs. 2,00,000 is provided under this initiative. One can apply for the loan and get approved within 48 hours. Those with rejected applications can stay within the community to learn more about finances and improve their financial stability. The digital platform provides microloans to women entrepreneurs to help with business set-up, business growth and employment opportunities. It focuses on supporting entrepreneurship as well as the financial literacy of women. Mahila Money has also partnered with 60 women-focused organizations to gain more trust in the community.

=== Paytm Payments Bank Ltd ===
In 2019, Paytm Payments Bank appointed Chahal as a member of its board of directors.

=== Milaan Foundation ===
Chahal is part of the board of directors of the Milaan Foundation.

== Awards and honours ==
- Cartier Award
- Femina Achievers Award
- Devi Award
- Most Powerful Women in Indian Business
- Editor’s choice for L’Oreal Femina Women’s Award
