= Sardhana Assembly constituency =

Constituency of the Uttar Pradesh legislative assembly in India

44. Sardhana; ४४. सरधना
- Constituency No. 44 for the Uttar Pradesh Legislative Assembly
- Incumbent MLA Atul Pradhan

Constituency details
- Country: India
- Region: North India
- State: Uttar Pradesh
- District: Meerut
- Lok Sabha constituency: Muzaffarnagar
- Reservation: None

Member of Legislative Assembly
- 18th Uttar Pradesh Legislative Assembly
- Incumbent Atul Pradhan
- Party: Samajwadi party
- Elected year: 2022

Sardhana Assembly constituency is a constituency of the Indian Legislative Assembly, in the Uttar Pradesh region of India.

== Members of Legislative Assembly ==
Year	Member	Party
1957	Ramji Lal Sahayak	Indian National Congress
1957	Faten Singh Rana	Indian National Congress
1962	Ramji Lal Sahayak	Indian National Congress
1967	D. V. Singh	Independent
1969	Jamadar	Indian National Congress
1974	Nazir Ahmad	Bharatiya Kranti Dal
1977	Balvir Singh	Janata Party
1980	Syed Zakiuddin	Indian National Congress (I)
1985	Abdul Wahid Qureshi	Lokdal
1989	Amar Pal Singh	Bharatiya Janata Party
1991	Vijaypal Singh Tomar	Janata Dal
1993	Ravindra Pundir	Bharatiya Janata Party
1996	Ravindra Pundir	Bharatiya Janata Party
2002	Ravindra Pundir	Bharatiya Janata Party
2007	Chandra Veer Singh	Bahujan Samaj Party
2012	Sangeet Singh Som	Bharatiya Janata Party
2017	Sangeet Singh Som	Bharatiya Janata Party
2022	Atul Pradhan	Samajwadi Party

== Election results ==
=== 2027 ===
2027 Uttar Pradesh Legislative Assembly election: Sardhana
Party	Candidate	Votes	%	±%
INDIA				
NDA				
BSP	Vineen Bharala			
NOTA	None of the above			
Majority				
Turnout				
gain from		Swing		

=== 2022 ===
2022 Uttar Pradesh Legislative Assembly election: Sardhana
Party	Candidate	Votes	%	±%
SP	Atul Pradhan	118,573	48.75	▲16.86
BJP	Sangeet Singh Som	100,373	41.27	▲0.34
BSP	Sanjeev Dhama	18,140	7.46	▼16.46
NOTA	None of the above	883	0.36	▼0.1
Majority		18,200	7.48	▼1.56
Turnout		243,206	67.22	▼4.61
SP gain from BJP		Swing	▲8.28	

=== 2017 ===
2017 Uttar Pradesh Legislative Assembly election: Sardhana
Party	Candidate	Votes	%	±%
BJP	Sangeet Singh Som	97,921	40.93	
SP	Atul Pradhan	76,296	31.89	
BSP	Imran Yaqoob Qureshi	57,239	23.92	
RLD	Vakil Chaudhary	3,920	1.64	
NOTA	None of the above	1,087	0.46	
Majority		21,625	9.04	
Turnout		239,251	71.83	
BJP hold		Swing		

=== 2012 ===
2012 Uttar Pradesh Legislative Assembly election:Sardhana
Party	Candidate	Votes	%	±%
BJP	Sangeet Singh Som	62,438	29.09	
RLD	Haji Yaqoob Qureshi	50,164	23.38	
SP	Atul Pradhan	48,023	22.38	
BSP	Chandraveer Singh	44,693	20.83	
Majority		12,274	5.07	
Turnout		296,297	72.04	
BJP hold		Swing		
