= Alam Muzaffarnagari =

Scholar and writer (1901–1969)

Alam Muzaffarnagari (1901–1969), born as Muhammad Ishaaq in Muzaffarnagar, then part of the North-West Provinces of British India, was a poet and writer.

Two collections of his poems (mainly ghazals), titled Salsabil and Kausar o Tasniim, have been published.
