= Noor Saleem Rana =

Indian politician (born 1973)

MLA, 16th Legislative Assembly
- In office March 2012 – March 2017
- Preceded by: Anil Kumar (politician)
- Succeeded by: Vijay Kumar Kashyap
- Constituency: Charthawal

Personal details
- Born: 14 July 1973 (age 52) Village Sujroo, Muzaffarnagar district, Uttar Pradesh, India
- Party: Rashtriya Lok Dal
- Other political affiliations: Bahujan Samaj Party (2009-2021)
- Spouse: Shamia Zeenat
- Children: 4
- Profession: Agriculturist & Politician

Noor Saleem Rana is an Indian politician and member of the Sixteenth Legislative Assembly of Uttar Pradesh. Rana represented the Charthawal constituency of Uttar Pradesh and is a member of the Rashtriya Lok Dal political party.

== Early life and education ==
Noor Saleem Rana was born in Village Sujroo, Muzaffarnagar district, Uttar Pradesh, India on 14 July 1973. His highest attained education is intermediate. Prior to entering politics, he was an agriculturist by profession.

== Political career ==
Noor Saleem Rana has been a MLA for one term. He represented Charthawal Assembly constituency over the symbol of Bahujan Samaj Party. Since 2021, he is associated with Rashtriya Lok Dal.

=== Controversies ===
On 17 January 2017, Rana was booked for violating the electoral code of conduct by setting up political posters in Charthawal without permission.

== Posts held ==
#	From	To	Position	Reference
01	March 2012	March 2017	Member, 16th Legislative Assembly	

== See also ==
- Bahujan Samaj Party
- Politics of India
- Charthawal (Assembly constituency)
- Sixteenth Legislative Assembly of Uttar Pradesh
- Uttar Pradesh Legislative Assembly
