= Umesh Malik =

Indian politician

Late.Umesh Malik

MLA in 17th Legislative Assembly of Uttar Pradesh
- In office March 2017 – March 2022
- Preceded by: Nawazish Alam Khan
- Succeeded by: Rajpal Singh Baliyan
- Constituency: Budhana (Assembly constituency)

Personal details
- Born: Dungar, Budhana, Muzaffarnagar, Uttar Pradesh, India
- Party: Bharatiya Janata Party
- Education: BSc in Meerut University
- Occupation: MLA
- Profession: Politician

Umesh Malik is an Indian politician. He belongs to the Bharatiya Janata Party. He was a member of the Seventeenth Legislative Assembly of Uttar Pradesh representing the Budhana assembly constituency. As of 2022, he is 56 years old and a graduate.

== Political career ==
Umesh Malik has been a member of the 17th Legislative Assembly of Uttar Pradesh. He had represented the Budhana constituency and is a member of the Bhartiya Janata Party. He defeated Samajwadi Party candidate Pramod Tyagi by a margin of 13,201 votes.

== Posts held ==
#	From	To	Position	Comments
01	2017	Incumbent	Member, 17th Legislative Assembly	
