= Kadir Rana =

Indian politician (born 1961)

Member of Parliament, Lok Sabha
- In office 2009-2014
- Preceded by: Munawwar Hasan
- Succeeded by: Sanjeev Balyan
- Constituency: Muzaffarnagar, Uttar Pradesh

Member of Legislative Assembly, Uttar Pradesh
- In office 2007-2009
- Preceded by: Rajpal Singh Saini
- Succeeded by: Mithlesh Pal
- Constituency: Morna

Member of Legislative Council Uttar Pradesh
- In office 1998-2004
- Constituency: Saharanpur

Personal details
- Born: 9 November 1961 (age 64) Sujru, Uttar Pradesh, India
- Party: Samajwadi Party (1993-2004) (2021-Present)
- Other political affiliations: Indian National Congress (2004-2006) Rashtriya Lok Dal (2006-2008) Bahujan Samaj Party (2008-2021)
- Spouse: Sayada Begum
- Children: 6

Kadir Rana is an Indian politician, belonging to Samajwadi Party. In the 2009 election he was elected to the Lok Sabha from the Muzaffarnagar Lok Sabha constituency as a member of the Bahujan Samaj Party.

Kadir Rana was elected to Uttar Pradesh Legislative Council (MLC) in 1998 and later he become MLA from Morna constituency in year 2007.
