= Chaudhary Sardar Singh =

Indian politician

Chaudhary Sardar Singh was an indian politician and leader of Communist Party of India. He was a Member at Uttar Pradesh Vidhan Sabha represented Budhana constituency from 1967 to 1968.
