= Dharamvir Singh Tyagi =

Indian politician (1935–2006)

Member of the Parliament 8th Lok Sabha
- In office 1984–1989
- Preceded by: Ghayoor Ali Khan
- Succeeded by: Mufti Muhammad Sayeed
- Constituency: Muzaffarnagar

Personal details
- Born: 1935
- Died: 2006 (aged 70–71)
- Party: Indian National Congress

Dharamvir Singh Tyagi (1935–2006) was an Indian politician who was a member of the 8th Lok Sabha from Muzaffarnagar constituency in Uttar Pradesh from 1984 to 1989.
