= Kartar Singh Bhadana =

Indian politician (born 1955)

- करतार सिंह भड़ाना

Member of Uttar Pradesh Legislative Assembly
- In office March 2012 – March 2017
- Preceded by: Yograj Singh (politician)
- Succeeded by: Vikram Singh Saini
- Constituency: Khatauli

Member of Haryana Legislative Assembly
- In office 1996–2005
- Preceded by: Hari Singh
- Succeeded by: Bharat Singh
- Constituency: Samalkha

Personal details
- Born: 1 January 1955 (age 71) Faridabad, Punjab, India
- Party: Bhartiya Janata Party (2004-2007) (2024-Present)
- Other political affiliations: Bahujan Samaj Party (2019-2024) Rashtriya Lok Dal (2012-2019) Nationalist Congress Party (2008-2012) Indian National Lok Dal (1999-2004)Haryana Vikas Party (1996-1999)
- Children: Manmohan Bhadana
- Profession: Politician

Kartar Singh Bhadana (Hindi: करतार सिंह भड़ाना) is an Indian politician and is a member of the Bhartiya Janata Party political party.

== Family ==
His father was Nahar Singh and his mother was Ramphali Devi. Avtar Singh Bhadana is his brother. His son Manmohan Bhadana is currently an MLA in the Haryana Legislative Assembly.

== Political career ==
Kartar Singh Bhadana has been a MLA for three terms. For two terms he served the Samalkha Vidhan Sabha Haryana and also as a cooperative minister of Haryana. For one term, he served the Khatauli (Assembly constituency) in Uttar Pradesh.

In 1999, Bhadana played a vital role in the formation of INLD government in the state of Haryana. He was the president of HVP(D) (the breakaway group of 18 MLAs of the Haryana Vikas Party) and supported Om Prakash Chautala as the next chief minister and he became heavyweight cabinet minister in the government.

In 2007, he strongly raised the demand of Gurjar community over the issue of gurjar reservation also known as "The Gurjar Andolan". He took the pledge to not eat a single grain ( अन्न in Hindi) until the government releases all the people put in jail over the issue of andolan and ate only fruits and liquids for approx. 7 months until his demands were fulfilled. In 2024 by-election, he fought from Mangalore Constituency of Uttarakhand and lost to Congress.

== Posts held ==
From	To	Position	Comments
1996	2000	MLA Samalkha, Co-operative Minister	Key player of government
2000	2004	MLA Samalkha, Co-operative Minister	Emerged as big Gurjar leader
Mar-2012	Mar-2017	Member, 16th Legislative Assembly	Worked for Khatauli
