= Budhana Assembly constituency =

Constituency of the Uttar Pradesh legislative assembly in India

Budhana
- Constituency No. 11 for the Uttar Pradesh Legislative Assembly

Constituency details
- Country: India
- Region: North India
- State: Uttar Pradesh
- District: Muzaffarnagar
- Lok Sabha constituency: Muzaffarnagar
- Reservation: None

Member of Legislative Assembly
- 18th Uttar Pradesh Legislative Assembly
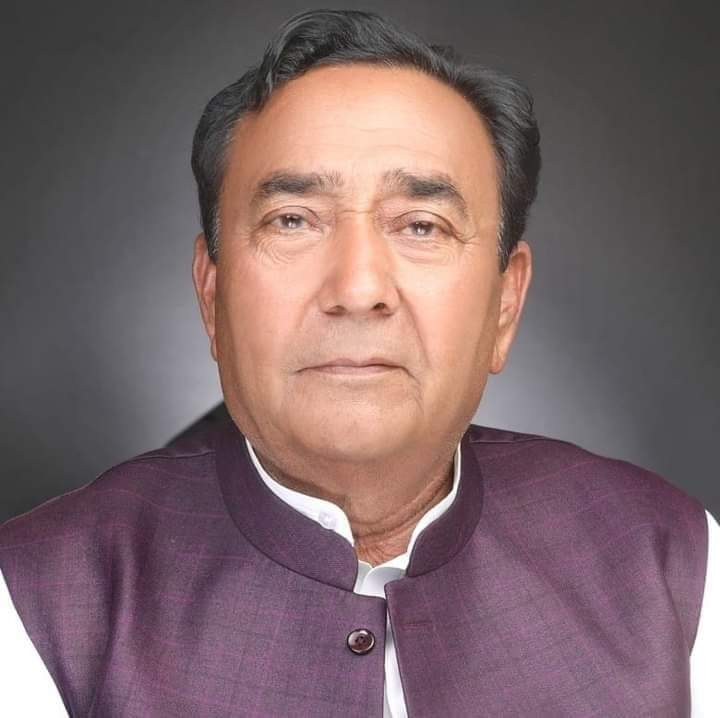
- Incumbent Rajpal Singh Baliyan
- Party: RLD
- Alliance: NDA
- Elected year: 2022
- Preceded by: Umesh Malik

Budhana Assembly constituency is one of the 403 constituencies of the Uttar Pradesh Legislative Assembly, India. It is a part of the Muzaffarnagar district and one of the six assembly constituencies in the Muzaffarnagar Lok Sabha constituency. First elections in this assembly constituency were held in 1957 after the "Final Order DC (1953-1955)" was passed. The constituency ceased to exist in 1967 post "Delimitation Orders (1967)" was passed. In 2008, the assembly constituency was again created during the "Delimitation of Parliamentary and Assembly Constituencies Order, 2008".

== Wards / Areas ==
Extent of Budhana Assembly constituency is Budhana Tehsil (except PCs Nala, Taharpur Bhabisa, Kaniyan, Salfa and Sunna of Budhana KC).

== Members of the Legislative Assembly ==
Year	Member	Party
1957	Kunwar Asghar Ali	Independent
1958^	Kamru	Indian National Congress
1962	Vijaypal Singh	Communist Party of India
1962-2012 : Constituency did not exist
2012	Nawazish Alam Khan	Samajwadi Party
2017	Umesh Malik	Bharatiya Janata Party
2022	Rajpal Singh Baliyan	Rashtriya Lok Dal

== Election results ==
=== 2027 ===
2027 Uttar Pradesh Legislative Assembly election: Budhana
Party	Candidate	Votes	%	±%
INDIA				
RLD	Rajpal Singh Baliyan			
BSP				
NOTA	None of the above			
Majority				
Turnout				
gain from		Swing		

=== 2022 ===
2022 Uttar Pradesh Legislative Assembly election: Budhana
Party	Candidate	Votes	%	±%
RLD	Rajpal Singh Baliyan	131,093	51.28	▲41.44
BJP	Umesh Malik	102,783	40.21	▼0.34
BSP	Anees Alvi	10,397	4.07	▼8.39
AIMIM	Bhim Singh Baliyan	2,633	1.03	
INC	Devendra Kashyap	2,452	0.96	
NOTA	None of the above	1,070	0.42	▼0.12
Majority		28,310	11.07	▲5.6
Turnout		255,624	67.68	▲0.54
RLD gain from BJP		Swing		

=== 2017 ===
2017 Uttar Pradesh Legislative Assembly election: Budhana
Party	Candidate	Votes	%	±%
BJP	Umesh Malik	97,781	40.55	
SP	Pramod Tyagi	84,580	35.08	
BSP	Saeeda Begum	30,034	12.46	
RLD	Yograj Singh	23,732	9.84	
NOTA	None of the above	1,286	0.54	
Majority		13,201	5.47	
Turnout		241,116	67.14	
BJP gain from SP		Swing		

=== 2012 ===
2012 Uttar Pradesh Legislative Assembly election: Budhana
Party	Candidate	Votes	%	±%
SP	Nawazish Alam Khan	68,210	35.45	−
RLD	Rajpal Singh Baliyan	57,622	29.95	−
BSP	Yograj Singh	41,233	21.43	−
BJP	Umesh Malik	15,948	8.29	−
Majority		10,588	5.50	−
Turnout		192,413	58.30	−
SP hold		Swing	-	

=== 1958 ===
1958 Uttar Pradesh Legislative Assembly by election: Budhana
Party	Candidate	Votes	%	±%
INC	Kamru Deen	11,902		−
CPI	Vijai Pal Singh	10,332		−
Independent	Shafquat Jung	9532		−
Majority		1570		−
INC hold		Swing	-	

=== 1957 ===
1957 Uttar Pradesh Legislative Assembly election: Budhana
Party	Candidate	Votes	%	±%
Independent	Kunwar Asghar Ali	32,755	53.32	−
INC	Shri Chand Panwar	28,425	46.48	−
Majority		4300		−
INC hold		Swing	-	

== See also ==
- Government of Uttar Pradesh
- Muzaffarnagar Lok Sabha constituency
- List of Vidhan Sabha constituencies of Uttar Pradesh
- Muzaffarnagar district
- Sixteenth Legislative Assembly of Uttar Pradesh
- Uttar Pradesh Legislative Assembly
- Uttar Pradesh
