= Rajpal Singh Saini =

Indian politician

MP of Rajya Sabha
- In office 5 July 2010 – 4 July 2016
- Constituency: Uttar Pradesh

MLA in 14th Uttar Pradesh Assembly
- In office 2002–2007
- Preceded by: Sanjay Singh Chauhan
- Succeeded by: Kadir Rana
- Constituency: Morna

Personal details
- Born: 1 January 1953 (age 73) Luhsana Village Muzaffarnagar
- Party: Samajwadi Party

Rajpal Singh Saini is a politician from Bharatiya Janata Party and former Member of the Parliament of India representing Uttar Pradesh in the Rajya Sabha, the upper house of the Indian Parliament.

== Early life and education ==
Rajpal Saini was born in Luhsana Muzaffarnagar, Uttar Pradesh in 1953. He holds a BSc. degree from CCS University. Prior to joining politics, he was an agriculturist by profession.
