= Atul Pradhan =

Indian politician

Member of the Uttar Pradesh legislative assembly
- Incumbent
- Assumed office March 2022
- Preceded by: Sangeet Singh Som
- Constituency: Sardhana

Personal details
- Born: 1983 (age 42–43) Gadina Village Meerut, Uttar Pradesh, India
- Party: Samajwadi Party

Atul Pradhan is an Indian politician of the Samajwadi Party. He is a member of the 18th Uttar Pradesh Assembly, representing the Sardhana (Assembly constituency).

== Education and background ==
According to nomination filing, Atul Pradhan has 38 criminal cases and 2.94 crores cash.

== Elections contested ==
Year	Constituency	Party	Result	Votes / Margin
2012	Sardhana	Samajwadi Party	Lost	Came third with 45,000 votes
2017	Sardhana	Samajwadi Party	Lost	
2022	Sardhana	Samajwadi Party	Won	Defeated Sangeet Som by over 18,000 votes
