= Sudhir Kumar Baliyan =

Indian politician

Sudhir Kumar Baliyan is a leader of Bharatiya Janata Party from Uttar Pradesh. He served as cabinet minister in Kalyan Singh ministry. He was a member of Uttar Pradesh Legislative Assembly elected from Khatauli in Muzaffarnagar district.
