= Sujru =

Village in Uttar Pradesh

- Village
- Location within Uttar Pradesh Location within India
- Coordinates: 29°26′46″N 77°41′31″E
- Country: India
- State: Uttar Pradesh
- District: Muzaffarnagar
- Tehsil: Muzaffarnagar

Government
  - Type: Gram Panchayat

Area
  - Total: 7.44 km^{2} (2.87 sq mi)
- Elevation: 248 m (814 ft)

Population (2011)
  - Total: 32,374
  - Density: 4,350/km^{2} (11,300/sq mi)

Languages
  - Common: Hindi
- Time zone: UTC+5:30 (IST)
- PIN: 251003
- STD code: 0131
- Vehicle registration: UP-12

Sujru, also known as Sujroo, is a village in the state of Uttar Pradesh. It is located on the outskirts of Muzaffarnagar, about 3 kilometres south of the city centre. The village had a population of 32,374 as of 2011.

== Geography ==
Sujru is located to the west of the Ganges River, with the National Highway 334 traversing through the village. It occupies an area of 744.22 hectares.

== Demographics ==
In the year 2011, the total population under Sujru was 32,374, in which males formed 52.57% of the total population and females formed 47.43%. Working population took up 27.33% of the total population. The literacy rate was 50.53%, in which 55.92% of the males and 44.57% of the females were literate.
