= Vijaypal Singh Tomar =

Indian politician

Member of Parliament, Rajya Sabha
- In office 3 April 2018 – 3 April 2024
- Preceded by: Kiranmay Nanda, SP
- Constituency: Uttar Pradesh

National President, BJP Kisan Morcha
- In office 3 July 2015 – 15 December 2016
- Preceded by: Om Prakash Dhankar
- Succeeded by: Virendra Singh Mast

Member of Legislative Assembly, Uttar Pradesh
- In office 1993–1996
- Preceded by: Thakur Amar Pal Singh
- Succeeded by: Prof. Ravindra Pundir
- Constituency: Sardhana

Personal details
- Born: 10 September 1951 (age 74) Meerut, Uttar Pradesh, India
- Party: Bharatiya Janata Party

Vijaypal Singh Tomar (born 1951) is an Indian politician from Uttar Pradesh. He is a Member of Parliament in Rajya Sabha till April 2024 and former president of the BJP Kisan Morcha.

== Early life and education ==
Tomar is from Meerut, Uttar Pradesh. He was born into a Tomar Rajput family to Indraj Singh Tomar. He is a science graduate and also did his L.L.B.

== Career ==
Tomar became an MLA for the first time winning the 1991 Uttar Pradesh Legislative Assembly election representing Janata Dal from Sardhana Assembly constituency. In the 1993 Assembly by-election, Ravindra Pundir defeated Tomar, who contested on RLD ticket. In the 2007 Uttar Pradesh Legislative Assembly election, he polled 28,026 votes but lost to BSP candidate Chandra Veer Singh who secured 37,469 votes.
