= Nawazish Alam Khan =

Indian politician (born 1979)

MLA, 16th Legislative Assembly
- In office March 2012 – March 2017
- Preceded by: Kamru Deen
- Succeeded by: Umesh Malik
- Constituency: Budhana

Personal details
- Born: 1 April 1979 (age 47) Muzaffarnagar, Uttar Pradesh, India
- Party: Indian National Congress
- Spouse: Sumbul Khan
- Children: Two (one son & one daughter)
- Parent: Amir Alam Khan (father)
- Education: Chaudhary Charan Singh University
- Profession: Agriculturist, politician

Nawazish Alam Khan is an Indian politician and member of the Sixteenth Legislative Assembly of Uttar Pradesh. Khan represented the Budhana constituency of Uttar Pradesh and is a member of the Indian National Congress political party.

== Early life and education ==
Nawazish Alam Khan was born in Muzaffarnagar, Uttar Pradesh, India in 1979. He holds a Bachelor of Arts degree from Chaudhary Charan Singh University. Prior to joining politics, he was an agriculturist by profession.

== Political career ==
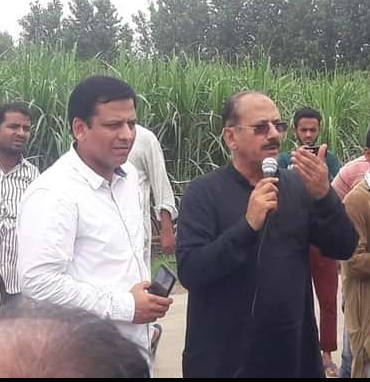

Nawazish Alam Khan was a MLA for one term represented Budhana Assembly constituency. He is the elder son of former MP Shri Amir Alam Khan.

== Posts held ==
#	From	To	Position	Comments
01	2012	2017	Member, 16th Legislative Assembly	

== See also ==
- Samajwadi Party
- Politics of India
- Budhana (Assembly constituency)
- Sixteenth Legislative Assembly of Uttar Pradesh
- Uttar Pradesh Legislative Assembly
