= Sanjeev Balyan =

Indian politician

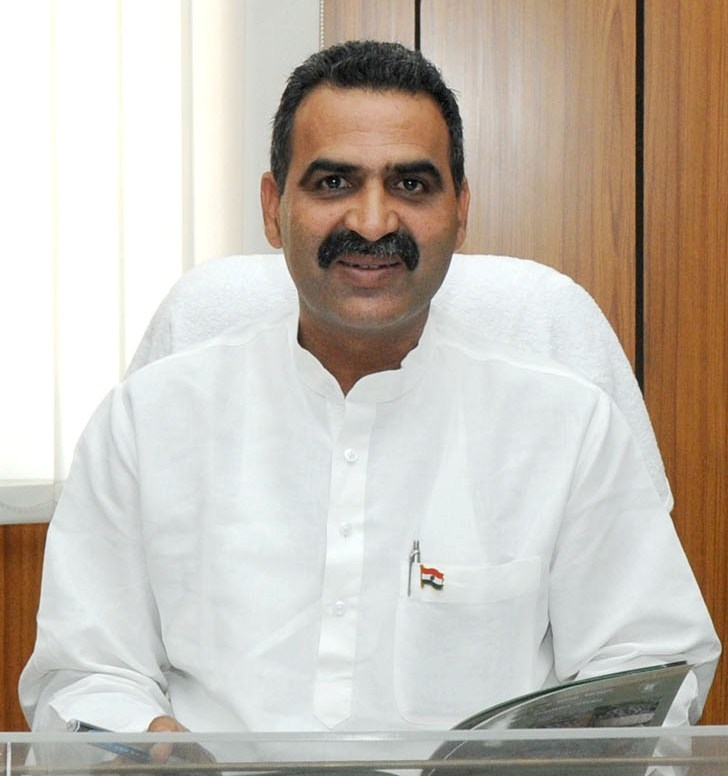

Minister of State for Animal Husbandry, Dairying and Fisheries
- In office 30 May 2019 – 11 June 2024
- Prime Minister: Narendra Modi

Minister of State for Water Resources, River Development and Ganga Rejuvenation
- In office 5 July 2016 – 3 September 2017
- Prime Minister: Narendra Modi
- Preceded by: Sanwar Lal Jat
- Succeeded by: Satya Pal Singh

Minister of State for Agriculture
- In office 26 May 2014 – 5 July 2016
- Prime Minister: Narendra Modi

Minister of State for Food Processing
- In office 26 May 2014 – 9 November 2014
- Prime Minister: Narendra Modi
- Succeeded by: Sadhvi Niranjan Jyoti

Member of Parliament, Lok Sabha
- In office 16 May 2014 – 4 June 2024
- Preceded by: Kadir Rana
- Succeeded by: Harendra Singh Malik
- Constituency: Muzaffarnagar

Personal details
- Born: 23 June 1972 (age 54) Kutbi, Uttar Pradesh, India
- Citizenship: Indian
- Party: Bharatiya Janata Party
- Education: CCS Haryana Agricultural University
- Website: www.drsanjeevbalyan.com

Sanjeev Balyan (born 23 June 1972) is an Indian politician and member of the Bharatiya Janata Party. He has been elected to Lok Sabha from the Muzaffarnagar constituency in 2014 and 2019.

He was appointed as the Minister of State for Agriculture and food processing in the National Democratic Alliance government in May 2014. Then, in July 2016, he was moved to be Minister of State for Water Resources, River Development & Ganga Rejuvenation, under Minister Uma Bharti. He was moved out of the ministry in September 2017 but he again made a comeback in the ministry when he defeated Ajit Singh in a very close contest in the 2019 elections. He is appointed as minister of State for Animal Husbandry, Fisheries and Dairying on 30 May 2019.

He is a veterinarian by qualification and did his Ph.D. in Veterinary Anatomy.

He comes from Kutbi village in Muzaffarnagar district.

== Early life and education ==
He obtained his degrees, including a doctorate in Veterinary Anatomy, from Chaudhary Charan Singh Haryana Agricultural University (CCSHAU), Hisar. During his education in CCSHAU, he was a student leader and was very active in politics. He served in Government of Haryana as an assistant professor and veterinary surgeon.

== Political career ==
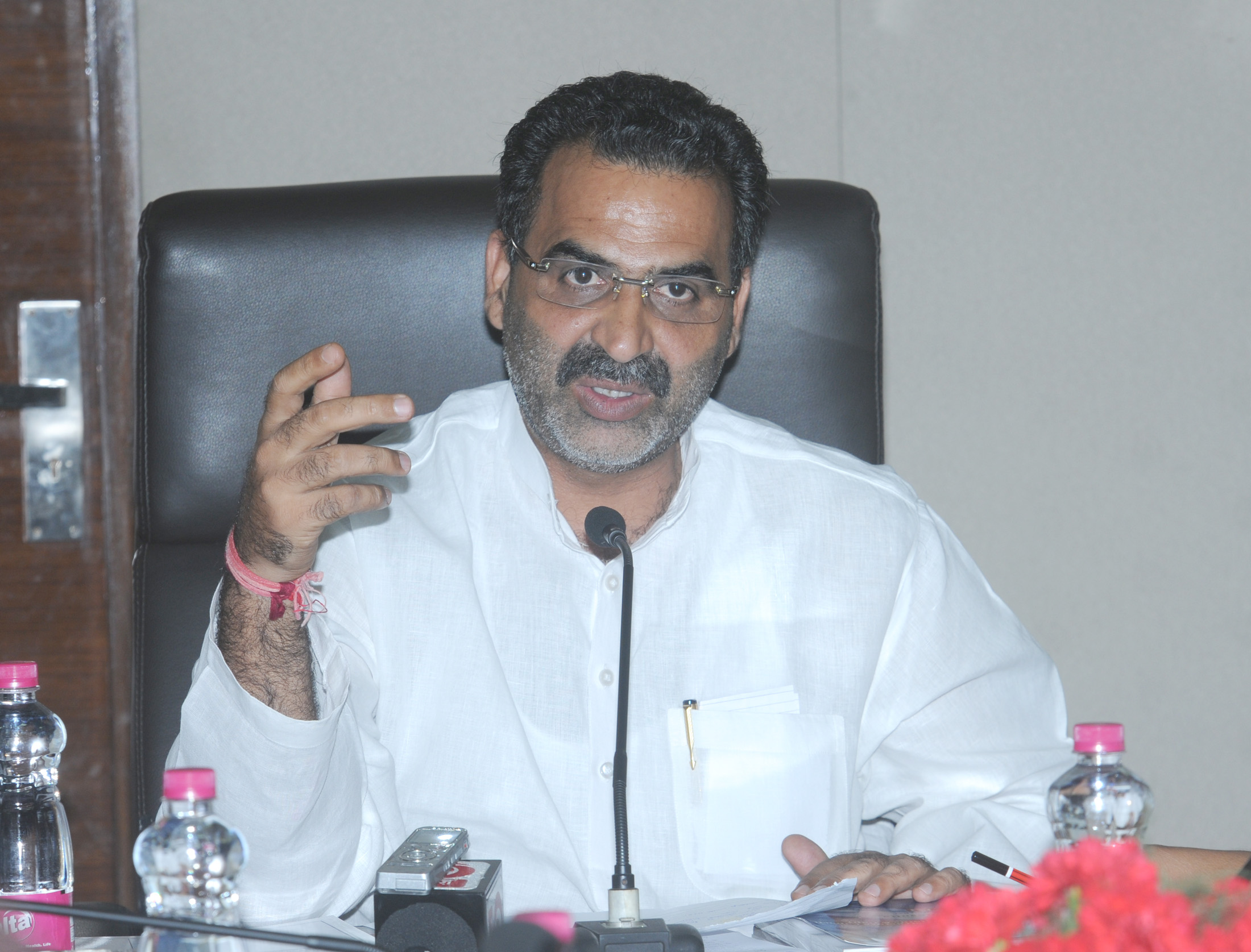
Balyan, as the Minister of State for Agriculture and Farmers Welfare, addressing at the release of study titled “All India Cold-chain Capacity Assessment (Status & Gaps), in New Delhi on 3 September 2015

Balyan got elected as an MP from Muzaffarnagar in 2014 and 2019 Lok Sabha elections. He became the Minister of State for Agriculture and Food Processing in 2014. In 2016, he became Minister of State for Water Resources, River Development, and Ganga Rejuvenation.

He is an accused in the 2013 Muzaffarnagar riots, although he was already in jail as a precautionary measure taken by administration when the riots took place. According to a May 2014 report in The Times of India:

He was part of a mahapanchayat in September 2013 which was held despite prohibitory orders and allegedly inflamed tensions. UP police charged him with violation of prohibitory orders and promoting enmity between two communities.

In November 2015 a bailable warrant was issued against Balyan. Balyan was charged with offences under the Indian Penal Code sections 188 (violating prohibitory orders), 353 (assault or criminal force to deter public servant from discharging his duty) and 341 (wrongful restraint). In December 2015, Balyan surrendered before a Muzaffarnagar court and obtained bail. Balyan has denied his involvement in the riots and has claimed that he has been booked in a false case and accused of doing things he never did.

In May 2019, Balyan became Minister of State for Animal Husbandry, Dairying and Fisheries.
