= Muzaffarnagar =

- City
- Nickname: Sugar Bowl of India
- Location within Uttar Pradesh
- Coordinates: 29°28′03″N 77°42′18″E
- Country: India
- State: Uttar Pradesh
- District: Muzaffarnagar
- First Settled: 1399
- Founded: 1633
- Incorporated as City: 1826
- Founder: Syed Muzaffar Ali Khan
- Named for: Syed Muzaffar Ali Khan

Government
  - Body: Municipal Board of Muzaffarnagar
  - District Magistrate: Umesh Mishra IAS
  - Member of Parliament, Lok Sabha: Harendra Singh Malik (SP)
  - Member of Legislative Assembly: Kapil Dev Agarwal (BJP)

Area
  - Total: 204.8 km^{2} (79.1 sq mi)
- Elevation: 267 m (876 ft)

Population (2011)
  - Total: 494,792
  - Rank: 15 (In U.P.)
  - Density: 2,416/km^{2} (6,257/sq mi)
  - City: 351,838
- Demonym: Muzaffarnagri

Languages
  - Official: Hindi
  - Additional official: Urdu
  - Native: Khariboli
  - Literacy rate: 85.16
- Time zone: UTC+5:30 (IST)
- PIN: 251001
- PIN: 251002
- Telephone code: 0131
- Vehicle registration: UP-12
- First newspaper: Dainik Dehat (est. 1936)
- Website: muzaffarnagar.nic.in

Muzaffarnagar (Hindi pronunciation: [mʊzəfːəɾ.nəgəɾ], also [mʊd͡ʒəp.pʰəɾ.nəgəɾ]) is a city under Muzaffarnagar district in the Indian State of Uttar Pradesh. It is situated midway on the Delhi - Haridwar/Dehradun National Highway (NH 58) and is also well connected with the national railway network. It is known as the sugarbowl of Uttar Pradesh.

The city previously called Sarwat and is located in the middle of the highly fertile upper Ganga-Yamuna Doab region and is very near to New Delhi and Saharanpur, making it one of the most developed and prosperous cities of Uttar Pradesh. It comes under the Saharanpur division. This city is part of Delhi Mumbai Industrial Corridor (DMIC) and Amritsar Delhi Kolkata Industrial Corridor (ADKIC). It shares its border with the state of Uttarakhand and it is the principal commercial, industrial and educational hub of Western Uttar Pradesh.

== History ==
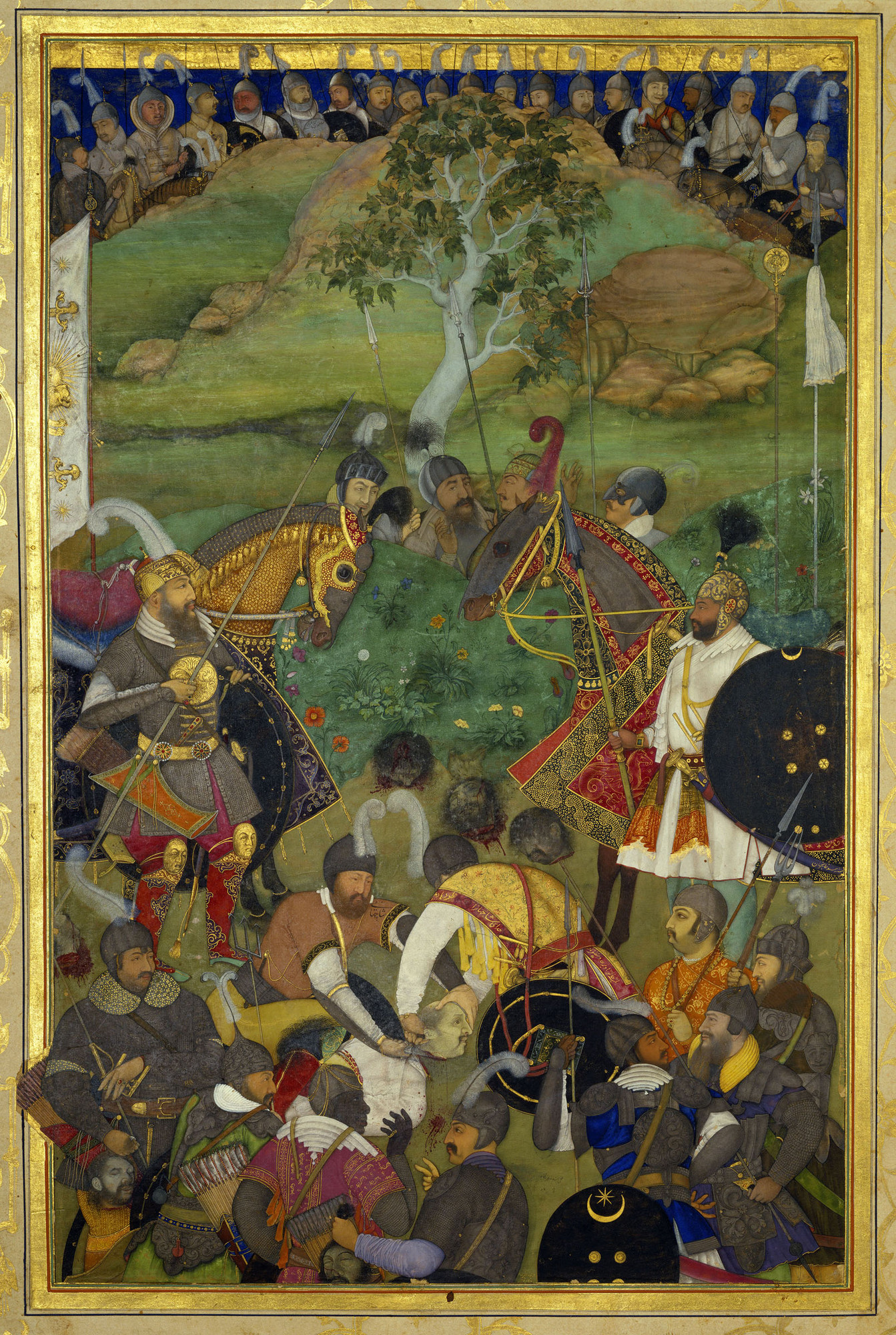
Khan-i Jahan Muzaffar Barha (right) and Sayyid Mian Barha I (left)

The earliest settlers of Muzaffarnagar and the region around it were Brahmins and Rajputs, followed by later migrations of Jat and Gurjar tribes. The town was established in 1633 by the son of a Mughal Commander Sayyid Muzaffar Khan Barha, otherwise known as Khan-i-Jahan, during the reign of Shah Jahan. At the time Muzaffarnagar was part of the Barah country as it was intimately connected with the Indian Muslim kinship group called the Barah Sayyids, who controlled the upper Doab. From Muzaffarnagar, the influential Sayyid brothers became de-facto rulers of the Mughal empire in the 1710s. The Indian Muslim inhabitants of Barha especially from near the town of Jansath were heavily recruited in the Mughal army and in the personal cavalry of the Sayyid Brothers.

In 1901, during the British Raj, it was a district in the Meerut Division in United Provinces of Agra and Oudh. In 1947, when the country got independence Indian flag was hoisted for the first time in the Muzaffarnagar City.

On 18 October 1976, during The Emergency, Prime Minister Indira Gandhi's suspension of democracy in India, between 25 and 30 people protesting against compulsory sterilisation were killed when Uttar Pradesh police fired into the crowd.

=== 2013 Muzaffarnagar riots ===
The 2013 Muzaffarnagar riots between Hindus and Muslims resulted in 62 deaths.

According to a May 2015 report in India Today:

Shamli and adjoining Muzaffarnagar districts are considered sensitive ever since large-scale communal violence erupted in August and September 2013. More than 50 people had died and over 50,000 were rendered homeless ... The riot that ensued had engulfed many districts of western UP.

== Geography ==
=== Topography ===
Muzaffarnagar is 272 meters above sea level in the Doab region of Indo-Gangetic Plain. It is 125 kilometres north east of the national capital, New Delhi, and 200 kilometres south east of Chandigarh, and near to Roorkee, Saharanpur, Meerut and Bijnor.

=== Climate ===
Muzaffarnagar has a monsoon influenced humid subtropical climate characterised by much hot summers and cooler winters. Summers last from early April to late June and are extremely hot. The monsoon arrives in late June and continues until the middle of September. Temperatures drop slightly, with plenty of cloud cover but with higher humidity. Temperatures rise again in October and the city then has a mild, dry winter season from late October to the middle of March. June is the warmest month of the year.

The temperature in June averages 30.2 °C. In January, the average temperature goes to as low as 7 °C. It is the lowest average temperature of the whole year. The average annual temperature in Muzaffarnagar is 24.2 °C. The highest and lowest temperatures ever recorded in Muzaffarnagar are 45 °C (113 °F) on 29 May 1994 and −2.6 °C (27.3 °F) on 23 December 1990 respectively. The rainfall averages 929 mm. The driest month is November, with 8 mm of rain. Highest precipitation falls in July, with an average of 261.4 mm.

According to the World Air Quality Report 2024, Muzaffarnagar is one of the 20 most polluted cities in India.

Climate data for Muzaffarnagar (1991–2020, extremes 1981–2020)
Month	Jan	Feb	Mar	Apr	May	Jun	Jul	Aug	Sep	Oct	Nov	Dec	Year
Record high °C (°F)	28.9 (84.0)	31.5 (88.7)	37.4 (99.3)	42.6 (108.7)	45.0 (113.0)	44.4 (111.9)	42.0 (107.6)	39.0 (102.2)	37.0 (98.6)	35.8 (96.4)	33.1 (91.6)	28.8 (83.8)	45.0 (113.0)
Mean daily maximum °C (°F)	19.0 (66.2)	23.0 (73.4)	28.2 (82.8)	34.8 (94.6)	37.6 (99.7)	36.2 (97.2)	33.2 (91.8)	32.5 (90.5)	32.5 (90.5)	31.1 (88.0)	26.5 (79.7)	21.5 (70.7)	29.7 (85.5)
Mean daily minimum °C (°F)	5.8 (42.4)	8.7 (47.7)	12.9 (55.2)	18.1 (64.6)	22.4 (72.3)	24.3 (75.7)	25.0 (77.0)	24.6 (76.3)	22.6 (72.7)	16.2 (61.2)	10.1 (50.2)	6.3 (43.3)	16.5 (61.7)
Record low °C (°F)	−0.9 (30.4)	1.5 (34.7)	0.0 (32.0)	6.2 (43.2)	11.0 (51.8)	15.4 (59.7)	18.4 (65.1)	17.4 (63.3)	12.6 (54.7)	7.0 (44.6)	2.6 (36.7)	−2.6 (27.3)	−2.6 (27.3)
Average rainfall mm (inches)	20.5 (0.81)	32.2 (1.27)	25.0 (0.98)	13.4 (0.53)	29.2 (1.15)	90.6 (3.57)	232.0 (9.13)	232.5 (9.15)	162.3 (6.39)	21.2 (0.83)	6.4 (0.25)	7.3 (0.29)	872.5 (34.35)
Average rainy days	1.7	2.4	2.2	1.3	2.4	4.4	9.2	9.6	5.7	1.0	0.6	0.7	41.2
Average relative humidity (%) (at 17:30 IST)	58	50	44	32	34	49	70	72	65	52	53	57	53
Source: India Meteorological Department

== Demographics ==
As of the 2011 census, Muzaffar Nagar municipality had a population of 351,838 The municipality had a sex ratio of 897 females per 1,000 males and 12.01% of the population were under six years old. Effective literacy was 85.16%; male literacy was 88.83% and female literacy was 81.05%. The urban/metropolitan population is 494,792, of which 261,338 are males and 233,454 are females.

=== Religion ===
Religion in Muzaffarnagar City (2011)
1. Hinduism (55.8%)
2. Islam (41.4%)
3. Jainism (1.76%)
4. Other (2.00%)

The city has 55.79% Hindus, 41.39% Muslims, 1.7% Jains, 0.67% Sikhs, 0.67% Buddhists and 0.17% Christians

=== Language ===
The Khariboli dialect is the native tongue of the city which resembles the Haryanvi dialect of adjoining Haryana. The official languages of Hindi, Urdu and English are also widely understood.

== Economy ==
Sugar and Muzaffarnagar jaggery production are important industries in the district. As a result of the farming activities around, the city is an important hub of jaggery trading business.

Muzaffarnagar is an industrial city with sugar, steel and paper being the major industries. District Muzaffarnagar has 8 sugar mills. More than 40% of the region's population is engaged in agriculture. According to Economic Research firm Indicus Analytics, Muzaffarnagar has the highest agricultural GDP in Uttar Pradesh, as well as UP's largest granary.

== Healthcare ==
Muzaffaranagar has both public and private healthcare system. The District hospital is the major government hospital in the city along with several general practitioners in the city. The city is also catered by a private medical college (Muzaffarnagar Medical College) on the outskirts of the city.

== Transportation ==
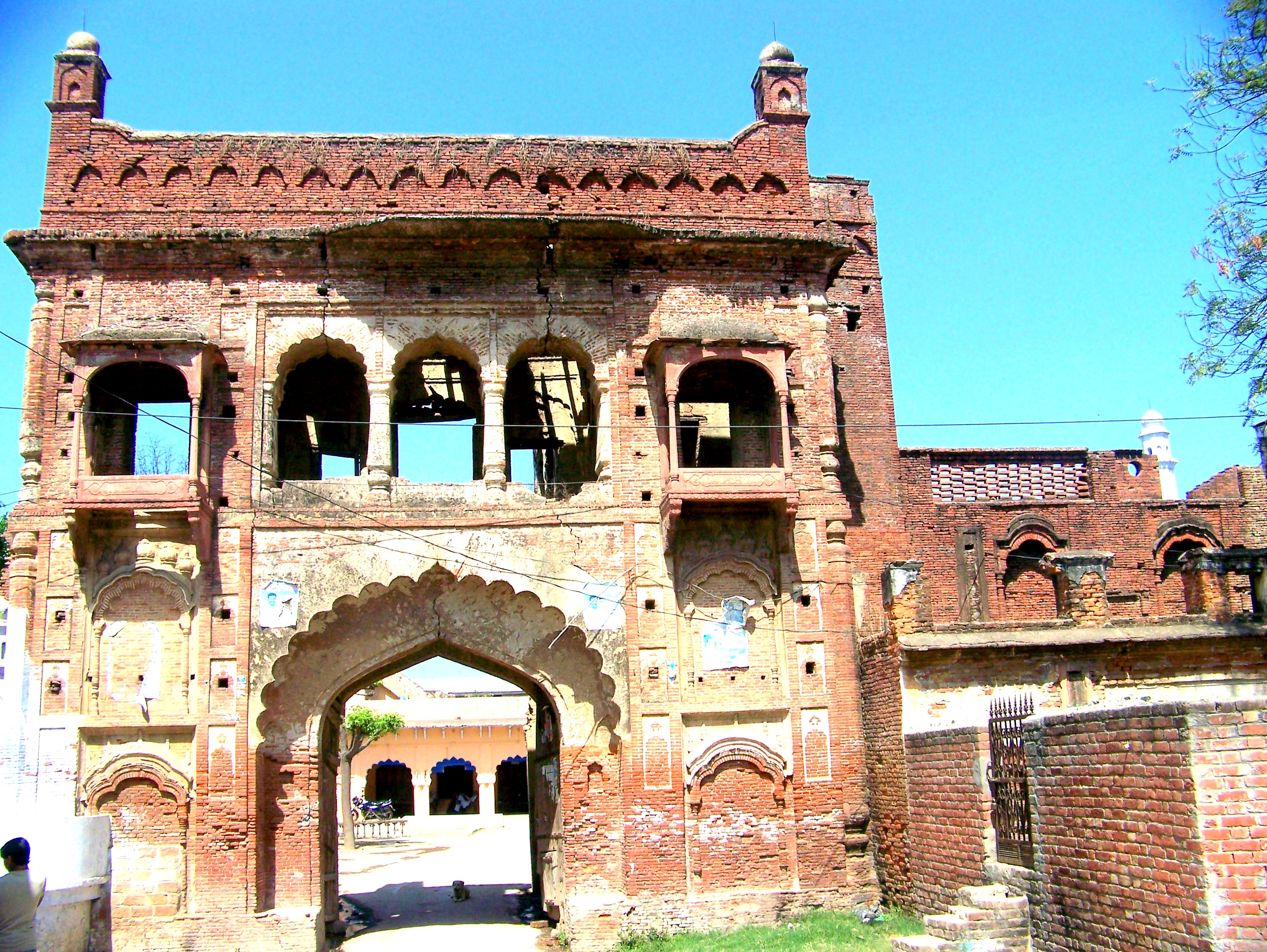
Bada Darwaza in vill. Kakrauli Front Gate

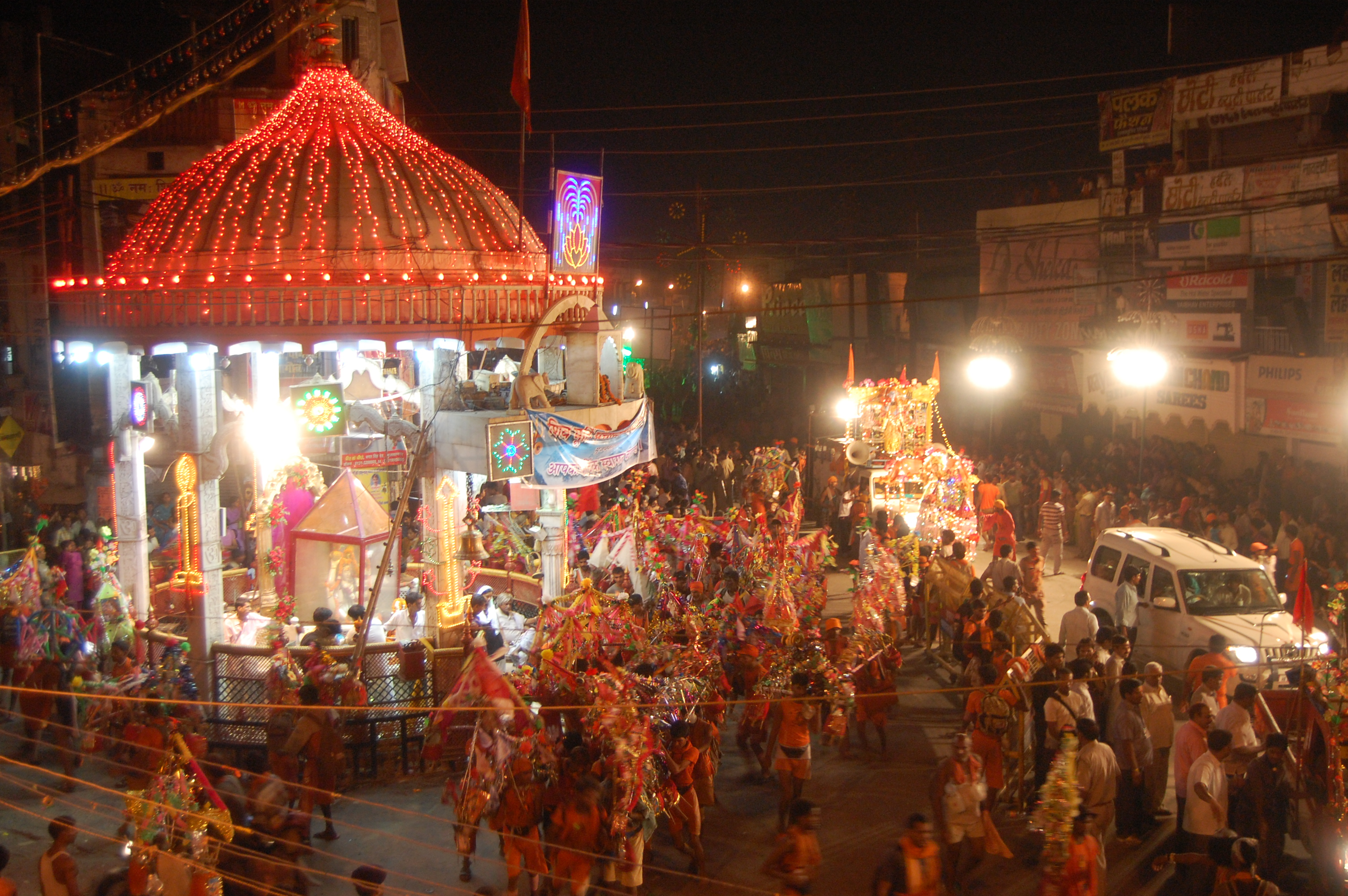
Shiv Chowk

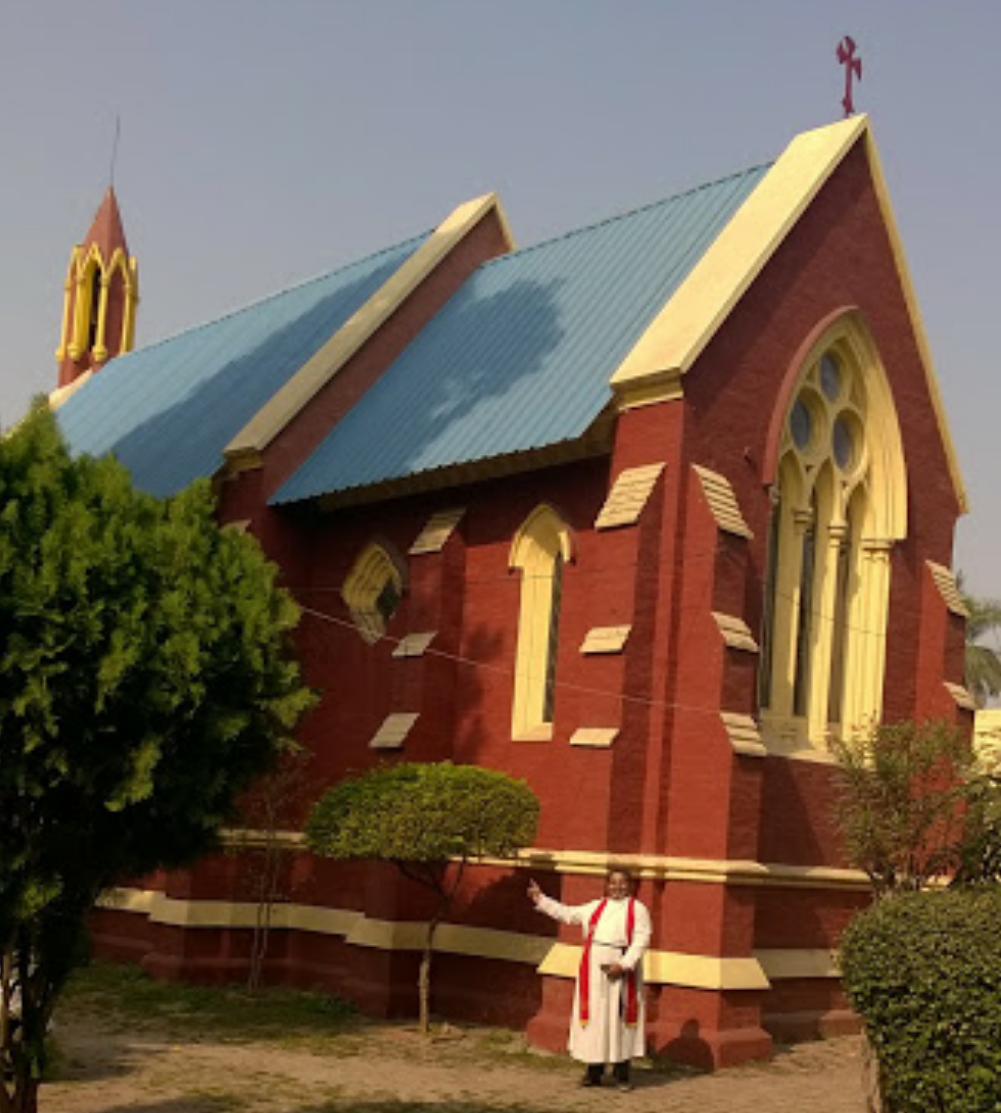
St. John's Church

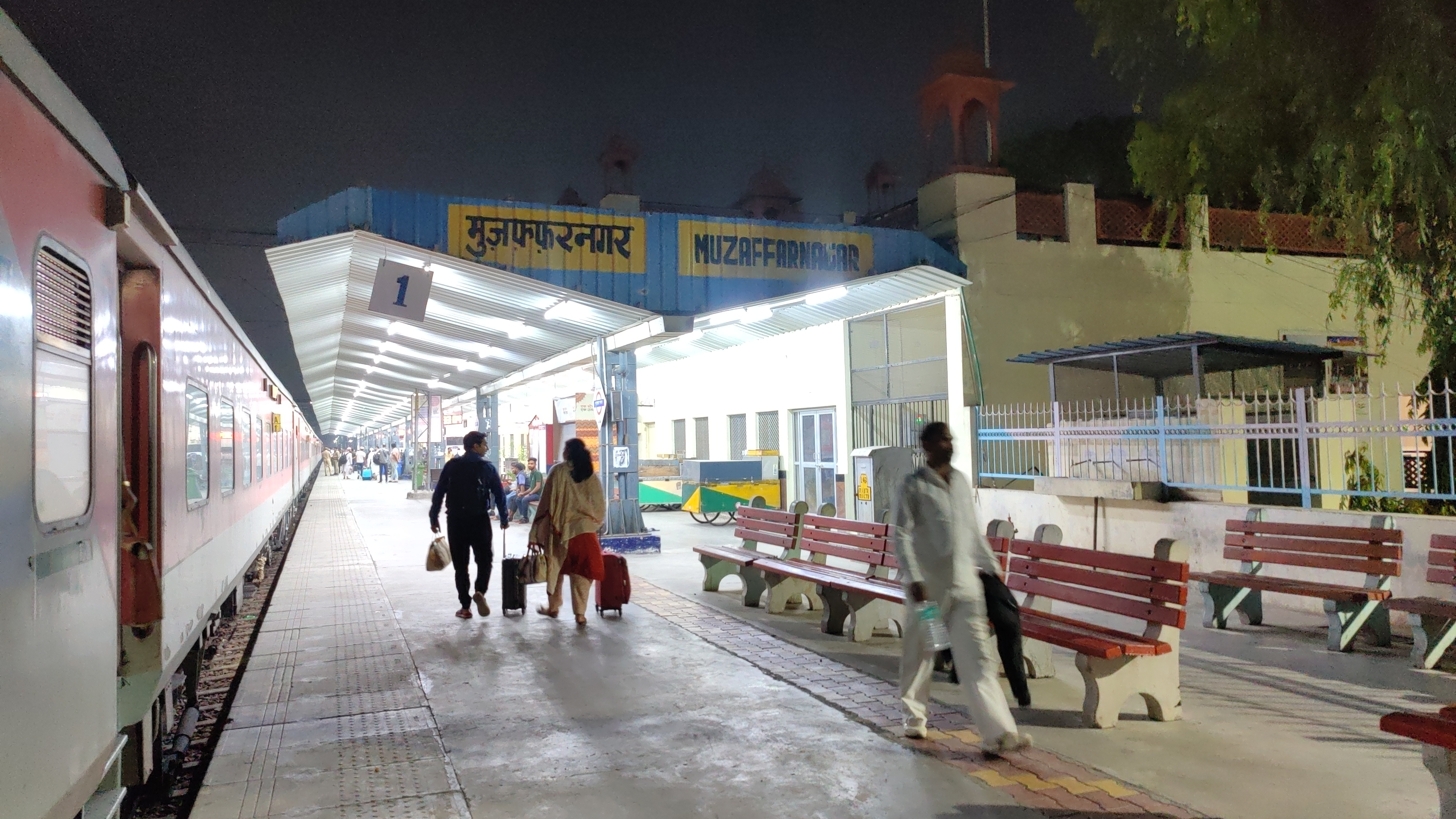
Muzaffarnagar Railway Station from inside

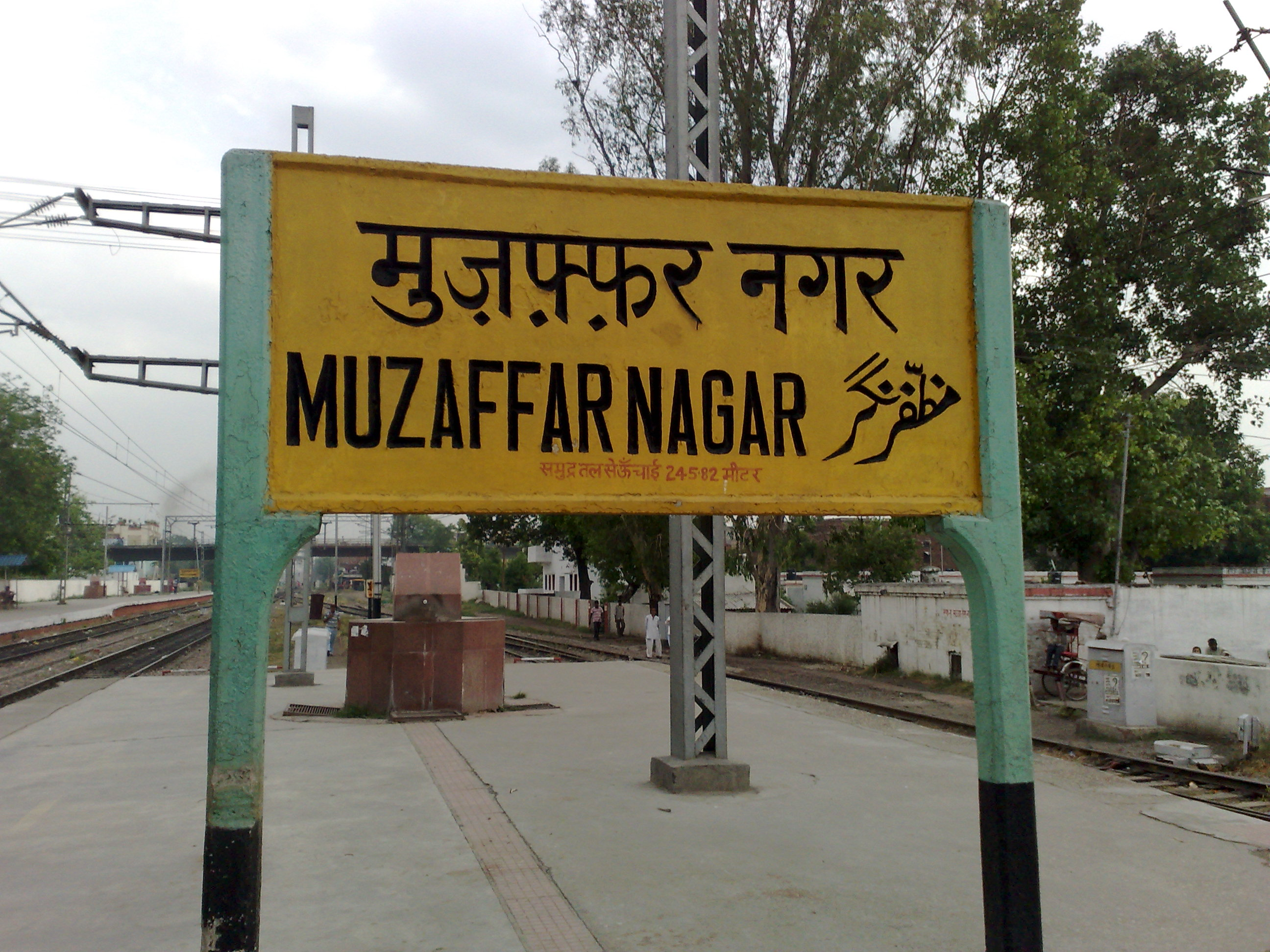
Railway Station

Muzaffarnagar connected by road and railway networks. The Ghaziabad - Saharanpur line passes through the city. Indian Railways provides connections to New Delhi, Western Uttar Pradesh, Jammu & Kashmir, Punjab, South India, and other parts of the country. Dehradun Shatabdi Express and Dehradun Jan Shatabdi Express trains pass through and halt at the Muzaffarnagar station.

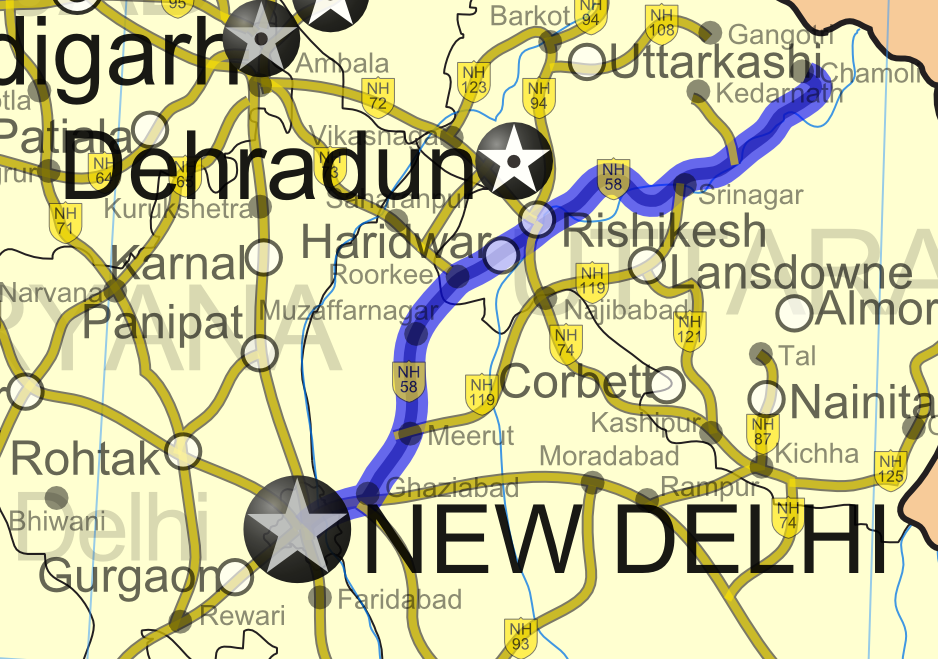
NH-58 passing through M.Nagar

The National Highway - 58 (NH-58) passes through Muzaffarnagar city. This highway provides connections towards Delhi on the southern direction and upper reaches of the Himalayas in the Uttarakhand state in the northern direction. The highway is the backbone of road transportation for the Muzaffarnagar city as well as the Garhwal region of Uttarakhand. Cities and areas of Hardwar, Rishikesh, Dehradun as well as Badrinath and Kedarnath are served by this highway.

City transportation mostly consists of tricycles and 3-wheeled vehicles, rickshaws. An international airport, Muzaffarnagar International Airport, was proposed in the city in order to reduce the traffic at the Indira Gandhi International Airport, however, the same was transferred to the Jewar Airport.

=== Environmental concerns ===
Muzaffarnagar lies approximately halfway on the road from Delhi to Uttarakhand Rishikesh (the NH-58). As a result, many roadside resorts and eateries have sprung up on the highway near the city. Especially, the town of Khatauli is famed for its canal side forest park named "Cheetal". Once visited for the sight of deer and rabbits and other wild animals, the Cheetal is now encroached by privately owned dhabas and resorts thus sidelining the animals.

== Notable people ==
- Kapil Dev Agarwal, politician, MLA from Muzaffarnagar City and state minister in Uttar Pradesh Government.
- Gourav Baliyan, wrestler
- Rajpal Singh Baliyan, political figure, MLA from Budhana Assembly Seat.
- Sanjeev Balyan, politician, former Minister of State for Animal Husbandry, Dairying and Fisheries
- Kartar Singh Bhadana, political figure
- Sairee Chahal – technology entrepreneur and founder of SHEROES; grew up in Muzaffarnagar.
- Kamna Chandra, Haryana film writer
- Sumit Jain, entrepreneur, co-founder & CEO Opentalk.to | co-founder and ex-CEO of Commonfloor.com
- Divya Kakran, wrestler
- Swami Kalyandev (1876–2004), an ascetic in the fields of education and social reform, awarded the Padma Bhushan by the Indian government
- Vijay Kumar Kashyap, politician, Ex-MLA Charthawal and former Minister of State for Revenue, Flood
- Amir Alam Khan, former M.P. and Uttar Pradesh minister, chairman of Bharat groups of colleges
- Liaquat Ali Khan, first Prime Minister of Pakistan (once lived in Muzaffarnagar)
- Nawazish Alam Khan, former MLA from Bhudana Vidhansabha
- Nishu Kumar, Indian professional football player, plays as full back at Kerala Blasters FC and India.
- Harendra Singh Malik, Lok Sabha MP from Muzaffarnagar constituency
- Pankaj Kumar Malik, political figure, MLA from Charthawal Assembly Seat.
- Alam Muzaffarnagari, Indian Urdu writer
- Mithlesh Pal, political figure, MLA from Meerapur(Muzaffarnagar) Assembly Seat falls in Bijnor constituency.
- Vishnu Prabhakar, novelist, writer, journalist
- Sultan Rahi, Pakistani actor
- Kadir Rana, politician, former Lok Sabha MP from Muzaffarnagar constituency
- Shahnawaz Rana, politician, former M.L.A from Bijnor constituency, Uttar pradesh
- Sumit Rathi, Indian football player, plays for ATK and Indian U-17 Football Team
- Rajpal Singh Saini, political figure
- Nawazuddin Siddiqui, Bollywood actor
- Narain Singh, Gurjar leader and deputy chief minister of UP
- Brahma Singh, scientist and agriculturist; awarded the Padma Shri by the Indian government.
- Shaukat Thanvi, Pakistani author who wrote Qazi G
- Rakesh Tikait, Farmer leader
- A. M. Turaz, Indian poet, lyricist, and script writer
