= Tehsils of Muzaffarnagar district =

Muzaffarnagar district of Uttar Pradesh is divided into four tehsils (sub-districts):

Sr. No.	Tehsil Name	Population
1	Muzaffarnagar	4,143,512 (2011)
2	Budhana	82,439 (2015)
3	Jansath	17,782 (2001)
4	Khatauli	72,949 (2011)
