= 2013 Muzaffarnagar riots =

Religious clashes in Uttar Pradesh, India

2013 Muzaffarnagar Riots
- Part of Religious violence in India
- Location of riots
- Date: 27 August 2013 – 17 September 2013
- Location: Muzaffarnagar, Uttar Pradesh, India; 29.36°N 77.83°E
- Caused by: Altercation between Hindu Jats and Muslims at Kawal village, Muzaffarnagar district on 27 August
- Methods: Killing, arson, looting

Parties
| Hindus | Muslims | Unidentified |

Casualties
- Deaths: 62 deaths (20 Hindus & 2 Unidentified)
- Injuries: 93
- Arrested: 200
- Detained: 10,000 detented

The 2013 Muzaffarnagar riots were religious clashes between the Hindus and Muslims in the Muzaffarnagar district of Uttar Pradesh, India. A total of 62 died in the clashes, 42 of whom were Muslims, and 20 Hindu. More than 50,000 people were displaced.

The inciting incident was the killing of a Muslim man by two Hindu cousins, Gaurav and Sachin Singh, on 27 August in the village of Kawal; sources describe the motive as arising from either a traffic altercation or sexual harassment of one of the cousins' relatives. A Muslim mob killed the cousins as they tried to flee. Violence escalated over the following week, fueled in part by a perception that local police were reluctant to apprehend the cousins' killers. On 7 September, a mahapanchayat assembly was called, and was attended by over 100,000 people and politicians from the Bharatiya Janata Party (BJP), the Bharatiya Kisan Union, and the Congress Party; police described the rhetoric at the assembly as inflammatory. Widespread rioting broke out the following day, and the army was brought in to attempt to restore order and to evacuate Muslims to Muslim-majority villages. By 17 September, the curfew was lifted from all riot affected areas and the army was withdrawn. The refugee crisis created by the riots persisted for years afterward.

The riot was described as "the worst violence in Uttar Pradesh in recent history", and was the first time in 20 years the army was deployed in the state. 97 legal cases were launched involving accusations against more than 1,000 people, most of whom were acquitted over the next decade; seven were convicted of the murder of the Singh cousins. The Supreme Court of India, while hearing petitions in relation to the riots, held the Akhilesh Yadav-led Samajwadi Party guilty prima facie of negligence in preventing the violence and ordered it to immediately arrest all those accused irrespective of their political affiliation. The Court also blamed the Central government for its failure to provide intelligence inputs to the Samajwadi Party-governed state government in time to help sound alerts. In 2021, a local court allowed the Yogi Adityanath-led BJP government to withdraw a case of inciting violence against 12 BJP leaders involved in the riots.

In 2022 Vikram Singh Saini, a BJP Member of the Legislative Assembly, and 11 others were sentenced to two years' imprisonment by a special court that convicted them of rioting and other offences.

== Initial clashes ==
On 21 August 2013, communal clashes were reported from Muzaffarnagar and police registered cases against 150 people and 14 persons were taken into custody. Clashes between two communities, Hindus and Muslims, in Shamli and Muzaffarnagar, grew on 27 August 2013. The original cause of the rioting is disputed. In this case, the cause of this rioting alternates between a traffic accident and an eve-teasing incident. According to the first version, the cause was a minor traffic accident involving some youths which then spiralled out of control when it eventually took on religious overtones. In the second version, a girl from the community was allegedly harassed in an eve-teasing incident by one Muslim youth in the village of Kawal. In retaliation, relatives of the girl in question, cousins Sachin Singh and Gaurav Singh, killed the youth named Shahnawaz Qureshi. The two Singhs were lynched by a Muslim mob when they tried to escape. The police arrested eleven members of the girl's family for killing the Muslim youth. According to Zee News report some locals, the police did not act against the killers of the Singhs. According to police records, the Singhs picked a fight with Qureshi over a motorcycle accident. While it has been widely reported that the fight was sparked off when Qureshi harassed the Singhs' cousin sister, the first information report (FIR) about the murder makes no mention of sexual harassment or molestation. According to the other version, the girl who was allegedly harassed by Shahnawaz Qureshi commented that she had not gone to Kawal and did not know anyone named Shahnawaz.

In the FIR registered for Qureshi's death, five people along with Sachin and Gaurav Singh were named as responsible for his death. The reports mentions that the seven men entered Qureshi's home, took him out and killed him with swords and knives; he died on the way to the hospital. In the FIR registers for Sachin and Gaurav Singh's death, seven other men were reported to be responsible; that episode was sparked by an altercation after Gaurav was involved in a bike accident. After news of the killings spread, members of both communities attacked each other. The police took possession of the three dead bodies, and temporarily brought the situation under control. The authorities also deployed Provincial Armed Constabulary personnel to Kawal.

In September 2013, fresh riots sparked off and around 11 people including TV journalist Rajesh Verma were killed and more than 34 were injured after which indefinite curfew was clamped and the army deployed to help maintain law and order.

== Gathering of masses ==
The killings in Kawal village started echoing across the district. On 30 August, two days after the incident, despite a ban on assemblies of crowds, Muslim religious leaders gathered after Friday prayers and local Bahujan Samaj Party (BSP) and Congress leaders had hijacked the Muslim meeting to demand justice for the Kawal incident and made inflammatory speeches. Also, local Bharatiya Janata Party (BJP) leaders allegedly gave an incendiary speech instigating the Hindu farmers on 31 August. A First Information Report (FIR) was lodged against all the leaders. After the meeting, the Jats were attacked and killed on their way home by Muslim assailants with assault rifles and weapons.

Tension was increased by the circulation of a video that purported to show the murder of the Singh cousins but was actually footage of unrelated violence in Pakistan from several years earlier.

By 31 August 2013, five FIRs were registered in connection with the case and eleven people were arrested and booked under various charges, including that of rioting and murder. Police arrested several Bhartiya Janta Party leaders for inciting communal violence including Sangeet Som, Rashtriya Lok Dal leader Dharamvir Baliyan, party's district president Ajit Rathi and ten other political activists when they tried to visit communal violence hit Kawal village of Muzaffarnagar district.

== Mahapanchayat in Nagla Mandaur and ambush at the Jouli canal ==
Clashes between the two communities occurred at low frequencies for the next two weeks. In response to the killing of the Singh cousins, a village council (mahapanchayat) was called in the village of Nagla Mandaur on 7 September under the banner of "Bahu-Beti Bachao" (save our daughters and daughters-in-law), and was attended by more than 100,000 Hindus.The district administration, despite having issued special curfews under Section 144 of the Criminal Procedure Code, allowed the event to go on. Many attendees carried swords or guns. Reviewing footage of the assembly, NDTV described several speeches delivered by BJP politicians as incendiary; Hukum Singh told the crowd that violence committed by minorities was being ignored by the government, and he declared to a journalist that "The purpose of this panchayat is Hindu unity." According to police statements reported by the Indian Express, a few participants in the mahapanchayat captured a man named Insaar Vakeel in the nearby village of Shahpur with the intention of bringing him as a prize to the mahapanchayat; he was killed trying to escape.

That evening, around 2,000 Hindus returning from the assembly were ambushed by a Muslim mob armed with assault rifles and machetes near the village of Jouli. The mobs set fire to 18 tractor trolleys and 3 motorbikes. According to an eyewitness account, the bodies were dumped into a nearby canal. Although six bodies were recovered, it was rumoured that hundreds were missing. Bodies of three Hindus were found at the site of violence and the bodies of three Hindus were fished out from Jauli Canal. Survivors of the Jauli Canal incident added that policemen who were watching the assault did not help the victims, as the police said that "they do not have orders to act". The District Magistrate agreed that many people were missing, but expressed doubt as to whether they had been killed or had fled. Officials placed the death toll as high as 11. At least 30 people were arrested in connection with the riots.

== Riots and army evacuations ==
The canal incident aroused Jats to go on a rampage against Muslims. This led to the riots, which killed 20 Hindu and 42 Muslim people. An eyewitness in Kutba reported that Jat rioters burned down a mosque before attacking homes of Muslims. The casualties occurred before the Army was deployed and a curfew was imposed in Muzaffarnagar and its surrounding Shamli district. On 8 September, the army began evacuating Muslims to Muslim-majority villages such as Bassi Kalan in Shamli.

Approximately 1,000 army troops were deployed and curfew was imposed in the violence-hit areas. 10,000 Provincial Armed Constabulary (PAC) personnel, 1,300 Central Reserve Police Force (CRPF) troopers and 1,200 Rapid Action Force (RAF) personnel were deployed to control the situation. Around 10,000 to 12,000 preventive arrests were made by the police as of 11 September 2013. They cancelled 2,300 arms licenses, seized 2,000 arms, and filed seven cases under the National Security Act.

Even with the curfew and the deployment of the army, the clashes continued for the next three days, with casualties increasing to 62 by 12 September. A state home department official said that 62 people died in Muzaffarnagar, 9 each in Baghpat and Ghaziabad, and five each in Saharanpur and Meerut, two each in Bijnor and Shamli. By 17 September, 42,000 people had been evacuated or otherwise displaced from their homes. Ultimately, approximately 50,000 people were displaced. Some of them took shelter at ten state-run relief camps.

== Sexual violence ==
The first case of gang-rape was registered in the aftermath of the riots from the village of Fugana in Jogiya Kheda. Later two more cases of rape were registered in October. It was reported on 15 November 2013 that a total of 13 rape and sexual harassment cases were registered over the past two months of rioting and the report named 111 people in the incidents but no arrests had been made by that point.

== Aftermath ==
=== Mahapanchayat in Sardhana ===
A Mahapanchayat (grand council) of 40 villages was held in Khera, Sardhana on 29 September 2013 to protest against the Uttar Pradesh government charging the local BJP MLA Sangeet Singh Som under the National Security Act. The crowd became violent when the police began to brandish sticks. The situation turned tense when a rumour spread that a youth injured in police action had died. Crowd set fire police jeeps and other vehicles.

=== Repercussions ===
On 30 October 3 people were killed and 1 injured after a clash between two communities in Mohammadpur Raisingh village of Muzaffarnagar district. Police forces were deployed and an alert was sounded in the entire district. The incident is widely seen as repercussion of the violence in September. On 4 July 2014, a local court has recorded the statement of a witness and deferred until 16 July the hearing in the Kawal killing case here.

=== Return to villages ===
Some Muslims evacuees returned to their homes over the next several months after the riots. As of January 2014, about 15,000 refused to do so out of fear of further violence.

== Investigation ==
Seventeen FIRs have been lodged against leaders including one for the Mahapanchayat (great council) which organised by the Bharatiya Kisan Union leaders. The Uttar Pradesh Government announced a one-member judicial commission composed of Justice Vishnu Sahay, a retired Allahabad High Court judge on 9 September 2013. The commission has been asked to submit a report about the violence within two months. The UP government also removed five senior officials of the police and the administration from Muzaffarnagar for their poor handling of the situation.

=== Misuse of social media ===
Chief Judicial Magistrate issued non-bailable warrants against 16 politicians. On 20 August 2013, BSP MP Kadir Rana was booked for his alleged hate speech in Khalapar area of the city. He was absconding but surrendered on 17 December 2013 and was sent to judicial custody. BJP MLA Sangeet Som was arrested for allegedly uploading a fake video that shows a Muslim mob brutally murdering a Hindu youth and delivering provocative speeches.

=== Sting operation ===
A sting operation done by Headlines Today revealed that UP Cabinet Minister Azam Khan had ordered police officers to release Muslims and not take action against them. Khan denied the claims.

== Convictions ==
In 2022, BJP MLA Vikram Singh Saini along with 11 others were sentenced to two years imprisonment by a special court which convicted them of rioting and other offences. On 9 May 2023, two men were convicted for gang rape of a Muslim woman by a trial court in Muzaffarnagar receiving 20 years of rigorous imprisonment and ₹10,000 fine.

== Response ==
Political parties such as Bahujan Samaj Party, Bharatiya Janata Party, Rashtriya Lok Dal and Muslim organizations including Jamiat Ulama-i-Hind demanded the dismissal of ruling Samajwadi Party government and imposition of President's rule in the state. According to a report in The Caravan, one reason for the hesitation may have been the response to a law and order directive weeks before the riots. Despite a ban on the activities of Vishwa Hindu Parishad, many of the organisations activists' managed to reach Ayodhya for a campaign. Akhilesh's government may have feared a similar undermining of their authority if they tried to ban the meeting of Mahapanchayat.

Home Minister Sushilkumar Shinde informed the press he had already warned the Uttar Pradesh government about the escalating communal tensions there, for which Akhilesh Yadav had promised preventive measures.

Senior Samajwadi Party leader and Minority Welfare Minister Azam Khan was absent from Party's national executive meeting which was held at Agra. He is reportedly unhappy with the manner in which the district administration handled the situation in Muzaffarnagar.

Sompal Shastri, who was a candidate of Samajwadi Party from Baghpat, refused to contest 2014 Loksabha polls.

In a Public Interest Litigation filed by, among others, a reported victim of the violence (Mohammed Haroon), in the Supreme Court, the number of deaths was estimated at more than 200.

== Relief camps ==
State Government has organised relief camps in Muzaffarnagar and Shamli districts for riot victims of 9,000 families, with over 50,000 members. According to district magistrates of Muzaffarnagar and Shamli, 3,500 families comprising over 23,000 members in Muzaffarnagar and 3,000 families consisting of over 15,000 persons are staying in camps in Shamli.

In Muzaffarnagar, there are three relief camps where about 1,000 persons of one community have taken shelter while about 3,200 families of another community are staying in another 2 camps. In Shamli, they are running 14 relief camps where foodgrains, milk, and water are provided to the families.

=== Deaths in camps ===
As of 22 October 2013, the National Human Rights Commission (NHRC), has said that seven deaths have occurred in the Loi relief camp in the aftermath of last month's riots in Muzaffarnagar even as organisers at Malakpur camp in Shamli district admitted that eight babies died at the camp. In Joula camp out of 30 deliveries in the camp three babies had died. In December, Al Jazeera English reported that an additional 30 children had "died due to the harsh cold".

=== Long-term situation ===
Three years after the riots, several nongovernmental organisations estimated that 30,000 displaced Muslims remained in 65 refugee camps, split between Muzaffarnagar and Shamli. The majority of these camps lacked drinking water, street lights, drainage, or public toilets. In the assessment of Harsh Mander and other social activists examining the situation, most refugees felt it was not safe to return to their original homes because of the state's failure to prosecute rioters or to attempt an organised reconciliation process. Many of the refugees, who had previously been agricultural workers, fell into debt bondage working in brick kilns. The report of Mander and others was turned into a book, Living Apart.

== Media portrayals ==
'Muzaffarnagar Baaqi Hai/Muzaffarnagar Eventually', a documentary film by Nakul Singh Sawhney did an in-depth analysis of the riots. The film was screened across 200 Universities in Canada, the US, Europe and India. The filmmaker was attacked by the Hindu nationalist ABVP during the screening of the film at Delhi University. As a result, there were 100s of protest screenings in India a month later. Rohith Vemula, a student of Hyderabad Central University was also penalised for organising the screening of the film that exposed the role of the right-wing Hindu fundamentalists in engineering the riots for electoral dividends in the General elections of 2014 that took place six months after the riots.

The book Living Apart: Communal violence and forced displacement in Muzaffarnagar and Shamli, based on a field report conducted between March and July 2016 by Harsh Mander and others, chronicles the lives of the victims of the Muzaffarnagar riots and reflects on the violence that occurred. The book also offers criticism for the apparent apathy of the state government for the victims.

The novella In The Name of Blasphemy, written by Neeraj Agnihotri, is also set in the backdrop of Muzaffarnagar riots, talking mainly about the suffering and brutality caused by the riots in the name of religion. Joe Sacco's graphic novel The Once and Future Riot depicts the riots and their aftermath.

== Censure and indictment ==
A report composed by a six-member team of the Center for Policy Analysis (a non-profit, known for its advocacy in issues in Indian politics), comprising Harsh Mander, Kamal Chenoy, John Dayal, Seema Mustafa, Sukumar Muralidharan, and E.N. Rammohan, censured members of the Samajwadi Party(SP) and the Bharatiya Janata Party (BJP) for their role in the violence. According to the report, the violence was

seen to be a choreographed spectacle in which the SP and the BJP would create sharp polarisation on communal grounds, compelling the electorate to make a choice between them and squeezing out other parties which have been claiming significant shares of popular vote.

The Justice Vishnu Sahai commission, which made an enquiry into the 2013 Muzaffarnagar riots, blamed members of the SP and the BJP for being involved in the violence. The commission also blamed senior police and administrative officials for errors which led to the escalation of the violence.

On 12 October 2022, BJP MLA Vikram Singh Saini was convicted and sentenced to 2-years in prison in the riots case. Saini along with 11 others were sentenced to two years imprisonment by a special MP/MLA court which convicted them of rioting and other offences and also imposed a fine of Rs 10,000 each.

== See also ==
- Religious harmony in India
- Religious violence in India
- Godhra Train Burning
- List of massacres in India
