= Adampur (disambiguation) =

Adampur is a city and municipal council in Jalandhar district in the Indian state of Punjab.

Adampur may also refer to:

- Adampur, Punjab Assembly constituency
- Adampur Airport, a proposed domestic airport (ICAO: VIAX) to be built at Adampur near Jalandhar
- Adampur, Haryana, a village in Hisar district, Haryana
  - Adampur, Haryana Assembly constituency
- Adampur, Pratapgarh, Uttar Pradesh, a village of Pratapgarh district, Uttar Pradesh
- Adampur, Varanasi, a village in Varanasi tehsil of Varanasi district, Uttar Pradesh

== See also ==
- Adampur Mouchri, a village near the town of Khatauli in Muzaffarnagar district, Uttar Pradesh, India
- Chhawani Adampur, a village in the Bhopal district of Madhya Pradesh, India
