= Kawal =

Kawal may refer to:

== Places ==
- Kawal, Uttar Pradesh, a village in India
- Kawal Wildlife Sanctuary, in Telangana, India

== People ==
- Kawal Rhode, English biomedical engineer
- Kawal Sharma (born 1959), Indian film director
- Kawal (wrestler) (born 1979), American professional wrestler
- Ed Kawal (1909–1960), American football player

== Other uses ==
- Kawal (food), a Sudanese fermented food
