= 2017 Khatauli train derailment =

Train derailment in Uttar Pradesh, India

Khatauli train derailment
- Location within Uttar Pradesh Location within India

Details
- Date: 19 August 2017 around 5:45 pm (IST)
- Location: Khatauli, Muzaffarnagar, Uttar Pradesh
- Coordinates: 29.276°N 77.731°E
- Country: India
- Incident type: Derailment

Statistics
- Trains: 1
- Deaths: 23
- Injured: 156

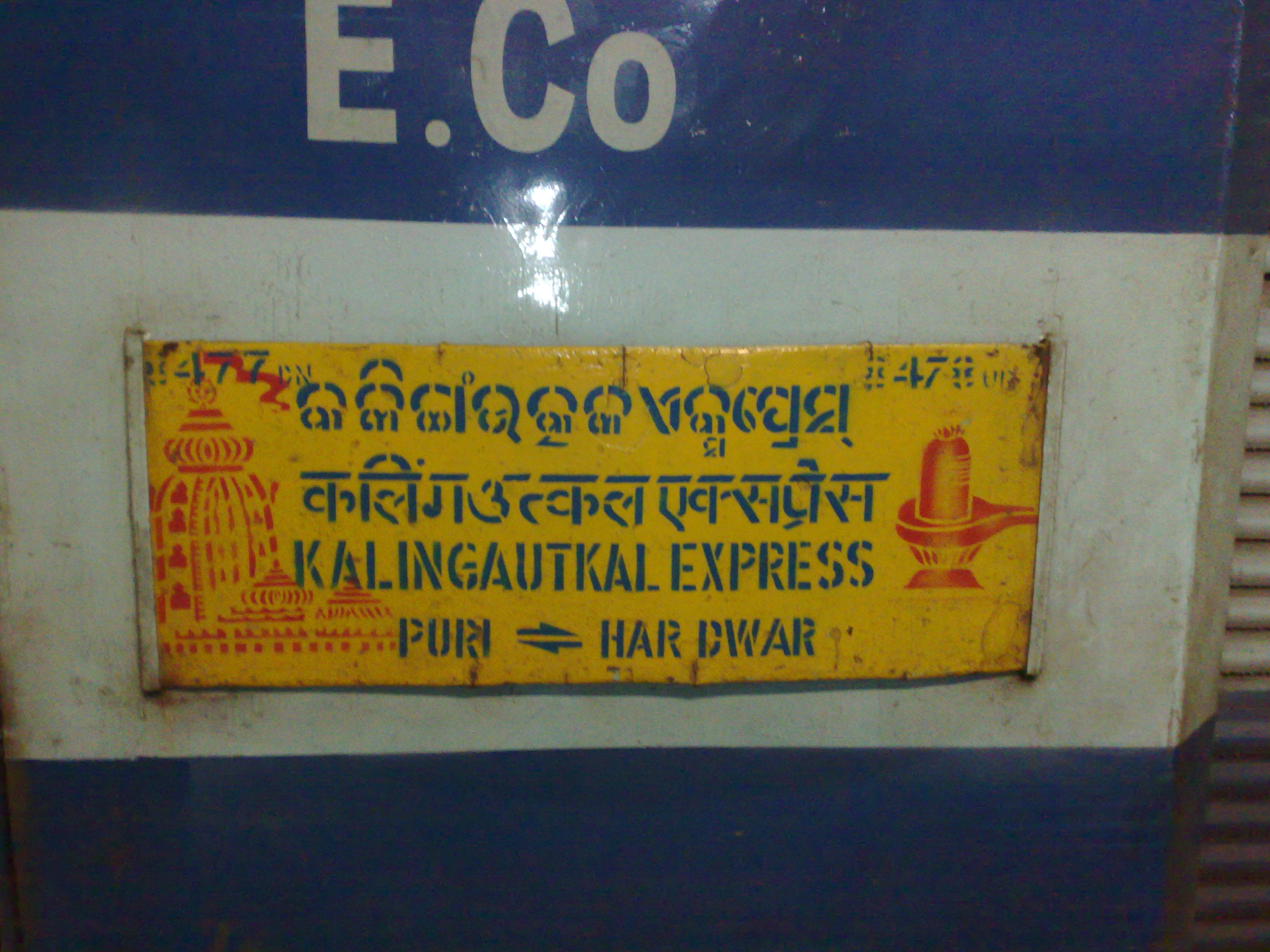
Kalinga Utkal Express

On 19 August 2017, the Kalinga Utkal Express train derailed near Khatauli in Muzaffarnagar district of Uttar Pradesh, India causing fatalities: 23 people were killed and 156 others were injured. This was the fourth major passenger train derailment in 2017 and the third in Uttar Pradesh.

== Accident ==
On 19 August 2017, around 5:45 pm (IST), 14 of the 23 coaches of the Kalinga Utkal Express derailed near Khatauli in the Muzaffarnagar district of Uttar Pradesh. The train was heading from Puri in Odisha to Haridwar in Uttarakhand. The accident occurred because the Haridwar-bound train sped along track that was undergoing repair without being warned beforehand.

Twenty-three people were killed in the accident, according to the Uttar Pradesh police. According to Uttar Pradesh's Minister of Industrial Development Satish Mahana, 174 injured were admitted to different hospitals.

== Aftermath ==
Media footage showed coaches mounted on top of one another, while one carriage crashed into a house beside the track. National Disaster Response Force personnel rushed to the scene to join the rescue operation. Rescuers used metal cutters and cranes to reach inside the damaged coaches.

According to the Indian railway ministry, three trains were cancelled and six were diverted following the accident. The 14521/14522 Ambala-Delhi-Ambala Intercity Express, 18478 Haridwar-Puri Utkal Kalinga Express and the 14682 Jalandhar-New Delhi Intercity Express were cancelled. Meanwhile, the railways also issued some helpline numbers.

== Response ==
India's Railways minister Suresh Prabhu announced an ex-gratia of ₨ 3.5 lakh each to the next of kin of the deceased and ₨ 50,000 for each seriously injured passengers. ₨ 25,000 was announced for passengers with minor injuries.

Indian Prime Minister Narendra Modi expressed his grief over the accident in a series of tweets. He further said, "My thoughts are with the families of the deceased. I wish those injured a speedy recovery. The situation is being monitored very closely by the Railways Ministry. Railways Ministry & UP Government are doing everything possible & providing all assistance required in the wake of the train derailment."

Indian President Ram Nath Kovind said, "Sad at train derailment in UP; my thoughts are with deceased & their families. Injured are being rescued & provided relief."

== See also ==
- Kuneru train derailment
- Pukhrayan train derailment
- Auraiya train derailment
