= Lachhera =

Village in India

Coordinates: 29°24′28″N 77°39′52″E

- Nickname: lachheda
- Motto: Satyameva Jayate
- Interactive map of Lachhera
- Established: 1990

Government
  - Type: Village Panchayat
  - Body: municipal corporation of muffarNagar
  - President or Sarpanch: kuldeep Choudhary
  - Secretary: prem Singh
  - highcandidate: sunil Kashyap

Population
  - Total: 6,183
- government: 311301

Lachhera (or Lacheda) is a village in Muzaffarnagar Tehsil of Muzaffarnagar District in the Indian state of Uttar Pradesh. It belongs to Saharanpur Division. It is located 8 km south side of District headquarters. Its population is estimated to be around 6,000 people.

== Geography ==
Jaroda (2 km), Seemli (3 km), Garhi Durganpur (3 km), Wahalna (3 km), Mirapur (4 km) and Tawali are villages nearby Lachhera. Lachhera is bordered by Baghara Tehsil towards the west, Shahpur Tehsil towards the west, Khatauli Tehsil towards the south, and Charthawal Tehsil towards the north.

Muzaffarnagar, Sardhana, Thana Bhawan, and Shamli are nearby cities.
