= Chitranjan Swaroop =

Indian politician

Chitranjan Swaroop चितरंजन स्वरुप

MLA, 16th Legislative Assembly
- In office March 2012 – 19 August 2015
- Preceded by: Ashok Kumar Kansal
- Succeeded by: Kapil Dev Aggarwal
- Constituency: Muzaffarnagar

MLA, 14th Legislative Assembly
- In office February 2002 – March 2007
- Preceded by: Susheela Agarwal
- Succeeded by: Ashok Kumar Kansal
- Constituency: Muzaffarnagar

MLA, 06th Legislative Assembly
- In office March 1974 – April 1977
- Preceded by: Saeed Murtaza
- Succeeded by: Malti Sharma
- Constituency: Muzaffarnagar

Personal details
- Born: 9 March 1946 Muzaffarnagar district, Uttar Pradesh
- Died: 19 August 2015 (aged 69) Gurgaon, Haryana, India
- Resting place: Muzaffarnagar district, Uttar Pradesh
- Citizenship: India
- Party: Samajwadi Party
- Other political affiliations: Indian National Congress
- Profession: Business, politician

Chitranjan Swaroop (Hindi: चितरंजन स्वरुप; 9 March 1946 – 19 August 2015) was an Indian politician and a member of the 16th Legislative Assembly of Uttar Pradesh of India. He represented the Muzaffarnagar constituency of Uttar Pradesh and was a member of the Samajwadi political party.

== Early life and education ==
Chitranjan Swaroop was born in Muzaffarnagar district, Uttar Pradesh. Swaroop was a graduate. Before being elected as MLA, he used to work as an agriculturist.

== Political career ==
Chitranjan Swaroop was a MLA for three terms. During all three terms, he represented the Muzaffarnagar constituency. Swaroop was earlier a member of the Indian National Congress party and in 1974 (his first term in office) he was a member of the Indian National Congress.

== Death ==
Swaroop died on 19 August 2015 in New Delhi where he was undergoing treatment.

== Posts held ==
#	From	To	Position	Comments
01	1974	1977	Member, 06th Legislative Assembly	
02	2002	2007	Member, 14th Legislative Assembly	
03	2012	2015	Member, 16th Legislative Assembly	

== See also ==
- Muzaffarnagar
- Uttar Pradesh Legislative Assembly
- Government of India
- Politics of India
- Samajwadi Party
- Indian National Congress
