= Vikram Singh Saini =

Indian politician

Vikram Saini

MLA in 18th Uttar Pradesh Assembly
- In office March 2022 – 8 November 2022
- Constituency: Khatauli (Assembly constituency)
- Succeeded by: Madan Bhaiya

MLA in 17th Legislative Assembly of Uttar Pradesh
- In office March 2017 – March 2022
- Preceded by: Kartar Singh Bhadana
- Constituency: Khatauli (Assembly constituency)

Personal details
- Born: Kawal, Uttar Pradesh, India
- Party: Bharatiya Janata Party
- Spouse: Mrs. Rajkumari Saini
- Parent: Hoshyara Saini
- Education: 8th Pass From Rajbala Shiksha Niketan, Kawal, Muzaffarnagar
- Occupation: MLA
- Profession: Politician

Vikram Saini (born 5 June 1969) is an Indian politician. He is a member of the Bharatiya Janata Party, and of the 18th Legislative Assembly of Uttar Pradesh representing the Khatauli assembly constituency. In 2022, he was convicted and sentenced to 2-years in prison in the 2013 Muzaffarnagar riots case.

== Early life and education ==
Saini was born on 5 June 1969 in Kawal, Uttar Pradesh. He received his 8th Pass from Rajbala Shiksha Niketan. At the time of the 2017 election, he listed his occupation as being in agriculture.

== Political career ==
Vikram Saini was formerly the gram pradhan of Kawal. He has been a member of the 17th Legislative Assembly of Uttar Pradesh. Since 2017, he has represented the Khatauli (Assembly constituency) and is a member of the Bhartiya Janata Party. He defeated Samajwadi Party candidate Chandan Singh Chauhan by a margin of 31,374 votes.

== Muzaffarnagar riots ==
Saini appeared in court in 2020 over attempt-to-murder charges against him under the National Security Act relating to the 2013 Muzaffarnagar riots, during which three people died. He had been detained and released in 2014 for his alleged role in the riots.

On 12 October 2022 Vikram Saini was convicted and sentenced to 2-years in prison in the riots case. Saini along with 11 others were sentenced to two years imprisonment by a special MP/MLA court which convicted them of rioting and other offences and also imposed a fine of Rs 10,000 each.

== Political positions ==
=== Cow vigilantism ===
In March 2017 Vikram Saini threatened to break the limbs of anyone who disrespected or killed cows.

=== Extra-judicial violence ===
On 23 October 2017 Saini caused controversy after he addressed people attending a gathering in Muzaffarnagar asking them to physically assault people who harass women.

=== Population control ===
On 5 February 2018 while addressing a gathering on "population control" (Islamophobic), he said Hindus were free to have as many kids as possible until a law is passed, and while they only had two children, "others did not." He also claimed he told his wife to keep having kids until a population control law was passed.

=== Vande Mataram ===
On 4 January 2019 after the Congress government in Madhya Pradesh had said singing Vande Mataram would no longer be mandatory for civil servants, Saini said there should be a law against those "who are against Vande Mataram" and they should be considered 'anti-nationals.' In the same speech he said anyone who is unsafe in India should be considered 'anti-nationals' and, if given a ministry, he would strap bombs to their back and blow them up. He later claimed he said nothing wrong and he was simply using the local language, but Congress leaders said he was "speaking like a terrorist."

=== Nehru family ===
In September 2019 Saini made a derogatory remark on the Nehru family.

=== Article 370 on Kashmir ===
After the government scrapped Article 370 that ensured Kashmir's "special status", on 7 August 2019, Saini addressed party workers saying Kashmiri women have been subject to many atrocities, and that Muslim workers should rejoice since they could now marry 'gori ladki' (white girl) from Kashmir. His comments was widely derided as misogynistic, but Saini stood by his comments saying he said nothing objectionable.

== Posts held ==
#	From	To	Position	Comments
01	March 2017	March 2022	Member, 17th Legislative Assembly	
02	March 2022	November 2022	Member, 18th Uttar Pradesh Assembly	Disqualified
