= Bhayangi =

- Indian Village
- Location in Uttar Pradesh, India Bhayangi (India)
- Coordinates: 29.234°N 77.722°E
- Country: India
- State: Uttar Pradesh
- District: Muzaffarnagar
- Established: 1757
- Founder: Pt. Fattu Sharma

Government
  - Body: Gram panchayat
  - Pradhan: Pt. Mukesh Sharma
  - Chairman: Pt. Omprakash Sharma
- Elevation: 265 m (869 ft)

Population (2020)
  - Total: 2,685

Languages
  - Official: Hindi
- Time zone: UTC+5:30 (IST)
- PIN: 251201
- Telephone code: 01396
- Vehicle registration: UP12

Bhayangi is a small hamlet in Khatauli Tehsil in Muzaffarnagar District of Uttar Pradesh State, India.

== Overview ==
Bhayangi is a small village located on the main G.T.Road (Delhi-Dehradun Highway) near Khatauli bypass. Village Bhayangi is said to have been founded by Bhagmal Singh before 400 Years. It belongs to Uttar Pradesh Division and is located 25 km (16 mi) south of District headquarters Muzaffarnagar.
