= Incholi (disambiguation) =

Incholi may refer to:

- Incholi, a village in Meerut District, India
- Inchauli, a village in Muzaffarnagar District, India

== See also ==
- Ancholi, a neighbourhood of Karachi in Pakistan
