= Inchauli =

Village in Uttar Pradesh, India

Inchauli is a village situated in the Khatauli Mandal of Muzaffarnagar District in Uttar Pradesh, India. The village is 11.7 kilometres from the Mandal headquarters at Khatauli and 23.7 kilometres from the district headquarters at Muzaffarnagar.

Villages nearby include Mandawali Khadar (2.4 km), Samauli (2.6 km), Mandawali Bangar (2.8 km), Majahidpur (3.6 km), and Dabal (3.7 km). Nearby towns include Shahpur (10.3 km), Khatauli (11.7 km), Budhana (13.3 km), and Baghara (21.8 km).
