= Jasoi =

- Village
- Location within Uttar Pradesh
- Country: India
- State: Uttar Pradesh
- District: Muzaffarnagar
- Time zone: UTC+05:30 (IST)
- PIN: 251301

Jasoi is a village situated in the Baghara Mandal of Muzaffarnagar District in Uttar Pradesh, India. It is 8.140 km from the Mandal headquarters at Baghra, and 19.10 km from the district headquarters at Muzaffarnagar. Villages nearby include Gujarheri, Nagala Pithora, Chhetela, Bhamela, Nasirpur, Dholara, and Dholari.

There is a central market in the village and the shops are run by mostly Aggarwal and jangid community.

Being the dominance of Hindus and Muslims communities, the village is very peaceful. The village has a temple dedicated to Shiva called Nageshwar Temple.
