= Auraiya train derailment =

2017 train derailment incident in India

- Location within Uttar Pradesh Location within India

Details
- Date: 23 August 2017; Approx. 02:50 hours (IST)
- Location: Auraiya, Uttar Pradesh
- Coordinates: 26.698743°N 79.411477°E
- Country: India
- Incident type: Derailment

Statistics
- Trains: 1
- Injured: 74

On 23 August 2017, the Kaifiyat Express train derailed between the Pata and Achalda railway stations in Auraiya district of Uttar Pradesh, India, injuring at least 80 people. This was the second train derailment within a week after the Kalinga Utkal Express derailed near Khatauli on 19 August 2017 in the Muzaffarnagar district of Uttar Pradesh.

== Accident ==
The train collided with a dump truck on the line, causing ten coaches of the Kaifiyat Express to derail. At least 80 people were injured, with four in critical condition at the time of the accident. The critical victims were shifted to the Etawah district hospital. The railway administration lodged a complaint against the truck driver and a contractor with a construction company.

== Aftermath ==
National Disaster Response Force (NDRF) personnel were sent to join the rescue operation at the scene and all trains on the route were cancelled until the rescue operations concluded and the track was ready for service.

== Response ==
Railway Minister Suresh Prabhu stated that the injured had been shifted to nearby hospitals. After this accident he offered to resign his ministership, but the sitting prime minister Narendra Modi asked him to wait further.

== See also ==
- Kuneru train derailment
- Pukhrayan train derailment
- 2017 Khatauli train derailment
