= Ashok Kumar Kansal =

Indian politician

MLA, 15th Legislative Assembly
- In office 2007–2012
- Preceded by: Chitranjan Swaroop
- Succeeded by: Chitranjan Swaroop
- Constituency: Muzaffarnagar

Personal details
- Born: 1 August 1958 Muzaffarnagar district, Uttar Pradesh
- Citizenship: India
- Party: Bharatiya Janata Party
- Profession: Business, politician

Ashok Kumar Kansal is an Indian politician and a member of the 15th Legislative Assembly of Uttar Pradesh of India. He represented the Muzaffarnagar constituency of Uttar Pradesh and is a member of the Bharatiya Janata Party.
