= Living Apart =

Book about the 2013 Muzaffarnagar riots

Living Apart: Communal violence and forced displacement in Muzaffarnagar and Shamli is a book describing the violence and the aftermath of the 2013 Muzaffarnagar riots in Uttar Pradesh, India. Written by social activists Harsh Mander, Akram Akhtar Chaudhary, Zafar Eqbal, and Rajanya Bose, it is based on interviews with people who witnessed the violence, and describes the living conditions of such people.

Commenting on the content of the book, Mander has written:

With mounting astonishment and anguish, we discovered as many as 65 refugee colonies, 28 in Muzaffarnagar and 37 in Shamli, housing 29,328 residents, described in our report Living Apart. Even this does not represent the full numbers of people who could never return to the villages of their birth. Uncounted populations bought houses or rented homes in existing Muslim settlements, or permanently migrated out of these districts or even the state. We estimate that the mass communal violence led ultimately to at least 50,000 people permanently expelled from their villages as hate refugees, of which 30,000 we found in these 65 new refugee colonies.

== Reviews ==
=== The Hindu ===
The Hindu describes the book as a "field report" which

[indicts] the State administration for not only failing to rehabilitate riot victims displaced from their homes and villages, but also for actively encouraging Muslim refugees, who used to live in Hindu-majority villages, to resettle in Muslim-majority colonies. The report is based on a survey conducted between March and July 2016 by the NGOs Aman Biradari and Afkar India in 65 resettlement colonies of riot victims in the two districts of Muzaffarnagar and Shamli, housing a total of 29,328 persons.

=== Asian Age ===
A review in The Asian Age states that the book chronicles the apathy of the state government in rehabilitating the victims of the Muzaffarnagar riots. Commenting on the violence that took place, the review quotes from a passage in the book:

A people who had never fought each other in history, suddenly became bitter enemies: estranged, fearful and angry. Not even during the Partition of 1947, did a drop of blood flow in our villages.

=== The Telegraph ===
A review in The Telegraph states that the report aims to draw the attention of the state government to the riots. The review states that, as per the report, some Muslim community organisations, who offered to help to victims would only do so on certain conditions, including "adherence to more orthodox beliefs." The review quotes the report:

Today, a divided population here presents the triumph of communal politics, successfully undoing histories of shared living between Hindus and Muslims in the region over centuries.
