= Khatauli Rural =

- Village
- Location in Muzaffarnagar, Uttar Pradesh, India Khatauli Rural (India)
- Coordinates: 29.270°N 77.726°E
- Country: India
- State: Uttar Pradesh
- District: Muzaffarnagar

Area
  - Total: 5 km^{2} (1.9 sq mi)

Population (2011)
  - Total: 2,961
  - Density: 590/km^{2} (1,500/sq mi)

Languages
  - Official: Hindi
- Time zone: UTC+5:30 (IST)
- Postal code: 251203
- Vehicle registration: UP 12

Khatauli Rural is a census town in Muzaffarnagar district in the Indian state of Uttar Pradesh.

== Demographics ==
As of the 2001 India census, Jeewna had a population of 10,737. Males constitute 53% of the population and females 47%. Jeewna has an average literacy rate of 48%, lower than the national average of 59.5%: male literacy is 57%, and female literacy is 37%. In Jeewna, 21% of the population is under six years of age.
