= Muzaffarnagar Assembly constituency =

Constituency of the Uttar Pradesh legislative assembly in India

Muzaffarnagar
- Constituency No. 14 for the Uttar Pradesh Legislative Assembly

Constituency details
- Country: India
- Region: North India
- State: Uttar Pradesh
- District: Muzaffarnagar
- Lok Sabha constituency: Muzaffarnagar
- Reservation: None

Member of Legislative Assembly
- 18th Uttar Pradesh Legislative Assembly
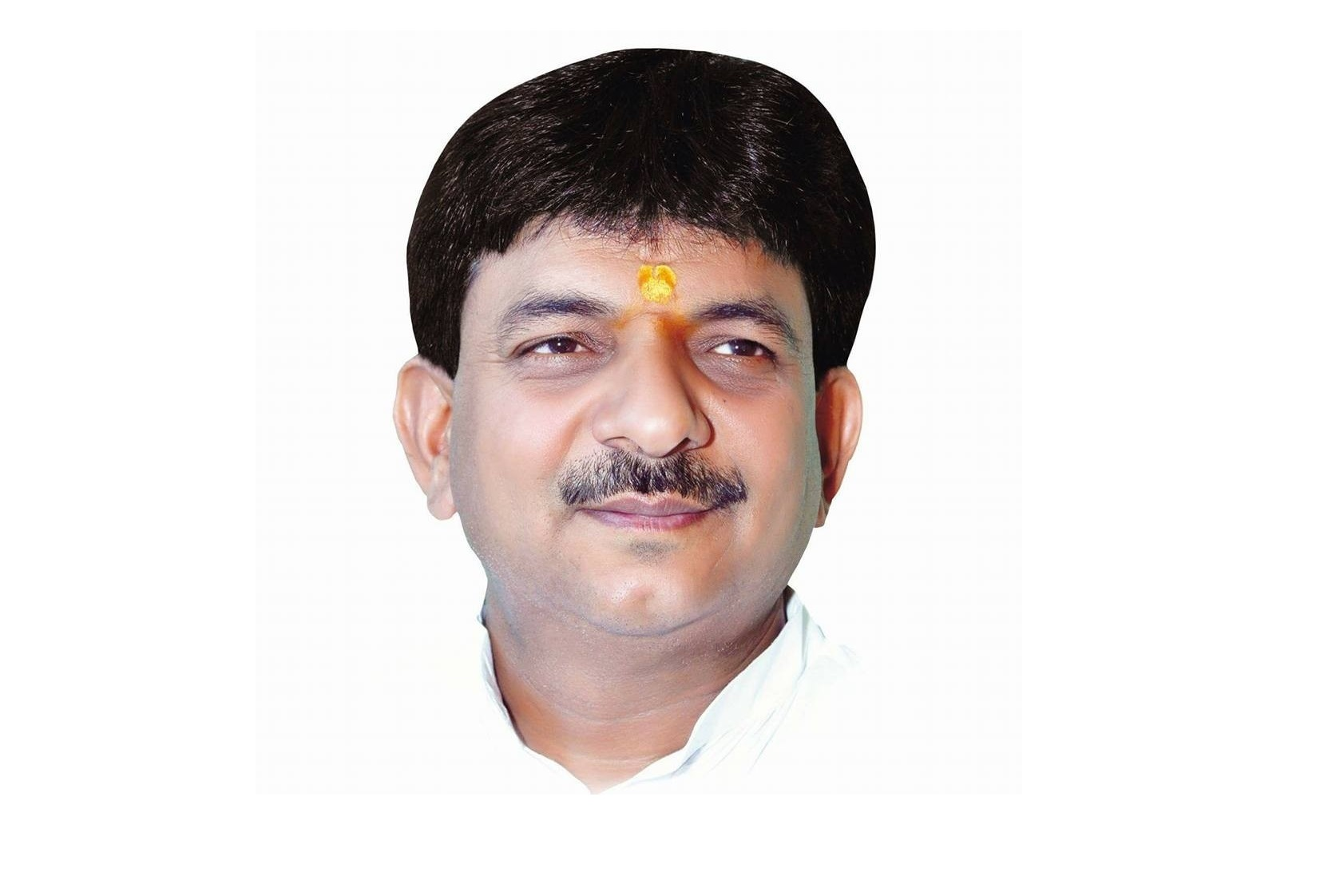
- Incumbent Kapil Dev Aggarwal
- Party: BJP
- Alliance: NDA
- Elected year: 2022
- Preceded by: Chitranjan Swaroop, SP

Muzaffarnagar Assembly constituency is one of the 403 constituencies of the Uttar Pradesh Legislative Assembly, India. It is a part of the Muzaffarnagar district and one of the five assembly constituencies in the Muzaffarnagar Lok Sabha constituency. First election in this assembly constituency was held in 1951 after the "Delimitation Order" (DPACO-1951) was passed in 1951. In 2008, after the "Delimitation of Parliamentary and Assembly Constituencies Order, 2008" was passed, this constituency was assigned identification number 14.

== Wards and areas ==
Extent of Muzaffarnagar Assembly constituency is PCs Bilaspur, Jatmunjhera, Makhiyali, Shernagar, Dhandhera, Bhandoora of Kukra KC & Muzaffarnagar NPP of Muzaffarnagar Tehsil.

== Members of the Legislative Assembly ==
Year	Member	Party
1952	Dwaraka Prasad Mittal	Indian National Congress
1957	Dwaraka Prasad Mittal	Indian National Congress
1962	Keshav Gupta	Indian National Congress
1967	Vishnu Swaroop	Independent
1969	Saeed Murtaza	Bharatiya Kranti Dal
1974	Chitranjan Swaroop	Indian National Congress
1977	Malti Sharma	Janata Party
1980	Vidya Bhushan	Indian National Congress (I)
1985	Charushila	Indian National Congress
1989	Somansh Prakash	Janata Dal
1991	Suresh Sangal	Bhartiya Janata Party
1993	Suresh Sangal	Bhartiya Janata Party
1996	Susheela Aggarwal	Bhartiya Janata Party
2002	Chitranjan Swaroop	Samajwadi Party
2007	Ashok Kumar Kansal	Bhartiya Janata Party
2012	Chitranjan Swaroop	Samajwadi Party
2015^	Kapil Dev Agarwal	Bharatiya Janata Party
2017	Kapil Dev Agarwal	Bharatiya Janata Party
2022	Kapil Dev Agarwal	Bharatiya Janata Party

== Election results ==
=== 2027 ===
2027 Uttar Pradesh Legislative Assembly election: Muzaffarnagar
Party	Candidate	Votes	%	±%
NDA				
INDIA				
BSP				
NOTA	None of the above			
Majority				
Turnout				
gain from		Swing		

=== 2022 ===
2022 Uttar Pradesh Legislative Assembly election: Muzaffarnagar
Party	Candidate	Votes	%	±%
BJP	'Kapil Dev Aggarwal'	111,794	49.57	▲4.19
RLD	Saurabh Swaroop Bansal	93,100	41.28	▲38.66
BSP	Puspankar Deepak	10,733	4.76	▼5.0
AIMIM	Intezar Ansari	3,750	1.66	
NOTA	None of the above	675	0.3	▼0.23
Majority		18,694	8.29	▲3.32
Turnout		225,543	62.89	▼1.6
BJP hold		Swing	-	

=== 2017 ===
U. P. Legislative Assembly Election, 2017: Muzaffarnagar
Party	Candidate	Votes	%	±%
BJP	'Kapil Dev Aggarwal'	97,838	45.38	
SP	Gaurav Swaroop Bansal	87,134	40.41	
BSP	Rakesh Kumar Sharma	21,038	9.76	
RLD	Payal Maheshwari	5,640	2.62	
NOTA	None of the above	1,133	0.53	
Majority		10,704	4.97	
Turnout		215,602	64.49	
BJP hold		Swing		

=== 2015 ===
U. P. Legislative Assembly By Election, 2015: Muzaffarnagar
Party	Candidate	Votes	%	±%
BJP	Kapil Dev Aggarwal	65,378	42.05	
SP	Gaurav Swaroop Bansal	58,026	37.32	
RLD	Mithlesh Pal	14,673	9.44	
INC	Salman Sayeed	10,561	6.79	
PECP	Mohammad Najar	1,722	1.11	
NOTA	None of the Above	387	0.25	
Majority		7,352	4.73	
Turnout		1,55,467	46.05	
BJP gain from SP		Swing		

=== 2012 ===
U. P. Legislative Assembly Election, 2012: Muzaffarnagar
Party	Candidate	Votes	%	±%
SP	Chitranjan Swaroop	59,169	34.96	
BJP	Ashok Kumar Kansal	44,167	26.09	
BSP	Arvind Raj Sharma	31,529	18.63	
INC	Somansh Prakash	21,171	12.51	
PECP	Mohammad Saleem Ansari	7,293	4.31	
Majority		15,002	8.87	
Turnout		1,69,256	56.10	
SP gain from BJP		Swing		

=== 2007 ===
2022 Uttar Pradesh Legislative Assembly election: Muzaffarnagar
Party	Candidate	Votes	%	±%
BJP	Ashok Kumar Kansal	49,817	49.57	
SP	Chitranjan Swaroop	38,566	41.28	
BSP	Balesh Kumar	29,706	4.76	
RLD	Mushtaq Chaudhary	21,871	1.66	
INC	S. Saiduzzaman	7762	0.75	
Majority		11,261	7.18	
Turnout		1,56,744	43.12%	▼0.90%
BJP hold		Swing	-	

=== 2002 ===
U. P. Legislative Assembly Election, 2002: Muzaffarnagar
Party	Candidate	Votes	%	±%
SP	Chitranjan Swaroop	58,932	38.45	
BJP	Kapil Dev Aggarwal	49,809	32.50	
BSP	Mithlesh Pal	32,004	20.88	
INC	Subhash Maheshwari	5552	13.62	
Majority		9123	5.95	
Turnout		1,53,273	47.59%	
SP gain from BJP		Swing		

=== 1996 ===
U. P. Legislative Assembly Election, 1996: Muzaffarnagar
Party	Candidate	Votes	%	±%
BJP	Susheela Aggarwal	60,696	38.80	
JD	Somansh Prakash	53,144	33.97	
BSP	Mithlesh Pal	39,903	25.51	
Majority		7552	4.83	
Turnout		1,57,825	51.52%	
BJP gain from JD		Swing		

=== 1993 ===
U. P. Legislative Assembly Election, 1993: Muzaffarnagar
Party	Candidate	Votes	%	±%
BJP	Suresh Sangal	92,400	52.85	
SP	Kadir Rana	64,683	37.00	
JD	Rajpal Singh Saini	7160	4.10	
Majority		27,717	15.85	
Turnout		1,77,569	72.36%	
BJP gain from SP		Swing		

=== 1991 ===
U. P. Legislative Assembly Election, 1991: Muzaffarnagar
Party	Candidate	Votes	%	±%
BJP	Suresh Sangal	67,997	54.59	
Independent	Virendra Singh	35,830	28.77	
INC	Subhash Maheshwari	13,208	10.60	
Majority		32,167	25.83	
Turnout		1,28,441	58.82%	
BJP gain from JD		Swing		

== See also ==
- Government of Uttar Pradesh
- Muzaffarnagar Lok Sabha constituency
- List of Vidhan Sabha constituencies of Uttar Pradesh
- Muzaffarnagar district
- Sixteenth Legislative Assembly of Uttar Pradesh
- Uttar Pradesh Legislative Assembly
- Uttar Pradesh
