= Dhindhawali =

Village in Uttar Pradesh, India

Dhindhwali is a village in Muzaffarnagar district, Uttar Pradesh, India. Its total population is 6,267, (3,331 males and 2,936 females). It is located 120 km from the national capital New Delhi. Dhindhawali village is also situated near the Titawi Sugar factory, which is 6 km to the south. It was once famous for "Nakchunti" and "Gud".The main corps is sugar cane. There are mostly jats(jatts) in this village. kutba and nunakhera (a small village) are nearby villages.hookah is most popular in the village . Baliyan(surname) is the main surname of jats (80% are jats).

== Economy ==
The region is one of the important sugarcane producing regions. Sugar and jaggery production are important industries in the Muzaffarnagar district. As a result of the farming activities around, the village is an important hub of jaggery trading business.

More than 40% of the region's population is engaged in agriculture.

== Geography ==
Muzaffarnagar is located at 29.47°N 77.68°E. It is located 120 kilometres NE of the national capital, Delhi, and roughly 200 kilometres SE of Chandigarh. 48,692 26,401 22,291 278,405 154,902 123,503 897 844 80.99 85.82 75.65

== Transportation ==
The village is not situated on the main road, hence the bus service from MuzaffarNagar is infrequent. This village is connected by 4 main road.

== Education ==
There are many schools in this village like arya vedic kanya inter college( girls college) and golden bells academy( a cbse school) and 5 other schools.
