= Mahaljana =

Coordinates: 29°14′N 77°30′E

Mahaljana is a village in west Uttar Pradesh situated 7 kilometers east of Budhana. It comes under Budhana Tehsil of Muzaffarnagar district. Kutubpur Datana, Kurthal and Kavli are the nearby villages. Most of the population in the village is Muslim, with a few Hindu families. Hindon river flows near the village in north.
