= Chitora =

Chitora is the name of multiple villages in India. These include:

- Chitora in Khatauli block, Muzaffarnagar district, Uttar Pradesh
- Chitora in Rajapur block, Ghaziabad district, Uttar Pradesh
- Chitora, Gohad tehsil, Bhind district, Madhya Pradesh
