= Kutubpur Datana =

Kutubpur Datana (known as Datana) is a village of Rava Rajput (or Raya rajputs or Rawa Rajputs, a major clan of the Rajput) is a town in Muzaffarnagar district, India situated 8 kilometres (5.0 mi) east of Budhana.

== Situation ==
The post office lies in the village of Kurthal some 3 kilometres (1.9 mi) away. The village of Datana comes under the Budhana Tehsil. The Hindon River touches the northern border of the village.

There is one primary school and one school just behind it up to 8th class. Shivji Temple is situated beside the primary school.

Agriculture land is mainly divided into two geographical units, Khadar and Bangar, nearer to and further from river respectively. Although sugarcane is the main commercial crop, people also plant poplar trees in abundance.

Villages near Datana are Atali and Nagwa to the east, Mahaljana to the west and Riyawali and Nagla to the north. Buses, jugar, tanga (horse-cart) and e-rikshaw (Electric Rickshaw) are the main modes of transportation. To reach the village from Delhi, there are bus routes via Baraut and Meerut.
