= Mandi, Uttar Pradesh =

Mandi Maandi, Mandy
- village
- Location in Uttar Pradesh, India Mandi (India)
- Coordinates: 29.436234°N 77.574098°E
- Country: India
- State: Uttar Pradesh
- District: Muzaffarnagar
- Block: Baghra

Government
  - Body: Gram Panchayat
- Elevation: 272 m (892 ft)

Population (2000)
  - Total: 4,000

Languages
  - Official: Hindi
- Time zone: UTC+5:30 (IST)
- Vehicle registration: UP-

Mandi is a village in the Muzaffarnagar district of Uttar Pradesh, India. It is located about 200 km northeast of Delhi. It is notable for the discovery and looting of an ancient treasure trove by villagers in June 2000. The treasure is believed to have been from the Indus Valley Civilisation period. It is known as "Mandi treasure" or "Mandy hoard".

== 2000 treasure discovery ==
Till 2000, a mound of mud used to exist on the border of the village. It was located on the 500 sq. m. property of Anil Kumar, who intended to level the land for cultivating sugarcane. He told the other villagers that they could remove the mud from the mound for their own use. In June 2000, three women villagers uncovered a copper urn containing gold ornaments, while scraping mud from the mound. On that day, Anil Kumar had gone out of the village to visit a sick relative. The three women started fighting over the treasure. The noise attracted the family of a landless labourer, who snatched the urn from the women. By the evening, other villagers were also seeking the treasure. A husband-wife duo uncovered another pottery urn containing and estimated 40 kg of bracelets and necklaces. Next, Anil Kumar's cousin and local strongman Sudhir came to the site with eight men, and uncovered more treasure. According to Anil Kumar's mother, who had fled to an adjacent sugarcane field after Sudhir pulled a gun on her, the men discovered around 60 kg of jewellery and three copper urns, also presumably filled with jewellery. Subsequently, the local transport chief and bus driver dug up an estimated 40 kg of gold. By the night, most of the 4,000 villagers had crowded around the plot, digging and fighting for treasure.

The police arrived at around 10 pm. According to a villager Mahinder Singh, the police asked his son to Somi Singh to continue the digging. Somi Singh allegedly unearthed 35 kg of gold pieces and a golden scabbard of a dagger, but was later arrested on the frivolous charges. According to the official records, only 10 kg of treasure was recovered by the district authorities. The authorities estimate that the villagers had uncovered around 500 kg of treasure. They offered the villagers double the market price for the ornaments. However, most of the treasure was sold to the local traders, who melted it.

According to the experts from ASI and the Uttar Pradesh Department of Archaeology (DoA), the jewelry belonged to the Late Harappan period. It resembled the jewelry found at Indus Valley Civilization (IVC) sites such as Harappa, Mohenjo-daro, Lothal, Rakhigarhi and Dholavira in India.

== List of artifacts recovered ==
The list of artifacts recovered by the district authorities is as follows:

Material	Object	Number of pieces	Dimension/Weight
Banded Agate (Black & White Bands)	Bead	6	
Banded Agate (Black & White Bands)	Bead	2	
Copper	Copper incrustation pieces	--	
Copper	Pot (Circular) - Upper Part Partially Broken	1	Height (outer) - 15.5 cm, base diameter (Outer) - 21 cm
Copper	Pot (Rectangular)	1	47 cm x 9.5 cm x 4 cm
Gold	Bead Joint		97.93 g
Gold	Bead Joint		10.71g
Gold	Very fragile bead of foil, with few foil pieces	---	
Gold	Conical-shaped beads	37	141.89 g
Gold	Conical-shaped beads	5	15.65 g
Gold	End Terminal	13	57.15 g
Gold	End Terminal	2	5.99g
Gold	Five thin disc beads joined with an unidentified bead	1	1.76 g
Gold	Cylindrical foil	1	0.30 g
Gold	Spacer	43	45.4 g
Gold	Spacer	5	4.58 g
Gold	Thin Disc Bead	---	8526.03 g
Gold	Thin Disc Bead		948.43 g
Semi-precious stone with multi-color bands	Bead (Type-1)	23	2–3.4 cm
Semi-precious stone with multi-color bands	Bead (Type-1)	3	2–3.4 cm
Semi-precious stone with multi-color bands	Bead (Type-2)	45	1.5-1.99 cm
Semi-precious stone with multi-color bands	Bead (Type-2)	5	1.5-1.99 cm
Semi-precious stone with multi-color bands	Bead (Type-3)	115	0.7-1.49 cm
Semi-precious stone with multi-color bands	Bead (Type-3)	14	0.7-1.49 cm
Semi-precious stone with multi-color bands	Broken bead pieces	8	
Silver	Roughly half of a large hollow kara (bracelet)		
Silver	Broken pieces of a large hollow kara (bracelet)	2	
Unidentified	Bead	6	
Unidentified	Bead	2	

== See also ==
- Indus Valley Civilization
- List of Indus Valley Civilization sites
- List of inventions and discoveries of the Indus Valley Civilization
- Hydraulic engineering of the Indus Valley Civilization
