= Charthaval =

Charthawal
- City
- Location in Uttar Pradesh, India
- Coordinates: 29°33′N 77°35′E
- Country: India
- State: Uttar Pradesh
- District: Muzaffarnagar

Government
  - Type: MLA
  - Body: pankaj Malik

Population (2001)
  - Total: 31,493

Languages
  - Official: Hindi
- Time zone: UTC+5:30 (IST)
- PIN: 251311

Charthawal is a city and a nagar panchayat in Muzaffarnagar district in the state of Uttar Pradesh, India. It acts as the administrator of 59 surrounding villages. The current chairman is Mohammed Islamuddin.

This town is located at a distance of 16 km from the district headquarters, which is on the Muzaffarnagar to Thana Bhawan road.

== Demographics ==
As of the 2001 Indian census, Charthawal had a population of 31,493. Males constituted 53% of the population and females 47%. Charthawal had an average literacy rate of 51%, lower than the national average of 59.5%, with male literacy at 59% and female literacy at 42%. 19% of the population is under 6 years of age.

There are Muslim dominated villages nearby including Nagla Rai, Kulhari, Dadheru, Nyamu, Nirdhana, Alamgirpur, Luhari.

== History ==
Charthawal is listed in the Ain-i-Akbari of the Mughal Empire as a pargana under the sarkar of Saharanpur, producing a revenue of 1,668,882 dams for the imperial treasury and supplying a force of 200 infantry and 20 cavalry.

== Education ==
There are many schools and colleges in Charthawal, including:

1. Kids Heaven Public School (Play to 12th)
2. Jai hind Inter College
3. Maharaja Agrasen Girls Degree College
4. Gandhi Inter College
5. Chandra Shekhar Azad Degree College
6. Abul Kalam Azad Inter College
7. Gandhi Balika High School
8. Arya Kanya Inter College
9. Acharya Abhay Dev Public School
10. Sri Aurovindo Vidya Niketan
11. Nalanda Public School
12. Saraswati Vidhya Mandir
13. Gandhi Shishu Niketan
14. Bal Vidhya Mandir
15. Adarsh Public High School
16. Primary School
17. Tasmia Public School
18. Islamia Public School
19. Kids Heaven High School
20. Aadrsh Public School (Play to 8th)

== Religion ==
Charthawal contains large populations of both Hindus and Muslims.

=== Hinduism ===
Several Hindu temples are based in Charthawal, including Thakurdwara, which was built in the thirteenth century. In 1910, this temple was repaired by one of the wazirs, a family member of Mughal Emperor Jhangir. Another significant temple is Sidhpeeth Devi Mandir. Many people worship Navaratri at this temple. Thirdly, there is an old Bharo Mandir in Murdapati Charthawal, which people visit every Saturday, that's why many people are called Choti Kashi. Locals believe that their wishes will be fulfilled if they visit this temple, and many people visit it in the month of Asadh. A famous writer Dr. Ashok Kumar Premi composed a song about this town's temples and special things. Finally, there is a shiv mandir where exists a natural Shivling where a large number of people visit in Sawan. This town is so auspicious because Bhagwan Mhadev appeared in front of atmadev brhamin and gave a special idol of Radhavallabh ji at nearby Mhadev Mandir. Then a temple was built in one night for radhavallabh ji known as Thakurdwara mandir.

The Divine Command to Shri Hit Harivansh Mahaprabhu

 Shri Hit Harivansh Mahaprabhu, the future founder of the Radha Vallabh Sampradaya, was residing in a place called Devavan. He was a highly spiritual person, considered by his followers to be an incarnation of Lord Krishna's flute (banshi).

When he was 32 years old, he came to charthawal in 1534(samvat 1590-91). He received a divine instruction from Goddess Radha herself in a dream. She told him to travel to Vrindavan and to marry the two daughters of Atmadev, who lived at this town Charthawal. She also commanded him to take the precious idol of Radha Vallabh with him to Vrindavan to establish a new tradition of worship. Atmadev also received a similar dream, instructing him to give his daughters and the sacred idol to Shri Hit Harivansh Mahaprabhu.

=== Islam ===
There are many mosques in Charthaval, with two considered the oldest. One of them, known as Jama Masjid Tagayan, is situated at Sheikh Garvi (west) (غركى). It was supposedly built by the Mughal emperor Feroz Shah Tughlaq in the 17th century. The other mosque, Jama Masjid (also known as 'Amina Masjid' Sheikhzadgan near Hakim Nazar Ahsan), is located at Sheikhzadgan Sharki (east) (شركى) and is approximately 360 years old. The University of Islamic Studies Darul Uloom Deoband is twenty kilometres away from Charthawal.

== Business ==
There are two sugar cane crushers and small-scale sugar cane plants (Kolhu) in Charthaval. These produce Jagerry (Gurh in Urdu/Hindi) after processing sugar cane juice. They produce from October to May and net a hundred million Indian rupees in revenue each season. Bajaj Hindusthan Limited, Titawi Sugar Mill and Rohana Sugar Refinery companies are based in the town.

Charthawal is also known for its wholesale wood market. The town features more than ten wholesale shops for wood, which purchase eucalyptus, poplar, teak, sheesham and other logs from farmers and sell them to plywood manufacturers. The wood market of Charthawal generates between one and two million rupees of revenue per day.

== See also ==
- Hakimpura
