= Baghra =

Town in Muzaffarnagar district

Coordinates: 29°28′N 77°35′E

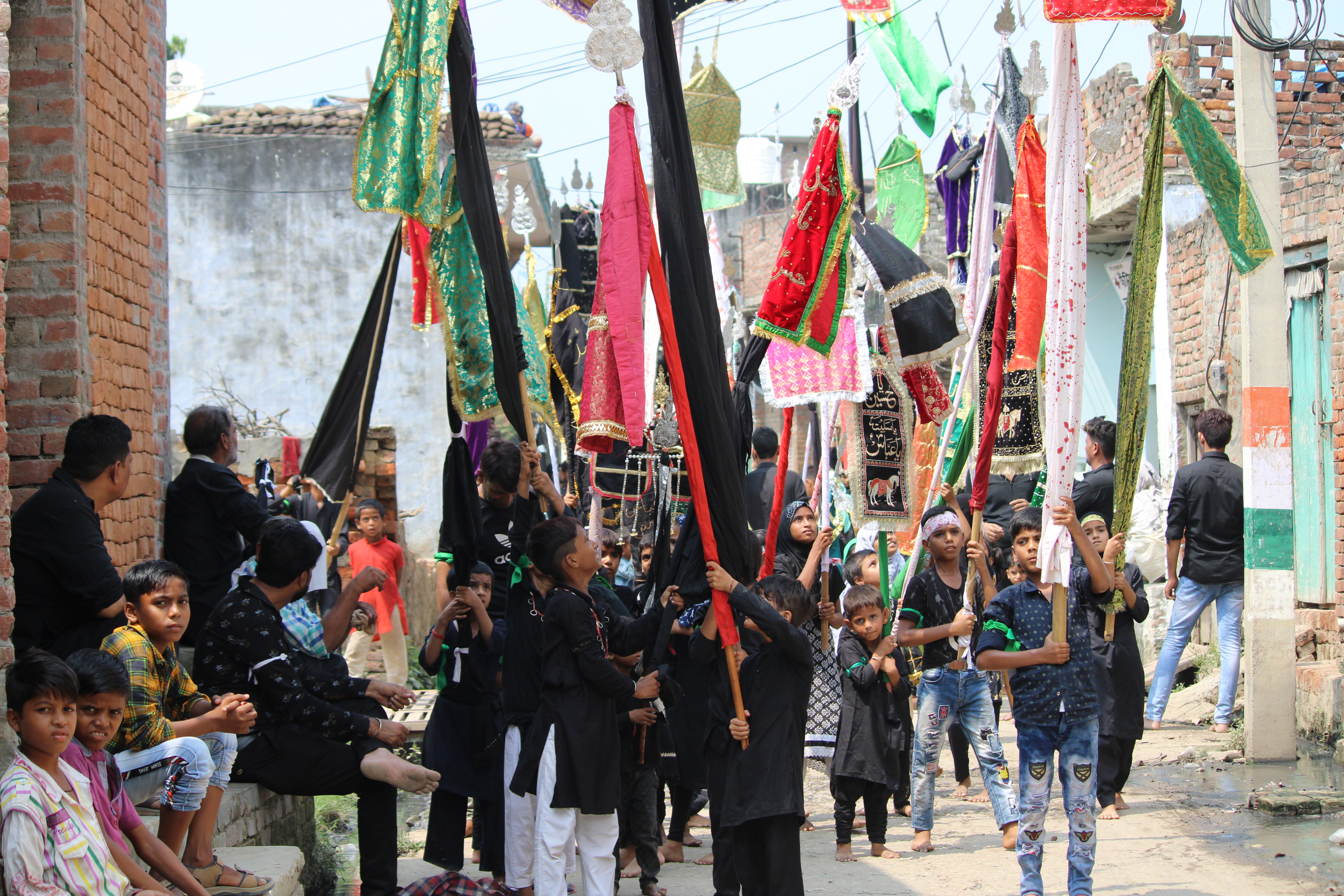
Moharram In Baghra Town

Baghra is a town situated in the Charthawal Assembly constituency of Muzaffarnagar District in Uttar Pradesh, India. It is located 11.83 kilometres from the district headquarters at Muzaffarnagar, and is 440 kilometres from the state capital Lucknow. Baghra is the headquarters of the Baghra Mandal, the lowest administrative unit in Uttar Pradesh. The town was the centre of a Jat community which rule area principally in the 19th century. It has a population of about 20,122 people living in around 2931 households.

Villages near Baghra include Saidpur Khurd (1.2 km), Alipurkhurd (2.5 km), Mandi (2.8 km), Jagaheri (3.2 km), Budinakhurd (3.5 km), Amirnagar (3.7 km) Narottampur (4.0 km) and Dhindhawali.
