= Bhokarhedi =

- Town
- Location in Uttar Pradesh, India Bhokarhedi (India)
- Coordinates: 29°31′15″N 77°56′29″E
- Country: India
- State: Uttar Pradesh
- District: Muzaffarnagar

Government
  - Type: Nagar panchayat

Population (2001)
  - Total: 15,973

Languages
  - Official: Hindi
- Time zone: UTC+5:30 (IST)
- Vehicle registration: UP
- Website: up.gov.in

Bhokarhedi is a town and a nagar panchayat in the Muzaffarnagar district in the state of Uttar Pradesh, India.

== Demographics ==
As of 2001 India census, Bhokarhedi had a population of 15,973. Males constituted 54% of the population and females 46%. The average literacy rate was 51%, lower than the national average of 59.5%; with male literacy 59% and female literacy 41%. 17% of the population was under 6 years of age. Timur or Tamarlane discusses a battle he fought with Hindu Jat and Gurjar warriors while going to Hardwar during 1398-1399 campaign in January 1399.

There are 12 wards in Bhokerhadi (Lokupura Uttari, Lokupura Dakshani, Baheda Patti, Klallan, Pathanan, Kuwa patti, Main Bazaar, Nai Basti, Harizan Chowk, Nehru Chowk, Shubash Chowk and Seth Puri).

The main crop produced in Bhokerdadi is sugarcane.

It is located at latitude 29.5079172 and longitude 77.9368105.
