= Kawal, Uttar Pradesh =

Kawal
- Word
- Location in Uttar Pradesh, India Kawal (India)
- Coordinates: 29°20′0″N 77°51′0″E
- Country: India
- State: Uttar Pradesh
- District: Muzaffarnagar
- Block: Jansath
- Elevation: 232 m (761 ft)

Languages
  - Official: Hindi
- Time zone: UTC+5:30 (IST)
- Vehicle registration: UP-12
- Nearest town: Jansath
- Lok Sabha constituency: Bijnor
- Website: up.gov.in

Kawal is a village located in the Muzaffarnagar district of Uttar Pradesh. The foundation of this village was laid in the year 1678 by Nathu Nambardar, a respected member of the Qureshi community.

== History ==
In 2013, a dispute between Hindus and Muslims in Kawal triggered the 2013 Muzaffarnagar riots. On 7 September 2013, over 150,000 people from the neighbouring states of Haryana and Delhi gathered in Kawal village for a "Jat Mahapanchayat", many of them carrying weapons. There had been allegations of a Muslim man harassing a Hindu girl followed by the murder of two young Jat men and a Muslim youth. The gathering was called to show solidarity of Hindu groups against Muslims. After the gathering, scores of vehicle carrying peacefully returning Jat youth were burned, and many of the bodies were never recovered, as per estimate 23 tractors and 7 bikes were burned and washed away in Ganges till Bulandshahar but SDM of Jansat only reported 13 in his report to then CM and PM. Many of the victims reportedly killed were Gyanendra Singh (chairman of Nagar Panchayat Bhokhrahi), Udayveer Singh Rampal, Pratap Singh and Manoj from Rahmatpur village, Ajay Kumar of Rahmatpur, Sonveer Singh of Bhokhrahi and Brijpal of Baseda. In other incidents, by 8 September, "over 50 people had already been murdered, a number of women allegedly raped, and several thousand people displaced." Girls from the village stopped going to school and requested then chief Minister of U.P. Akhilesh Yadav to provide alternate road to their school. All 7 accused of the murder of the Jat boys have been awarded life imprisonments by Muzaffarnagar District court in February 2019 while the counter-case towards the Jat men is still going and charges have framed.

== Geography ==
It is located at 29.33° N 77.85° E. It has an average elevation of 232 meters (761 feet) above Mean Sea Level (MSL).

== Demographics ==
Its population is approximately 12,000.
