= Jouli =

Jauli
- Jauli (Uttar Pradesh)
- Interactive map of Jauli
- Coordinates: 29°25′38.14″N 77°51′34.29″E
- Country: India
- State: Uttar Pradesh
- District: Muzaffarnagar

Area
  - Total: 13.2865 km^{2} (5.1299 sq mi)
- Elevation: 232 m (761 ft)

Population (2011)
  - Total: 10,828
  - Density: 814.96/km^{2} (2,110.7/sq mi)

Languages
  - Official: Hindi & Urdu
- Time zone: UTC+5:30 (IST)
- Postal code: 251308

Jouli, Jauli or Jolly is a village in Muzaffarnagar district, Uttar Pradesh India. It comes under Tehsil Jansath, Uttar Pradesh, which is one of the sub-divisions of the Sadaat-e-Bara. It is located 18km from Muzaffarnagar city and 0.5 km downstream of Upper Ganges Canal and 8 km from Bhopa. The canal is bifurcated at Jauli village, to Anupshahar branch.

This village is inhabited by Shia Sayyids. The Sayyids of this village migrated to India from Gardez, in present day Afghanistan, and claim descent from Musa al-Kazim.

== Geography ==
Jauli has an average elevation of 232 metres (761 feet).

== History ==
Jauli is a very old village. Jauli is located in Uttar Pradesh the north-western part of India, about 120 km from the National Capital of Delhi. Syed Vais came to Jolly in 1579 after retirement from the Mughal Army. In the Mughal Army he worked as Mansab Dar. The descendants of Syed Vais ruled over Riyasat Haza Jauli since 1579 to 1952 (15 July) till Zamindar abolition. Syed Irtaza Hasnain and Syed Mujtaba Hasnain was the last ruler of Riyasat Haza Jauli.

== Famous Locations ==
- Roza-E-Imam Sajjad (A.S.) is situated in Jauli. It is the only shrine in India which is attributed to Imam al-Sajjad (a) (The fourth Imam of Shia Community).
