= Rohana Khurd =

Village and archaeological site in Uttar Pradesh, India

- Village
- Location in Uttar Pradesh, India
- Coordinates: 29.59127°N 77.70292°E
- Country: India
- State: Uttar Pradesh
- District: Muzaffarnagar
- Tehsil: Muzaffarnagar

Area
  - Total: 5.042 km^{2} (1.947 sq mi)

Population (2011)
  - Total: 3,558
  - Density: 705.7/km^{2} (1,828/sq mi)
- Time zone: UTC+5:30 (IST)

Rohana Khurd is a village and archaeological site in Charthawal block of Muzaffarnagar district, Uttar Pradesh. It is the southern part of a contiguous settlement with Rohana Kalan to the north. As of 2011, Rohana Khurd has a population of 3,558, in 604 households.

== Geography ==
Rohana Khurd is the southern part of what is actually one contiguous settlement called "Rohana"; the northern part is called Rohana Kalan. The village is located about 18 km north of Muzaffarnagar on State Highway 59, with a road branching off from the highway to the east to get to the village. An old archaeological mound, variously called Bhumia Khera or Khera Khel Ashram, is located to the southeast of Rohana Khurd, and about 400 m east of that the Kali river, which makes a sharp meander at this point that brings it close to the mound.

== Archaeology ==
Archaeological excavation at the mound near Rohana Khurd in the 2010s, using the Harris matrix method for dating, indicated that it was the site of a rural settlement beginning during either the late Painted Grey Ware period or during the transitional period between the Painted Grey Ware and Northern Black Polished Ware cultures. There appears to have been a gap in occupation in the first few centuries CE before the site was re-occupied around the 4th century. It was then inhabited until approximately the 10th century, and possibly abandoned around the 11th century. Later, the mound was used as a burial site and then, more recently, for ritual purposes.

== Demographics ==
As of 2011, Rohana Khurd had a population of 3,558, in 604 households. This population was 52.2% male (1,856) and 47.8% female (1,702). The 0-6 age group numbered 387 (188 male and 199 female), making up 10.9% of the total population. 417 residents were members of Scheduled Castes, or 11.7% of the total.

The 1961 census recorded Rohana Khurd as comprising 1 hamlet, with a total population of 2,233 people (1,211 male and 1,012 female), in 403 households and 403 physical houses. The area of the village was given as 1,226 acres.

== Infrastructure ==
As of 2011, Rohana Khurd had 2 primary schools and 1 primary health centre. Drinking water was provided by tube well/bore well; there were no public toilets. The village had a sub post office but no public library; there was at least some access to electricity for all purposes. Streets were made of both kachcha and pakka materials.
