= Hakimpura =

Coordinates: 29°32′N 77°35′E

Hakimpura is a small village in Charthaval block in India, having a population of three thousand people, was established by Hakim Sadaruddin, the famous raees and zamindar of the area in late 18th century.

All the population of this village is of Dalit. They were poor and uneducated during their establishment in this village but now some of their offspring are highly qualified and on the higher government posts. Literacy rate of this village is 47%, lower than to 57%, the national literacy rate.

The villagers are still thankful to Late Hakim Sadaruddin, who had established them in the village.
