= Jarauda =

Village in Muzaffarnagar Uttar Pradesh

Jaroda
- Village
- Interactive map of Jaroda
- Coordinates: 29°24′07″N 77°41′16″E
- Country: India
- State: Uttar Pradesh
- District: Muzaffarnagar
- Tehsil: Muzaffarnagar

Area
  - Total: 9.6788 km^{2} (3.7370 sq mi)

Population (2011)
  - Total: 11,708
  - Density: 1,209.7/km^{2} (3,133.0/sq mi)

Jaroda is a village in Muzaffarnagar district in the Indian state of Uttar Pradesh. It is located in Muzaffarnagar tehsil and has a 2011 Census population of 11,708 people living in 1,965 households. The village covers an area of 967.88 hectares and has the Census village code 110957.

== Demographics ==
According to the Census of India 2011, Jaroda had a population of 11,708 people living in 1,965 households. Of the total population, 6,111 were male and 5,597 were female. The population aged 0–6 years was 1,844.

The village had a sex ratio of 916 females per 1,000 males. The literacy rate was 68.12%, with male literacy at 77.84% and female literacy at 57.52%.

== Education ==
=== Government schools ===
The official records of the Muzaffarnagar district administration list the following schools in Jaroda:

- Primary School Number 1, Jaroda
- Primary School Number 2, Jaroda
- Girls Upper Primary School, Jaroda
- Primary School, Jaroda.

=== Private schools ===
Private schools listed in the Jaroda cluster include:

- Bal Kunj Niketan, Jaroda
- Holi Child Public School
- Holy Child Public High Secondary School, Jarauda
- JA N Jagriti JHS, Jaroda
- Jaibharat Shishu Niketan, Jarau
- R.D. PS, Jaroda
- Saraswati Gyan Mandir, Jarauda

These schools are listed in school records for the Jarauda cluster of Muzaffarnagar district.

== Healthcare ==
Jaroda has a government Primary Health Centre (PHC), listed as PHC Jaroda by the National Health Authority under Muzaffarnagar district, Uttar Pradesh. The facility is listed for general medicine services.

== Banking ==
Jaroda has banking facilities including branches of the following banks:

- Central Bank of India
- Sarva UP Gramin Bank

The Central Bank of India has a branch listed at Village and Post Office Jaroda, Muzaffarnagar.

Sarva UP Gramin Bank has been listed among the banking institutions serving the Muzaffarnagar area by the district administration.

== Railway stations ==
Jaroda is served by two railway stations in and around the village:

- Jarauda Nara railway station (JDW) is a station on the Indian Railways network. Although the station is commonly associated with Nara village, it is located near Jaroda and serves the surrounding area.
- New Jaroda Nara is a station on the Eastern Dedicated Freight Corridor (EDFC), operated by the Dedicated Freight Corridor Corporation of India Limited (DFCCIL). The station is listed among the EDFC stations in DFCCIL documents.
