= Kapil Dev Agarwal =

Indian politician

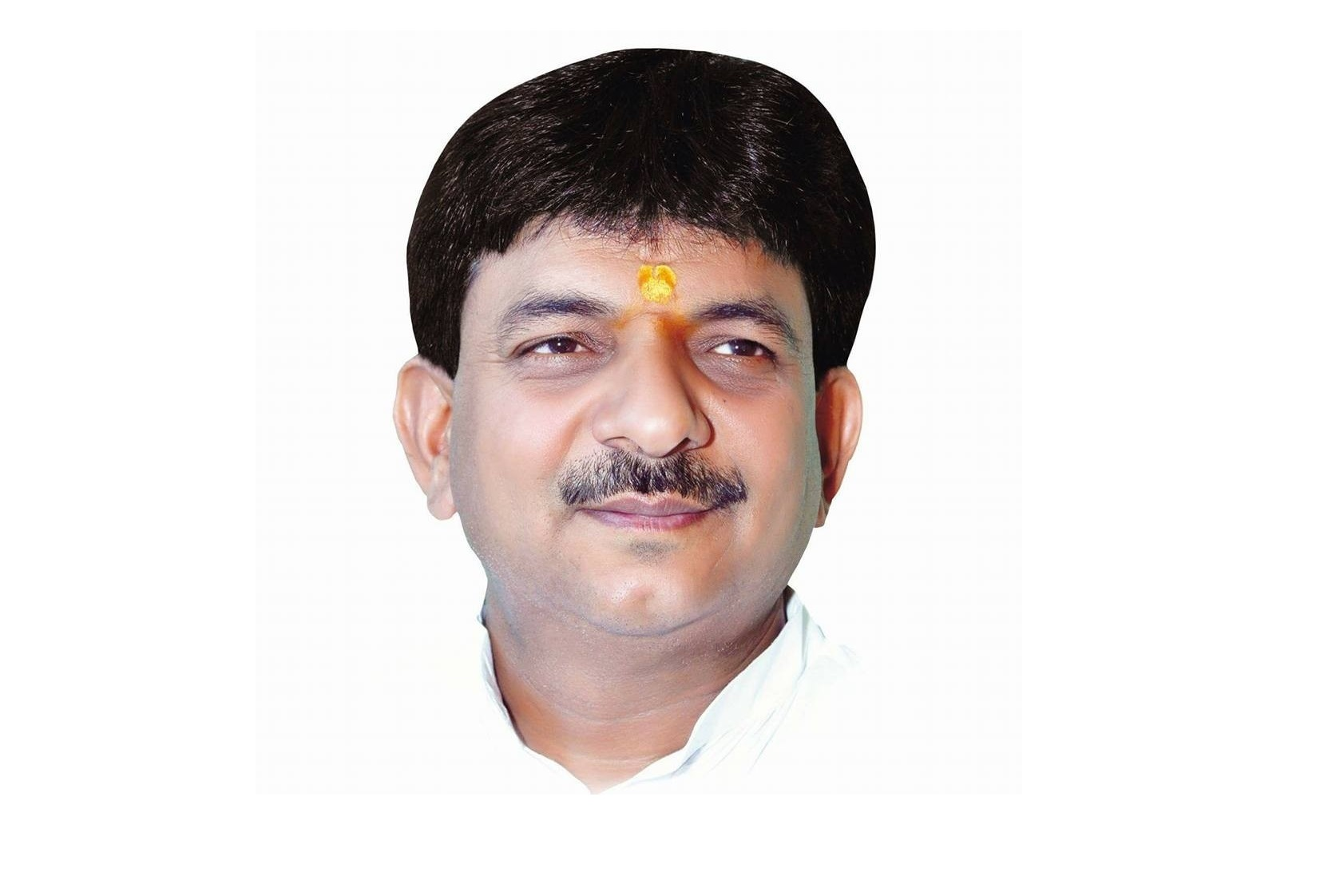

Minister of Vocational Education & Skill Development Government of Uttar Pradesh
- Incumbent
- Assumed office 21 August 2019
- Chief Minister: Yogi Adityanath
- Preceded by: Chetan Chauhan

Member of Uttar Pradesh Legislative Assembly
- Incumbent
- Assumed office 2016
- Preceded by: Chitranjan Swaroop
- Constituency: Muzaffarnagar

Personal details
- Born: 6 June 1966 (age 60) Muzaffarnagar, Uttar Pradesh, India
- Citizenship: Indian
- Party: Bhartiya Janta Party
- Spouse: Anujbala Agarwal (m. 1991)
- Children: 2 sons, 1 daughter
- Parent: Rameshchand Agarwal (father)
- Education: Graduation from Meerut University
- Profession: Politician

Kapil Dev Agarwal is an Indian politician. He is a third-time M.L.A. from Muzaffarnagar, Uttar Pradesh. He belongs to Bharatiya Janata Party and he was also a former chairman of Muzaffarnagar Nagar Palika. He was appointed a Minister of State (independent charge) in the Yogi Adityanath-led UP Government. He holds the portfolio of Skill Development and Vocational Education.

== Political career ==
Kapil Dev Aggarwal is a member of the 18th Legislative Assembly of Uttar Pradesh, and previously also served in the 16th and 17th Legislative Assemblies of Uttar Pradesh. Since 2016, he has represented the Muzaffarnagar Assembly constituency and is a member of the Bharatiya Janata Party. He defeated Gaurav Swaroop in the bypolls held in 2016 by a margin of 7,352 votes. He retained his seat when he again defeated Gaurav Swaroop in the assembly elections of 2017 by a margin of 10,704 votes and was sworn in as the Minister of Skill Development and Vocational Education in the first cabinet expansion of Yogi Adityanath-led UP Government.

In 2022 Uttar Pradesh Assembly Elections he defeated Saurabh Swaroop of SP-RLD alliance by a margin of 18,694 votes. He was reappointed the Minister of Skill Development and Vocational Education in Second Yogi Adityanath ministry.

== Posts held ==
No.	From	To	Position	Comments
01	February 2016	March 2017	Member, 16th Legislative Assembly	
02	March 2017	March 2022	Member, 17th Legislative Assembly	
03	March 2022	Incumbent	Member, 18th Uttar Pradesh Assembly	
