= Adampur Mouchri =

- village
- Interactive map of Adampur Mouchri
- Coordinates: 29.2298°N 77.7683°E
- Country: India
- State: Uttar Pradesh
- District: Muzaffarnagar

Languages
  - Official: Hindi
- Time zone: UTC+5:30 (IST)
- Vehicle registration: UP-
- Coastline: 0 kilometres (0 mi)
- Website: up.gov.in

Adampur Mouchri is a village near the town of Khatauli in Muzaffarnagar district, Uttar Pradesh, India.

The village is located 8 kilometres (5.0 mi) from Khatauli.

There is one primary school in Adampur Mouchri and two nursery schools.

Adampur Mouchri consists two major castes which are Jats, Gurjar and some Saini also. The total population of the village is near about 1000 people, distributed among 60 to 70 residences.
