= Muzaffarnagar Medical College =

Medical College in Uttar Pradesh

- Motto: Sarvāṇī svāsthaya sulabha
- Motto in English: Health To All
- Type: Medical College
- Established: 2006
- Academic affiliations: Atal Bihari Vajpayee Medical University (2021-present); Chaudhary Charan Singh University (2006-2021)
- Principal: Rohtas Kanwar Yadava
- Undergraduates: 200 per year
- Postgraduates: 90 per year
- Location: Opp. Begrajpur Industrial Area, NH - 58, Delhi- Dehradun Highway, Ghasipura, Muzaffarnagar, Uttar Pradesh, India; 29.3724°N 77.7067°E
- Campus: Urban
- Nickname: MMC
- Website: www.mmcollege.org

Muzaffarnagar Medical College (MMC) in Muzaffarnagar, Western Uttar Pradesh, India. It provides subsidised health care to the surrounding rural areas of Muzaffarnagar district.

== History ==
Muzaffarnagar Medical College was established in 2006 by the Fateh Chand Charitable Trust under the chairmanship of Late Sh. Satish C. Goel. The college is approved by the Medical Council of India, a division of the Ministry of Health and Family Welfare of the Government of India. The medical college was affiliated with Chaudhary Charan Singh University at Meerut from 2006-202. The college has been affiliated with newly established Atal Bihari Vajpayee Medical University since 2021.

== Academics ==
MMC is currently offering various courses:

- M.B.B.S. (Annual intake of 150 Recognized and 50 Permitted Students)
- M.D. / M.S. in various disciplines (20 permitted seats and 70 Recognized seats)
- General Nursing & Midwifery (GNM)
- Diploma in Physiotherapy, Optometry and O.T. Technician

== Muzaffarnagar Medical College Hospital ==
Muzaffarnagar Medical College Hospital (MMCH) is a 950 bedded tertiary care centre with various clinical and super-speciality departments including Cardiology and Nephrology. The hospital has general diagnosis facilities such as CT Scan, MRI and DSA. MMCH also provide the Dialysis, IVF and Cath Lab along with a 24-hour blood bank and in-house pharmacy.

The attached medical college has all non-clinical and para-clinical departments including Anatomy, Physiology, Pharmacology, Forensic Medicine, Community Medicine and a central library. During the COVID-19 pandemic in India in 2020, the medical college has been designated as level 1 and level 2 Quarantine and treatment center for the Muzaffarnagar district.
