= Jamalpur Bangar =

Village in Muzaffarnagar District, Uttar Pradesh, India

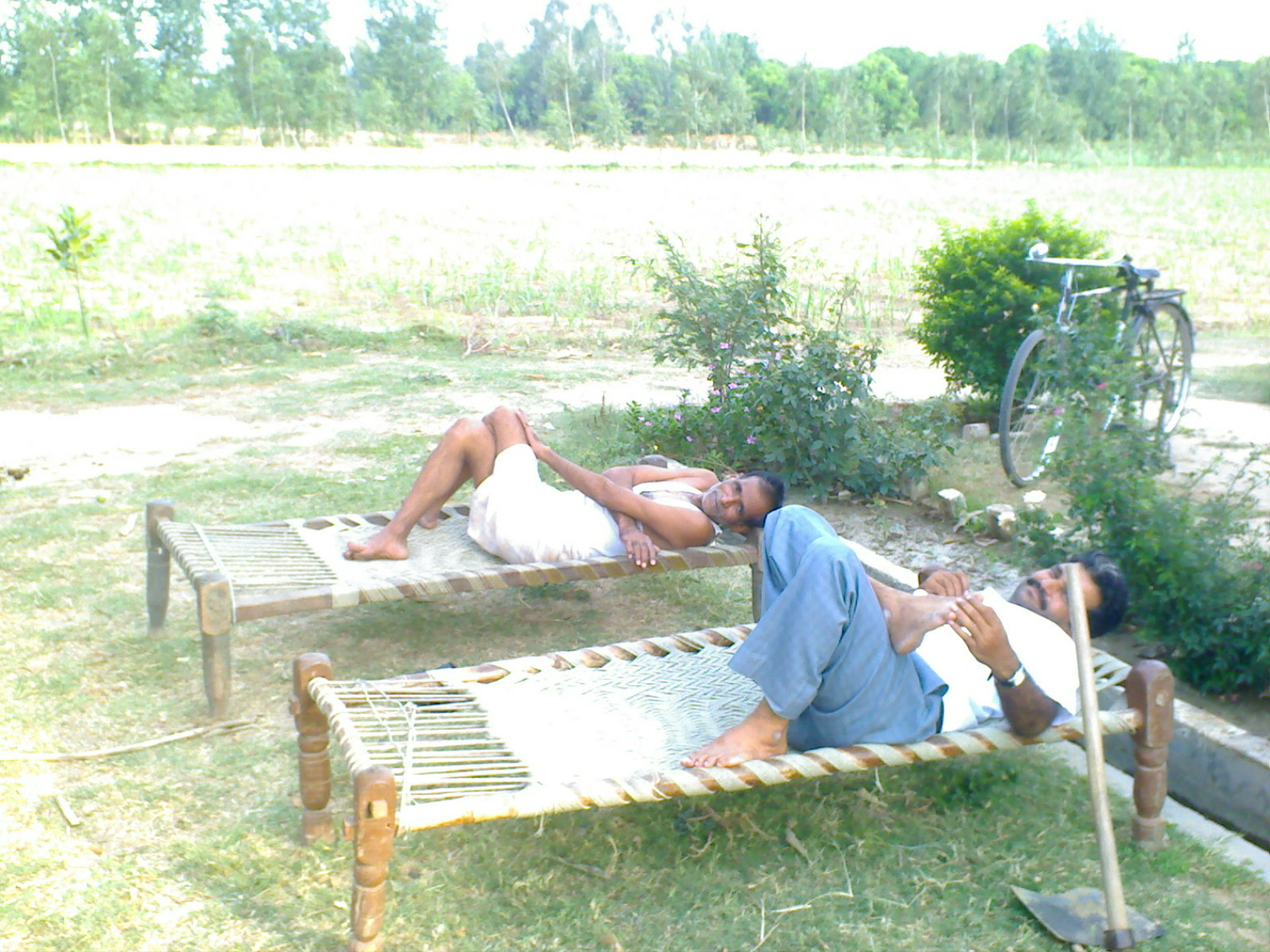

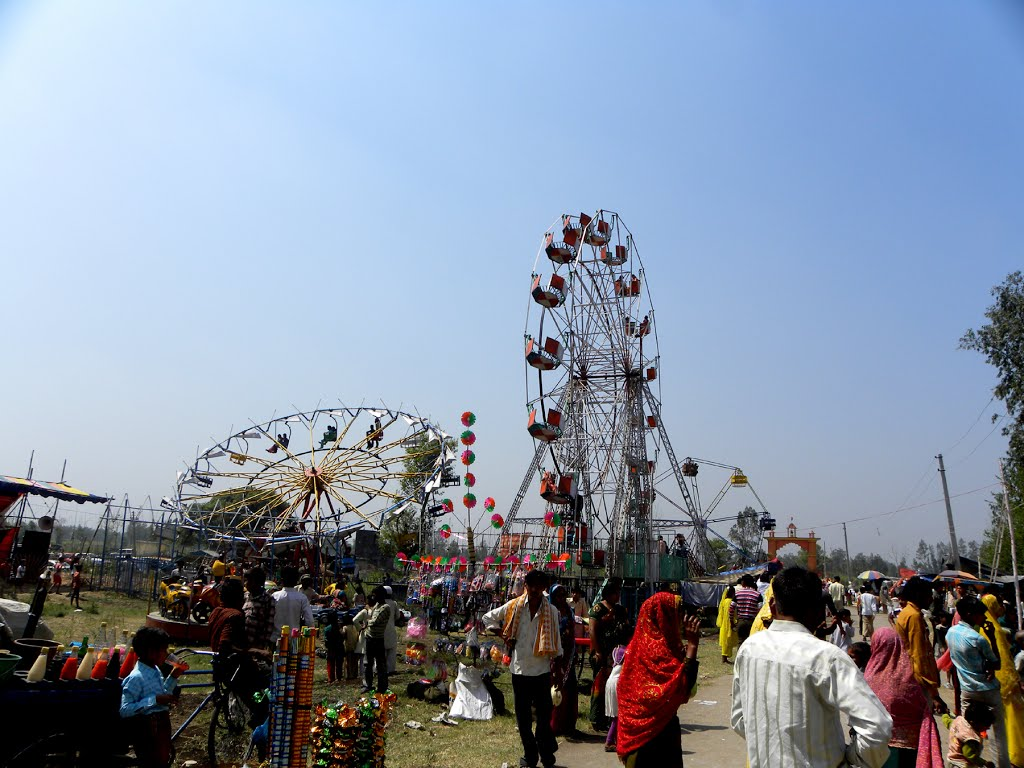

Jamalpur Bangar is a small village in Muzaffarnagar District in the Indian state of Uttar Pradesh. It is situated on Meerut-Paudi and Panipat-Khatima road which is a national highway and 2 kilometres from Mirapur.

The primary occupation is agriculture. The village hosts Sheetla Mata Mandir and Bhabra ka Mela festival, which is organised annually.

The first gram pradhan was Late Pradhan Shri Raghuveer Singh Tomar (son of Shri Sunehri Singh Ji) and last was Pradhan Krishan Pal Singh (son of Shri Babu Ram Verma Kasana). From then onward, Gram Panchyat of this village is joined with Gram Panchayat Sikrera. For the development of this village credit goes to Late Shri Sunehri Singh Ji, late Shri Babu Ram Verma Ji and late shri Bhundiya singh(lala) ji.

It has a primary school. It offers a well-defined boundary and playground.
