= Adampur, Uttar Pradesh =

Village in Uttar Pradesh, India

Coordinates: 25.973°N 81.780°E

Adampur is a small village in Pratapgarh district, Uttar Pradesh, India.

It is situated at the bank of Sai River (a tributary of River Ganges). Adampur's nearest market is Rasooli Bazar and Kithawar Bazar.

== Railway station ==
Its nearest train station is Antu which is 15 kilometres (9.3 mi) away.
