= Chhawani Adampur =

- village
- Location within Madhya Pradesh Location within India
- Coordinates: 23.2552892°N 77.5400876°E
- Country: India
- State: Madhya Pradesh
- District: Bhopal
- Tehsil: Huzur
- Elevation: 461 m (1,512 ft)

Population (2011)
  - Total: 3,842
- Time zone: UTC+5:30 (IST)
- ISO 3166 code: MP-IN
- 2011 census code: 482432

Chhawani Adampur is a village in the Bhopal district of Madhya Pradesh, India. It is located in the Huzur tehsil and the Phanda block.

== Demographics ==
According to the 2011 census of India, Chhawani Adampur has 851 households. The effective literacy rate (i.e. the literacy rate of population excluding children aged 6 and below) is 54.79%.

Demographics (2011 Census)
	Total	Male	Female
Population	3842	2039	1803
Children aged below 6 years	672	329	343
Scheduled caste	707	363	344
Scheduled tribe	52	26	26
Literates	1737	1071	666
Workers (all)	1509	1166	343
Main workers (total)	1035	815	220
Main workers: Cultivators	106	88	18
Main workers: Agricultural labourers	176	128	48
Main workers: Household industry workers	32	27	5
Main workers: Other	721	572	149
Marginal workers (total)	474	351	123
Marginal workers: Cultivators	11	5	6
Marginal workers: Agricultural labourers	73	42	31
Marginal workers: Household industry workers	5	5	0
Marginal workers: Others	385	299	86
Non-workers	2333	873	1460
