= Shahpur, Uttar Pradesh =

Shahpur
- Town
- Location in Uttar Pradesh, India Shahpur (India)
- Coordinates: 29.35°N 77.55°E
- Country: India
- State: Uttar Pradesh
- District: Muzaffarnagar
- Elevation: 237 m (778 ft)

Population (2001)
  - Total: 17,186

Language
  - Official: Hindi
  - Additional official: Urdu
- Time zone: UTC+5:30 (IST)
- Vehicle registration: UP-12
- Website: up.gov.in

Shahpur is a town and a nagar panchayat in Muzaffarnagar district in the Indian state of Uttar Pradesh. As of 2001, it had a population of 17,186.

== Geography ==
Shahpur is located at 29.35°N 77.55°E. It has an average elevation of 237 metres (777 feet).

== Demographics ==
As of the 2001 Census of India, Shahpur had a population of 17,186. Males constitute 53% of the population and females 47%. Shahpur has an average literacy rate of 49%, lower than the national average of 59.5%: male literacy is 57%, and female literacy is 40%. In Shahpur, 18% of the population is under 6 years of age.
