= Saharanpur division =

Administrative division of Uttar Pradesh, India

Coordinates: 29.9700°N 77.5400°E

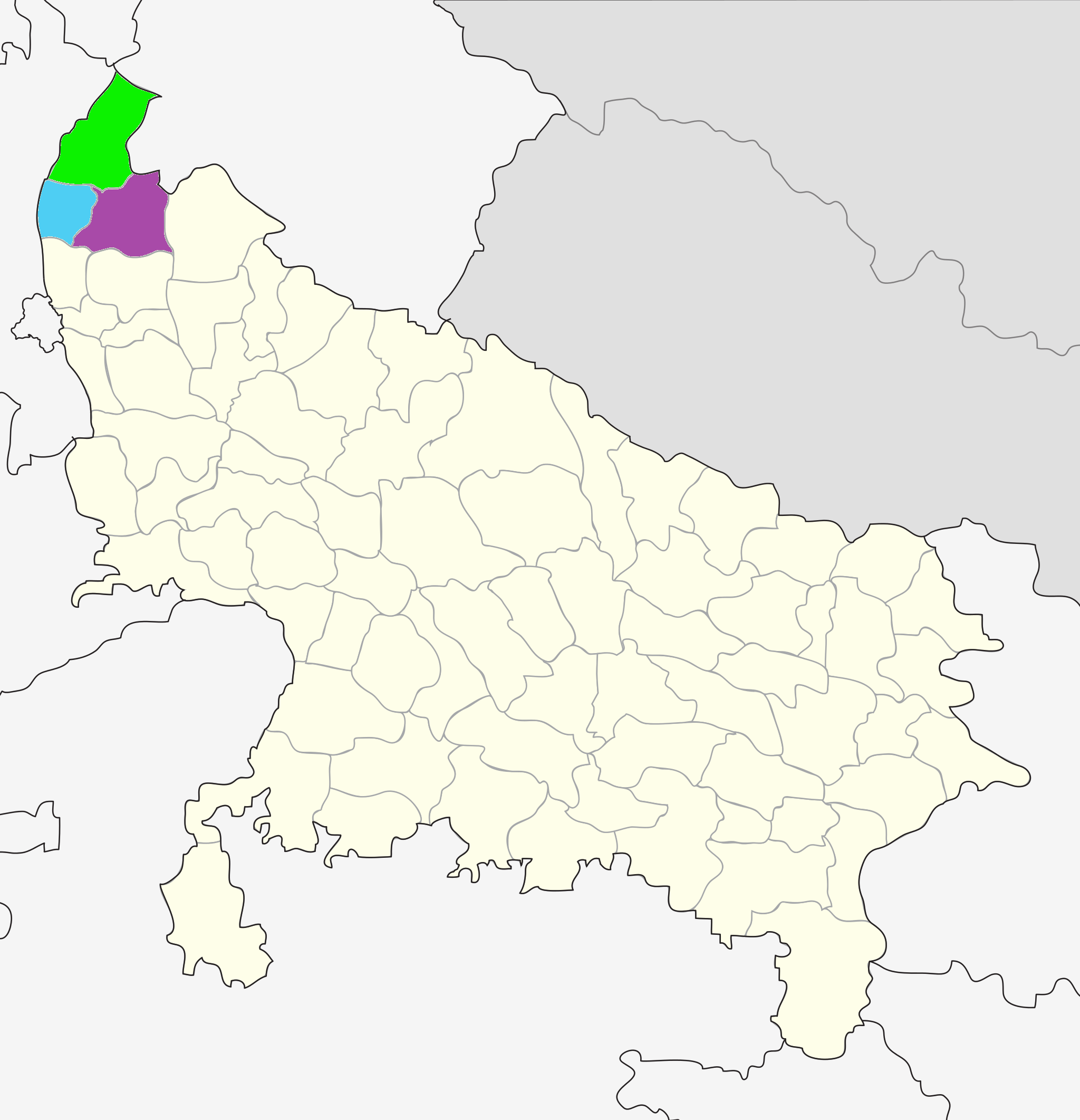
Different districts of Saharanpur division Saharanpur Shamli Muzaffarnagar

Saharanpur division is one of the 18 administrative geographical units (i.e. division) of the northern Indian state of Uttar Pradesh that came into effect in April 1997. The city of Saharanpur is the administrative headquarters of the division.

== Administrative jurisdiction ==
This division has 3 districts under its jurisdiction:

- Saharanpur
- Shamli
- Muzaffarnagar

Before formation of uttarakhand, haridwar district was also part of saharanpur divisonary commission.

== Demography ==
Total population of Saharanpur Division is 7,609,894. Among them,4,349,806 are Hindus, 3,165,505 are Muslim and 94,583 are follower of other religion.

Religion in Saharanpur Division (2011)
1. Hinduism (57.2%)
2. Islam (41.6%)
3. Others (1.24%)

== See also ==
- Shakambhari, a temple area north of Saharanpur
- North India, the region in which Saharanpur lies
