= Kawal Rhode =

English biomedical engineer

- Education: St Thomas's Hospital Medical School
- Engineering career
- Discipline: Biomedical engineering
- Institutions: King's College London

Kawal Rhode is an English biomedical engineer. He is a full professor of biomedical engineering and the head of education at the School of Biomedical Engineering and Imaging Sciences at King's College London (KCL), England, United Kingdom.

== Biography ==
Rhode completed his BSc degree at the Guy's & St. Thomas' Hospitals Medical School, and PhD at the University College London. He then started working at KCL in 2001 as a post-doctoral scientist in the area of image-guided interventions. He worked on the image registration methods to register cardiac MRI and X-ray fluoroscopy data. He progressed to the post of a lecturer in 2007, and senior lecturer in 2011, Reader in 2015, and a full-professor in 2016. He oversees the engineering, sciences, and iBSc courses at bachelor's and master's levels.

His research focuses on image processing based guided surgical interventions, 3D printing, cardiac biophysical modelling in humans, medical robotics, and pedagogy for biomedical engineering.

His research on pacemakers in patients is mentioned in Science Newsletters. He was covered in a news article for developing a novel steerable catheter in a collaborative effort between KCL and Cambridge Design Partnership (CDP). Rhode was also covered by BioScience Today, where he spoke with Ellen Rossiter explaining him about his research work, inspirations, and motivations behind his research in the area of biomedical engineering.

== Selected publications ==
A list of selected publications with over 1000 total citations are listed below:

- 356 citations: Native T1 mapping in differentiation of normal myocardium from diffuse disease in hypertrophic and dilated cardiomyopathy. Valentina O Puntmann, Tobias Voigt, Zhong Chen, Manuel Mayr, Rashed Karim, Kawal Rhode, Ana Pastor, Gerald Carr-White, Reza Razavi, Tobias Schaeffter, Eike Nagel. JACC: Cardiovascular Imaging 6 (4), 475–484.
- 355 citations: Cardiac catheterisation guided by MRI in children and adults with congenital heart disease. Reza Razavi, Derek LG Hill, Stephen F Keevil, Marc E Miquel, Vivek Muthurangu, Sanjeet Hegde, Kawal Rhode, Michael Barnett, Joop van Vaals, David J Hawkes, Edward Baker. The Lancet 362 (9399), 1877–1882.
- 208 citations: A registration-based propagation framework for automatic whole heart segmentation of cardiac MRI. X Zhuang, KS Rhode, RS Razavi, DJ Hawkes, S Ourselin. IEEE transactions on medical imaging 29 (9), 1612–1625.
- 206 citations: Patient-specific electromechanical models of the heart for the prediction of pacing acute effects in CRT: a preliminary clinical validation. Maxime Sermesant, Radomir Chabiniok, Phani Chinchapatnam, Tommaso Mansi, Florence Billet, Philippe Moireau, Jean-Marc Peyrat, K Wong, Jatin Relan, Kawal Rhode, Matthew Ginks, Pier Lambiase, Hervé Delingette, Michel Sorine, C Aldo Rinaldi, Dominique Chapelle, Reza Razavi, Nicholas Ayache. Medical image analysis 16 (1), 201–215.
- 197 citations: A system for real-time XMR guided cardiovascular intervention. Kawal S Rhode, Maxime Sermesant, David Brogan, Sanjeet Hegde, John Hipwell, Pier Lambiase, Eric Rosenthal, Clifford Bucknall, Shakeel A Qureshi, Jaswinder S Gill, Reza Razavi, Derek LG Hill. IEEE transactions on medical imaging 24 (11), 1428–1440.
- 169 citations: Intensity-based 2-D-3-D registration of cerebral angiograms. John H Hipwell, Graeme P Penney, Robert A McLaughlin, Kawal Rhode, Paul Summers, Tim C Cox, James V Byrne, J Alison Noble, David J Hawkes. IEEE transactions on medical imaging 22 (11), 1417–1426.
