= Titawi =

Coordinates: 29°28′N 77°32′E

- village
- Interactive map of Titawi
- Country: India
- State: Uttar Pradesh
- District: Muzaffarnagar

Languages
  - Official: Hindi & Khadi Bhasa
- Time zone: UTC+5:30 (IST)
- PIN: 251306
- Vehicle registration: UP
- Nearest city: Muzaffarnagar
- Lok Sabha constituency: Muzaffarnagar
- Vidhan Sabha constituency: Baghra
- Website: up.gov.in
- In this village, There are many communities like hindu (Jaat, Kashyap, Harijan, Balmiki, Upadhayay, Julahe, Kumhar & Mushlim etc.)

Titawi is a village in Muzaffarnagar within the Muzaffarnagar district of Uttar Pradesh, India. As of 2006, it had a population of approximately 8,000 within 1,000 households. It is some 15 km from the district headquarters.

== Economy ==
Titawi is developing as an industrial village. Most notable is the Titawi sugar mill. It is conveniently near Baghra, which grows sugarcane. Titawi provides a bus terminal for nearby villages.
