= Kuneru =

Kuneru କୁନେରୁ కునేరు
- Village
- Interactive map of Kuneru
- Location in Orissa, India
- Country: India
- State: Orissa
- District: Rayagada

Area
  - Total: 9.42 km^{2} (3.64 sq mi)

Population (2011)
  - Total: 1,131
  - Density: 120/km^{2} (311/sq mi)

Languages
  - Official: Oriya
- Time zone: UTC+5:30 (IST)

Kuneru is a village in Rayagada district of the Indian state of Orissa. Nagavali River and one of its tributaries converge at the village. The village is peaceful with much greenery, as well as being eco-friendly. It has little development.

== Transport ==
Kuneru railway station is located on Vizianagaram–Raipur mainline in East Coast Railway zone of Indian Railways.

On 21 January 2017, the Hirakhand Express 18448 derailed near Kuneru resulting in at least 39 deaths and more than 200 injuries.
