= Kuneru train derailment =

2017 railway incident in India

Kuneru train derailment କୁନେରୁ ରେଳ ଦୁର୍ଘଟଣା
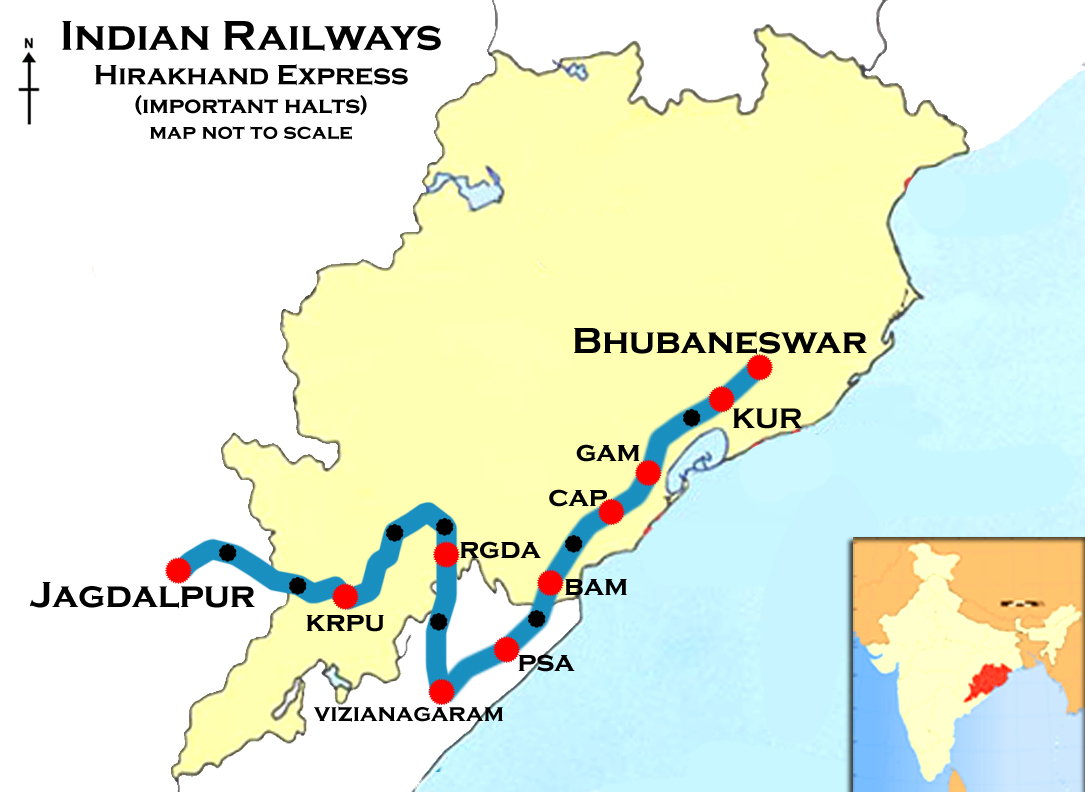
- Scheduled train route Kuneru Station falls between RGDA–VZM.

- Location within Odisha Location within India

Details
- Date: 21 January 2017; 11:00 p.m. local time (16:30 UTC, 21 January)
- Location: Kuneru, Orissa
- Coordinates: 18°57′59″N 83°26′25″E
- Country: India
- Line: Part of Jharsuguda–Vizianagaram line
- Operator: East Coast Railway zone
- Incident type: Derailment
- Cause: Under investigation

Statistics
- Trains: 1
- Passengers: ~600
- Deaths: 41
- Injured: 68

On January 21, 2017, the Hirakhand Express 18448, a scheduled passenger train from Jagdalpur to Bhubaneswar, derailed near the village of Kuneru in Rayagada, Orissa, India, killing 41 people and injuring 68 others. The train was carrying 600 passengers.

== Derailment ==
The diesel engine of the train and nine cars derailed around 11 p.m. local time. Three cars derailed with enough force to leave the roadbed entirely, and some collided with a freight train on a parallel track. According to a district fire department official, some of the casualties were a result of a stampede within the train as passengers tried to flee after the crash. Emergency teams worked intensively to locate and rescue survivors from the crash, said the National railway spokesman Anil Saxena.

== Aftermath ==
The first rescue workers reached the site of the crash 40 minutes after the train derailed. Rescue and recovery work continued until the next day, while repairs to the track were completed by the morning of 23 January. Indian Railways said that it would pay ₹200,000 to the families of those killed in the crash and ₹50,000 to injured passengers, while the government of Odisha announced that it planned to pay ₹500,000 to families of the dead.

== Investigation ==
According to Orissa's then-Chief Minister Naveen Patnaik, investigation of the accident, in conjunction with India's Railway Safety Commissioner, started on January 22. Director General of Police K.B. Singh said there was no evidence of sabotage of the track involved, though unnamed railroad officials had initially hypothesized such.

== See also ==
- Pukhrayan train derailment
- List of deadliest rail accidents
- List of Indian rail incidents
