= Malti Sharma =

Indian politician (1930–2018)

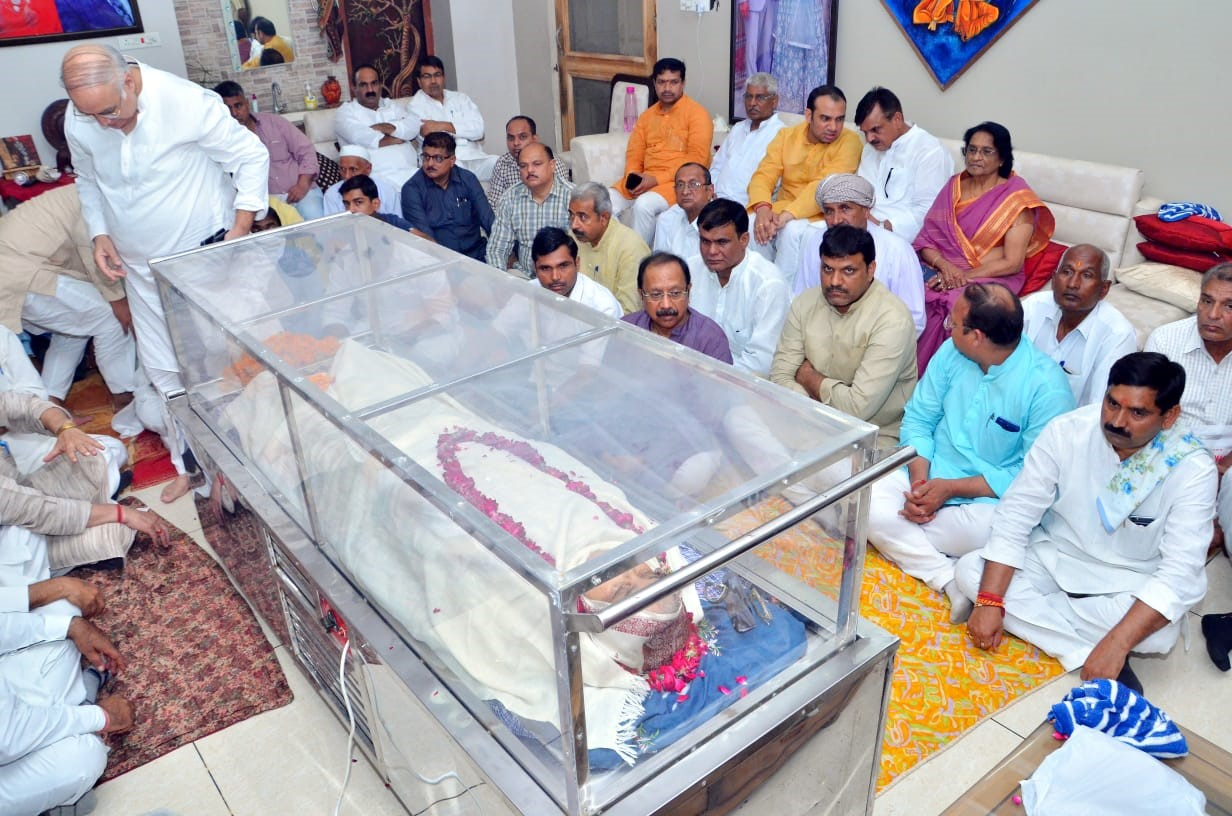

Member of Parliament, Rajya Sabha
- In office 1994–2000
- Constituency: Uttar Pradesh

Personal details
- Born: 30 June 1930 Sonepat, Haryana, British India
- Died: 1 October 2018 (aged 88) Muzaffarnagar, India
- Party: Bharatiya Janata Party
- Spouse: Prof. Bhrama Nand Sharma
- Children: Ashok Kumar Sharma Arvind Kumar Sharma Madhulika Sharma Atul Kumar Sharma

Malti Sharma (30 June 1930 – 1 October 2018) was an Indian politician. She was a Member of Parliament, representing Uttar Pradesh in the Rajya Sabha the upper house of India's Parliament as a member of the Bharatiya Janata Party.

Sharma was among the founding members of Jana Sangh and BJP. Whether it was Jana Sangh or BJP, she was counted among the top women party office bearers of the country. Because of her dedication, she got the spiritual affection from former PM Atal Bihari Vajpayee.

== Early life ==
Malti Sharma was born in Sonepat, Haryana on 30 June 1930. She earned an MA in political science in 1961 after bearing her youngest son Atul Sharma.

== Career ==
Sharma contested for the Jana Sangh and the BJP from 1967 to 1989. She became a founding member of Jana Sangh. In 1977, she became the first MLA in the government of CM Ramnaresh Yadav. She became Deputy Education Minister. Due to some differences, she later resigned from the Cabinet. She was the BJP district president four times. She served as BJP's state president of the women's front. Sharma was active In the BJP central executive for four and a half decades. She served as Vice President and National Vice President.

The party honoured her by making her a Rajya Sabha member in 1994.

From the Charathawal seat, she got a ticket for Randhir Singh twice and the BJP won.

=== Developmental achievements ===
- Sakavi Railway Over Bridge
- Central school in the city
- Making NH-58 a national route
- Reservation window start at railway station

=== Prison ===
During the Emergency, she spent 19 months in Naini Central jail, in 1975.

== Personal life and death ==
Sharma married Brahmanand Sharma, a resident of Badina Kalan, a village in the Baschar area. He was a professor at DAV College and wrote more than 30 books. She had three sons, Ashok, Arvind, and Atul, and a daughter, Madhulika. Ashok and Madhulika predeceased her.

Malti Sharma died in Muzaffarnagar on 1 October 2018, at the age of 88.
