= Budhana =

- Location in Uttar Pradesh, India Budhana (India)
- Coordinates: 29.28°N 77.47°E
- Country: India
- State: Uttar Pradesh
- District: Muzaffarnagar
- Elevation: 231 m (758 ft)

Population (2011)
  - Total: 53,722

Languages
  - Official: Hindi, Urdu
- Time zone: UTC+5:30 (IST)
- PIN: 251309
- Telephone code: 01392
- Vehicle registration: UP-12

Budhana is a town in Muzaffarnagar district in Uttar Pradesh, India.

== History ==
As per Ain-i-Akbari from the late 16th century, Budhana was a pargana under the sarkar of Saharanpur, producing a revenue of 3,698,041 dams for the imperial treasury and supplying a force of 300 infantry and 40 cavalry.

== Demographics ==
As per the 2011 census, Budhana had a population of 53,722 individuals. Males constituted 52.5% (28,180) of the population and females 47.5% (28,180) of the population. The town had a literacy rate of 64.8%.
