= Khatauli =

- Location within Uttar Pradesh Location within India
- Coordinates: 29.276°N 77.731°E
- Country: India
- State: Uttar Pradesh
- District: Muzaffarnagar

Government
  - Body: Khatauli Municipal Corporation
  - Member of Legislative Assembly: Madan Bhaiya (RLD)

Area
  - Total: 438 km^{2} (169 sq mi)
- Elevation: 242 m (794 ft)

Population (2011)
  - Total: 72,949
  - Density: 167/km^{2} (431/sq mi)

Languages
  - Official: Hindi, Urdu, Punjabi, Haryanvi and Khari Boli
- Time zone: UTC+5:30 (IST)
- PIN: 251201
- Telephone code: 91 1396
- Vehicle registration: UP12
- Website: https://www.khatauli.in/

Khatauli is a city and nagar palika in Muzaffarnagar district in the Indian state of Uttar Pradesh. A part of National Capital Region, the town is situated 100 km away from the national capital New Delhi.

Khatauli lies on the National Highway 58 which is an important route for trade and commerce and also a main route for the many Hindu pilgrim places like Haridwar, Rishikesh, Kedarnath, Badrinath and many hill stations like Dehradun, Mussoorie, and Chopta. Khatauli was declared as Tehsil in 2007. The town lies on Delhi - Saharanpur (via Meerut) railway route.

Khatauli came into news because of a train accident on 19 August 2017 caused by human negligence. As many as 14 coaches of the Puri Haridwar Kalinga Utkal Express went off track.

== History ==
Khatauli is listed in the Ain-i-Akbari as a pargana under the sarkar of Saharanpur, producing a revenue of 3,624,588 dams for the imperial treasury and supplying a force of 300 infantry and 40 cavalry.

== Attractions ==
Khatauli's Triveni sugar mill is the largest in Asia in terms of production and storage capacity. The mill has been operational since 1933. Khatauli is a large, rural town and offers some tourist attractions. Khatauli's position on the banks of the upper Ganga canal serves as the area's main tourist attraction. Khatauli is also known for its combination of cultural influences from the Hindu, Muslim, Jain, Christian and Sikh religions. There are nine Jain temples in the town. There is a Mahanubhava sect's lord Krishna's temple near the railway station. There is also a PG College named Shri Kund Kund Jain PG College. Many students complete their higher education and gain respective degrees in several fields every year.

== Demographics ==
As per the 2011 census, Khatauli municipality had a population of 4,33,910 and the urban agglomeration had a population of 1,04,108. The municipality had a sex ratio of 898 females per 1,000 males and 15% of the population were under six years old. Effective literacy was 73%; male literacy was 83% and female literacy was 63%.

The tehsil has 70% Hindus, 25% Muslims,4% Sikhs, 0.2% Christians and 0.8% Jains.

Khatauli is governed by a municipal council. The city's population is 4,33,910; the urban population is 1,04,108, of which 54,756 are males and 49,352 are females. The majority of the population speaks Hindi.

Voting: There are approximately 50,000 Dalits in Khatauli assembly seat.

== See also ==
- 2017 Khatauli train derailment
