= Muzaffarnagar district =

- District of Uttar Pradesh
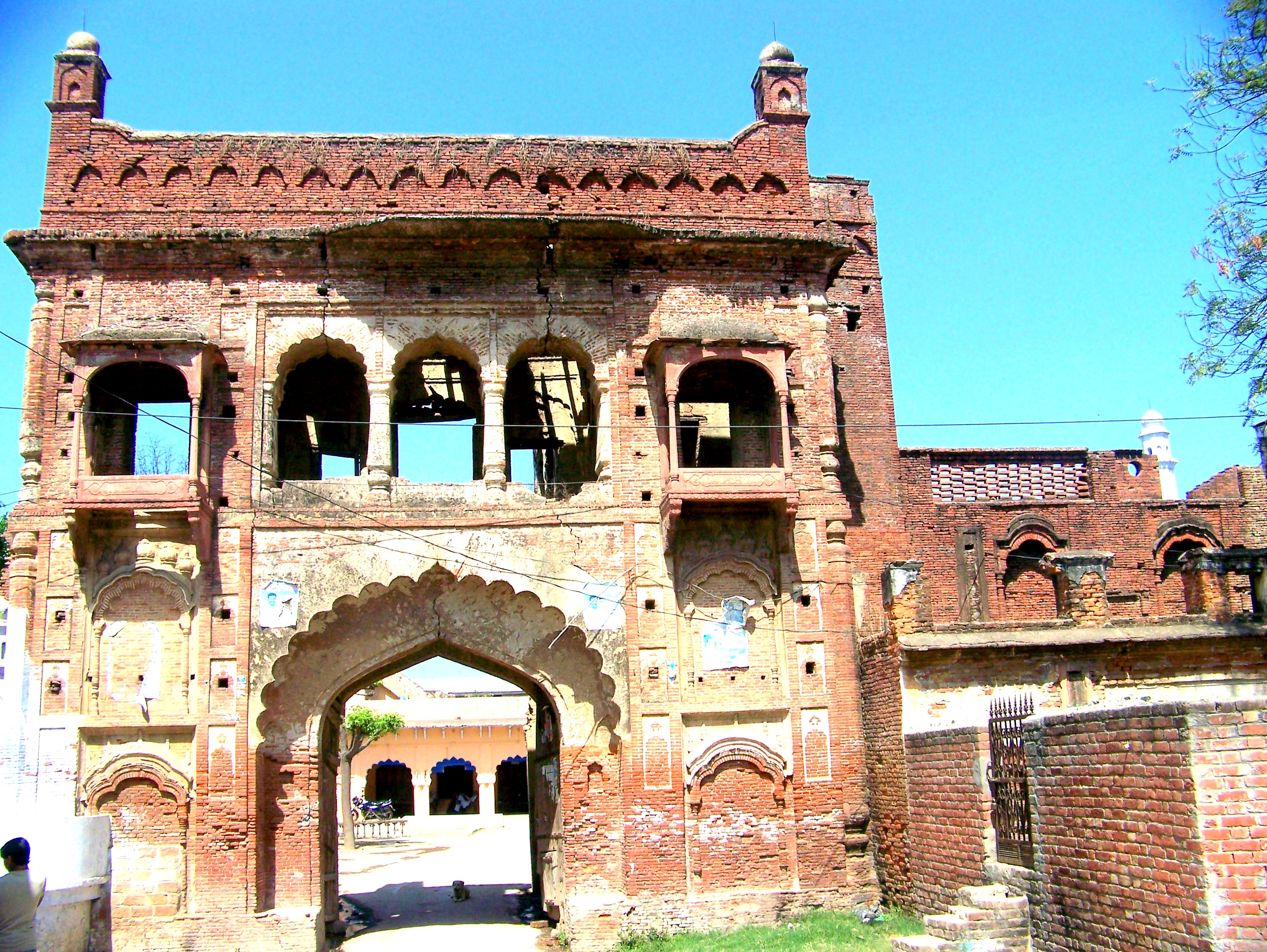
- Bada Darwaza in Kakrouli village

- Location of Muzaffarnagar district in Uttar Pradesh
- Coordinates (Muzaffarnagar): 29°28′16″N 77°42′11″E
- Country: India
- State: Uttar Pradesh
- Division: Saharanpur
- Headquarters: Muzaffarnagar
- Tehsils: Sadar, Budhana, Jansath, Khatauli

Government
  - Lok Sabha constituencies: Muzaffarnagar
  - Vidhan Sabha constituencies: Muzaffarnagar, Budhana, Charthawal, Khatauli, Meerapur, Purqazi

Area
  - Total: 2,991 km^{2} (1,155 sq mi)

Population (2011)
  - Total: 2,869,934
  - Density: 959.5/km^{2} (2,485/sq mi)

Demographics
  - Literacy: 69.12 per cent
  - Sex ratio: 889/1000
- Time zone: UTC+05:30 (IST)
- PIN: 251 3xx
- Vehicle registration: UP-12
- Major highways: NH 334 NH 709AD SH59, SH12A
- Website: muzaffarnagar.nic.in

Muzaffarnagar district (Hindi pronunciation: [mʊzəfːəɾ.nəgəɾ], also [mʊd͡ʒəp.pʰəɾ.nəgəɾ]) is a district of Uttar Pradesh state in northern India. It is part of Saharanpur division. The city of Muzaffarnagar is the district headquarters. This district is the part of National Capital Region. Muzaffarnagar district is located north western Uttar Pradesh.

== History ==
=== Medieval period ===
Muzaffarnagar's early medieval history is obscure till the Indo-Mughal period. Timur's army had marched to Delhi through this region in 1399; its people fought it unsuccessfully. In Mughal Emperor Akbar's time, most of the Muzaffarnagar district region, called Sarwat then under the Mahal control of Tagas / Tyagis of Sarvat village, belonged to the sarkar (circle) of Saharanpur. Akbar bestowed pargana of Sarwat on Sayyed Mahmud Khan Barha which remained with his descendants up to the 17th century. Munawwar Lashkar Khan Barha established the city and named it Muzaffarnagar in honour of his father, Sayyid Muzaffar Khan, otherwise known as Khan-i-Jahan during the reign of Shah Jahan, after which Sarwat also became Muzaffarnagar. At the time Muzaffarnagar was part of the Barah country as it was intimately connected with the Indian Muslim kinship group called the Barah Sayyids, who controlled the upper Doab. The Indian Muslim inhabitants of Barah, especially from near the town of Jansath, were heavily recruited in the Army of the Mughal Empire, where they had a hereditary right to lead the vanguard of the imperial troops in every battle. The unique privilege of the Barah Sayyids of leading the imperial vanguard also gave them an advantage over other parts of the Mughal military and exalted their sense of social pride. They also made up the personal cavalry of the Sayyid Brothers, both from Muzaffarnagar, who were de facto rulers of the Mughal Empire in the 1710s.

=== Modern era ===
Muzaffarnagar district gained notoriety in the 20th century with frequent incidents of loot, murders, kidnappings and dacoity.

== Blocks ==
The district is divided into 9 blocks, these are:

Sr. No.	Block Name
1	Muzaffarnagar Sadar
2	Budhana
3	Baghra
4	Shahpur
5	Purquazi
6	Charthawal
7	Morna
8	Jansath
9	Khatauli

== Demographics ==
Historical population
Year	Pop.	±% p.a.
1901	867,177	—
1911	799,331	−0.81%
1921	786,187	−0.17%
1931	885,877	+1.20%
1941	1,046,382	+1.68%
1951	1,209,771	+1.46%
1961	1,429,961	+1.69%
1971	1,781,579	+2.22%
1981	2,248,483	+2.35%
1991	2,842,543	+2.37%
2001	3,543,362	+2.23%
2011	4,143,512	+1.58%

According to the 2011 census Muzaffarnagar district has a population of 4,143,512 roughly equal to the nation of Lebanon or the US state of Oregon. This gives it a ranking of 125th in India (out of a total of 640). The district has a population density of 960 inhabitants per square kilometre (2,500/sq mi) . Its population growth rate over the decade 2001-2011 was 16.8%. Muzaffarnagar has a sex ratio of 886 females for every 1000 males, and a literacy rate of 70.11%. Minority population is about 40% of the total population of the district.

Religions in residual Muzaffarnagar district (2011)
Religion	Percent
Hinduism	57.70%
Islam	41.11%
Jainism	0.43%
Other or not stated	0.76%
Distribution of religions

The divided district had population 2,869,934 and a sex ratio of 893 females per 1000 males. 805,210 (28.06%) lived in urban areas. Scheduled Castes made up 419,987 (14.63%) of the population respectively.

Languages of residual Muzaffarnagar district (2011)
1. Hindi (86.3%)
2. Urdu (13.3%)
3. Others (0.43%)

At the time of the 2011 Census of India, 86.28% of the population of the district spoke Hindi and 13.29% Urdu as their first language.

== Education ==
- Muzaffarnagar Medical College, affiliate of Chaudhary Charan Singh University
- Shree Ram group of college
- Sd group of college
- Dav degree college

== Villages ==
- Adampur Mouchri
- Jamalpur Bangar
- Mahaljana
- Rohana Khurd
- Jarauda
- Sujru

== Town ==
- Sisauli
- Khatauli
- Jansath
- Shahpur
- Budhana
- Miranpur
