= Ranjit Singh (disambiguation) =

Ranjit Singh of Punjab (1780–1839) was the founder and first maharaja of the Sikh Empire.

Ranjit Singh or Ranjeet Singh may also refer to:

== Given name ==
- Ranjit Singh of Bharatpur (1745–1805), maharaja of the Bharatpur princely state in Rajasthan, India
- Ranjeet Singh (Indian politician) (1934–2019)
- Ranjit Singh (Odisha cricketer) (born 1994), Indian cricketer
- Ranjeet Singh (Pakistani politician)
- Ranjit Singh (politician), Indian politician
- Ranjit Singh (race walker) (born 1957), Indian Olympic race walker
- Ranjit Singh (runner), Indian 800m runner
- Ranjit Singh (volleyball), Indian volleyball player
- Ranjit Singh of Bundi
- Ranjit Singh (ruler) (1888–1930), Rana of Barwani

== Films and television ==
- Maharaja Ranjit Singh (TV series), Indian television show
- Sher-e-Punjab: Maharaja Ranjit Singh, Indian television show
- Ranjit Singh (How I Met Your Mother character), fictional character in How I Met Your Mother
- Ranjit Singh, a series of crime fiction novels by British Indian writer A A Dhand
- Ranjit Singh Lobo, fictional character in the 1981 Indian film Bulundi, played by Danny Denzongpa
- Thakur Ranjit Singh, fictional character in the 1973 Indian film Dhund, played by Danny Denzongpa
- Major Ranjit Singh Gurung, fictional Indian Army major portrayed by Danny Denzongpa in the 1998 Indian film China Gate

== See also ==
- Ranjit, an Indian male given name
  - Ranjeet (given name), alternative form of the male given name
  - Ranjith, another alternative form of the male given name
- Singh, an Indian surname
- Ranjeeta (disambiguation), feminine form of the given name
- Ranjitsinhji (1872–1933), maharaja of the Indian princely state of Nawanagar from 1907 to 1933
- Ranj Singh (born 1979), British-Indian doctor and TV presenter
- Ranjit Singh Boparan (born 1966), British-Indian businessman
- Ranjit Singh Chautala (born 1945), Indian politician
- Ranjit Singh Dyal (1928–2012), Indian army officer and administrator
- Ranjeet Singh Judeo, Indian politician
