= 1980 Uttar Pradesh Legislative Assembly election =

1980 Uttar Pradesh legislative assembly election
- 28 and 31 May 1980

All 425 seats of Uttar Pradesh Legislative Assembly 213 seats needed for a majority
- Turnout: 57.13%
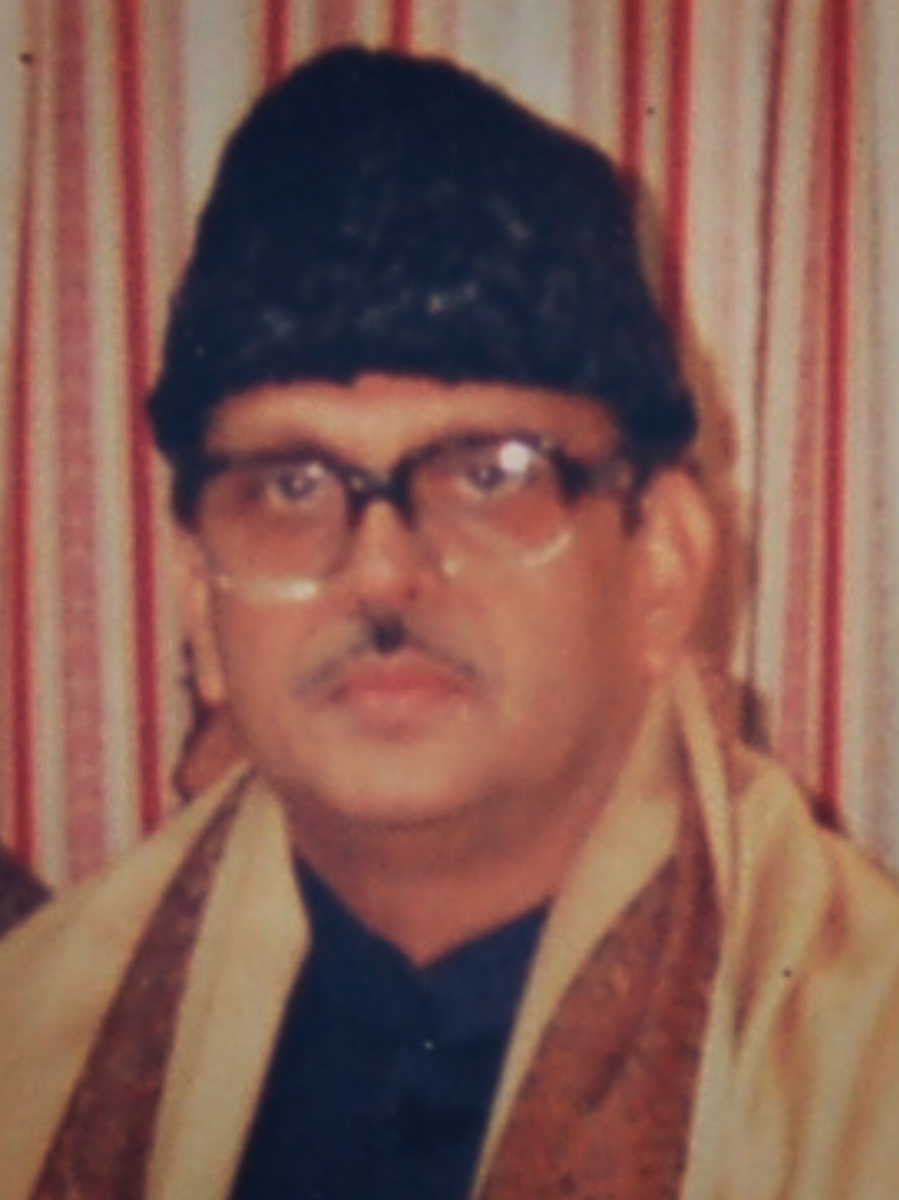

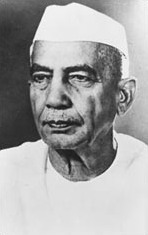

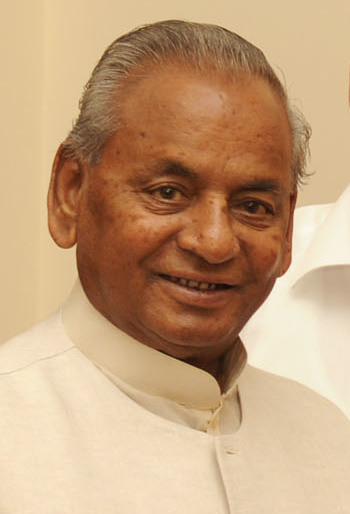
	Majority party	Minority party
Leader	V. P. Singh	Charan Singh
Party	INC	JP(S)
Alliance	INC+	JP(S)+
Leader's seat	Tindwari
Last election	47	New
Seats won	309	59
Seat change	▲262	New
Popular vote	9,720,767	5,554,778
Percentage	37.65%	21.51%
Swing	▲5.74%	New
	Third party	Fourth party
	INC (U)
Leader		Kalyan Singh
Party	INC(U)	BJP
Alliance	INC(U)+	BJP+
Last election	New	New
Seats won	13	11
Seat change	New	New
Popular vote	1,648,406	2,777,731
Percentage	6.38%	10.76%
Swing	New	New
Chief Minister before election
President's Rule
Elected Chief Minister
V. P. Singh
Indian National Congress

Legislative Assembly elections were held in Uttar Pradesh in May 1980. The Indian National Congress remained the largest party, winning 309 of the 425 seats.

The elections were held after President Neelam Sanjiva Reddy ordered the imposition of President's rule in the state on the advice of the Fourth Indira Gandhi ministry, which acted on basis that the victory of the Indian National Congress in the 1980 Indian general election proved that the state government no longer reflected the will of the pepule. These outset Banarasi Das-led Janata Party Government. Das joined Charan Singh's Janata Party (Secular) following the split in the Janata party.

== Results ==
Party	Votes	%	Seats	
Party	Votes	%	Won	Contested
Indian National Congress	9,720,767	37.65	309	424
Janata Party (Secular)	5,554,778	21.51	59	399
Bharatiya Janata Party	2,777,731	10.76	11	400
Indian National Congress (U)	1,648,406	6.38	13	339
Janata Party (Secular) Raj Narain	1,076,181	4.17	4	302
Communist Party of India	917,773	3.55	7	155
Janata Party (JP)	745,549	2.89	4	239
Communist Party of India (Marxist)	122,162	0.47	–	18
Lokdal	69,086	0.27	–	4
Soshit Samaj Dal (Akhil Bharatiya)	52,579	0.20	1	23
Republican Party of India (Khobragade)	41,779	0.16	–	26
Muslim Majlis	11,898	0.05	–	3
Republican Party of India (Kamble)	4,029	0.02	–	1
Janta Party	3,064	0.01	–	2
All India Forward Bloc	2,712	0.01	–	10
Akhil Bharatiya Ram Rajya Parishad	2,120	0.01	–	4
Republican Party of India	2,000	0.01	–	2
Bharatiya Socialist Party	956	0.00	–	1
Independent	3,064,703	11.87	17	2267
Total	25,818,273	100.00	425	4619
Valid votes	25,818,273	98.21		
Invalid/blank votes	470,401	1.79		
Total votes	26,288,674	100.00		
Registered voters/turnout	58,520,466	44.92		

== Elected members ==
Constituency	Reserved for (SC/ST/None)	Member	Party
Uttarkashi	SC	Baldev Singh Arya	Independent
Tehri	None	Khushal Singh Rangarh	Indian National Congress
Deoprayag	None	Vidyasagar Nautiyal	Communist Party of India
Lansdowne	None	Chandra Mohan Singh Negi	Indian National Congress
Pauri	None	Narendra Singh Bhandari	Independent
Karanprayag	None	Shiva Nand Nautiyal	Independent
Badrikedar	None	Kunwar Singh Negi	Independent
Didihat	None	Charu Chandra Ojha	Indian National Congress
Pithoragarh	None	Narendra Singh Bisht	Indian National Congress
Almora	None	Gobardhan	Indian National Congress
Bageswar	SC	Gopal Ram Das	Indian National Congress
Ranikhet	None	Jaswant Singh Bist	Independent
Nainital	None	Shiv Narain Singh Negi	Indian National Congress
Khatima	SC	Bihari Lal	Indian National Congress
Haldwani	None	Akbar Ahmad	Indian National Congress
Kashipur	None	Satendra Chandra Guriya	Indian National Congress
Seohara	None	Sheo Nath Singh	Indian National Congress
Dhampur	None	Thakur Shyam Singh	Janata Party
Afzalgarh	None	Thamman Singh	Bharatiya Janata Party
Nagina	SC	Bishan Lal	Indian National Congress
Nazibabad	SC	Rati Ram	Indian National Congress
Bijnor	None	Azizur Rahman	Indian National Congress
Chandpur	None	Ameer Uddin	Indian National Congress
Kanth	None	Ram Kishan	Indian National Congress
Amroha	None	Khursheed Ahmad	Indian National Congress
Hasanpur	None	Rais Uddin Warsi	Janata Party
Gangeshwari	SC	Jitender Pal Singh	Indian National Congress
Sambhal	None	Shariyatulla	Indian National Congress
Bahjoi	None	Sultan Singh	Janata Party
Chandausi	SC	Jiraj Singh Moria	Indian National Congress
Kundarki	None	Akbar Hussain	Janata Party
Moradabad West	None	Rajpal Singh	Indian National Congress
Moradabad	None	Hafiz Mohammad Siddiq	Indian National Congress
Moradabad Rural	None	Riasat Husain	Independent
Thakurdwara	None	Ram Pal Singh S/o Bhagwant Singh	Indian National Congress
Suartanda	None	Balbir Singh	Bharatiya Janata Party
Rampur	None	Mohd. Azam Khan	Janata Party
Bilaspur	None	Chanchal Singh	Indian National Congress
Shahabad	SC	Banshi Dhar	Indian National Congress
Bisauli	None	Babu Brij Ballabh	Indian National Congress
Gunnaur	None	Prem Wati	Janata Party
Sahaswan	None	Meer Mizhar Ali	Indian National Congress
Bilsi	SC	Kesho Ram	Indian National Congress
Budaun	None	Shrikrishana Goel	Indian National Congress
Usehat	None	Fakhre Alam	Indian National Congress
Binawar	None	Abrar Ahmad	Indian National Congress
Dataganj	None	Santosh Kumari	Indian National Congress
Aonla	None	Kalyan Singh	Indian National Congress
Sunha	None	Rameshwar Nath Chaubey	Indian National Congress
Faridpur	SC	Nand Ram	Bharatiya Janata Party
Bareilly Cantonment	None	Ashfaq Ahmad	Indian National Congress
Bareilly City	None	Ram Singh Khanna	Indian National Congress
Nawabganj	None	Chet Ram Gangwar (pachpera)	Independent
Bhojipura	None	Bhanu Pratap Singh	Indian National Congress
Kabar	None	Jai Deep Singh	Independent
Baheri	None	Amba Prasad	Independent
Pilibhit	None	Charan Jit Singh	Indian National Congress
Barkhera	SC	Baboo Ram	Indian National Congress
Bisalpur	None	Tej Bahadur	Indian National Congress
Puranpur	None	Vinod Kumar	Indian National Congress
Powayan	SC	Roop Ram	Indian National Congress
Nigohi	None	Jagdish Singh	Indian National Congress
Tilhar	None	Satya Pal Singh	Janata Party
Jalalabad	None	Udai Vir Singh	Indian National Congress
Dadraul	None	Nazir Ali	Janata Party
Shahjahanpur	None	Nawab Sadiq Ali Khan	Indian National Congress
Mohammadi	SC	Banshi Dhar Raj	Indian National Congress
Haiderabad	None	Ram Bhajan Lal	Indian National Congress
Paila	SC	Chheda Lal Chaudhry	Indian National Congress
Lakhimpur	None	Zafar Ali Naqvi	Indian National Congress
Srinagar	None	Upendra Bahadur Singh Alias Suttan Bhayya	Indian National Congress
Nighasan	None	Satish Ajmani	Indian National Congress
Dhaurehara	None	Taaj Narain Trivedi	Independent
Behta	None	Mukhtar Anis	Janata Party
Biswan	None	Ram Kumar Bhargava	Indian National Congress
Mahmoodabad	None	Ammar Rizvi	Indian National Congress
Sidhauli	SC	Ram Lal	Bharatiya Janata Party
Laharpur	None	Hargovind Verma	Janata Party
Sitapur	None	Rajendra Kumar Gupta	Bharatiya Janata Party
Hargaon	SC	Paragi Lal Chaudhari	Indian National Congress
Misrikh	None	Ram Ratan Singh	Indian National Congress
Machhrihta	SC	Virendra Kumar Chaudhary	Indian National Congress
Beniganj	None	Ram Lal Verma	Indian National Congress
Sandila	None	Kudasiya Begam	Indian National Congress
Ahirori	SC	Parmai Lal	Bharatiya Janata Party
Hardoi	None	Naresh Chandra	Indian National Congress
Bawan	SC	Natthu Lal	Indian National Congress
Pihani	None	Kamla Devi	Indian National Congress
Shahabad	None	Ram Autar Dixit	Indian National Congress
Bilgram	None	Hari Shankar	Indian National Congress
Mallawan	None	Ram Asrey Verma	Independent
Bangarmau	None	Gopi Nath Dixit	Indian National Congress
Safipur	SC	Har Prasad	Indian National Congress
Unnao	None	Sheo Pal Singh	Janata Party
Hadha	None	Sachchida Nand	Indian National Congress
Bhagwant Nagar	None	Bhagwati Singh Visharad	Indian National Congress
Purwa	None	Gaya Singh	Indian National Congress
Hasanganj	SC	Bhikha Lal	Communist Party of India
Malihabad	SC	Baij Nath Kureel	Indian National Congress
Mohana	None	Chandra Shekhar Trivedi	Indian National Congress
Lucknow East	None	Swarup Kumari Bakhshi	Indian National Congress
Lucknow West	None	Kanhaiya Lal Mahendru	Indian National Congress
Lucknow Central	None	Mohammad Rafi Siddiqui	Indian National Congress
Lucknow Cantonment	None	Premvati Tivari	Indian National Congress
Sarojini Nagar	None	Vijai Kumar	Indian National Congress
Mohanlalganj	SC	Sant Bux Rawat	Janata Party
Bachhrawan	SC	Sheo Darshan	Indian National Congress
Tiloi	None	Haji Mohd. Wasim	Indian National Congress
Rae Bareli	None	Ramesh Chandra	Indian National Congress
Sataon	None	Krishna Kumar	Indian National Congress
Sareni	None	Sunita Chauhan	Indian National Congress
Dalmau	None	Har Narain Singh	Indian National Congress
Salon	SC	Sheo Balak	Indian National Congress
Kunda	None	Niaz Hasan Khan	Indian National Congress
Bihar	SC	Sarjoo Prasad Saroj	Indian National Congress
Rampurkhas	None	Pramod Kumar	Indian National Congress
Gadwara	None	Ram Naresh Shukla	Indian National Congress
Pratapgarh	None	Lal Pratap Singh	Indian National Congress
Birapur	None	Prabhakar Nath Dwevedi	Indian National Congress
Patti	None	Vasudeo Singh	Indian National Congress
Amethi	None	Rajkumar Sanjay Singh	Indian National Congress
Gauriganj	None	Rajpati Devi	Indian National Congress
Jagdishpur	SC	Ram Sewak	Indian National Congress
Issauli	None	Shreepat Misra	Indian National Congress
Sultanpur	None	Moid Ahmad	Indian National Congress
Jaisinghpur	None	Devendra Pandey	Indian National Congress
Chanda	None	Ram Singh	Indian National Congress
Kadipur	SC	Jairaj Gautam	Indian National Congress
Katehri	None	Jiya Ram Shukul Vikal Saketi	Indian National Congress
Akbarpur	None	Priya Darshi Jetli	Indian National Congress
Jalalpur	None	Sher Bahadur	Indian National Congress
Jahangirganj	SC	Ram Ji Ram	Indian National Congress
Tanda	None	Gopi Nath Verma	Janata Party
Ayodhya	None	Nirmal Kumar	Indian National Congress
Bikapur	None	Sita Ram Nishad	Indian National Congress
Milkipur	None	Mitra Sen	Communist Party of India
Sohawal	SC	Madho Prasad	Indian National Congress
Rudauli	None	Pradeep Kumar Yadav	Janata Party
Dariyabad	None	Krishna Magan Singh	Indian National Congress
Siddhaur	None	Ram Sagar	Janata Party
Haidergarh	None	Shyam Lal Bajpai	Indian National Congress
Masauli	None	Rizvanur Rahman	Indian National Congress
Nawabganj	None	Parwati Devi	Janata Party
Fatehpur	SC	Jamuna Prasad	Janata Party
Ramnagar	None	Gajendra Singh	Indian National Congress
Kaiserganj	None	Sunder Singh	Indian National Congress
Fakharpur	None	Ram Harsh Misra	Indian National Congress
Mahsi	None	Indra Pratap Singh (lallu)	Indian National Congress
Nanpara	None	Jata Shanker Singh	Bharatiya Janata Party
Charda	SC	Devi Prasad	Indian National Congress
Bhinga	None	Khurshed Ahmad	Independent
Bahraich	None	Dharam Pal	Bharatiya Janata Party
Ikauna	SC	Raj Kishore Rao	Indian National Congress
Gainsari	None	Aqbal Husain	Indian National Congress
Tulsipur	None	Mangal Deo	Indian National Congress
Balrampur	None	Man Bahadur	Indian National Congress
Utraula	None	Masroor Zafri	Communist Party of India
Sadulla Nagar	None	Mohd. Umar	Indian National Congress
Mankapur	SC	Chhedi Lal	Indian National Congress
Mujehna	None	Deep Narain Don	Indian National Congress
Gonda	None	Raghu Raj Prasad Upadhaya	Indian National Congress
Katra Bazar	None	Murli Dhar Devedi	Indian National Congress
Colonelganj	None	Umeshwar Pratap Singh	Indian National Congress
Dixir	SC	Babu Lal	Indian National Congress
Harraiya	None	Surendra Pratap Narain	Indian National Congress
Captainganj	None	Ambika Singh	Indian National Congress
Nagar East	SC	Ram Audh Prasad	Indian National Congress
Basti	None	Almeloo Ammal	Indian National Congress
Ramnagar	None	Parmatma Pd. Singh	Indian National Congress
Domariaganj	None	Kamal Yusuf	Janata Party
Itwa	None	Mata Prasad Pandey	Janata Party
Shohratgarh	None	Kamla Sahani	Indian National Congress
Naugarh	None	Mathura Prasad Panday	Indian National Congress
Bansi	None	Dina Nath	Indian National Congress
Khesraha	None	Diwakar Vikram Singh	Janata Party
Menhdawal	None	Modh. Navi Khan	Indian National Congress
Khalilabad	None	Ram Asrey Paswan	Janata Party
Hainsarbazar	SC	Genda Devi	Indian National Congress
Bansgaon	SC	Kailash Prasad	Indian National Congress
Dhuriapar	None	Markandey Chand	Indian National Congress
Chillupar	None	Bhrigu Nath	Indian National Congress
Kauriram	None	Gauri Devi	Janata Party
Mundera Bazar	SC	Panney Lal	Indian National Congress
Pipraich	None	Kedar Nath Singh	Indian National Congress
Gorakhpur	None	Sunil Shastri	Indian National Congress
Maniram	None	Hari Dwar Pandey	Indian National Congress
Sahjanwa	None	Kishori Shukla	Indian National Congress
Paniara	None	Bir Bahadur Singh	Indian National Congress
Pharenda	None	Shyam Narain Tiwari	Independent
Luxmipur	None	Virendra Pratap Sahi	Independent
Siswa	None	Yadvendra Singh (lallan Ji)	Indian National Congress
Maharajganj	SC	Phirangi Prasad Visharad	Janata Party
Shyamdeurwa	None	Janardan Pd. Ojha	Janata Party
Naurangia	SC	Mahesh Prasad	Indian National Congress
Ramkola	None	Sugraw Singh	Indian National Congress
Hata	SC	Kuber	Janata Party
Padrauna	None	Brij Kishore	Indian National Congress
Seorahi	None	Dhrup Rai	Indian National Congress
Fazilnagar	None	Khudadin Ansari	Indian National Congress
Kasia	None	Raj Mangal Pandey	Indian National Congress
Gauri Bazar	None	Nand Kishore Singh	Janata Party
Rudrapur	None	Bhasker Pandey	Indian National Congress
Deoria	None	Rudra Pratap	Janata Party
Bhatpar Rani	None	Haribansh Sahai	Janata Party
Salempur	None	Durga Prasad Misra	Bharatiya Janata Party
Barhaj	None	Mohan Singh	Janata Party
Nathupur	None	Raj Kumar	Indian National Congress
Ghosi	None	Kedar	Indian National Congress
Sagri	None	Panchanan	Indian National Congress
Gopalpur	None	Dal Singar	Indian National Congress
Azamgarh	None	Ram Kunwar Singh	Indian National Congress
Nizamabad	None	Chandra Bali Bramchari	Indian National Congress
Atraulia	None	Shambhu Nath	Indian National Congress
Phulpur	None	Abul Kalam	Indian National Congress
Saraimir	SC	Lalsa	Indian National Congress
Mehnagar	SC	Deepu	Indian National Congress
Lalganj	None	Triveni	Indian National Congress
Mubarakpur	None	Doodhnath	Indian National Congress
Muhammadabad Gohna	SC	Tapeshwar	Communist Party of India
Mau	None	Khairul Bashar	Independent
Rasra	SC	Hardeva	Indian National Congress
Siar	None	Babban Singh	Indian National Congress
Chilkahar	None	Ram Govind	Janata Party
Sikanderpur	None	Nirbhai Narain Singh Alias Lalbaboo	Indian National Congress
Bansdih	None	Bachcha Pathak	Indian National Congress
Doaba	None	Bhola Pandey	Indian National Congress
Ballia	None	Kashi Nath Misra	Indian National Congress
Kopachit	None	Gauri Shanker Bhaiya	Janata Party
Zahoorabad	None	Surendra Singh	Indian National Congress
Mohammadabad	None	Vijai Shankar Singh	Indian National Congress
Dildarnagar	None	Ram Harsh	Indian National Congress
Zamania	None	Saheb Singh	Indian National Congress
Ghazipur	None	Ram Narain	Janata Party
Jakhania	SC	Jhilmit Ram	Indian National Congress
Sadat	SC	Ram Dhani	Janata Party
Saidpur	None	Ramkaran	Janata Party
Dhanapur	None	Ram Janam	Indian National Congress
Chandauli	SC	Shankatha Prasad Shastri	Indian National Congress
Chakiya	SC	Kharpat Ram	Indian National Congress
Mughalsarai	None	Ramchandra	Indian National Congress
Varanasi Cantonment	None	Mandavi Prasad Singh	Indian National Congress
Varanasi South	None	Kailash Tondon	Indian National Congress
Varanasi North	None	Mohd. Shafirahman Ansari	Indian National Congress
Chiraigaon	None	Sri Nath Singh	Indian National Congress
Kolasla	None	Udal	Communist Party of India
Gangapur	None	Dhaneshwri Devi	Indian National Congress
Aurai	None	Yogesh Chandra	Indian National Congress
Gyanpur	None	Bridhi Narain	Indian National Congress
Bhadohi	SC	Banwari Ram	Indian National Congress
Barasathi	None	Ram Krishna	Indian National Congress
Mariahu	None	Surya Nath	Indian National Congress
Kerakat	SC	Ram Samujhawan	Indian National Congress
Bayalsi	None	Prabhu Narain Singh	Indian National Congress
Jaunpur	None	Kamla Prasad Singh	Indian National Congress
Rari	None	Tej Bahadur	Indian National Congress
Shahganj	SC	Pahlwan	Indian National Congress
Kuhutahan	None	Jang Bahadur	Indian National Congress
Garwara	None	Ram Shiromani	Indian National Congress
Machhlishahr	None	Keshri Prasad	Indian National Congress
Dudhi	SC	Vijai Singh	Indian National Congress
Robertsganj	SC	Kalloo Ram	Indian National Congress
Rajgarh	None	Ram Charan	Indian National Congress
Chunar	None	Yadu Nath	Janata Party
Majhwa	None	Lokpati	Indian National Congress
Mirzapur	None	Azahar Imam	Indian National Congress
Chhanbey	SC	Purshottam	Indian National Congress
Meja	SC	Vishram Das	Indian National Congress
Karchana	None	Krishna Prakash Tewari	Indian National Congress
Bara	None	Rama Kant Misra	Indian National Congress
Jhusi	None	Baij Nath Prasad Kushwaha	Janata Party
Handia	None	Ranendra Tripathi	Indian National Congress
Pratappur	None	Shyam Surat Upadhyaya	Indian National Congress
Soraon	None	Radhey Shyam Patel	Janata Party
Nawabganj	None	Mohd. Amin	Indian National Congress
Allahabad North	None	Ashok Kumar Bajpai	Indian National Congress
Allahabad South	None	Satish Chandra Jaiswal	Indian National Congress
Allahabad West	None	Chaudhary Naunihal Singh	Indian National Congress
Chail	SC	Vijay Prakash	Indian National Congress
Manjhanpur	SC	Ishwar Sharan Vidyarathi	Indian National Congress
Sirathu	None	Jagdish Prasad	Indian National Congress
Khaga	None	Krishna Dutt Alias Balraj	Indian National Congress
Kishunpur	SC	Indrajit	Indian National Congress
Haswa	None	Amar Nath Singh Alias Anil Singh	Indian National Congress
Fatehpur	None	Khan Ghufran Zahidi	Indian National Congress
Jahanabad	None	Jagdish Narain	Indian National Congress
Bindki	None	Ram Pyare Pandey	Indian National Congress
Aryanagar	None	Abdul Rahman Khan Nashtar	Indian National Congress
Sisamau	SC	Kamla Dariyabadi	Indian National Congress
Generalganj	None	Suman Lata Dixit	Indian National Congress
Kanpur Cantonment	None	Bhudhar Narain Misra	Indian National Congress
Govind Nagar	None	Wilayati Ram Katiyal	Indian National Congress
Kalyanpur	None	Ram Narain Pathak	Indian National Congress
Sarsaul	None	Devendra Bahadur Singh	Indian National Congress
Ghatampur	None	Kunwar Shiv Nath Kushwaha	Indian National Congress
Bhognipur	SC	Ganga Sagar Sankhwar	Indian National Congress
Rajpur	None	Ram Swaroop Verma	Shoshit Samaj Dal
Sarvankhera	None	Ajit Kumar Singh	Indian National Congress
Chaubepur	None	Harikishan Srivastava	Janata Party
Bilhaur	SC	Moti Lal Dehlvi	Janata Party
Derapur	None	Bhagwan Din Kushwaha	Janata Party
Auraiya	None	Dhani Ram Verma	Janata Party
Ajitmal	SC	Gauri Shanker	Indian National Congress
Lakhana	SC	Maharani Dohre	Indian National Congress
Etawah	None	Sukhda Misra	Indian National Congress
Jaswantnagar	None	Balram Singh Yadava	Indian National Congress
Bharthana	None	Gore Lal Shakya	Indian National Congress
Bidhuna	None	Gajendra Singh	Indian National Congress
Kannauj	SC	Behari Lal Dohare	Indian National Congress
Umarda	None	Kunwar Yogendra Singh	Indian National Congress
Chhibramau	None	Radhey Shyam Verma	Janata Party
Kamalganj	None	Balbir Singh	Bharatiya Janata Party
Farrukhabad	None	Vimal Prasad Tiwari	Indian National Congress
Kaimganj	None	Anwar Md. Khan	Janata Party
Mohammdabad	None	Rajendra Singh Yadav	Indian National Congress
Manikpur	SC	Shiromani	Indian National Congress
Karwi	None	Shive Naresh	Indian National Congress
Baberu	None	Rameshwar Prasad	Indian National Congress
Tindwari	None	Shiv Pratap Singh	Indian National Congress
Banda	None	Chandra Prakash Sharam	Indian National Congress
Naraini	None	Harbansh Prasad Pandey	Indian National Congress
Hamirpur	None	Pratap Narain	Indian National Congress
Maudaha	None	Kunwar Bahadur Misra	Indian National Congress
Rath	None	Swami Prasad Singh	Indian National Congress
Charkhari	SC	Mohan Lal	Indian National Congress
Mahoba	None	Baboo Lal	Independent
Mehroni	None	Sujan Singh Bundela	Indian National Congress
Lalitpur	None	Om Prakash Richhariya	Indian National Congress
Jhansi	None	Rajendra Agnihotri	Bharatiya Janata Party
Babina	SC	Beni Bai	Indian National Congress
Mauranipur	SC	Bhagi Rath	Indian National Congress
Garautha	None	Ranjit Singh Joo Deo	Indian National Congress
Konch	SC	Ramprasad	Indian National Congress
Orai	None	Suresh Datt Paliwal	Indian National Congress
Kalpi	None	Shankar Singh	Janata Party
Madhogarh	None	Dalganjan Singh	Janata Party
Bhongara	None	Subedar Singh S/o Chironji	Indian National Congress
Kishni	SC	Munshi Lal	Indian National Congress
Karhal	None	Sheo Mangal Singh	Indian National Congress
Shikohabad	None	Jagdish Singh	Indian National Congress
Jasrana	None	Vishun Dayal Verma	Indian National Congress
Ghiror	None	Lalloo Singh Chauhan	Communist Party of India
Mainpuri	None	Raghuvir Singh Yadav	Indian National Congress
Aliganj	None	Latoori Singh	Janata Party
Patiali	None	Malik Mohammed Jamir Ahmed	Indian National Congress
Sakit	None	Netrapal Singh	Indian National Congress
Soron	None	Urmila Agnihotri	Indian National Congress
Kasganj	None	Manpal Singh Advocate	Indian National Congress
Etah	None	Kailash Chandra	Indian National Congress
Nidhauli Kalan	None	Hansraj	Indian National Congress
Jalesar	SC	Ram Singh	Indian National Congress
Firozabad	None	Ghulam Nabi	Indian National Congress
Bah	None	(raja) Mahendra Ripudaman Singh	Janata Party
Fatehabad	None	Mahesh Upadhyaya	Indian National Congress
Tundla	SC	Gulab Sehra	Indian National Congress
Etmadpur	SC	Maharaj Singh	Indian National Congress
Dayalbagh	None	Vijai Singh Rana	Janata Party
Agra Cantonment	None	Krishna Vir Singh Kaushal	Indian National Congress
Agra East	None	Om Prakash Jindal	Indian National Congress
Agra West	SC	Azad Kumar Kardam	Indian National Congress
Kheragarh	None	Mandleshwar Singh	Indian National Congress
Fatehpur Sikri	None	Badan Singh	Janata Party
Goverdhan	SC	Kanhaiya Lal	Janata Party
Mathura	None	Dayal Krishan	Indian National Congress
Chhata	None	Chandan Singh	Janata Party
Mat	None	Lok Mani	Indian National Congress
Gokul	None	Sardar Singh	Janata Party
Sadabad	None	Javed Ali	Indian National Congress
Hathras	None	Suraj Bhan	Janata Party
Sasni	SC	Dr. Dharm Pal	Indian National Congress
Sikandara Rao	None	Pushpa Chauhan	Indian National Congress
Gangiri	None	Babu Singh	Janata Party
Atrauli	None	Anwar Khan	Indian National Congress
Aligarh	None	Khwaza Haleem	Janata Party
Koil	SC	Pooran Chand	Indian National Congress
Iglas	None	Rajendra Singh	Janata Party
Barauli	None	Surendra Singh	Indian National Congress
Khair	None	Shivrajj Singh	Indian National Congress
Jewar	SC	Hari Singh	Indian National Congress
Khurja	None	Bhupal Singh	Indian National Congress
Debai	None	Swami Nempal	Indian National Congress
Anupshahr	None	Previn Kumar	Indian National Congress
Siana	None	Chhattar Singh	Janata Party
Agota	None	Kiran Pal Singh	Janata Party
Bulandshahr	None	Sayeedul Hasan	Indian National Congress
Shikarpur	SC	Dharam Singh	Indian National Congress
Sikandrabad	None	Yash Pal Singh	Indian National Congress
Dadri	None	Vijay Pal	Indian National Congress
Ghaziabad	None	Surendre Kumar Urf Munni	Indian National Congress
Muradnagar	None	Ishwar Dayal Tyagi	Indian National Congress
Modinagar	None	Sukhvir Singh Gahlot	Indian National Congress
Hapur	SC	Bhoop Singh Kain	Indian National Congress
Garhmukteshwar	None	Kr. Virendra Singh Dhana	Indian National Congress
Kithore	None	Bhim Singh	Indian National Congress
Hastinapur	SC	Jhaggar Singh	Indian National Congress
Sardhana	None	Syed Zakiuddin	Indian National Congress
Meerut Cantonment	None	Ajit Singh Sethi	Indian National Congress
Meerut	None	Manzoor Ahamad	Indian National Congress
Kharkhauda	None	Damodar Sharma	Indian National Congress
Siwalkhas	SC	Hem Chand Nimesh	Indian National Congress
Khekra	None	Chandra Singh	Indian National Congress
Baghpat	None	Mahesh Chand	Indian National Congress
Barnawa	None	Dharamivir Singh	Janata Party
Chhaprauli	None	Narendra Singh	Janata Party
Kandhla	None	Virendra Singh	Janata Party
Khatauli	None	Dharam Vir Singh	Indian National Congress
Jansath	SC	Deepak	Indian National Congress
Morna	None	Mahendi Asgar	Janata Party
Muzaffarnagar	None	Vidya Bhushan	Indian National Congress
Charthawal	SC	Ram Prasad	Indian National Congress
Baghra	None	Nakli Singh	Indian National Congress
Kairana	None	Hukam Singh	Janata Party
Thana Bhawan	None	Somansh Prakash	Indian National Congress
Nakur	None	Yeshpal Singh	Indian National Congress
Sarsawa	None	Rulha Singh	Janata Party
Nagal	SC	Ram Swaroop	Janata Party
Deoband	None	Mahabir Singh	Indian National Congress
Harora	SC	Bimla Rakesh	Janata Party
Saharanpur	None	Surendra Kapil	Indian National Congress
Muzaffarabad	None	Amar Singh	Independent
Roorkee	None	Ram Singh	Indian National Congress
Lhaksar	None	Qazi Mohiuddin	Janata Party
Haridwar	None	Ram Yas Singh	Indian National Congress
Mussoorie	None	Braham Datt	Indian National Congress
Dehra Dun	None	Dwarika Nath Dhawan	Indian National Congress
Chakrata	ST	Gulab Singh	Indian National Congress
