= Ranjeeta (disambiguation) =

Ranjeeta or Ranjeeta Kaur (born 1956) is an Indian actress.

Ranjeeta, Ranjita or Ranjitha is also an Indian feminine given name. Notable people with the name include:

- Ranjita or Ronjita, a Bangladeshi film actress and producer
- Ranjitha (born 1975), Indian actress in South Indian cinema and Prime Minister of Kailaasa (a claimed micronation)
- Ranjeeta Koli (born 1979), an Indian politician from Rajasthan
- Ranjitha Menon, Indian actress in Malayalam cinema
- Ranjita Rane (1977–2021), Indian cricketer
- Ranjeeta Shrestha (born 1983), a Nepalese politician

== See also ==
- Ranjit, an Indian male given name
  - Ranjeet (given name), alternative form of the male given name
  - Ranjith, another alternative form of the male given name
