= Rajendra Singh (politician) =

Indian politician

Rajendra Singh (died 2009) was an Indian politician from Uttarakhand and three term Member of the Uttar Pradesh Legislative Assembly (1991 - 2000) and Interim Uttaranchal Assembly (2000 - 2002) from Mussoorie assembly constituency. He was a member of the Bharatiya Janata Party. He served as Deputy Minister in Kalyan Singh Cabinet.

== Elections contested ==
Year	Election Type	Constituency	Result	Vote percentage	Opposition Candidate	Opposition Party	Opposition vote percentage
1991	MLA	Mussoorie	Won	37.24%	Kishori Lal Saklani	INC	27.06%
1993	MLA	Mussoorie	Won	37.89%	Brahm Dutt	INC	34.06%
1996	MLA	Mussoorie	Won	49.38%	Nav Prabhat	AIIC(T)	23.80%
