= Munna Singh Chauhan =

Indian politician from Uttarakhand

- मुन्ना सिंह चौहान
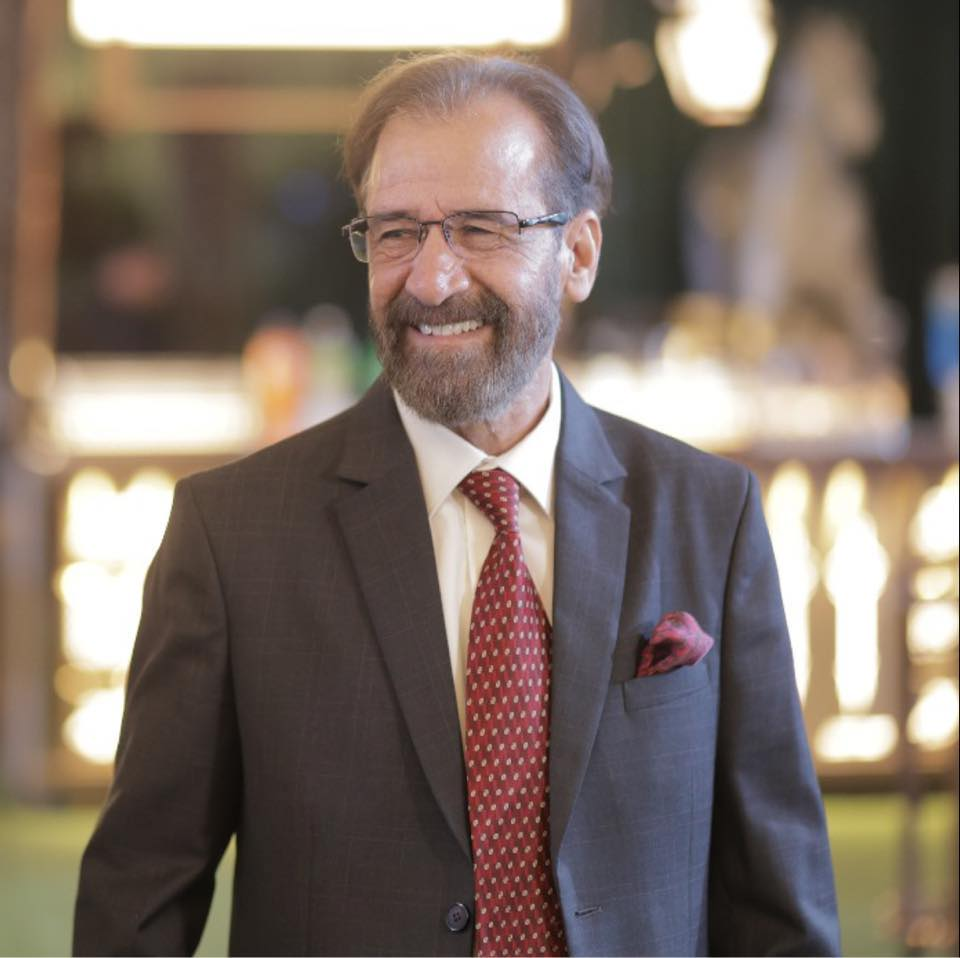

Member of Legislative Assembly
- Incumbent
- Assumed office 11 March 2017
- Preceded by: Nav Prabhat
- Constituency: Vikasnagar
- In office 21 February 2007 – 30 January 2012
- Preceded by: Nav Prabhat
- Succeeded by: Kuldeep Kumar
- Constituency: Vikasnagar
- In office 7 October 1996 – 14 February 2002
- Preceded by: Pritam Singh
- Succeeded by: Pritam Singh
- Constituency: Chakrata
- In office 1991 – 4 December 1993
- Preceded by: Gulab Singh
- Succeeded by: Pritam Singh
- Constituency: Chakrata

Personal details
- Born: 10 July 1960 (age 66) Dehradun, Uttarakhand, India (now in Uttarakhand, India)
- Party: Bharatiya Janata Party
- Other political affiliations: Janata Dal, Samajwadi Party
- Education: Postgraduate (Physics)
- Website: MunnaSinghChauhan.in

Munna Singh Chauhan is an Indian politician from Uttrakhand, prior to which he worked as physicist. He has represented Chakrata and Vikasnagar, in Uttar Pradesh and Uttarakhand Legislative Assembly being five times as Member of Assembly. He is currently serving as Member of Legislative Assembly for Vikasnagar, from Bharatiya Janata Party.

== Career ==
He started his career in 1982 as a physicist in Defence Research and Development Organisation and worked there for four years after which in 1986, he was selected by the Union Public Service Commission for the position of Senior Scientific Officer, which he refused. Afterward in 1987, he was awarded National Overseas Scholarship for higher studies in abroad by Government of India.

He refused the scholarship and resigned from position to start his political career and in 1988, he became Block Chairman of Dehradun, Uttar Pradesh (now in Uttarakhand) as first non-Congress politician. In 1991 elections, he was elected from Chakrata from Janta Dal defeating 8 times member, Gulab Singh and in 1996 from Samajwadi Party by defeating veteran Congress leader, Pritam Singh.

He has been Member of Assembly from Vikasnagar in 2007, 2017 and 2022, currently representing the constituency.

== Electoral performance ==
Election	Constituency	Party	Result	Opposition leader	Opposition Party
Uttarakhand Legislative Assembly
2022	Vikasnagar	Bharatiya Janata Party	Won	Nav Prabhat	Indian National Congress
2017	Vikasnagar	Bharatiya Janata Party	Won	Nav Prabhat	Indian National Congress
2012	Chakrata	Bharatiya Janata Party	Lost	Pritam Singh	Indian National Congress
2007	Vikasnagar	Uttarakhand Janwadi Party	Won	Nav Prabhat	Indian National Congress
2002	Chakrata	Uttarakhand Janwadi Party	Lost	Pritam Singh	Indian National Congress
Uttar Pradesh Legislative Assembly
1996	Chakrata	Samajwadi Party	Won	Pritam Singh	Indian National Congress
1993	Chakrata	Janata Dal	Lost	Pritam Singh	Indian National Congress
1991	Chakrata	Janata Dal	Won	Pritam Singh	Indian National Congress
