= Devprayag Assembly constituency =

Constituency of the Uttarakhand legislative assembly in India

Coordinates: 30.146°N 78.600°E

Devprayag
- Constituency No. 10 for the Uttarakhand Legislative Assembly

Constituency details
- Country: India
- Region: North India
- State: Uttarakhand
- District: Tehri Garhwal
- Lok Sabha constituency: Garhwal
- Established: 2002
- Reservation: None

Member of Legislative Assembly
- 5th Uttarakhand Legislative Assembly
- Incumbent Vinod Kandari
- Party: BJP
- Elected year: 2022

Devprayag Legislative Assembly constituency is one of the 70 assembly constituencies of Uttarakhand a northern state of India. Devprayag is part of Garhwal Lok Sabha constituency.

== Members of Legislative Assembly ==
Election	Name	Party
1952	Satya Singh	Independent politician
1957	Vinay Lakshmi	Indian National Congress
1962	Vinay Lakshmi	Indian National Congress
1967	Indramani Badoni	Independent politician
1969	Indramani Badoni	Indian National Congress
1974	Govind Prasad Gairola	Indian National Congress
1977	Indramani Badoni	Independent politician
1980	Vidyasagar Nautiyal	Communist Party of India
1985	Shoorveer Singh Sajwan	Indian National Congress
1989	Mantri Prasad Naithani	Janata Dal
1991	Matbar Singh Kandari	Bharatiya Janata Party
1993	Matbar Singh Kandari	Bharatiya Janata Party
1996	Matbar Singh Kandari	Bharatiya Janata Party
Major boundary changes
2002	Mantri Prasad Naithani	Indian National Congress
2007	Diwakar Bhatt	Uttarakhand Kranti Dal
2012	Mantri Prasad Naithani	Independent politician
2017	Vinod Kandari	Bharatiya Janata Party
2022	Vinod Kandari	Bharatiya Janata Party

== Election results ==
=== 2027 Assembly election ===
2027 Uttarakhand Legislative Assembly election: Devprayag
Party	Candidate	Votes	%	±%
INC				
BJP				
NOTA	None of the above			
Majority				
Turnout				
gain from		Swing		

=== Assembly Election 2022 ===
2022 Uttarakhand Legislative Assembly election: Devprayag
Party	Candidate	Votes	%	±%
BJP	Vinod Kandari	17,330	36.11%	▲4.51
UKD	Diwakar Bhatt	14,742	30.72%	New
INC	Mantri Prasad Naithani	13,585	28.31%	▲8.33
AAP	Uttam Singh	1,092	2.28%	New
BMP	Bijendra Lal	759	1.58%	New
NOTA	Nota	487	1.01%	▲0.34
Margin of victory		2,588	5.39%	▼2.60
Turnout		47,995	54.71%	▲1.42
Registered electors		87,719		▲6.84
BJP hold		Swing	▲4.51	

=== Assembly Election 2017 ===
2017 Uttarakhand Legislative Assembly election: Devprayag
Party	Candidate	Votes	%	±%
BJP	Vinod Kandari	13,824	31.59%	▲4.90
Independent	Diwakar Bhatt	10,325	23.60%	New
INC	Mantri Prasad Naithani	8,742	19.98%	▲4.19
Independent	Shoorveer Singh Sajwan	6,681	15.27%	New
Prajamandal Party	Sameer Raturi	728	1.66%	New
Uttarakhand Kranti Dal (Democratic)	Ganesh Bhatt	702	1.60%	New
Independent	Sundar Singh Rana	547	1.25%	New
Sainik Samaj Party	Sitaram Ranakoti	454	1.04%	New
Indian Business Party	Anil Bahuguna	319	0.73%	New
Independent	Deena Devi	309	0.71%	New
NOTA	None of the Above	294	0.67%	New
Margin of victory		3,499	8.00%	▲4.17
Turnout		43,756	53.29%	▼3.35
Registered electors		82,105		▲15.47
BJP gain from Independent		Swing	▲1.07	

=== Assembly Election 2012 ===
2012 Uttarakhand Legislative Assembly election: Devprayag
Party	Candidate	Votes	%	±%
Independent	Mantri Prasad Naithani	12,294	30.52%	New
BJP	Diwakar Bhatt	10,753	26.70%	▲10.85
Independent	Mahipal Singh	6,706	16.65%	New
INC	Shoorveer Singh Sajwan	6,358	15.79%	▼7.04
BSP	Jai Krishan (Pummy) Jansewak	1,001	2.49%	▼0.45
Independent	Puran Singh Bhandari	611	1.52%	New
Independent	Ved Prakash	456	1.13%	New
Shivsena	Raghunandan Pandey	423	1.05%	New
URM	Jabar Singh Urf Krantikari Pawel	418	1.04%	New
RLD	Bilashwar Jhaldiyal	411	1.02%	New
NCP	Mukesh Chamoli	370	0.92%	New
Margin of victory		1,541	3.83%	▼24.38
Turnout		40,276	56.64%	▼3.42
Registered electors		71,105		▲3.87
Independent gain from UKD		Swing	▼20.50	

=== Assembly Election 2007 ===
2007 Uttarakhand Legislative Assembly election: Devprayag
Party	Candidate	Votes	%	±%
UKD	Diwakar Bhatt	20,980	51.03%	▲34.96
INC	Mantri Prasad Naithani	9,385	22.83%	▼7.33
BJP	Magan Singh	6,515	15.85%	▼7.46
Independent	Vinod	1,356	3.30%	New
BSP	Deep Chand Tamta	1,205	2.93%	▼1.16
Independent	Chandra Bhanu Panwar	741	1.80%	New
JD(S)	Bileshwar	541	1.32%	New
Independent	Karan Singh	391	0.95%	New
Margin of victory		11,595	28.20%	▲21.35
Turnout		41,114	60.28%	▲14.46
Registered electors		68,455		▼5.03
UKD gain from INC		Swing	▲20.87	

=== Assembly Election 2002 ===
2002 Uttaranchal Legislative Assembly election: Devprayag
Party	Candidate	Votes	%	±%
INC	Mantri Prasad Naithani	9,912	30.16%	New
BJP	Raghuveer Singh Panwar	7,660	23.31%	New
UKD	Diwakar Bhatt	5,282	16.07%	New
Independent	Kalyan Singh	2,858	8.70%	New
BSP	Deveshwar Prasad Phondini	1,343	4.09%	New
CPI	Devi Prasad	1,227	3.73%	New
NCP	Manwar Singh	992	3.02%	New
Independent	Rebat Singh	982	2.99%	New
SP	Vinod Prasad	808	2.46%	New
Uttarakhand Janwadi Party	Shoorveer Singh Panwar	652	1.98%	New
Independent	Prakash Singh	579	1.76%	New
Margin of victory		2,252	6.85%	
Turnout		32,865	45.65%	
Registered electors		72,077		
INC win (new seat)				

== See also ==
- Garhwal (Lok Sabha constituency)
