= Maviya Ali =

Indian politician

MLA, 16th Legislative Assembly
- In office Feb 2016 – Mar 2017
- Preceded by: Rajendra Singh Rana
- Succeeded by: Brijesh Singh
- Constituency: Deoband

Personal details
- Born: 20 January 1973 (age 53) Saharanpur district, India
- Party: Samajwadi Party
- Other political affiliations: Indian National Congress
- Spouse: Zahir Fatima
- Children: 2
- Education: Islamia Inter College
- Profession: Politician

Maviya Ali is an Indian politician and was a member of the 16th Legislative Assembly in India. He represented the Deoband constituency of Uttar Pradesh and is a member of the Samajwadi Party political party.

== Early life and education ==
Maviya Ali was born in Deoband, Saharanpur district. He attended the Islamia Inter College and was educated up to the twelfth grade.

== Political career ==
Ali was elected to the Uttar Pradesh Legislative Assembly on 17 February 2016 in an assembly by poll as a candidate of the Indian National Congress party from the Deoband seat. The seat was vacated as the MLA Rajendra Singh Rana died due to cancer.

In the 2017 Assembly election of Uttar Pradesh, Ali as a candidate of the Samajwadi Party came third after being polled 55 thousand votes and lost to the Bharatiya Janata Party's Brijesh Singh.

== Controversies ==
In 2015, Ali courted controversy by saying that there was "no harm" if Sadhvi Rithambara (a Hindu leader of Vishwa Hindu Parishad) was assassinated. He made this statement in response to her comments on 2015 Dadri mob lynching incident.

In August 2017, the Uttar Pradesh government passed a circular asking the madrasas (Islamic religious schools) to video record their Independence Day celebration. Ali courted controversy by saying on this matter that they were Muslims first and then they were Indians.

== Posts held ==
#	From	To	Position	Comments
01	2016	Mar-2017	Member, 16th Legislative Assembly	

== See also ==
- Deoband (Assembly constituency)
- Sixteenth Legislative Assembly of Uttar Pradesh
- Uttar Pradesh Legislative Assembly
