= Vikasnagar Assembly constituency =

Constituency of the Uttarakhand legislative assembly in India

Coordinates: 30.48°N 77.77°E

Vikasnagar
- Constituency No. 16 for the Uttarakhand Legislative Assembly

Constituency details
- Country: India
- Region: North India
- State: Uttarakhand
- District: Dehradun
- Lok Sabha constituency: Tehri Garhwal
- Total electors: 107,308
- Reservation: None

Member of Legislative Assembly
- 5th Uttarakhand Legislative Assembly
- Incumbent Munna Singh Chauhan
- Party: Bharatiya Janata Party
- Elected year: 2022

Vikasnagar Assembly constituency is one of the seventy electoral Uttarakhand Legislative Assembly constituencies of the Indian state of Uttarakhand. It includes the Vikasnagar area of Dehradun District. Vikasnagar is adjacent to Himachal Pradesh district Sirmour and Paonta. VikasnagarTehri Garhwal (Lok Sabha constituency).

== Members of the Legislative Assembly ==
Election	Member	Party
2002	Nav Prabhat	Indian National Congress
2007	Munna Singh Chauhan	Bharatiya Janata Party
Major boundary changes
2009 By-election	Kuldeep Kumar	Bharatiya Janata Party
2012	Nav Prabhat	Indian National Congress
2017	Munna Singh Chauhan	Bharatiya Janata Party
2022	Munna Singh Chauhan	Bharatiya Janata Party

== Election results ==
=== 2027 Assembly election ===
2027 Uttarakhand Legislative Assembly election: Vikasnagar
Party	Candidate	Votes	%	±%
INC				
BJP				
NOTA	None of the above			
Majority				
Turnout				
gain from		Swing		

=== Assembly Election 2022 ===
2022 Uttarakhand Legislative Assembly election: Vikasnagar
Party	Candidate	Votes	%	±%
BJP	Munna Singh Chauhan	40,819	50.04%	▼0.34
INC	Nav Prabhat	35,626	43.67%	▲1.61
AAP	Praveen Bansal	1,883	2.31%	New
Independent	Gurumel Singh Rathod	1,336	1.64%	New
BSP	Deshraj	468	0.57%	▼0.20
NOTA	None of the above	388	0.48%	▼0.13
Margin of victory		5,193	6.37%	▼1.95
Turnout		81,580	75.46%	▲4.76
Registered electors		1,08,113		▼1.00
BJP hold		Swing	▼0.34	

=== Assembly Election 2017 ===
2017 Uttarakhand Legislative Assembly election: Vikasnagar
Party	Candidate	Votes	%	±%
BJP	Munna Singh Chauhan	38,895	50.37%	▲16.62
INC	Nav Prabhat	32,477	42.06%	▼6.23
Independent	Vipul Jain	2,412	3.12%	New
BSP	Gireesh Kumar	594	0.77%	▼3.47
Independent	Sandeep Dubey	499	0.65%	New
NOTA	None of the above	466	0.60%	New
UKD	Digambar Singh	392	0.51%	New
Margin of victory		6,418	8.31%	▼6.22
Turnout		77,211	70.70%	▼1.80
Registered electors		1,09,208		▲16.77
BJP gain from INC		Swing	▲2.09	

=== Assembly Election 2012 ===
2012 Uttarakhand Legislative Assembly election: Vikasnagar
Party	Candidate	Votes	%	±%
INC	Nav Prabhat	32,742	48.29%	▲12.06
BJP	Kuldeep Kumar	22,885	33.75%	▼3.37
BSP	Gurumel Singh	2,877	4.24%	New
Uttarakhand Janwadi Party	Surat Singh	2,695	3.97%	New
Independent	Suhail Pasha	1,447	2.13%	New
Independent	Babita Pundir	829	1.22%	New
Independent	Vinay Raj Singh (Pappu Bhai)	532	0.78%	New
Independent	Haridass Kataria	527	0.78%	New
SP	Arvind Sharma	458	0.68%	▼0.20
Sainik Samaj Party	Gopal Singh Dogra	454	0.67%	New
Independent	Liyakat	434	0.64%	New
Margin of victory		9,857	14.54%	▲13.65
Turnout		67,806	72.50%	▲13.62
Registered electors		93,524		
INC gain from BJP		Swing	▲11.17	

=== Assembly By-election 2009 ===
2009 Uttarakhand Legislative Assembly by-election: Vikasnagar
Party	Candidate	Votes	%	±%
BJP	Kuldeep Kumar	24,934	37.12%	▼3.25
INC	Nav Prabhat	24,338	36.23%	▲2.96
Independent	Munna Singh Chauhan	14,807	22.04%	New
Independent	Haridas Kataria	702	1.05%	New
SP	Gulfam Ali	591	0.88%	▼1.37
Independent	Rao Nasim Ahmed	378	0.56%	New
	Liyakat	350	0.52%	New
Margin of victory		596	0.89%	▼6.22
Turnout		67,175	58.88%	▼4.96
Registered electors		1,14,092		
BJP hold		Swing	▼3.25	

=== Assembly Election 2007 ===
2007 Uttarakhand Legislative Assembly election: Vikasnagar
Party	Candidate	Votes	%	±%
BJP	Munna Singh Chauhan	29,297	40.37%	▲24.04
INC	Nav Prabhat	24,141	33.27%	▲16.33
BSP	Major Mohd. Kadir Hussain	7,742	10.67%	▼1.48
NCP	Raghunath Singh	4,393	6.05%	New
Independent	Vipul Jain	2,334	3.22%	New
SP	Prakash Singh	1,636	2.25%	▲0.26
Gorkha Democratic Front	Shyam Darshan Rana	586	0.81%	New
UKD	Gulfam Ali	523	0.72%	▼1.32
Independent	Ashwani Kumar	488	0.67%	New
Margin of victory		5,156	7.11%	▲7.00
Turnout		72,566	63.84%	▲3.21
Registered electors		1,13,670		▲30.08
BJP gain from INC		Swing	▲23.44	

=== Assembly Election 2002 ===
2002 Uttaranchal Legislative Assembly election: Vikasnagar
Party	Candidate	Votes	%	±%
INC	Nav Prabhat	8,971	16.93%	New
Uttarakhand Janwadi Party	Munna Singh Chauhan	8,913	16.82%	New
BJP	Sahdev Singh Pundir	8,654	16.34%	New
BSP	Wahid Hussain Zafari	6,434	12.14%	New
Independent	Ram Sharan Nautiyal	5,296	10.00%	New
Independent	Kuldeep	3,649	6.89%	New
Independent	Raghunath Singh Negi	2,040	3.85%	New
LJP	Sadhu Ram	1,635	3.09%	New
UKD	Chandan Singh	1,081	2.04%	New
SP	Dr. Antriksh Saini	1,058	2.00%	New
CPI(M)	Kamruddin	988	1.86%	New
Margin of victory		58	0.11%	
Turnout		52,978	60.64%	
Registered electors		87,386		
INC win (new seat)				

== See also ==
- Tehri Garhwal (Lok Sabha constituency)
