= Ranjit =

Ranjit can refer to:

== Given name ==
=== Actors ===
- Ranjit Chowdhry, Indian actor
- Ranjit Mallick, Indian actor

=== Athletes ===
- Ranjit Bhatia, Indian athlete
- Ranjit Fernando, Sri Lankan cricketer
- Ranjit Singh, Indian 800m runner
- Ranjit Singh, Indian volleyball player
- Ranjit Singh (born 1994), Indian cricketer
- Ranjit Singh (born 1957), Indian Olympic race walker

=== Monarchs and politicians ===
- Ranjit Debbarma, Indian politician
- Ranjit Kamble, Indian politician
- Ranjit Shekhar Mooshahary, Indian politician
- Ranjit Singh (1780–1839), founder and first maharaja of the Sikh Empire
- Ranjit Singh of Bharatpur (1745–1805), maharaja of the Bharatpur princely state
- Ranjit Singh Chautala (born 1945), Indian politician
- Ranjitsinhji (1872–1933), maharaja of the Nawanagar princely state from 1907 to 1933

=== Others ===
- Ranjit Bolt, British playwright and translator
- Ranjit Desai, Indian author
- Ranjit Hoskote, Indian poet
- Ranjit Naik, architect and social worker
- Ranj Singh (born 1979), British doctor and TV presenter
- Ranjit Singh, fictional character in How I Met Your Mother
- Ranjit Singh Boparan (born 1966), British businessman
- Ranjit Singh Dyal (1928–2012), Indian army officer and administrator

== Organisation ==
- Ranjit Studios, former film company

== See also ==
- Ranjit Singh (disambiguation)
- Ranjith (disambiguation)
- Ranjeet (disambiguation)
