= Brijesh Singh =

Indian politician

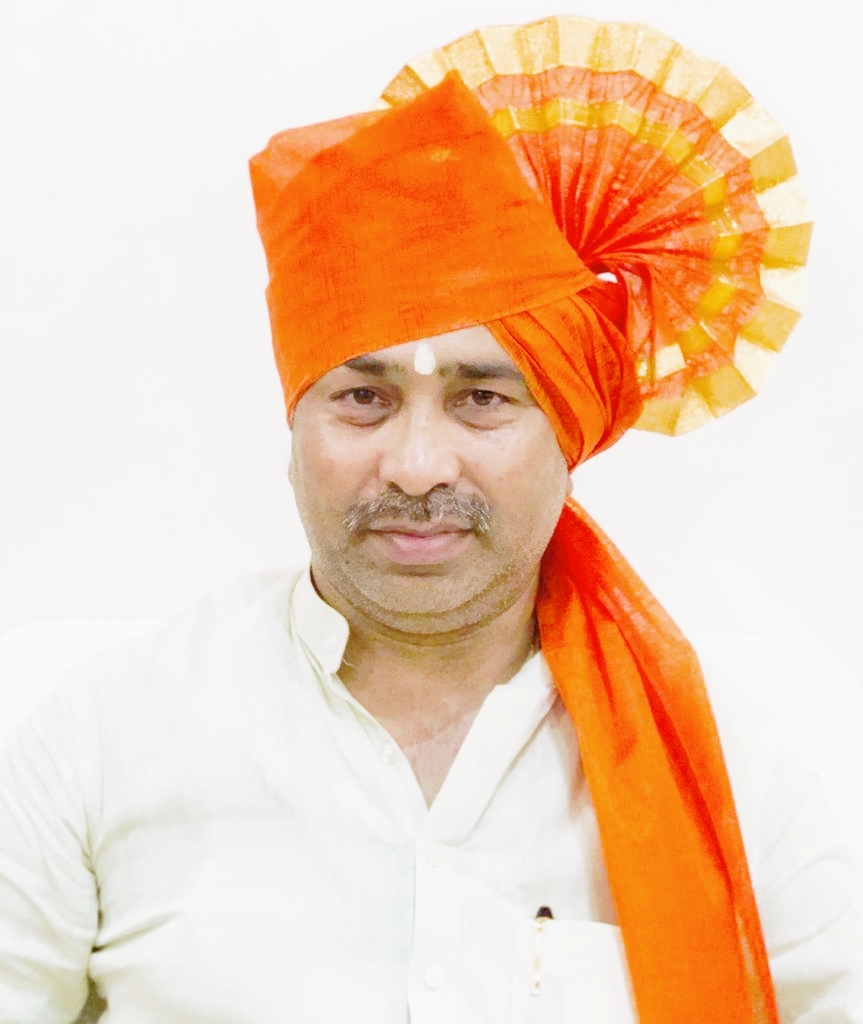

Member of Uttar Pradesh Legislative Assembly
- Incumbent
- Assumed office (2017-2022), (2022-Present)
- Preceded by: Mavia Ali
- Constituency: Deoband

Personal details
- Born: 22 February Deoband, Uttar Pradesh
- Party: Bharatiya Janata Party
- Education: Gurukul Ayurved College, Haridwar
- Occupation: MLA
- Profession: Politician

Kunwar Brijesh Singh is Minister of State, Government of Uttar pradesh for Public Works Department and Minister Incharge for Gautam Budh Nagar district. He is a member of 18th Uttar Pradesh Assembly and 17th Legislative Assembly of Uttar Pradesh. He represents the Deoband as a member of Bharatiya Janata Party.

== Political career ==
Brijesh has been a member of the 18th Uttar Pradesh Assembly and also the 17th Legislative Assembly of Uttar Pradesh. Since 2017 he is representing the Deoband constituency and is a member of the Bharatiya Janata Party.

He has been an active member of Rashtriya Swayamsevak Sangh. Brijesh started his political career as a leader of the student wing of the RSS, the Akhil Bharatiya Vidyarthi Parishad, in 1994. Later he became an activist in BJP's youth wing Bharatiya Janata Yuva Morcha (BJYM) and gradually rose in the BJYM hierarchy, holding various posts including that of District Secretary, District Vice president, Vice-Incharge, and Incharge of West Uttar Pradesh and vice-president of the State.

In 2016, Brijesh was given a strategic post in BJP and appointed Secretary for West UP considering the upcoming Legislative Elections in the state. Currently, he is a member of the State Working Committee of Uttar Pradesh BJP.

His firm acumen in political affairs in Uttar Pradesh, exceptional command over oratory skills, political management, and organizational skills make him most favored among youth and party. He was given a ticket from the controversial seat of Deoband, in Uttar Pradesh General Elections 2017 which the party hasn't won since 2002. Brijesh secured a thumping victory over the rivals from Deoband which made him a favorite among the party's top brass and Uttar Pradesh's politics. On 16 March 2017, Brijesh proposed to change the constituency name from Deoband to Devvrind.

== Posts held ==
#	From	To	Position	Comments
01	2017	2022	Member, 17th Legislative Assembly	
02	2022	Incumbent	Member, 18th Legislative Assembly	

== See also ==
- Uttar Pradesh Legislative Assembly
