= Constituency MR-2 =

Pakistani political constituency

- Constituency for the Khyber Pakhtunkhwa Assembly

Current constituency
- Member: Askar Pervaiz

Constituency MR-2 is a reserved constituency for minorities in the Khyber Pakhtunkhwa Assembly.

== See also ==
- Constituency WR-01
- Constituency WR-02
- Constituency WR-03
- Constituency WR-04
- Constituency WR-11
- Constituency WR-22
- Constituency MR-3
