= Premchand Aggarwal =

Indian politician

Minister of Finance Government of Uttarakhand
- In office 23 March 2022 – 17 March 2025
- Chief Minister: Pushkar Singh Dhami
- Preceded by: Pushkar Singh Dhami
- Succeeded by: Pushkar Singh Dhami

Minister of Urban Development & Housing Government of Uttarakhand
- In office 23 March 2022 – 17 March 2025
- Chief Minister: Pushkar Singh Dhami
- Preceded by: Banshidhar Bhagat
- Succeeded by: Pushkar Singh Dhami

Minister of Parliamentary Affairs Government of Uttarakhand
- In office 23 March 2022 – 17 March 2025
- Chief Minister: Pushkar Singh Dhami
- Preceded by: Banshidhar Bhagat
- Succeeded by: Subodh Uniyal

5th Speaker of the Uttarakhand Legislative Assembly
- In office 23 March 2017 – 10 March 2022
- Deputy: Raghunath Singh Chauhan
- Preceded by: Govind Singh Kunjwal
- Succeeded by: Ritu Khanduri Bhushan

Member of Uttarakhand Legislative Assembly
- Incumbent
- Assumed office 2007
- Preceded by: Shoorveer Singh Sajwan
- Constituency: Rishikesh

Personal details
- Born: 12 April 1960 (age 66) Doiwala, Uttar Pradesh, India (present-day Uttarakhand)
- Party: Bharatiya Janata Party
- Spouse: Shashi Prabha Aggarwal (m. 1986)
- Parent: Mange Ram Aggarwal (father)
- Education: MCom, LLB
- Website: premaggarwalbjp.in

Premchand Aggarwal (born 12 April 1960) is an Indian politician and member of the Bharatiya Janata Party. Aggarwal is a member of the Uttarakhand Legislative Assembly from the Rishikesh constituency in Dehradun district where he has a residence. He is originally from Doiwala. He has been MLA for Rishikesh consecutively in three terms since the 2007 Assembly election. In the 2017 Assembly election he defeated his nearest rival Rajpal Singh Kharola of Indian National Congress by the margin of 14,801 votes. From March 2017 till 10 March 2022 he served as Speaker of the Uttarakhand Legislative Assembly as he was elected unopposed by the newly elected members.

In 2022 Uttarakhand Assembly election, he has defeated nearest rival INC candidate Jayendra Ramola, thus creating history in Uttarakhand. He is continuous winning candidate for last 4 terms from Rishikesh assembly seat, from same party BJP.

== Controversies ==
According to Deccan Herald In February 2025, during a session of the Uttarakhand Legislative Assembly, Parliamentary Affairs Minister Premchand Aggarwal made remarks concerning 'pahadis' (people from the hills) that were perceived as derogatory. The comments led to significant uproar both within the assembly and among the public. Opposition members demanded an apology, and protests erupted across the state. Aggarwal later issued an apology, stating that his words were misconstrued. Thereafter, he resigned as a cabinet minister from Uttarakhand government.

== Electoral performance ==
Election	Constituency	Party	Result	Votes %	Opposition Candidate	Opposition Party	Opposition vote %	Ref
2022	Rishikesh	BJP	Won	43.04%	Jayendra Chand Ramola	INC	31.86%	
2017	Rishikesh	BJP	Won	45.78%	Rajpal Singh Kharola	INC	30.75%	
2012	Rishikesh	BJP	Won	35.84%	Rajpal Singh Kharola	INC	26.88%	
2007	Rishikesh	BJP	Won	35.42%	Shoorveer Singh Sajwan	INC	24.87%	
