= Deoband Assembly constituency =

Constituency of the Uttar Pradesh legislative assembly in India

Deoband
- Constituency No. 5 for the Uttar Pradesh Legislative Assembly

Constituency details
- Country: India
- Region: North India
- State: Uttar Pradesh
- District: Saharanpur
- Total electors: 3,48,944
- Reservation: None

Member of Legislative Assembly
- 18th Uttar Pradesh Legislative Assembly
- Incumbent Brijesh Singh
- Party: Bhartiya Janta Party
- Elected year: 2017

Deoband Assembly constituency is one of the 403 constituencies of the Uttar Pradesh Legislative Assembly, India. It is a part of the Saharanpur district and one of five assembly constituencies in the Saharanpur Lok Sabha constituency. Since 2008, this assembly constituency is numbered 5 amongst 403 constituencies. Prior to 2008, when the "Delimitation of Parliamentary and Assembly Constituencies Order, 2008" came into effect, this constituency was number 400.

On 16 March 2017, newly elected MLA Brijesh Singh announced he intended to rename the constituency Dev-vrand.

== Wards / Areas ==
The Deoband assembly constituency comprises the following Wards / areas.

#	Name	Reserved for	Comments
01	Deoband	None	
02	Bhaila	None	
03	Talheri Bujurg	None	
04	Deoband NPP	None	
05	Deoband Tehsil	None	

== Members of the Legislative Assembly ==
Year	Name	Party
1952	Thakur Phool Singh	Indian National Congress
1957	Thakur Yashpal Singh	Independent
1962	Thakur Phool Singh	Indian National Congress
1967	Hardev Singh Chaudhary	Indian National Congress
1969	Mahabir Singh Rana	Indian National Congress
1974	Mahabir Singh Rana	Indian National Congress
1977	Mohammad Usman	Janata Party
1980	Mahabir Singh Rana	Indian National Congress (I)
1985	Mahabir Singh Rana	Indian National Congress
1989	Mahabir Singh Rana	Indian National Congress
1991	Virender Singh	Janata Dal
1993	Shasi Bala Pundir	Bharatiya Janata Party
1996	Sukhbeer Singh Pundir	Bharatiya Janata Party
2002	Rajendra Singh Rana	Bahujan Samaj Party
2007	Manoj Chaudhary	Bahujan Samaj Party
2012	Rajendra Singh Rana	Samajwadi Party
2016^	Maviya Ali	Indian National Congress
2017	Brijesh Singh	Bharatiya Janta Party
2022	Brijesh Singh	Bharatiya Janta Party

== Election results ==
=== 2027 ===
2027 Uttar Pradesh Legislative Assembly election: Deoband
Party	Candidate	Votes	%	±%
NDA				
INDIA				
BSP				
AIMIM				
Majority				
Turnout				
gain from		Swing		

=== 2022 ===
2022 Uttar Pradesh Legislative Assembly election: Deoband
Party	Candidate	Votes	%	±%
BJP	Brijesh Singh	93,890	38.77	▼4.87
SP	Kartikey Rana	86,786	35.83	▲12.19
BSP	Choudhary Rajendra Singh	52,732	21.77	▼9.32
AIMIM	Maulana Umair Madani	3,501	1.45	
NOTA	None of the above	729	0.3	▼0.04
Majority		7,104	2.94	▼9.61
Turnout		242,193	69.41	▼2.12
BJP hold		Swing		

=== 2017 ===
17th Vidhan Sabha: 2017 Assembly Elections.

2017 Assembly Elections: Deoband
Party	Candidate	Votes	%	±%
BJP	Brijesh Singh	102,244	43.64	
BSP	Majid Ali	72,844	31.09	
SP	Maviya Ali	55,385	23.64	
NOTA	None of the above	798	0.34	
Majority		29,400	12.55	
Turnout		234,306	71.53	
BJP gain from INC		Swing	+16.74	

=== 2012 ===
By-Election, 2016: Deoband
Party	Candidate	Votes	%	±%
INC	Maviya Ali	51,012	30.14	+7.94
SP	Meena Singh	47,453	28.04	−6.06
BJP	Rampal Singh Pundir	45,513	26.89	+21.86
Independent	Vinod Kumar Tejyan	16,802	9.92	−
	Remaining 8 candidates	7.610	4.49	−0.29
NOTA	NOTA	826	0.48	
Majority		3,559	2.10	
Turnout		169,216	52.65	−14.35
INC gain from SP		Swing	+7.94	

2012 General Elections: Deoband
Party	Candidate	Votes	%	±%
SP	Rajendra Singh Rana	66,682	34.1	+12.58
BSP	Manoj Chaudhary	63,632	32.5	−3.98
INC	Anil Kumar Tanwar	45,495	22.2	+21.08
BJP	Rajpal Singh	9,857	5.03	−19.56
	Remainder 15 candidates	10,152	5.18	–2.58
Majority		3,050	1.56	
Turnout		195,818	67.0	+9.50
SP gain from BSP		Swing	+12.58	

=== 2007 ===
2007 General Elections: Deoband
Party	Candidate	Votes	%	±%
BSP	Manoj Chaudhary	53,577	36.48	
BJP	Shashi Bala Pundir	36,116	24.59	
SP	Rajendra Singh Rana	31,611	21.52	
RLD	Zain Ahmed	14,125	9.62	
	Remainder 9 candidates	11,400	7.76	
Majority		17,461	11.89	
Turnout		146,829	57.50	
BSP hold		Swing	–	

== See also ==
- Deoband
- Government of Uttar Pradesh
- List of Vidhan Sabha constituencies of Uttar Pradesh
- Uttar Pradesh
- Uttar Pradesh Legislative Assembly
