= Fredrick Azeem =

Pakistani politician

MPA Fredrick Azeem

Member of the Khyber Pakhtunkhwa Assembly
- In office May 2013 – 2018
- Constituency: MR-3

Personal details
- Party: Pakistan Muslim League (N)
- Occupation: Politician

Fredrick Azeem is a Pakistani politician hailing from Peshawar, who is a former member of the Khyber Pakhtunkhwa Assembly, belonging to the Pakistan Muslim League (N). He is also serving as member of different committees.

== Political career ==
Azeem was elected as the member of the Khyber Pakhtunkhwa Assembly on ticket of Pakistan Muslim League (N) from Constituency MR-3 in the 2013 Pakistani general election.
