= Shoorveer Singh Sajwan =

Indian politician

Member of the Uttar Pradesh Legislative Assembly
- In office 1985–1989
- Constituency: Devprayag
- In office 1993–1996
- Constituency: Tehri

Member of the Uttarakhand Legislative Assembly
- In office 2002–2007
- Constituency: Rishikesh

Personal details
- Party: Indian National Congress
- Website: shoorveersinghsajwan.in

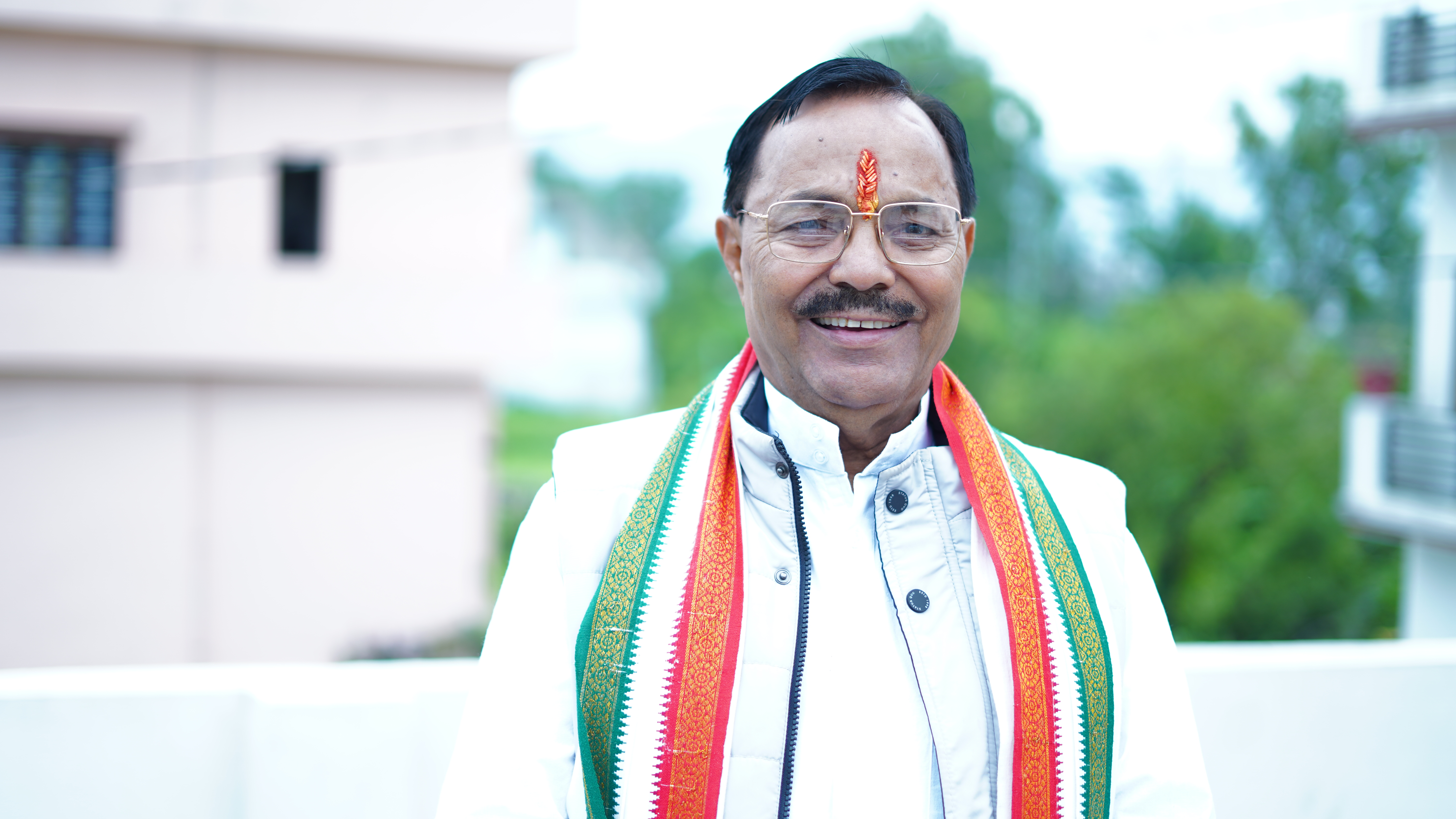
Shoorveer Singh Sajwan

Shoorveer Singh Sajwan is an Indian politician from the Indian National Congress, in the state of Uttarakhand. He won three legislative elections in 1985, 1993 and 2002. He belongs to village Panchoor which comes under Devprayag legislative Assembly. In 1985 he won his first election from Devprayag legislative assembly and after that he won his second term from Tehri legislative assembly constituency. After Uttarakhand state separated from Uttar Pradesh he won the first election from Rishikesh legislative Assembly in 2002. He is one of the senior leaders in Uttarakhand Congress. He lost in 2007 as well as in 2012. In 2017 state election he filed his nomination as independent candidate from Devprayag constituency and lost. but returned to Congress in 2019.

Sajwan, who thought of development in the political background, was born in a family of freedom fighters. His uncle and grandfather were freedom fighters. His father-in-law was the Ashok Chakra winner. At the age of 12, by staging the character of Lord Lakshman in Ramlilas, he became famous in the entire area. For many years, many characters of Ramayana were played by organizing Ramlila from place to place. In the meantime, to protect the environment at a young age, plant trees, save trees, adult education, sacrificial practices, gambling ban, middle prohibition and got full public support of the people. While being a teacher, he became a part of political and social activities by holding positions like the President of Teachers Association of Tehri district, General Secretary of Uttar Pradesh Teachers Association.

In undivided Uttar Pradesh, by making his own identity known as the mountain lion, he illuminated the name of the people of the mountain. Being close to the then Chief Minister Shri Vir Bahadur Singh ji, got employment to about 10000 educated youth in various departments. It was the result of their conscious thinking towards education that 72 (seventy two) high schools and intercolleges were established and upgraded in Tehri district. During this time 8 (eight) ITIs were created in Tehri district. He showed his thinking of development by getting approval and construction of the construction works of infinite roads.

== Early life ==
Sajwan was born on 19 December 1950 in family of Late Mor Singh Sajwan and Smt Dayawanti Devi in Village- Panchoor, Tehri-Garhwal, India in state Uttarakhand. He got the master's degree in arts (M.A.) in Political Science and also did BTC from Tehri Garhwal. After getting the education he worked as a govt. teacher in school and became Gen. Secretary of Shikshak Sangh. His wife Smt. Ambika Sajwan was ex. Chairperson of Tehri Zila Panchayat. He was very actively involved in various andolans during the Janta Dal government.

After becoming the MLA from Rishikesh Vidhan Sabha in the first election of Uttarakhand state in 2002, after becoming the minister of important departments like irrigation, minor irrigation, flood control and rehabilitation of Tehri Dam expanses, 2500 small and big roads were constructed. A network of gulls for irrigation and minor irrigation was laid in the entire state. Hundreds of irrigation tubewells were installed all over the state. He is also known as Vikas Purush in Rishikesh Vidhan Sabha. In his area Rishikesh, for the establishment of the biggest institution of the state till now, by getting 106 acres of land, after getting approval, got it constructed. Along with this, the Government Polytechnic at Khadri and a hospital in Chhidarwala were established. In Shyampur area, 9 (nine) bridges were approved and constructed. After being a candidate of Congress party in 2022, making Rishikesh district as soon as it came to power, providing employment to unemployed youth through tourism development on the lines of Marine Drive by constructing embankments for flood protection again on the banks of all river channels. To get rid of wild animals, get wired again. To establish a college in rural area. Establishment of ITI with full subjects. Establishment of a government hospital in Shyampur area and upgradation of Government Hospital of Chhidarwala. To fulfill the demand of refrigerator for restoration of health sub-centres and maintenance of generators and vaccines at all centres.

Parking, beautification, waste disposal, promotion of religious and spiritual tourism in Rishikesh city. The main objective would be to open a girls college in the area. Apart from this, according to their needs for women's development, setting up of cottage and small industries and providing 50% grant. To make use of hundreds of acres of land of IDPL, it will be a priority to get employment opportunities for the unemployed by establishing various industries.

== Electoral performance ==
Election	Constituency	Party	Result	Votes %	Opposition Candidate	Opposition Party	Opposition vote %	Ref
2007	Rishikesh	INC	Lost	24.87%	Premchand Aggarwal	BJP	35.42%	
2002	Rishikesh	INC	Won	25.28%	Sandeep Gupta	BJP	23.86%	
