= Rishikesh Assembly constituency =

Constituency of the Uttarakhand legislative assembly in India

Coordinates: 30.088°N 78.27°E

Rishikesh
- Constituency No. 24 for the Uttarakhand Legislative Assembly

Constituency details
- Country: India
- Region: North India
- State: Uttarakhand
- District: Dehradun
- Lok Sabha constituency: Haridwar
- Total electors: 167,924
- Reservation: None

Member of Legislative Assembly
- 5th Uttarakhand Legislative Assembly
- Incumbent Premchand Aggarwal
- Party: Bharatiya Janata Party
- Elected year: 2002

24-Rishikesh Legislative Assembly constituency is one of the seventy electoral Uttarakhand Legislative Assembly constituencies of Uttarakhand state in India.

Rishikesh Legislative Assembly constituency, currently is a part of Haridwar (Lok Sabha constituency) as per the delimitation in 2008. Prior to the delimitation in 2008, it was a part of Tehri Garhwal (Lok Sabha constituency). The constituency also covers 30 wards of the Rishikesh Municipal Corporation.

== Members of Legislative Assembly ==
Election	Name	Party
2002	Shoorveer Singh Sajwan	Indian National Congress
2007	Premchand Aggarwal	Bharatiya Janata Party
Major boundary changes
2012	Premchand Aggarwal	Bharatiya Janata Party
2017	Premchand Aggarwal	Bharatiya Janata Party
2022	Premchand Aggarwal	Bharatiya Janata Party

== Election results ==
=== 2027 Assembly election ===
2027 Uttarakhand Legislative Assembly election: Rishikesh
Party	Candidate	Votes	%	±%
INC				
BJP				
NOTA	None of the above			
Majority				
Turnout				
gain from		Swing		

=== Assembly Election 2022 ===
2022 Uttarakhand Legislative Assembly election: Rishikesh
Party	Candidate	Votes	%	±%
BJP	Premchand Aggarwal	52,460	50.04%	▲4.26
INC	Jayendra Chand Ramola	33,403	31.86%	▲1.12
Uttarakhand Janekta Party	Kanak Dhanai	13,080	12.48%	New
AAP	Raje Singh Negi	2,781	2.65%	New
NOTA	None of the above	819	0.78%	▼0.01
UKD	Mohan Singh Aswal	761	0.73%	New
Margin of victory		19,057	18.18%	▲3.15
Turnout		1,04,838	62.09%	▼2.71
Registered electors		1,68,852		▲11.09
BJP hold		Swing	▲4.26	

=== Assembly Election 2017 ===
2017 Uttarakhand Legislative Assembly election: Rishikesh
Party	Candidate	Votes	%	±%
BJP	Premchand Aggarwal	45,082	45.78%	▲9.93
INC	Rajpal Singh Kharola	30,281	30.75%	▲3.86
Independent	Sandeep Gupta	17,149	17.41%	New
BSP	Lallan Bhardwaj Rajbhar	2,866	2.91%	▼3.31
Independent	Vivek Tiwari	889	0.90%	New
NOTA	None of the above	775	0.79%	New
Margin of victory		14,801	15.03%	▲6.07
Turnout		98,486	64.79%	▼3.04
Registered electors		1,51,997		▲27.04
BJP hold		Swing	▲9.93	

=== Assembly Election 2012 ===
2012 Uttarakhand Legislative Assembly election: Rishikesh
Party	Candidate	Votes	%	±%
BJP	Premchand Aggarwal	29,090	35.84%	▲0.42
INC	Rajpal Kharola	21,819	26.88%	▲2.01
Independent	Deep Sharma	17,669	21.77%	New
BSP	Lallan Bharadwaj Rajbhar	5,047	6.22%	▲1.10
URM	Surandra Singh Kaintura	1,429	1.76%	New
Sainik Samaj Party	Shobha Ram Raturi	1,360	1.68%	New
UKD	Anil Kalura	1,191	1.47%	▼1.53
Independent	Sanjay Pokhriyal	624	0.77%	New
Independent	Gopal Purohit	592	0.73%	New
Independent	Yogesh Kumar Uniyal	583	0.72%	New
Margin of victory		7,271	8.96%	▼1.59
Turnout		81,166	67.84%	▲10.02
Registered electors		1,19,646		
BJP hold		Swing	▲0.42	

=== Assembly Election 2007 ===
2007 Uttarakhand Legislative Assembly election: Rishikesh
Party	Candidate	Votes	%	±%
BJP	Premchand Aggarwal	30,491	35.42%	▲11.56
INC	Shoorveer Singh Sajwan	21,414	24.87%	▼0.41
Independent	Jaideep Singh Negi	13,146	15.27%	New
Independent	Jai Singh Rawat	6,435	7.47%	New
BSP	Yogi Raj	4,410	5.12%	▲1.88
UKD	Bindu Rajput	2,583	3.00%	▲0.74
Gorkha Democratic Front	Kharak Bahadur Khatri	1,847	2.15%	New
Independent	Sanjeev Gupta	1,310	1.52%	New
Independent	Shanti Prasad	1,179	1.37%	New
SP	Vijaypal Singh Rawat	690	0.80%	▼2.02
Vishwa Vikas Sangh	Ved Prakash Sharma	490	0.57%	New
Margin of victory		9,077	10.54%	▲9.12
Turnout		86,092	57.86%	▲7.64
Registered electors		1,48,889		
BJP gain from INC		Swing	▲10.13	

=== Assembly Election 2002 ===
2002 Uttaranchal Legislative Assembly election: Rishikesh
Party	Candidate	Votes	%	±%
INC	Shoorveer Singh Sajwan	14,898	25.28%	New
BJP	Sandeep Gupta	14,057	23.86%	New
Independent	Harsh Vardhan Sharma	8,355	14.18%	New
Independent	Rajender Singh Shah	8,308	14.10%	New
BSP	Gopal Purohit	1,909	3.24%	New
LJP	Krishan	1,824	3.10%	New
CPI	Virendra Sharma	1,808	3.07%	New
SP	Sudha Rani	1,661	2.82%	New
UKD	D. N. Todaria	1,332	2.26%	New
Independent	Rajendra Singh Rakha	999	1.70%	New
SJP(R)	Shish Ram Kanswal	747	1.27%	New
Margin of victory		841	1.43%	
Turnout		58,924	50.18%	
Registered electors		1,17,420		
INC win (new seat)				

== See also ==
- Rishikesh
