= Constituency WR-03 =

Reserved seat in a Pakistani provincial assembly

- Constituency for the Khyber Pakhtunkhwa Assembly

Current constituency
- Member: Nadia Sher

Constituency WR-03 is a reserved seat for women in the Khyber Pakhtunkhwa Assembly.

== 2013 election ==
- Nadia Sher

== See also ==
- Constituency WR-01
- Constituency WR-02
- Constituency WR-04
- Constituency WR-11
- Constituency WR-22
- Constituency MR-2
- Constituency MR-3
