= Ranjeet (given name) =

Ranjeet is a masculine given name. It is primarily associated with Gopal Bedi, an Indian actor, film producer, and director.

Other notable figures with the surname include:

- Ranjeet Deshmukh (born 1946), Indian politician
- Ranjeet Kumar Dass (born 1965), Indian politician
- Ranjeet Pandre (born 1995), Indian professional footballer
- Ranjeet Ranjan (born 1974), Indian politician
- Ranjeet Singh (1934–2019), Indian politician
- Ranjeet Singh, Pakistani politician
- Ranjeet Suman (born 1976), Indian politician
- Ranjeet Singh Judeo (1942/1943–2023), Indian politician

== See also ==
- Ranjit (disambiguation)
- Ranjith (disambiguation)
