= Askar Pervaiz =

Pakistani politician

MPA Askar Pervaiz

Member of the Provincial Assembly of Khyber Pakhtunkhwa
- Incumbent
- Assumed office 31 May 2013
- Constituency: MR-2, Peshawar District

Personal details
- Party: Jamiat Ulema-e-Islam (F)
- Occupation: Politician

Askar Pervaiz is a seasoned representative of religious minorities in Pakistan, currently serving as a Member of the Provincial Assembly (MPA) on a reserved seat for minorities. He previously held this position from May 2013 to May 2018.

With extensive experience in governance, humanitarian leadership, and private sector management, Pervaiz has been a vocal advocate for the rights of religious minorities. His efforts focus on improving living standards through healthcare, education, clean water, and poverty relief initiatives, particularly targeting youth in minority communities to drive lasting change.

Pervaiz received his early education at Edwards School, Peshawar, and later earned a bachelor's degree in Computer Science from Edwards College, Peshawar. He furthered his education by completing a law degree and an MBA.

During his college days, Pervaiz began his social work activities by joining the Student Christian Movement, where he served as president of the Khyber Pakhtunkhwa chapter for two consecutive terms. He started his political career by joining Jamiat Ulema-e-Islam Pakistan and became an MPA in May 2013. Additionally, he has held management positions in various private organizations . He has also served as the committee member of Standing Committee No 22 on Revenue Department, Standing Committee No. 14 on Industries and Technical Education Department and Standing Committee No. 06 on Auqaf, Hajj, Religious and Minority Affairs Department. Pervaiz is a young Christian politician his seat type is Reserved Seats for Minority.
