= Indramani Badoni =

Indian politician (1925–1999)

Indramani Badoni "Gandhi of Uttarakhand"
- Born: December 24, 1925; Akhodi, Garhwal Kingdom
- Died: August 18, 1998 (aged 72); Rishikesh, Uttarakhand, India
- Occupations: Politician; Activist
- Political party: Uttarakhand Kranti Dal
- Movement: Uttarakhand Statehood Movement
- Spouse: Surji Devi (married 1968–)

Indramani Badoni (December 24, 1925 –August 18, 1999) also known as the "Gandhi of Uttarakhand," was an Indian educator, politician, environmentalist, folk artist and statehood activist from the present day Indian state of Uttarakhand.

== Early life and education ==
Indramani Badoni was born on December 24, 1925 in the small farming hamlet of Akhori, Hindow, in the subsidiary princely state of Tehri Garhwal. Badoni was born to Kaldi Devi and Sureshanand. He spent his early life in poverty.

Badoni received his primary education in the village Akhori, Hindow, and completed his education in Nainital and Dehradun. Badoni completed his graduate degree from DAV PG College, Dehradun in 1949. He married Surji Devi when he was 19 and went to Bombay in search of livelihood. However, he soon returned for health reasons.

Badoni was also a theatre-artist and is said to have been adept at playing folk instruments. In 1956, on the occasion of Republic Day Parade at Rajpath, Indramani Badoni organized a kedar dance under the leadership of Hindao's folk artists Shivjani Dhung and Giraj Dhung.

== Political career ==
in 1953, Mirabehn, a British-Indian supporter of the Indian Independence Movement and devoted disciple of Gandhi, went to Tehri on a humanitarian and educational visit. Upon reaching Akhodi, she sought the counsel of an educated and perceptive villager to help devise strategies for local development. Mirabehn employed the Gandhian method of village upliftment, where establishing a dialogue with knowledgeable and motivated local individuals was key to initiating sustainable development programs. Badoni responded to her call, and inspired her vision, devoted himself to social work, playing an active role in the village’s advancement.

In 1961, Indramani Badoni became a village head and afterwards the head of the development block, Jakholi. He was elected as an independent candidate to the Uttar Pradesh Legislative Assembly for the first time from Devprayag in 1967.

In 1969, he was elected as a candidate of the All India Congress, and in 1977, he was re-elected to the Uttar Pradesh Legislative Assembly as an Independent candidate. Badoni was a popular leader and managed footing during the 1977 Janata Party wave, the first time since independence that the Indian National Congress was defeated nationally. Badoni won by such a large margin that both the Congress and Janata candidates lost their deposits.

However, Badoni faced setbacks in his political career. He lost the election to Govind Prasad Gairola in 1974, and in 1989, he lost the parliamentary election to Brahm Dutt. Badoni also contested the 1989 Lok Sabha elections. Badoni lost this election by ten thousand votes. It is said that at the time of filing the nomination, Badoni had only one rupee in his pocket while his rival Brahmadutt spent lakhs of rupees on his campaign.

Badoni was deeply committed to the cause of a separate Uttarakhand state. He was active in the movement for a separate state since 1979 and served as the Vice President of the Parvateey Vikas Parishad (Hill Development Council). In 1980, Badoni joined the hands with the Uttarakhand Kranti Dal, a newly established regional political party aimed at creating a separate hill state from Uttar Pradesh, and remained its active member throughout his life. During the Chief Ministership of Banarasi Das Gupta in Uttar Pradesh, he was the Vice Chairman of the

While working in the education sector, Badoni opened many schools in Garhwal, prominent among which are the Intermediate College Kathud, Magadhar, Dhutu and Higher Secondary School Bugalidhar.

== Role in the Uttarakhand Statehood Movement ==
In 1988, Badoni did a 105-day foot march under the banner of Uttarakhand Kranti Dal. This procession ran from Tawaghat in Pithoragarh to Dehradun. He went from door to door in the village and told the people the benefits of a separate state. In 1992, he declared Gairsain the capital of Uttarakhand on the day of Makar Sankranti in Bageshwar.

In 1994, Badoni began a fast unto death in Pauri to demand a separate Uttarakhand state. On 7 August, he was forcibly taken and admitted to a hospital in Meerut and from there he was shifted to AIIMS, Delhi in an attempt to withdraw him from public view. His arrest enraged his followers and the movement gained further momentum resulting in the creation of Uttarakhand on November 9, 2000, a year after his demise.

Due to his unwavering faith in the non-violent movement and his charismatic but easy-going personality, The Washington Post referred to Badoni as the "Mountain Gandhi." He died on August 18, 1999, at the Vithal Ashram in Rishikesh. Badoni remains a respected and influential figure in the history of Uttarakhand.

== Legacy ==
In state and national media Badoni is largely referred to as the "unsung hero" of the Uttarakhand Statehood Movement.
