= Chakrata Assembly constituency =

Constituency of the Uttarakhand legislative assembly in India

Coordinates: 30.70°N 77.87°E

Chakrata
- Constituency No. 15 for the Uttarakhand Legislative Assembly

Constituency details
- Country: India
- Region: North India
- State: Uttarakhand
- District: Dehradun
- Lok Sabha constituency: Tehri Garhwal
- Total electors: 105,064
- Reservation: ST

Member of Legislative Assembly
- 5th Uttarakhand Legislative Assembly
- Incumbent Pritam Singh
- Party: Indian National Congress
- Elected year: 2022

Chakrata is one of the seventy electoral Uttarakhand Legislative Assembly constituencies of Uttarakhand state in India. It includes Chakrata area of Dehradun District. This seat was known as Chakrata Constituency before the 2002 delimitation.

Chakrata Legislative Assembly constituency is a part of Tehri Garhwal (Lok Sabha constituency).

== Members of the Legislative Assembly ==
Election	Name	Party
1974	Gulab Singh	Indian National Congress
1977	Shoorveer Singh	Janata Party
1980	Gulab Singh	Indian National Congress
1985	Gulab Singh	Indian National Congress
1989	Gulab Singh	Indian National Congress
1991	Munna Singh Chauhan	Janata Dal
1993	Pritam Singh	Indian National Congress
1996	Munna Singh Chauhan	Samajwadi Party
Major boundary changes
2002	Pritam Singh	Indian National Congress
2007	Pritam Singh	Indian National Congress
2012	Pritam Singh	Indian National Congress
2017	Pritam Singh	Indian National Congress
2022	Pritam Singh	Indian National Congress

== Election results ==
=== 2027 Assembly election ===
2027 Uttarakhand Legislative Assembly election: Chakrata
Party	Candidate	Votes	%	±%
INC				
BJP				
NOTA	None of the above			
Majority				
Turnout				
gain from		Swing		

=== Assembly Election 2022 ===
2022 Uttarakhand Legislative Assembly election: Chakrata
Party	Candidate	Votes	%	±%
INC	Pritam Singh	36,853	50.64%	▲2.33
BJP	Ram Sharan Nautiyal	27,417	37.67%	▼8.50
Independent	Kamlesh Bhatt	3,624	4.98%	New
NOTA	Nota	1,380	1.90%	▲1.36
Independent	Gajendra Dutt	963	1.32%	New
Independent	Daulat Kunvar	946	1.30%	New
AAP	Darshan Dobhal	485	0.67%	New
BSP	Bheem Dutt	388	0.53%	▼2.75
Independent	Kuldeep Singh Chauhan	364	0.50%	New
Margin of victory		9,436	12.97%	▲10.83
Turnout		72,774	68.57%	▼4.13
Registered electors		1,06,126		▲6.59
INC hold		Swing	▲2.33	

=== Assembly Election 2017 ===
2017 Uttarakhand Legislative Assembly election: Chakrata
Party	Candidate	Votes	%	±%
INC	Pritam Singh	34,968	48.31%	▼2.23
BJP	Madhu Chauhan	33,425	46.18%	▲43.22
BSP	Daulat Kunwar	2,375	3.28%	▲1.73
Independent	Swaraj Singh	723	1.00%	New
NOTA	None of the Above	391	0.54%	New
Margin of victory		1,543	2.13%	▼8.00
Turnout		72,386	72.70%	▼2.89
Registered electors		99,563		▲14.60
INC hold		Swing	▼2.23	

=== Assembly Election 2012 ===
2012 Uttarakhand Legislative Assembly election: Chakrata
Party	Candidate	Votes	%	±%
INC	Pritam Singh	33,187	50.53%	▲0.98
Uttarakhand Janwadi Party	Munna Singh Chauhan	26,533	40.40%	New
BJP	Kamla Chauhan	1,943	2.96%	▼3.43
BSP	Ghansyam Kunwar	1,017	1.55%	▼1.20
SP	Naresh Chauhan	768	1.17%	New
Independent	Bheem Dutt	610	0.93%	New
NCP	Shamsher Singh Rathour	538	0.82%	New
Margin of victory		6,654	10.13%	▲1.90
Turnout		65,673	75.59%	▲8.34
Registered electors		86,876		▲28.64
INC hold		Swing	▲0.98	

=== Assembly Election 2007 ===
2007 Uttarakhand Legislative Assembly election: Chakrata
Party	Candidate	Votes	%	±%
INC	Pritam Singh	22,504	49.55%	▼0.04
Independent	Madhu Chauhan	18,763	41.31%	New
BJP	Pratap Singh	2,902	6.39%	▼8.52
BSP	Bhim Dutt	1,248	2.75%	New
Margin of victory		3,741	8.24%	▼13.72
Turnout		45,417	67.26%	▼0.25
Registered electors		67,535		▲22.41
INC hold		Swing	▼0.04	

=== Assembly Election 2002 ===
2002 Uttaranchal Legislative Assembly election: Chakrata
Party	Candidate	Votes	%	±%
INC	Pritam Singh	18,468	49.59%	New
Uttarakhand Janwadi Party	Munna Singh Chauhan	10,292	27.64%	New
BJP	Murat Ram	5,554	14.91%	New
SP	Nain Singh Rawat	2,051	5.51%	New
Independent	Munna Singh Rana	877	2.35%	New
Margin of victory		8,176	21.95%	
Turnout		37,242	67.50%	
Registered electors		55,172		
INC win (new seat)				

== See also ==
- Tehri Garhwal (Lok Sabha constituency)
