= Mussoorie Assembly constituency =

Constituency of the Uttarakhand legislative assembly in India

Coordinates: 30.46°N 78.08°E

Mussoorie
- Constituency No. 22 for the Uttarakhand Legislative Assembly

Constituency details
- Country: India
- Region: North India
- State: Uttarakhand
- District: Dehradun
- Lok Sabha constituency: Tehri Garhwal
- Total electors: 131,816
- Reservation: None

Member of Legislative Assembly
- 5th Uttarakhand Legislative Assembly
- Incumbent Ganesh Joshi
- Party: Bharatiya Janata Party
- Elected year: 2022

Mussoorie is one of the seventy electoral Uttarakhand Legislative Assembly constituencies of Uttarakhand state in India representing Mussoorie.

Mussoorie Legislative Assembly constituency is a part of Tehri Garhwal (Lok Sabha constituency).

== Members of the Legislative Assembly ==
Election	Name	Party
1957	Gulab Singh	Independent politician
1962	Gulab Singh	Indian National Congress
1967	Gulab Singh	Indian National Congress
1969	Gulab Singh	Indian National Congress
1974	Shanti Prapanna Sharma	Indian National Congress
1977	Ranjeet Singh	Janata Party
1980	Brahm Dutt	Indian National Congress
1985	Maufidar Kishori Lal Saklani	Indian National Congress
1989	Ranjeet Singh	Independent
1991	Rajendra Singh	Bharatiya Janata Party
1993	Rajendra Singh	Bharatiya Janata Party
1996	Rajendra Singh	Bharatiya Janata Party
Major boundary changes
2002	Jot Singh Gunsola	Indian National Congress
2007	Jot Singh Gunsola	Indian National Congress
Major boundary changes
2012	Ganesh Joshi	Bharatiya Janata Party
2017	Ganesh Joshi	Bharatiya Janata Party
2022	Ganesh Joshi	Bharatiya Janata Party

== Election results ==
=== 2027 Assembly election ===
2027 Uttarakhand Legislative Assembly election: Mussoorie
Party	Candidate	Votes	%	±%
INC				
BJP				
NOTA	None of the above			
Majority				
Turnout				
gain from		Swing		

=== Assembly Election 2022 ===
2022 Uttarakhand Legislative Assembly election: Mussoorie
Party	Candidate	Votes	%	±%
BJP	Ganesh Joshi	44,847	56.49%	▲1.95
INC	Godavari Thapli	29,522	37.19%	▼1.42
AAP	Prem Kishan	2,759	3.48%	New
NOTA	None of the above	701	0.88%	▲0.05
Independent	Manish Gauniyal	688	0.87%	New
BSP	Ashok Panwar	466	0.59%	▼0.55
Margin of victory		15,325	19.30%	▲3.36
Turnout		79,386	59.66%	▲1.60
Registered electors		1,33,066		▲1.98
BJP hold		Swing	▲1.95	

=== Assembly Election 2017 ===
2017 Uttarakhand Legislative Assembly election: Mussoorie
Party	Candidate	Votes	%	±%
BJP	Ganesh Joshi	41,322	54.55%	▲10.23
INC	Godavari Thapli	29,245	38.60%	▲9.71
Independent	Rajkumar Jaiswal	1,692	2.23%	New
BSP	Ashok Panwar	862	1.14%	▼1.79
NOTA	None of the above	634	0.84%	New
UKD	Jai Prakash Upadhyay	471	0.62%	▼0.28
Independent	Sanjay Kundaliya	404	0.53%	New
Margin of victory		12,077	15.94%	▲0.52
Turnout		75,756	58.06%	▼3.68
Registered electors		1,30,488		▲27.05
BJP hold		Swing	▲10.23	

=== Assembly Election 2012 ===
2012 Uttarakhand Legislative Assembly election: Mussoorie
Party	Candidate	Votes	%	±%
BJP	Ganesh Joshi	28,097	44.32%	▲16.18
INC	Jot Singh Gunsola	18,321	28.90%	▼2.25
Independent	Godavari Thapli	9,248	14.59%	New
Gorkha Democratic Front	Bhupendra Singh Chhetri	2,628	4.14%	▼2.05
BSP	P. T. Manoj Sharma	1,854	2.92%	▲1.35
Independent	Mohan Lal Bangwal	593	0.94%	New
UKD	Pramila Rawat	570	0.90%	▼5.76
Independent	Jagdish Chauhan	444	0.70%	New
Margin of victory		9,776	15.42%	▲12.41
Turnout		63,402	61.73%	▲5.33
Registered electors		1,02,702		
BJP gain from INC		Swing	▲13.17	

=== Assembly Election 2007 ===
2007 Uttarakhand Legislative Assembly election: Mussoorie
Party	Candidate	Votes	%	±%
INC	Jot Singh Gunsola	11,770	31.15%	▼21.15
BJP	Sahdev Singh Pundir	10,632	28.14%	▼1.10
Independent	Upendra Thapli	8,336	22.06%	New
UKD	Prakash Joshi	2,515	6.66%	▲5.96
Gorkha Democratic Front	Bhupendra Singh Chhetri	2,341	6.20%	New
BSP	Kripal Singh	593	1.57%	▼1.35
Independent	Harshbir Singh	577	1.53%	New
SP	Moolchand	270	0.71%	▼0.78
SJP(R)	Sombala Jha	262	0.69%	New
BJSH	Resham Singh Kirshali	215	0.57%	New
Margin of victory		1,138	3.01%	▼20.05
Turnout		37,787	56.46%	▲12.83
Registered electors		66,991		
INC hold		Swing	▼21.15	

=== Assembly Election 2002 ===
2002 Uttaranchal Legislative Assembly election: Mussoorie
Party	Candidate	Votes	%	±%
INC	Jot Singh Gunsola	14,384	52.30%	New
BJP	Narayan Singh Rana	8,041	29.23%	New
Independent	J. V. Karki	1,124	4.09%	New
Uttarakhand Janwadi Party	Prem Singh	837	3.04%	New
BSP	Manish Verma	804	2.92%	New
Independent	Resham Singh	558	2.03%	New
CPI	Virendra Singh	462	1.68%	New
SP	Subhash	412	1.50%	New
NCP	Yam Bahadur	194	0.71%	New
UKD	Bhagwan Singh	190	0.69%	New
LJP	Manjeet	150	0.55%	New
Margin of victory		6,343	23.06%	
Turnout		27,505	43.61%	
Registered electors		63,120		
INC win (new seat)				
