= Diwakar Bhatt =

Indian politician (1946–2025)

Diwakar Bhatt (1 August 1946 – 25 November 2025) was an Indian politician from Uttarakhand and he served as Central President of regional party Uttarakhand Kranti Dal (UKD). Bhatt was a member of the Uttarakhand Legislative Assembly from the Devprayag constituency from 2007 to 2012 and unsuccessfully contested in 2002 and 2022 from UKD, 2012 as BJP, and 2017 as IND. He was one of the founding members of UKD and played a prominent role in Uttarakhand Statehood Movement.

Bhatt died on 25 November 2025 at his residence in Haridwar due to prolonged illness at the age of 79.
