= Constituency WR-04 =

Reserved seat in a Pakistani provincial assembly

- Constituency for the Khyber Pakhtunkhwa Assembly

Current constituency
- Member: Aisha Naeem

Constituency WR-04 is a reserved seat for women in the Khyber Pakhtunkhwa Assembly.

== See also ==
- Constituency WR-01
- Constituency WR-02
- Constituency WR-03
- Constituency WR-11
- Constituency WR-22
- Constituency MR-2
- Constituency MR-3
