= Mahabir Singh Rana =

Indian politician

Mahabir Singh Rana महाबीर सिंह राणा

MLA, 10th Legislative Assembly
- In office Dec 1989 – Apr 1991
- Preceded by: Mahabir Singh Rana
- Succeeded by: Virender Singh
- Constituency: Deoband

MLA, 09th Legislative Assembly
- In office Mar 1985 – Nov 1989
- Preceded by: Mahabir Singh Rana
- Succeeded by: Mahabir Singh Rana
- Constituency: Deoband

MLA, 08th Legislative Assembly
- In office Jun 1980 – Mar 1985
- Preceded by: Mohammad Usman
- Succeeded by: Mahabir Singh Rana
- Constituency: Deoband

MLA, 06th Legislative Assembly
- In office Mar 1974 – Apr 1977
- Preceded by: Mahabir Singh Rana
- Succeeded by: Mohammad Usman
- Constituency: Deoband

MLA, 05th Legislative Assembly
- In office Feb 1969 – Mar 1974
- Preceded by: P. Singh
- Succeeded by: Mahabir Singh Rana
- Constituency: Deoband

Personal details
- Born: Saharanpur, Uttar Pradesh, India
- Citizenship: India
- Party: Indian National Congress
- Profession: Politician

Mahabir Singh Rana is an Indian politician and member of the 05th, 06th, 08th, 09th and 10th Legislative assemblies of Uttar Pradesh. Rana represented the Deoband constituency of Uttar Pradesh and is a member of the Indian National Congress political party.

== Political career ==
Mahabir Singh Rana has been a MLA for five terms (from 1969 to 1991). During all his terms, he represented the Deoband constituency. In 1977, he lost the election to Mohammad Usman. Rana has been a member of the Indian National Congress political party.

== Posts held ==
#	From	To	Position	Comments
01	1969	1974	Member, 05th Legislative Assembly	
02	1974	1977	Member, 06th Legislative Assembly	
03	1980	1985	Member, 08th Legislative Assembly	
04	1985	1989	Member, 09th Legislative Assembly	
05	1989	1991	Member, 10th Legislative Assembly	

== See also ==
- Deoband
- Uttar Pradesh Legislative Assembly
- Government of India
- Politics of India
- Indian National Congress
