= Naseem Hayat =

Pakistani politician

Member of the Provincial Assembly of Khyber Pakhtunkhwa
- In office 29 May 2013 – 28 May 2018
- Constituency: Reserved seat for women

Personal details
- Party: PTI (2013-present)

Naseem Hayat (Urdu: نسیم حیات) is a Pakistani politician who had been a Member of the Provincial Assembly of Khyber Pakhtunkhwa from May 2013 to May 2018.

== Political career ==
She was elected to the Provincial Assembly of Khyber Pakhtunkhwa as a candidate of Pakistan Tehreek-e-Insaf (PTI) on a reserved seat for women in the 2013 Pakistani general election. During her tenure as Member of the Khyber Pakhtunkhwa Assembly, she served as Chairperson of Standing Committee for Khyber Pakhtunkhwa Assembly on Population Welfare.

In June 2014, she resigned as the president of women wing of PTI chapter in Khyber Pakhtunkhwa, an office she was elected to in February 2013 in intra-party election.

In May 2016, Hayat joined a resolution to establish a Women's Caucus in the Provincial Assembly of Khyber Pakhtunkhwa.
