= Mohammad Usman (Indian politician) =

Indian politician from Uttar Pradesh

Mohammed Usman

Member of the Uttar Pradesh Legislative Assembly
- In office 1977–1980
- Constituency: Deoband

Mohammed Usman is an Indian politician and was a member of the Uttar Pradesh Legislative Assembly he represented Deoband Assembly constituency of Uttar Pradesh and is a member of the Janata Party in office June 1977 to February 1980.
