= Nav Prabhat =

Indian politician

Ex MLA Nav Prabhat

Member of Legislative Assembly for Vikasnagar
- In office 2002–2007
- In office 2012–2017

Member of Uttar Pradesh Legislative Council
- In office 1990–1996

Personal details
- Party: Indian National Congress

Nav Prabhat is an Indian politician from Uttarakhand and a two term Member of the Uttarakhand Legislative Assembly. Nav Prabhat twice (2002-07 & 2012-17) represented the Vikasnagar (Uttarakhand Assembly constituency). Nav Prabhat is a member of the Indian National Congress.

== Positions held ==
Year	Description
1990 - 1996	Elected to Uttar Pradesh Legislative Council
2002 - 2007	Elected to 1st Uttarakhand Assembly: Cabinet Minister - Environment and Forest, Urban Development, Urban employment and poverty alleviation
2012 - 2017	Elected to 2nd Uttarakhand Assembly (2nd term): Member - Public Accounts Committee (2012 – 13); Chairman - Estimates Committee (2014 – 16); Cabinet Minister - Transport, Mining, CM Office (2016–17)

== Elections contested ==
Year	Constituency	Result	Vote percentage	Opposition Candidate	Opposition Party	Opposition vote percentage	Ref
2002	Vikasnagar	Won	NA	Munna Singh Chauhan	BJP	NA	
2007	Vikasnagar	Lost	NA	Munna Singh Chauhan	BJP	NA	
2009 (Bye Elect)	Vikasnagar	Lost	NA	Kuldeep Kumar	BJP	NA	
2012	Vikasnagar	Won	NA	Kuldeep Kumar	BJP	NA	
2017	Vikasnagar	Lost	NA	Munna Singh Chauhan	BJP	NA	
2022	Vikasnagar	Lost	NA	Munna Singh Chauhan	BJP	NA	
