= Gulab Singh (Uttarakhand politician) =

Indian politician

Gulab Singh (1926–2000) was an Indian politician. He was a member of Uttar Pradesh Legislative Assembly for eight terms. He served as a minister during the congressional government.

Singh represented Chakrata and was a member of the Indian National Congress. His son Pritam Singh served as the president of the Uttarakhand Congress Party and was a four-term member of the Uttarakhand Legislative Assembly (2002-2007 and 2012–2017).

== Early life ==
Singh was born on 15 June 1926 in Virnad village in Dehradun district of United Provinces of Agra and Oudh, British India (now in Uttarakhand, India) to a Khasa Rajput family of Jaunsari community. His father, Dhan Singh Syana was Syana (chieftan) of Khat Virnad of Jaunsar-Bawar region.

He completed his schooling from local school in his village and graduated from D.A.V. College, Dehradun, afterwards he became active in student politics.

== Positions held ==
Year	Description
1957 - 1962	Elected to 2nd Uttar Pradesh Assembly from Mussoorie Assembly
1962 - 1967	Elected to 3rd Uttar Pradesh Assembly from Mussoorie Assembly (2nd term)
1967 - 1969	Elected to 4th Uttar Pradesh Assembly from Mussoorie Assembly (3rd term)
1969 - 1974	Elected to 5th Uttar Pradesh Assembly from Mussoorie Assembly (4th term): Deputy Minister, Govt of Uttar Pradesh (1970 - 1973)
1974 - 1977	Elected to 6th Uttar Pradesh Assembly from Chakrata Assembly (5th term)
1980 - 1985	Elected to 8th Uttar Pradesh Assembly from Chakrata Assembly (6th term): Minister of State, Govt of Uttar Pradesh (1980 - 1982); Minister of State, Govt of Uttar Pradesh (1983 - 1985)
1985 - 1989	Elected to 9th Uttar Pradesh Assembly from Chakrata Assembly (7th term): Minister of State for Hill Development (26 April 1985 - 24 Sept 1985)
1989 - 1991	Elected to 10th Uttar Pradesh Assembly from Chakrata Assembly (8th term)

== Elections ==
Year	Constituency	Result	Vote percentage	Opposition Candidate	Opposition Party	Opposition vote percentage	Ref
1951	Chakrata Cum Western Doon	Lost	35.14%	Shanti Parpan Sharma	INC	43.72%	
1957	Mussoorie	Won	48.47%	Surat Singh	INC	40.34%	
1962	Mussoorie	Won	53.97%	Baru Datt	PSP	25.42%	
1967	Mussoorie	Won	43.24%	D. Datta	PSP	25.73%	
1969	Mussoorie	Won	45.45%	Brahm Datt	SSP	24.22%	
1974	Chakrata	Won	50.96%	Shoorvir Singh	IND	45.97%	
1977	Chakrata	Lost	46.95%	Shoorvir Singh	JNP	53.05%	
1980	Chakrata	Won	55.37%	Shoor Bir Singh	JNP(SC)	43.04%	
1985	Chakrata	Won	Unopposed	-	-	-	
1989	Chakrata	Won	38.24%	Shoor Bir Singh	JD	33.01%	
