= Rajendra Singh Rana =

Indian politician

Rajendra Singh Rana राजेंद्र सिंह राणा
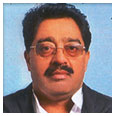

MLA, 16th Legislative Assembly
- In office Mar 2012 – Oct 2015
- Preceded by: Manoj Chaudhary
- Constituency: Deoband

MLA, 14th Legislative Assembly
- In office Feb 2002 – Mar 2007
- Preceded by: Sukhbeer Singh Pundir
- Succeeded by: Manoj Chaudhary
- Constituency: Deoband

Personal details
- Born: 1 July 1961 Deoband, Uttar Pradesh
- Died: 27 October 2015 (aged 54) Deoband
- Resting place: Deoband
- Citizenship: India
- Party: Samajwadi Party
- Spouse: Meena Singh (wife)
- Children: 1 son & 1 daughter.
- Parent: Man Singh (father)
- Profession: Journalism, Advocate & Politician

Rajendra Singh Rana (Hindi: राजेंद्र सिंह राणा) (1 July 1961 – 27 October 2015) was an Indian politician and a member of the 16th Legislative Assembly of Uttar Pradesh of India. He represented the Deoband constituency of Uttar Pradesh and was a member of the Samajwadi political party.

== Personal life and education ==
Rajendra Singh Rana was born in the district of Saharanpur, Uttar Pradesh. Rana held Bachelor of Laws degrees and a postgraduate diploma (in journalism). Before being elected as MLA, he used to work as an advocate and a journalist. Rana was suffering from cancer and died on 27 October 2015 due to the illness.

== Political career ==
Rajendra Singh Rana had been a MLA for two terms. During both his terms, he represented the Deoband constituency. Rana was also a State Minister in Mulayam Singh Yadav's government.

== Posts Held ==
#	From	To	Position	Comments
01	2002	2007	Member, 14th Legislative Assembly	
02	2012	2015	Member, 16th Legislative Assembly	Died during his term

== See also ==
- Deoband
- Government of India
- Politics of India
- Samajwadi Party
- Uttar Pradesh Legislative Assembly
