= Vidyasagar Nautiyal =

Indian politician

Vidyasagar Nautiyal (29 September 1933 – 12 February 2012) was an Indian politician, Hindi author and leader of Communist Party of India (CPI). He was elected as a member of Uttar Pradesh Legislative Assembly from Devprayag in 1980. He was the president of All India Students' Federation from 1959 to 1965.
