= Chandra Mohan Singh Negi =

Indian politician

Chandra Mohan Singh Negi (died 5 October 1992) was an Indian politician and a member of the 8th Lok Sabha and 9th Lok Sabha. He represented the Garhwal Lok Sabha Constituency and was a member of the Congress political party. He was also elected to the 5th and 8th Uttar Pradesh Assembly from Lansdowne Assembly constituency. He served as a minister in Chandra Bhanu Gupta, V. P. Singh and Sripati Mishra Cabinet. Had a close relation with Shri Surender Singh Negi and Shri Girdhari Lal Amoli. Girdhari Lal Amoli was The varisth zila upadhyaks From congress party and editor of Dainik Parvtiy.

== Positions held ==
Year	Description
1969–1974	Elected to the 5th Uttar Pradesh Assembly: Deputy Minister (1969–1970)
1980–1984	Elected to the 8th Uttar Pradesh Assembly: Minister of State (Independent Charge)
1984–1989	Elected to 8th Lok Sabha
1989–1991	Elected to 9th Lok Sabha: Member - Business Advisory Committee; Member - Consultative Committee, Ministry of Communication
