= Ranjeet Singh (Pakistani politician) =

Politician in Pakistan

Member of the Provincial Assembly of Khyber Pakhtunkhwa
- In office 13 August 2018 – 18 January 2023
- Preceded by: Fredrick Azeem
- Constituency: MR-3

Personal details
- Party: Jamiat Ulema-e-Islam (F)

Ranjeet Singh (Urdu: رنجیت سنگھ) is a Pakistani politician who was a member for the Provincial Assembly of Khyber Pakhtunkhwa from August 2018 to January 2023.

== Political career ==
He was elected to Provincial Assembly of Khyber Pakhtunkhwa on a reserved seat for minorities in the 2018 Pakistani general election representing Muttahida Majlis-e-Amal.
