= Constituency MR-3 =

- Constituency for the Khyber Pakhtunkhwa Assembly

Current constituency
- Member: Ranjeet Singh

Constituency MR-3 is a reserved constituency for minorities in the Khyber Pakhtunkhwa Assembly.

== See also ==
- Constituency WR-01
- Constituency WR-02
- Constituency WR-03
- Constituency WR-04
- Constituency WR-11
- Constituency WR-22
- Constituency MR-2
