= Ranjit Singh (race walker) =

Indian racewalker

Personal information
- Nationality: Indian
- Born: 25 November 1957 (age 68) Anandpur Sahib, India

Sport
- Sport: Athletics
- Event: Racewalking
Medal record
Men's athletics
Representing India
Asian Championships
Silver medal – second place	1981 Tokyo	20 km walk

Ranjit Singh (born 25 November 1957) is an Indian former race walker who competed in the men's 20 kilometres walk at the 1980 Summer Olympics, where he finished in 18th place. He won silver medal in 1981 Asian Athletics Championships held in Tokyo, Japan.

Singh was brought up in Anandpur Sahib, Rupnagar district in northern India. He served in Indian Army in Mahar Regiment from 1977 to 1992.

He was three times national champion in India and 5 times service's champion in the Indian Army. After he retired from the Indian army, he joined sports authority of India as a national athletics coach. He trained Indian athletes from 1993 to 2017 in India and overseas. He trained more than 100 national level athletes and international level athletes during his career.
