= Kuldip Kumar (Uttarakhand) =

Indian politician

Personal details
- Born: Mandi, Himachal Pradesh, India
- Party: Bharatiya Janata Party
- Spouse: Anamika
- Children: 2
- Parents: Santram (father); Laxmi Devi (mother)
- Profession: Politician

Kuldip Kumar is an Indian Politician from Bhartiya Janata Party currently serving as the Vice President of BJP Uttarakhand from Vikasnagar, Uttarakhand. He is also an ex Member of Uttarakhand Legislative Assembly (2009–12).

== Early life ==
Kuldeep Kumar was born in Mandi district of Himachal Pradesh. He is the son of Santram and Laxmi Devi.

== Political career ==
Kuldeep Kumar is an Indian Politician from Bhartiya Janata Party currently serving as the State General Secretary of Uttarakhand from Vikasnagar, Uttarakhand. He is also an ex Member of Uttarakhand Legislative Assembly (2009–12). He lost in 2012, to Nav Prabhat. He has been politically and socially active for a very long time. He was the Secretary Bar Association in Vikasnagar from 2002 to 2003, District President (2002-04) then State General Secretary (2004–07) of Hindu Jagran Manch and Member of District Panchayat (2003–07) in Bulakiwala. From 2007 to 2009 he served as the State General Secretary of Bharatiya Janata Yuva Morcha (BJYM). It was in 2009 when he was elected as the member of Uttarakhand Legislative Assembly. From 2015 to 2020 he also served as the Minister of BJP [Uttarakhand].And he was also State general secretary Of Uttarakhand from 2020 to 2022

In the 2nd Uttarakhand Legislative Assembly he was on the Committee on Estimates:

== Personal life ==
Kuldeep Kumar is married to Anamika and is the father of two kids, Akshat and Anshika.
