= Ranjit Singh (Odisha cricketer) =

Indian cricketer (born 1994)

Personal information
- Born: 23 December 1994 (age 31); Sundergarh, Odisha, India
- Source: Cricinfo, 12 December 2015

Ranjit Singh (born 23 December 1994) is an Indian cricketer who plays for Odisha. He made his first-class debut on 7 November 2015 in the 2015–16 Ranji Trophy.
