= Ranjeet Singh (Indian politician) =

Indian politician (1934–2019)

Ranjeet Singh Verma (4 October 1934 – 2 September 2019) was an Indian politician. He was a two term Member of the Uttar Pradesh Legislative Assembly. Singh represented Mussoorie assembly constituency.
