= Ranjith =

Renjith may refer to:

== Religion ==
- Anton Ranjith Pillainayagam (born 1966), Sri Lankan Tamil Catholic priest, Auxiliary Bishop of the Archdiocese of Colombo
- Malcolm Ranjith (born 1947), Sri Lankan Cardinal of the Catholic Church, Archbishop of Colombo

== Politics ==
- Ranjith Aluvihare (born 1958), Sri Lankan politician
- Ranjith Bandara (born 1961), Sri Lankan politician
- Ranjith Clemminck-Croci, Sri Lankan-born Dutch politician
- Ranjith Siyambalapitiya, Sri Lankan Minister of State Revenue and Finance and Deputy Minister of Finance and Planning

== Arts ==
- Ranjith (director), a popular Indian screenwriter and film director in Malayalam cinema
- Ranjith (singer), Indian playback singer who originally hails from Kerala
- Ranjith (actor), character artist who appears in Tamil, Telugu and Malayalam language films
- Ranjith Sankar, Indian screenwriter and film director in Malayalam cinema
- Ranjith Bajpe Tulu Movie Director known for First International Tulu Movie Nirel and Tulu Movie Dhand
- Pa. Ranjith, Tamil film director

== Sports ==
- Ranjith Amunugama (born 1969), former Sri Lankan cricketer
- Ranjith Kumar Jayaseelan, Indian Athlete
- Ranjith Madurasinghe (born 1961), Sri Lankan cricketer
- Renjith Maheshwary (born 1986), Indian triple jumper

== See also ==
- Ranjit (disambiguation)
- Ranjeet (disambiguation)
