= Brahm Dutt =

Indian politician

Brahm Dutt (27 March 1926 – 5 October 2014) was an Indian politician and a member of the 8th Lok Sabha & 9th Lok Sabha. He represented the Tehri Garhwal Lok Sabha Constituency and was a member of the Congress political party. He was also elected to the 8th Assembly of Uttar Pradesh from Mussoorie Assembly constituency.

== Positions held ==
Year	Description
1947–54	Gram Pradhan – Anfield Gram Sabha, Uttar Pradesh
1952–64	Chairman – Nagar Panchayat, Vikasnagar, Uttar Pradesh
1971–74	Chairman – Municipal Council, Vikas Nagar, Uttar Pradesh
1974–80	Elected to the Uttar Pradesh Legislative Council: Leader of the Opposition, Uttar Pradesh Legislative Council
1980–84	Elected to the 8th Uttar Pradesh Assembly: Minister of Planning, Power and Finance
1984–89	Elected to 8th Lok Sabha: Union Minister of State for Petroleum & Natural Gas (Independent Charge), Commerce and Finance
1989–91	Elected to 9th Lok Sabha: Member – Business Advisory Committee; Member – Consultative Committee (Ministry of Planning and Programme Implementation)
