= 3rd Uttarakhand Assembly =

Election

Third Uttarakhand Legislative Assembly

Type
- Type: Unicameral
- Houses: Uttarakhand Legislative Assembly

History
- Preceded by: 2nd Uttarakhand Assembly
- Succeeded by: 4th Uttarakhand Assembly

Leadership
- Speaker: Govind Singh Kunjwal, INC
- Deputy Speaker: Anusuya Prasad Maikhuri, INC
- Leader of the House: Vijay Bahuguna (2012–2014), INC; Harish Rawat (2014–2017), INC
- Leader of the Opposition: Ajay Bhatt, BJP
- Chief Secretary: Devi Prasad Gairola, IAS

Structure
- Seats: 71^{[†]}
- Political groups: Government (42): INC (36); BSP (2); UKD(P) (1); Independent (3); Opposition (28): BJP (28); Nominated (1): INC (1)
- Length of term: 2012–2017

Elections
- Voting system: first-past-the-post
- Last election: 30 January 2012
- Next election: 15 February 2017

Meeting place
- Vidhan Bhavan, Dehradun, Uttarakhand

Website
- Uttarakhand Legislative Assembly

Constitution
- Constitution of India

Footnotes
- ^† 70 seats are open for the direct election while 1 seat is reserved for the member of Anglo-Indian community.

The 2012 Uttarakhand Legislative Assembly election were the third Vidhan Sabha (Legislative Assembly) election of the state. Elections were held on 30 January 2012 when Indian National Congress emerged as the largest party with 32 seats in the 71-seat legislature and formed the government with the help of Bahujan Samaj Party, Uttarakhand Kranti Dal (P) and Independents. The Bharatiya Janata Party with 31 seats served as the official opposition.

The Indian National Congress emerged as the largest party with 32 seats in a house of 71. They were still four short of the majority to form a government. After much wrangling it was announced that the Bahujan Samaj Party, Uttarakhand Kranti Dal (P) and the three Independents would be supporting the government. The incumbent Bharatiya Janata Party Government lost as they had only 31 seats out of 71 seats, lagging just one seat behind Indian National Congress.

After protracted discussions it was announced the Vijay Bahuguna would be Chief Minister and Harish Rawat would continue to serve as the Union Minister for Water Resources in the UPA government at Union level.

== Party position in the Assembly ==
Rank	Party	Abbr.	Seats	Leader in the House
1	Indian National Congress	INC	37	Vijay Bahuguna (2012–2014); Harish Rawat (2014–2017)
2	Bahujan Samaj Party	BSP	02	Hari Das
3	Uttarakhand Kranti Dal (P)	UKD(P)	01	Pritam Singh Panwar
4	Independent	Ind.	03	N/A
5	Bharatiya Janata Party	BJP	28	Ajay Bhatt
	Total		71	

== Key post holders in the Assembly ==
- Speaker : Govind Singh Kunjwal
- Deputy Speaker : Anusuya Prasad Maikhuri
- Leader of the House: Vijay Bahuguna (2012–2014)
  Harish Rawat (2014–2017)
- Leader of the Opposition : Ajay Bhatt
- Chief Secretary : Devi Prasad Gairola

== Members of the Third Uttarakhand Assembly ==
S. No.	Constituency	Elected Member	Party affiliation
1	Purola (SC)	Mal Chand	BJP
2	Yamunotri	Pritam Singh Panwar	UKD(P)
3	Gangotri	Vijaypal Singh Sajwan	INC
4	Badrinath	Rajendra Singh Bhandari	INC
5	Tharali (SC)	Prof. Jeet Ram	INC
6	Karnaprayag	Dr. Anusuya Prasad Maikhuri	INC
7	Kedarnath	Shaila Rani Rawat	INC
8	Rudraprayag	Dr. Harak Singh Rawat	INC
9	Ghansali (SC)	Bhim Lal Arya	BJP
10	Devprayag	Mantri Prasad Naithani	Independent
11	Narendranagar	Subodh Uniyal	INC
12	Pratapnagar	Vikram Singh Negi	INC
13	Tehri	Dinesh Dhanai	Independent
14	Dhanaulti	Mahavir Singh Rangarh	BJP
15	Chakrata (ST)	Pritam Singh	INC
16	Vikasnagar	Nav Prabhat	INC
17	Sahaspur	Sahdev Singh Pundir	BJP
18	Dharampur	Dinesh Agrawal	INC
19	Raipur	Umesh Sharma 'Kau'	INC
20	Rajpur Road (SC)	Rajkumar	INC
21	Dehradun Cantonment	Harbans Kapoor	BJP
22	Mussoorie	Ganesh Joshi	BJP
23	Doiwala	Dr. Ramesh Pokhriyal 'Nishank'^{#}	BJP
24	Rishikesh	Premchand Aggarwal	BJP
25	Haridwar	Madan Kaushik	BJP
26	BHEL Ranipur	Adesh Chauhan	BJP
27	Jwalapur (SC)	Chandra Shekhar	BJP
28	Bhagwanpur (SC)	Surendra Rakesh^{†}	BSP
29	Jhabrera (SC)	Hari Das	BSP
30	Piran Kaliyar	Furqan Ahmad	INC
31	Roorkee	Pradip Batra	INC
32	Khanpur	Pranav Singh 'Champion'	INC
33	Manglaur	Sarwat Karim Ansari	BSP
34	Laksar	Sanjay Gupta	BJP
35	Haridwar Rural	Yatishwaranand	BJP
36	Yamkeshwar	Vijaya Barthwal	BJP
37	Pauri (SC)	Sundar Lal Mandrawal	INC
38	Srinagar	Ganesh Godiyal	INC
39	Chaubattakhal	Tirath Singh Rawat	BJP
40	Lansdowne	Dilip Singh Rawat	BJP
41	Kotdwar	Surendra Singh Negi	INC
42	Dharchula	Harish Singh Dhami^{‡}	INC
43	Didihat	Bishan Singh Chuphal	BJP
44	Pithoragarh	Mayukh Singh Mahar	INC
45	Gangolihat (SC)	Narayan Ram Arya	INC
46	Kapkot	Lalit Pharswan	INC
47	Bageshwar (SC)	Chandan Ram Das	BJP
48	Dwarahat	Madan Singh Bisht	INC
49	Salt	Surendra Singh Jeena	BJP
50	Ranikhet	Ajay Bhatt	BJP
51	Someshwar (SC)	Ajay Tamta^{#}	BJP
52	Almora	Manoj Tiwari	INC
53	Jageshwar	Govind Singh Kunjwal	INC
54	Lohaghat	Puran Singh Phartyal	BJP
55	Champawat	Hemesh Kharkwal	INC
56	Lalkuan	Harish Chandra Durgapal	Independent
57	Bhimtal	Dan Singh Bhandari	BJP
58	Nainital (SC)	Sarita Arya	INC
59	Haldwani	Dr. Indira Hridayesh	INC
60	Kaladhungi	Banshidhar Bhagat	BJP
61	Ramnagar	Amrita Rawat	INC
62	Jaspur	Dr. Shailendra Mohan Singhal	INC
63	Kashipur	Harbhajan Singh Cheema	BJP
64	Bajpur (SC)	Yashpal Arya	INC
65	Gadarpur	Arvind Pandey	BJP
66	Rudrapur	Rajkumar Thukral	BJP
67	Kichha	Rajesh Shukla	BJP
68	Sitarganj	Kiran Mandal^{‡}	BJP
69	Nanakmatta (ST)	Dr. Prem Singh Rana	BJP
70	Khatima	Pushkar Singh Dhami	BJP
71	Anglo-Indian	Russell Valentine Gardner	INC

=== By-elections ===
S. No.	Constituency	Elected Member	Party affiliation
23	Doiwala	Hira Singh Bisht	INC
28	Bhagwanpur (SC)	Mamta Rakesh	INC
42	Dharchula	Harish Rawat	INC
51	Someshwar (SC)	Rekha Arya	INC
68	Sitarganj	Vijay Bahuguna	INC

== See also ==
- 2012 Uttarakhand Legislative Assembly election
- Vijay Bahuguna ministry
- Harish Rawat ministry
- Progressive Democratic Front (Uttarakhand)
- Politics of Uttarakhand

== Notes ==
- ^{†} – Died in office
- ^{‡} – Resigned from office
- ^{#} – Elected to the 16th Lok Sabha
