= Vijay Bahuguna ministry =

Cabinet of Uttarakhand, 2012–2014

- 7th Ministry of Uttarakhand
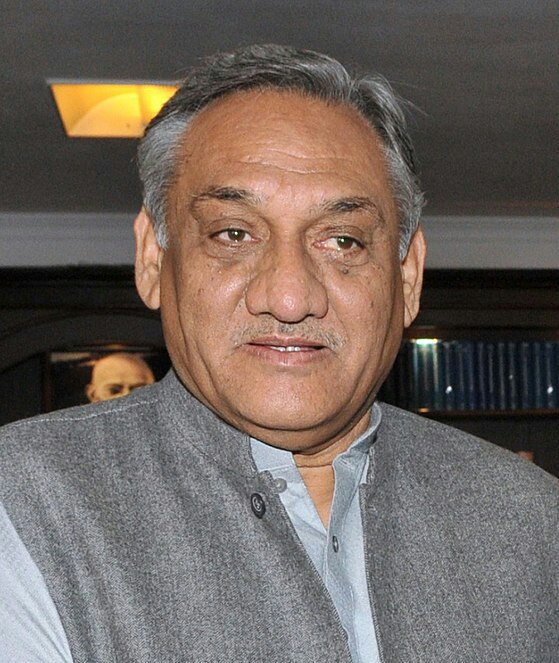
- Vijay Bahuguna
- Date formed: 13 March 2012
- Date dissolved: 31 January 2014

People and organisations
- Head of state: Margaret Alva; Aziz Qureshi
- Head of government: Vijay Bahuguna
- Member parties: Indian National Congress; Bahujan Samaj Party; Uttarakhand Kranti Dal (P); Independents
- Status in legislature: Majority
- Opposition party: Bharatiya Janata Party
- Opposition leader: Ajay Bhatt

History
- Incoming formation: 3rd Assembly
- Election: 2012
- Legislature term: 5 years
- Predecessor: Second Khanduri ministry
- Successor: Harish Rawat ministry

The Vijay Bahuguna ministry was the Cabinet of Uttarakhand headed by the Chief Minister of Uttarakhand, Vijay Bahuguna from 2012 to 2014.

== Council of Ministers ==
S.No	Name	Constituency	Department	Party
1.	Vijay Bahuguna; Chief Minister	Sitarganj	Home; Personnel; Vigilance; Information; Excise; Forest; Environment; Housing; Industries; Energy; Technical Education; Higher Education; Law; Justice; Eradication of Corruption; Other departments not allocated to any Minister	INC
Cabinet Ministers
2.	Indira Hridayesh	Haldwani	Finance; Commercial Taxes; Stamp and Registration; Entertainment Tax; Parliamentary Affairs; Legislative Affairs; Election; Census; Languages; Protocol	INC
3.	Yashpal Arya	Bajpur (SC)	Revenue; Land Management; Disaster Management and Rehabilitation; Irrigation; Rural Engineering Services; Flood Control; Watershed Management; Cooperatives	INC
4.	Harak Singh Rawat	Rudraprayag	Agriculture; Agriculture Marketing; Agriculture Education; Medical Education; Sainik Welfare	INC
5.	Surendra Singh Negi	Kotdwar	Health and Family Welfare; AYUSH; Science and Technology; Biotechnology; Sugarcane Development; Sugar	INC
6.	Pritam Singh	Chakrata (ST)	Food and Civil Supplies; Minor Irrigation; Rural Development; Panchayati Raj	INC
7.	Amrita Rawat	Ramnagar	Women and Child Development; Tourism; Culture; Renewable Energy	INC
8.	Dinesh Agrawal	Dharampur	Planning; Information Technology; Sports; Youth Welfare	INC
9.	Mantri Prasad Naithani	Devprayag	School Education; Drinking Water	IND
10.	Pritam Singh Panwar	Yamunotri	Urban Development; Urban Poverty Alleviation; Animal Husbandry; Fisheries; Civil Defence and Home Guards; Horticulture; Prison	UKD(P)
11.	Harish Chandra Durgapal	Lalkuan	Labour; Employment; Micro and Small Enterprises; Khadi and Village Industries; Dairy Development	IND
12.	Surendra Rakesh	Bhagwanpur (SC)	Social Welfare; Transport	BSP
