= Progressive Democratic Front (Uttarakhand) =

- Chairman: Shishpal Singh (BSP)
- Founded: 2014
- Headquarters: Dehradun, Uttarakhand
- Alliance: Bahujan Samaj Party; Uttarakhand Kranti Dal; Independents (2014–17)
- Seats in Rajya Sabha: 0 / 3
- Seats in Lok Sabha: 0 / 5
- Seats in Uttarakhand Legislative Assembly: 1 / 70

The Progressive Democratic Front (abbr. PDF) was a political front in the Indian state of Uttarakhand. It was founded in 2014 and consisted of the two regional political forces in the state, Bahujan Samaj Party and Uttarakhand Kranti Dal with Independent MLAs. The PDF was a part of the Indian National Congress led United Progressive Alliance in the state between 2014–2017.

== Background ==
PDF was formed in January 2014 just before the leadership change in the INC-ruled Uttarakhand when Vijay Bahuguna was replaced by Harish Rawat as the new Chief Minister of Uttarakhand. Three members of Bahujan Samaj Party, one of Uttarakhand Kranti Dal (P) and three Independent MLAs joined hands to consolidate their critical and key position in the Uttarakhand Legislative Assembly where no party enjoyed the majority by itself. Both the INC and Bharatiya Janata Party relying on their support to achieve majority in the house to form the government. As previously they allied with the Congress-led Bahuguna government independently. PDF after forming a front continued to give support of its 7 MLAs to the new Harish Rawat government and bagged 5 cabinet ministerial birth as the result of power-sharing agreement.

== Current status ==
Currently, the PDF has one seat in the 5th Uttarakhand Assembly.

No.	Party	Name	Constituency
1	Bahujan Samaj Party	Muhammad Shahzad	Laksar

=== Former PDF MLAs of the Uttarakhand Legislative Assembly ===
No.	Party	Name	Constituency
1	Bahujan Samaj Party	Hari Das	Jhabrera
2	Bahujan Samaj Party	Sarwat Karim Ansari	Manglaur
3	Bahujan Samaj Party	Surendra Rakesh	Bhagwanpur
4	Uttarakhand Kranti Dal (P)	Pritam Singh Panwar	Yamunotri
5	Independent	Dinesh Dhanai	Tehri
6	Independent	Harish Chandra Durgapal	Lalkuan
7	Independent	Mantri Prasad Naithani	Devprayag

== See also ==
- Political alliance
- Politics of Uttarakhand
