= 2012 Uttarakhand Legislative Assembly election =

- 30 January 2012

70 seats in the Uttarakhand Legislative Assembly 36 seats needed for a majority
- Turnout: 66.17% (▲6.72%)
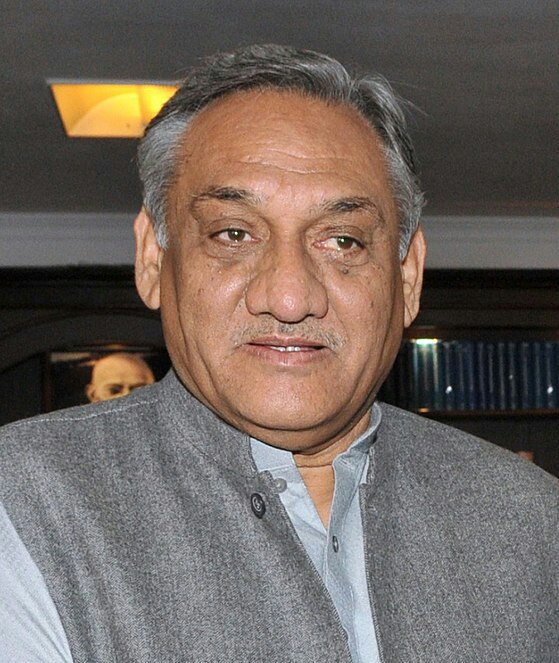

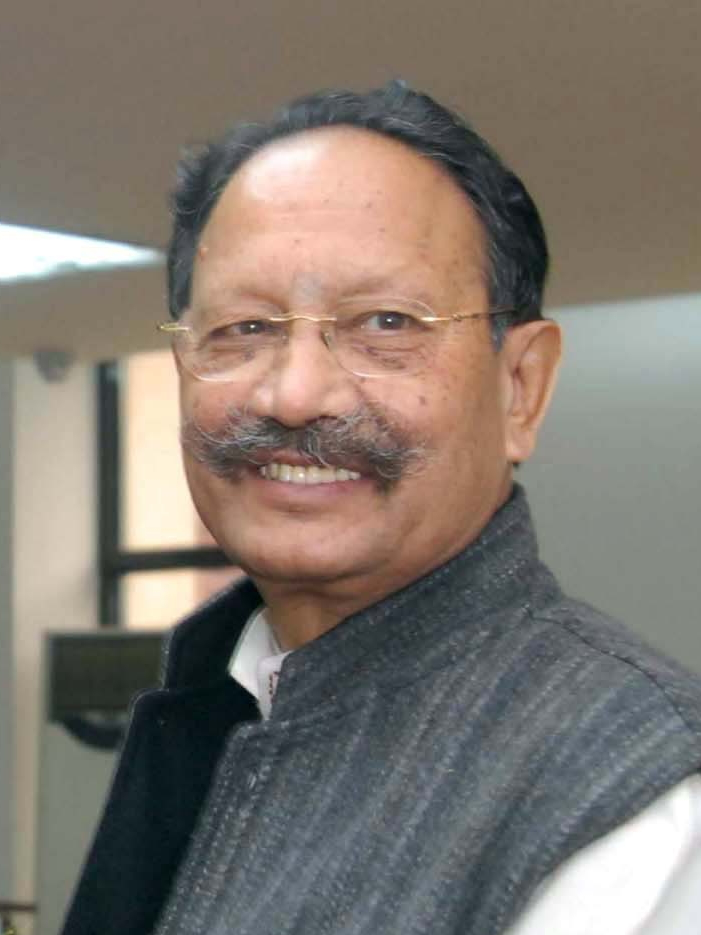
	Majority party	Minority party	Third party
			BSP
Leader	Vijay Bahuguna	Bhuwan Chandra Khanduri	Hari Das
Party	INC	BJP	BSP
Alliance	Post-poll alliance with BSP, UKD(P) and Independents		Post-poll alliance with INC, UKD(P) and Independents
Leader since	2012	2007	2012
Leader's seat	Sitarganj (by-election)	Kotdwar (lost)	Jhabrera
Last election	21	35	8
Seats won	32	31	3
Seat change	▲11	▼4	▼5
Popular vote	14,36,042	14,08,341	5,18,257
Percentage	33.79%	33.13%	12.19%
Swing	▲4.2%	▲1.23%	▲0.43%
- Constituencies of the Uttarakhand Legislative Assembly

- Structure of the Uttarakhand Legislative Assembly after the election
Chief Minister before election
Bhuwan Chandra Khanduri
BJP
Elected Chief Minister
Vijay Bahuguna
INC

The 2012 Uttarakhand Legislative Assembly election were the 3rd Vidhan Sabha (Legislative Assembly) election of the state of Uttarakhand in India. Elections were held on 30 January 2012 when Indian National Congress emerged as the largest party with 32 seats in the 70-seat legislature and formed the government with the help of Progressive Democratic Front alliance (Bahujan Samaj Party, Uttarakhand Kranti Dal (P) and Independents). The Bharatiya Janata Party with 31 seats served as the official opposition. , The election was the closest in Uttarakhand's history where the Indian National Congress (INC) emerged as the single largest party by just a one-seat margin over the BJP. In terms of popular vote too, the Congress won a narrow plurality by 33.79% compared to BJP's 33.13%, a difference of just 0.66%.

== Parties and alliances ==
Party	Flag	Symbol	Leader	Seats contested
Bharatiya Janata Party			B. C. Khanduri	70
Indian National Congress			Vijay Bahuguna	70
Bahujan Samaj Party			Mayawati	70
Uttarakhand Kranti Dal (P)			Trivendra Singh Panwar	44
Uttarakhand Raksha Morcha				42
Uttarkhand Janwadi Party				2
Samajwadi Party				45
Independent Candidates				216
Total Number of Candidates				788

== Results ==
Party	INC	BJP	Independents	BSP	UKD(P)	Others
Leader	Yashpal Arya	B. C. Khanduri	N/A	Hari Das	Pritam Singh Panwar	N/A
Votes	33.79%,1436042	33.13%,1408341	12.34%,524549	12.19%,518257	1.93%,82176	6.62%,281039
Seats	32 (45.71%)	31 (44.28%)	3 (4.23%)	3 (4.23%)	1 (1.43%)	–
Seats	32 / 70	31 / 70	3 / 70	3 / 70	1 / 70	0 / 70

← Summary of the 30 January 2012 Uttarakhand Legislative Assembly election results
Parties and coalitions	Popular vote			Seats	
Parties and coalitions	Votes	%	±pp	Won	+/−
Indian National Congress (INC)	1,436,042	33.79	▼0.3	32	▼11
Bharatiya Janata Party (BJP)	1,408,341	33.13		31	▼4
Bahujan Samaj Party (BSP)	518,257	12.19		3	▼4
Uttarakhand Kranti Dal (UKDP)	82,176	1.93		1	▼1
Independents (IND)	524,549	12.34		3	Steady
Others	281,039	6.62	—N/a		
Total	4,975,494	100.00		70	±0
Valid votes	42,50,314	100.00			
Votes cast / turnout	42,50,314	66.65			
Abstentions	21,27,016	33.35			
Registered voters	63,77,330				

=== Results by division ===
Divisions	Seats					
Divisions	Seats	INC	BJP	BSP	UKD	IND
Garhwal	41	19	16	3	1	2
Kumaon	29	13	15	—N/a	—N/a	1
Total	70	32	31	3	1	3

=== Results by district ===
Division	Districts	Seats					
Division	Districts	Seats	INC	BJP	BSP	UKD	IND
Garhwal	Uttarkashi	3	1	1	—N/a	1	—N/a
Garhwal	Chamoli	3	3	—N/a	—N/a	—N/a	—N/a
Garhwal	Rudraprayag	2	2	—N/a	—N/a	—N/a	—N/a
Garhwal	Tehri Garhwal	6	2	2	—N/a	—N/a	2
Garhwal	Dehradun	10	5	5	—N/a	—N/a	—N/a
Garhwal	Haridwar	11	3	5	3	—N/a	—N/a
Garhwal	Pauri Garhwal	6	3	3	—N/a	—N/a	—N/a
Kumaon	Pithoragarh	4	3	1	—N/a	—N/a	—N/a
Kumaon	Bageshwar	2	1	1	—N/a	—N/a	—N/a
Kumaon	Almora	6	3	3	—N/a	—N/a	—N/a
Kumaon	Champawat	2	1	1	—N/a	—N/a	—N/a
Kumaon	Nainital	6	3	2	—N/a	—N/a	1
Kumaon	Udham Singh Nagar	9	2	7	—N/a	—N/a	—N/a
Total		70	32	31	3	1	3

The Indian National Congress emerged as the largest party with 32 seats in a house of 70. They were still four short of the majority to form a government. After much wrangling it was announced that the Bahujan Samaj Party, Uttarakhand Kranti Dal (P) and the three Independents would be supporting the government. The incumbent Bharatiya Janata Party Government lost as they had only 31 seats out of 70 seats, lagging just one seat behind Indian National Congress.

After protracted discussions it was announced the Vijay Bahuguna would be Chief Minister and Harish Rawat would continue to serve as the Union Minister for Water Resources in the UPA government at Union level.

== List of elected Assembly members ==
District	Constituency		Winner				Runner-up				Margin
District	#	Name	Candidate	Party	Votes	%	Candidate	Party	Votes	%	Margin
Uttarkashi	1	Purola (SC)	Mal Chand	BJP	18,098	39.75	Rajkumar	IND	14,266	31.33	3,832
Uttarkashi	2	Yamunotri	Pritam Singh Panwar	UKD	15,909	36.21	Kedar Singh Rawat	INC	13,313	30.30	2,596
Uttarkashi	3	Gangotri	Vijaypal Singh Sajwan	INC	20,246	40.13	Gopal Singh Rawat	BJP	13,223	26.21	7,023
Chamoli	4	Badrinath	Rajendra Singh Bhandari	INC	21,492	39.08	Prem Ballabh Bhatt	BJP	11,291	20.53	10,201
Chamoli	5	Tharali (SC)	Dr. Jeet Ram	INC	17,404	32.86	Magan Lal	BJP	16,731	31.59	673
Chamoli	6	Karnaprayag	Anusuya Prasad Maikhuri	INC	11,147	22.78	Surendra Singh Negi	IND	10,920	22.31	227
Rudraprayag	7	Kedarnath	Shaila Rani Rawat	INC	19,960	42.04	Asha Nautiyal	BJP	17,632	37.13	2,328
Rudraprayag	8	Rudraprayag	Harak Singh Rawat	INC	15,469	29.65	Matbar Singh Kandari	BJP	14,143	27.10	1,326
Tehri Garhwal	9	Ghanshali (SC)	Bhim Lal Arya	BJP	24,254	58.65	Dhani Lal Shah	INC	10,560	25.53	13,694
Tehri Garhwal	10	Devprayag	Mantri Prasad Naithani	IND	12,294	30.61	Diwakar Bhatt	BJP	10,753	26.77	1,541
Tehri Garhwal	11	Narendranagar	Subodh Uniyal	INC	21,220	43.47	Om Gopal Rawat	BJP	20,819	42.65	401
Tehri Garhwal	12	Pratapnagar	Vikram Singh Negi	INC	12,135	31.38	Vijay Singh Panwar	BJP	11,593	29.98	542
Tehri Garhwal	13	Tehri	Dinesh Dhanai	IND	12,026	29.77	Kishore Upadhyaya	INC	11,649	28.83	377
Tehri Garhwal	14	Dhanaulti	Mahaveer Singh	BJP	12,081	26.40	Manmohan Singh	INC	10,933	23.89	1,148
Dehradun	15	Chakrata (ST)	Pritam Singh	INC	33,187	51.16	Munna Singh Chauhan	UJP	26,533	40.90	6,654
Dehradun	16	Vikasnagar	Nav Prabhat	INC	32,742	48.34	Kuldeep Kumar	BJP	22,885	33.79	9,857
Dehradun	17	Sahaspur	Sahdev Singh Pundir	BJP	26,064	31.28	Aryendra Sharma	INC	20,574	24.69	5,490
Dehradun	18	Dharampur	Dinesh Agarwal	INC	37,884	50.38	Prakash Suman Dhyani	BJP	28,464	37.86	9,420
Dehradun	19	Raipur	Umesh Sharma (Kau)	INC	29,900	39.05	Trivendra Singh Rawat	BJP	29,426	38.43	474
Dehradun	20	Rajpur Road (SC)	Rajkumar	INC	28,291	46.98	Ravinder Singh Kataria	BJP	25,221	41.88	3,070
Dehradun	21	Dehradun Cantt.	Harbans Kapoor	BJP	29,719	47.43	Devendra Singh Sethi	INC	24,624	39.30	5,095
Dehradun	22	Mussoorie	Ganesh Joshi	BJP	28,097	44.53	Jot Singh Gunsola	INC	18,321	29.04	9,776
Dehradun	23	Doiwala	Ramesh Pokhriyal Nishank	BJP	23,448	30.68	Heera Singh Bisht	INC	22,176	29.01	1,272
Dehradun	24	Rishikesh	Premchand Aggarwal	BJP	29,090	35.88	Rajpal Kharola	INC	21,819	26.91	7,271
Haridwar	25	Haridwar	Madan Kaushik	BJP	42,297	51.31	Satpal Brahamchari	INC	33,677	40.85	8,620
Haridwar	26	B.H.E.L. Ranipur	Adesh Chauhan	BJP	26,402	34.01	Ambris Kumar	IND	19,791	25.50	6,611
Haridwar	27	Jwalapur (SC)	Chander Shakhar	BJP	21,303	30.26	Madan Lal	BSP	20,745	29.46	558
Haridwar	28	Bhagwanpur (SC)	Surendra Rakesh	BSP	36,828	46.89	Satyapal Singh	INC	30,047	38.26	6,781
Haridwar	29	Jhabrera (SC)	Hari Dass	BSP	22,781	32.87	Rajpal	INC	18,972	27.37	3,809
Haridwar	30	Piran Kaliyar	Furkan Ahmad	INC	25,870	35.05	Shahzad	BSP	23,926	32.41	1,944
Haridwar	31	Roorkee	Pardeep Batra	INC	23,164	37.77	Suresh Chand Jain	BJP	22,363	36.47	801
Haridwar	32	Khanpur	Kunwar Pranav Singh Champion	INC	23,072	26.26	Ch. Kulveer Singh	BSP	20,241	23.03	2,831
Haridwar	33	Manglaur	Sarwat Kareem Ansari	BSP	24,706	34.03	Qazi Md. Nizamuddin	INC	24,008	33.07	698
Haridwar	34	Laksar	Sanjay Gupta	BJP	25,945	39.41	Haji Taslim Ahmed	BSP	15,551	23.62	10,394
Haridwar	35	Haridwar Rural	Yatishvaranand	BJP	25,159	32.40	Irshad Ali	INC	21,284	27.41	3,875
Pauri Garhwal	36	Yamkeshwar	Vijay Brathwal	BJP	13,842	32.20	Sarojani Devi	INC	10,301	23.96	3,541
Pauri Garhwal	37	Pauri (SC)	Sunder Lal Mandrawal	INC	19,389	42.82	Ghananand	BJP	16,483	36.40	2,906
Pauri Garhwal	38	Srinagar	Ganesh Godiyal	INC	27,993	51.27	Dr Dhan Singh Rawat	BJP	22,930	41.99	5,063
Pauri Garhwal	39	Chaubattakhal	Teerath Singh	BJP	14,741	33.78	Rajpal Singh Bisht	INC	12,777	29.28	1,964
Pauri Garhwal	40	Lansdowne	Daleep Singh Rawat	BJP	15,324	38.70	Tejpal Singh Rawat	URM	9,886	24.97	5,438
Pauri Garhwal	41	Kotdwar	Surendra Singh Negi	INC	31,797	51.19	B. C. Khanduri	BJP	27,174	43.75	4,623
Pithoragarh	42	Dharchula	Harish Dhami	INC	15,739	33.19	Khushal Singh	BJP	10,433	22.00	5,306
Pithoragarh	43	Didihat	Bishan Singh Chuphal	BJP	21,089	46.78	Rewati Joshi	INC	10,472	23.23	10,617
Pithoragarh	44	Pithoragarh	Mayukh Singh	INC	33,976	59.71	Prakash Pant	BJP	20,779	36.52	13,197
Pithoragarh	45	Gangolihat (SC)	Narayanram Arya	INC	24,648	50.74	Geeta Thakur Gowal	BJP	16,768	34.52	7,880
Bageshwar	46	Kapkot	Lalit Farswan	INC	22,335	43.50	Balwant Singh	BJP	20,966	40.83	1,369
Bageshwar	47	Bageshwar (SC)	Chandan Ram Dass	BJP	23,396	38.91	Ram Prasad Tamta	INC	21,485	35.73	1,911
Almora	48	Dwarahat	Madan Singh Bisht	INC	14,798	33.96	Pushpesh Tripathi	UKD	11,472	26.33	3,326
Almora	49	Salt	Surendra Singh Jeena	BJP	23,956	51.08	Ranjeet Rawat	INC	18,512	39.47	5,444
Almora	50	Ranikhet	Ajay Bhatt	BJP	14,089	35.88	Karan Mahara	INC	14,011	35.68	78
Almora	51	Someshwar (SC)	Ajay Tamta	BJP	17,288	39.64	Rekha Arya	IND	14,597	33.47	2,691
Almora	52	Almora	Manoj Tiwari	INC	16,211	34.07	Raghunath Singh Chauhan	BJP	15,030	31.59	1,181
Almora	53	Jageshwar	Govind Singh Kunjwal	INC	18,175	39.01	Bachi Singh	BJP	14,310	30.71	3,865
Champawat	54	Lohaghat	Sri Puran Singh	BJP	30,429	59.07	Sri Mahendra Singh Mahra	INC	18,894	36.68	11,535
Champawat	55	Champawat	Sri Hemesh Kharkwal	INC	20,330	40.51	Sri Madan Singh	BSP	13,377	26.66	6,953
Nainital	56	Lalkuan	Harish Chandra Durgapal	IND	25,189	37.37	Nawin Chandra Dumka	BJP	16,341	24.24	8,848
Nainital	57	Bhimtal	Dan Singh Bhandari	BJP	21,494	37.85	Mohan Pal	BSP	15,051	26.50	6,443
Nainital	58	Nainital (SC)	Sarita Arya	INC	25,563	49.71	Hem Chandra Arya	BJP	19,255	37.45	6,308
Nainital	59	Haldwani	Indira Hridyesh	INC	42,627	52.89	Renu Adhikari	BJP	19,044	23.63	23,583
Nainital	60	Kaladhungi	Banshidhar Bhagat	BJP	22,744	28.89	Prakash Joshi	INC	20,374	25.88	2,370
Nainital	61	Ramnagar	Amrita Rawat	INC	23,851	37.00	Diwan Singh Bisht	BJP	20,122	31.21	3,729
Udham Singh Nagar	62	Jaspur	Dr. Shailendra Mohan Singhal	INC	25,533	33.34	Mohammad Umar	BSP	22,753	29.71	2,780
Udham Singh Nagar	63	Kashipur	Harbhajan Singh Cheema	BJP	31,734	38.72	Manoj Joshi	INC	29,352	35.82	2,382
Udham Singh Nagar	64	Bajpur (SC)	Yashpal Arya	INC	38,524	45.94	Rajesh Kumar	BJP	23,393	27.89	15,131
Udham Singh Nagar	65	Gadarpur	Arvind Pande	BJP	27,976	33.00	Jarnail Singh	IND	22,843	26.95	5,133
Udham Singh Nagar	66	Rudrapur	Raj Kumar Thukral	BJP	37,291	39.78	Tilak Raj Behar	INC	33,337	35.56	3,954
Udham Singh Nagar	67	Kichha	Rajesh Shukla	BJP	33,388	45.82	Sarwar Yar Khan	INC	25,162	34.53	8,226
Udham Singh Nagar	68	Sitarganj	Kiran Mandal	BJP	29,280	39.69	Narayan Pal	BSP	16,668	22.60	12,612
Udham Singh Nagar	69	Nanak Matta (ST)	Prem Singh Rana	BJP	26,652	39.56	Gopal Singh Rana	INC	21,021	31.21	5,631
Udham Singh Nagar	70	Khatima	Pushkar Singh Dhami	BJP	20,586	29.91	Davendra Chand	INC	15,192	22.07	5,394

== See also ==
- 3rd Uttarakhand Assembly
- Bahuguna ministry
- Harish Rawat ministry
- Elections in Uttarakhand
- Politics of Uttarakhand
- 2012 elections in India
