= Timeline of the 2014 Indian general election =

Indian lower house election timeline

This article outlines the events leading up to the 2014 Indian general election from 7 April to 12 May 2014, starting with the prior election in 2009.

== Pre poll ==
=== 2009–2012 ===
==== 2009 ====
- 16 May: Result for 2009 general election are declared. Incumbent UPA government retains a majority in parliament.
- 16 May: Result for Legislative Assembly elections declared.
  - INC leader Y. S. Rajasekhara Reddy is elected as Chief Minister of Andhra Pradesh.
  - BJD chairperson Naveen Patnaik is elected as Chief Minister of Odisha.
  - SDF chairperson Pawan Kumar Chamling is elected as Chief Minister of Sikkim for an unprecedented fourth consecutive term.
- 18 May: 14th Lok Sabha dissolved by the President with immediate effect.
- 18 May: Manmohan Singh submits the resignation of his Council of Ministers to the President.
- 22 May: Second government of Manmohan Singh sworn in.
- 1 June: Inaugural session of 15th Lok Sabha.
- 15 August: 62nd Independence Day celebrated.
- 2 September: Y. S. Rajasekhara Reddy, the Chief Minister of Andhra Pradesh dies in a tragic helicopter crash.
- 22 October: Result for Legislative Assembly elections declared.
  - INC incumbent Dorjee Khandu is elected as Chief Minister of Arunachal Pradesh.
  - INC incumbent Bhupinder Singh Hooda is elected as Chief Minister of Haryana.
  - INC incumbent Ashok Chavan is elected as Chief Minister of Maharashtra.
- 23 December: BJP, JD(U) and JMM strike a deal to form a government in Jharkhand after an election returned a hung assembly.

==== 2010 ====
- 26 January: Diamond Jubilee of Indian Republic. 60th Republic Day celebrated.
- 12 March: India and Russia signs a nuclear reactor deal.
- 1 April: The Right of Children to Free and Compulsory Education Act to provide free and compulsory education comes into force.
- 3 October: XIX Commonwealth Games held in Delhi.
- 24 November: BJP and JD(U) alliance wins election in Bihar. Incumbent Nitish Kumar is sworn in as Chief Minister of Bihar.
- 30 December: Srikrishna Committee on Telangana submits its report to the Ministry of Home Affairs.

==== 2011 ====
- 2 February: Telecom Minister A. Raja sent to Tihar Jail in 2G spectrum case.
- 5 April: Anna Hazare undertakes fast for Jan Lokpal Bill
- 13 May: Result for Legislative Assembly elections declared.
  - INC incumbent Tarun Gogoi is elected as Chief Minister of Assam.
  - Oommen Chandy of UDF alliance is elected as Chief Minister of Kerala.
  - N. Rangaswamy is elected as Chief Minister of Puducherry.
  - AIADMK leader J. Jayalalithaa is elected as Chief Minister of Tamil Nadu.
  - AITMC chairperson Mamata Banerjee is elected as Chief Minister of West Bengal defeating the longest serving democratically elected Communist government in the world after the 34-year rule of the Left Front government.

==== 2012 ====
- 6 March: Result for Legislative Assembly elections declared.
  - BJP wins a majority in an election for legislative assembly of Goa. Manohar Parrikar is sworn in as Chief Minister.
  - Election in Manipur returns incumbent Okram Ibobi Singh to be re-elected for the post of Chief Minister.
  - SAD – BJP alliance led by Parkash Singh Badal wins elections in Punjab despite a traditional anti-incumbency.
  - Elections in Uttarakhand leads to a hung assembly. Vijay Bahuguna of INC is sworn in as Chief Minister.
  - Akhilesh Yadav, son of SP chairperson Mulayam Singh is sworn in as Chief Minister of Uttar Pradesh.
- 22 July: Finance Minister Pranab Mukherjee is elected as the 13th president of the Republic.
- 20 December: Result for Legislative Assembly elections declared.
  - BJP leader Narendra Modi forms the state government in Gujarat for the fourth consecutive term in an election.
  - INC leader Virbhadra Singh is elected as Chief Minister of Himachal Pradesh.

=== 2013 ===
- February: Election to state assembly of Tripura returns CPI(M) leader Manik Sarkar as Chief Minister.
- An election in Meghalaya sees incumbent Mukul Sangma to be re-elected for the post of Chief Minister.
- NPF leader Neiphiu Rio is re-elected as Chief Minister in an election.
- 8 May: Election to state assembly of Karnataka gives a majority to INC with Siddaramaiah being sworn in as Chief Minister.
- 10 June: BJP leader Narendra Modi is declared as the head of poll campaign for the party.
- 13 September: BJP leader and four time CM of Gujarat Narendra Modi is chosen as the Prime Ministerial candidate for the party.
- 8 December: Result for Legislative Assembly elections declared.
  - A high voltage election to state assembly of Delhi resulted in a hung assembly with BJP winning largest number of seats. The newcomer of Indian politics AAP formed the government with support of the INC.
  - BJP wins a four-fifths majority in an election to state assembly of Rajasthan. Vasundhara Raje is sworn in as Chief Minister.
  - BJP wins a third consecutive election in Madhya Pradesh. Shivraj Singh Chouhan is sworn in as Chief Minister.
  - BJP wins a third consecutive an election in Chhattisgarh. Raman Singh is sworn in as Chief Minister.
  - INC leader Pu Lalthanhawla is sworn in as Chief Minister of Mizoram in an election.

== Electoral Events ==
- 5 March : The Election Commission of India announce election scheduled to the 16th Lok Sabha.
- 5 March: the Model code of conduct comes into force.
- 14 March: Issue of notification for the first poll day.
- 15 March: Issue of notification for the second and third poll days.
- 19 March: Issue of notification for the fourth and fifth poll days.
- 21 March: Last date for filing nominations for the first poll day.
- 21 March: Last date for filing nominations for the second and third poll days.
- 21 March: Last date for filing nominations for the fourth and fifth poll days.
- 29 March: Issue of notification for the sixth poll day.
- 2 April: Issue of notification for the seventh poll day.
- 5 April: Last date for filing nominations for the sixth poll day.
- 7 April: Polling held at 6 parliamentary constituencies spanning over 2 states for the first poll day.
- 7 April: the BJP release its election manifesto.
- 9 April: Last date for filing nominations for the seventh poll day.
- 9 April: Polling held at 7 parliamentary constituencies spanning over 5 states for the second poll day.
- 10 April: Polling held at 92 parliamentary constituencies spanning over 14 states for the third poll day.
- 12 April: Issue of notification for the penultimate eighth poll day.
- 12 April: Polling held at 5 parliamentary constituencies spanning over 3 states for the fourth poll day.
- 17 April: Issue of notification for the last and ultimate ninth poll day.
- 17 April: Polling held at 122 parliamentary constituencies spanning over 13 states for the fifth poll day.
- 19 April: Last date for filing nominations for the eighth poll day.
- 24 April: Last date for filing nominations for the ninth poll day.
- 24 April: Polling held at 117 parliamentary constituencies spanning over 12 states for the sixth poll day.
- 30 April: Polling held at 89 parliamentary constituencies spanning over 9 states for the seventh poll day.
- 7 May: Polling held at 64 parliamentary constituencies spanning over 7 states for the eighth poll day.
- 12 May: Polling held at 41 parliamentary constituencies spanning over 3 states for the ninth poll day.
- 16 May: Counting of votes and declaration of results for all poll days of the election.

== Government Formation ==
- 17 May: Incumbent PM Manmohan Singh is due to resign after a decade long of service.
- 26 May: Elected PM Narendra Modi gets sworn as the Prime Minister of India.
