= Gopal Singh Rawat (politician) =

Indian politician (1960–2021)

Member of Uttarakhand Legislative Assembly
- In office 15 February 2017 – 23 April 2021
- Preceded by: Vijaypal Singh Sajwan
- Succeeded by: Suresh Singh Chauhan
- Constituency: Gangotri
- In office 2007–2012
- Preceded by: Vijaypal Singh Sajwan
- Succeeded by: Vijaypal Singh Sajwan
- Constituency: Gangotri

Personal details
- Died: 23 April 2021 Dehradun
- Party: Bharatiya Janata Party
- Education: M.Com.
- Alma mater: Hemwati Nandan Bahuguna Garhwal University
- Profession: Social worker

Gopal Singh Rawat (22 February 1960 - 23 April 2021) was an Indian politician from Bharatiya Janata Party. Rawat was elected as a member of the Uttarakhand Legislative Assembly from Gangotri (constituency) in 2007 and 2017.

== Early life and education ==
Rawat was from Gangotri, Uttarkashi, Uttarakhand. He was the son of late Kundan Singh Rawat. He was a post graduate. He did M.Com. at Garhwal University, Rajkiya Snatkottar Mahavidhyalaya, Uttarkasi.

== Career ==
Rawat won the 2017 Uttarakhand Legislative Assembly election representing BJP and defeated his nearest rival, Vijaypal Singh Sajwan of Indian National Congress by 9,610 votes. Earlier, he became an MLA for the first time winning the 2007 Uttarakhand Legislative Assembly election.

== Death ==
Rawat died from Cancer aged 60.
