= 2012 elections in India =

Elections in India
- 2012

The elections in 2012 were scheduled for seven Vidhan Sabhas and several local elections were also conducted. The 14th presidential election to elect the 13th president of the republic was also held in 2012. The tenure of the legislative assemblies of Goa, Gujarat, Himachal Pradesh, Manipur, Punjab, Uttar Pradesh and Uttarakhand were to expire during the year. The Election Commission of India issued the dates for the elections in Manipur, Punjab, Uttarakhand, Uttar Pradesh and Goa to take place in the first quarter of the year. Whereas the elections were held in Himachal Pradesh and Gujarat in the last quarter of the year.

In the first rounds of elections, Manipur and Punjab resulted in an incumbent government victory; while in Uttar Pradesh and Goa there was a heavy anti-incumbent victory; and Uttarakhand resulted in a hung assembly with an anti-incumbent plurality and in the second round, in Himachal Pradesh, BJP led by incumbent Chief Minister Prem Kumar Dhumal lost due to a huge anti-incumbency wave arising mainly out of corruption and lack of good governance. Congress veteran leader Virbhadra Singh took oath for record sixth term as next Chief Minister. In the western state of Gujarat incumbent Chief Minister Narendra Modi, in power since 2002, was running for his fourth term. Elections, held in two phases, reverted Bharatiya Janata Party (BJP), in power in Gujarat since 1995, with 119 seat out of 182.

== Presidential election ==
Date	President before election	Party before election	Elected President	Party after election
18 July 2022	Pratibha Patil	Indian National Congress	Pranab Mukherjee	Indian National Congress

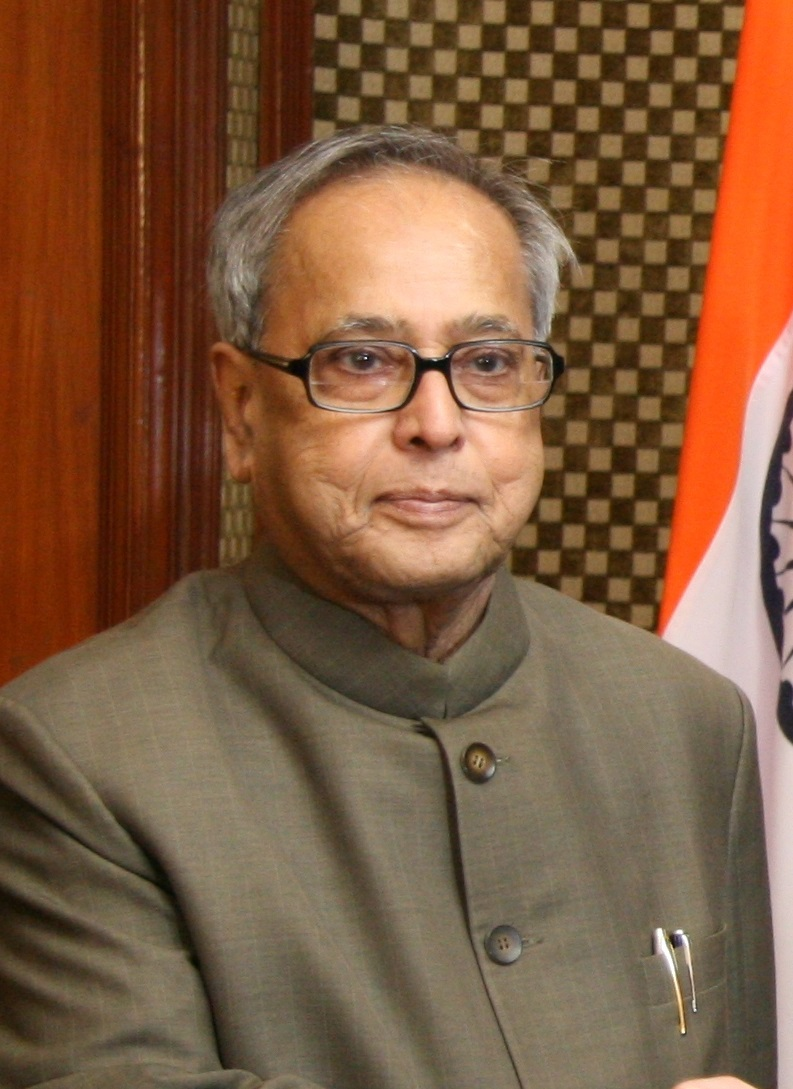
Pranab Mukherjee

The 14th indirect presidential election, in order to elect the 13th president, was held in India on 19 July 2012. On 22 July, Pranab Mukherjee was declared the winner. Mukheree gained 373,116 MP votes and 340,647 MLA votes for a total of 713,763 votes to win the election. He defeated P. A. Sangma, who got 145,848 MP votes and 170,139 MLA votes for a total of 315,987 votes. Mukherjee's win was aided by cross-voting.

== Vice Presidential Election ==
Date	Vice-President before election	Party before election	Elected Vice-President	Party after election
18 July 2022	Mohammad Hamid Ansari	Indian National Congress	Mohammad Hamid Ansari	Indian National Congress

== Legislative Assembly elections ==
Date(s)	State	Government before election	Chief Minister before election	Government after election	Chief Minister after election	Maps
28 January 2012	Manipur	Indian National Congress	Okram Ibobi Singh	Indian National Congress	Okram Ibobi Singh	
28 January 2012	Manipur	Communist Party of India	Okram Ibobi Singh	Indian National Congress	Okram Ibobi Singh	
28 January 2012	Manipur	Manipur Peoples Party	Okram Ibobi Singh	Indian National Congress	Okram Ibobi Singh	
28 January 2012	Manipur	Nationalist Congress Party	Okram Ibobi Singh	Indian National Congress	Okram Ibobi Singh	
30 January 2012	Punjab	Shiromani Akali Dal	Parkash Singh Badal	Shiromani Akali Dal	Parkash Singh Badal	
30 January 2012	Punjab	Bharatiya Janata Party	Parkash Singh Badal	Bharatiya Janata Party	Parkash Singh Badal	
30 January 2012	Uttarakhand	Bharatiya Janata Party	B.C. Khanduri	Indian National Congress	Vijay Bahuguna	
30 January 2012	Uttarakhand	Bharatiya Janata Party	B.C. Khanduri	Bahujan Samaj Party	Vijay Bahuguna	
30 January 2012	Uttarakhand	Uttarakhand Kranti Dal	B.C. Khanduri	Uttarakhand Kranti Dal	Vijay Bahuguna	
8 February 2012 – 3 March 2012	Uttar Pradesh	Bahujan Samaj Party	Mayawati	Samajwadi Party	Akhilesh Yadav	
3 March 2012	Goa	Indian National Congress	Digambar Kamat	Bharatiya Janata Party	Manohar Parrikar	
4 November 2012	Himachal Pradesh	Bharatiya Janata Party	Prem Kumar Dhumal	Indian National Congress	Virbhadra Singh	
13 and 17 December 2012	Gujarat	Bharatiya Janata Party	Narendra Modi	Bharatiya Janata Party	Narendra Modi	

== Parliamentary By-election ==
S.No	Date	Constituency	State	MP before election	Party before election	Elected MP	Party after election
15	18 March 2012	Udupi Chikmagalur	Karnataka	Sadananda Gowda	Bharatiya Janata Party	Jayaprakash Hegde	Indian National Congress
39	9 June 2012	Kannauj	Uttar Pradesh	Akhilesh Yadav	Samajwadi Party	Dimple Yadav	Samajwadi Party
39	12 June 2012	Nellore	Andhra Pradesh	Mekapati Rajamohan Reddy	Indian National Congress	Mekapati Rajamohan Reddy	YSR Congress Party
1	10 October 2012	Tehri Garhwal	Uttarakhand	Vijay Bahuguna	Indian National Congress	Mala Rajya Laxmi Shah	Bharatiya Janata Party
9	10 October 2012	Jangipur	West Bengal	Pranab Mukherjee	Indian National Congress	Abhijit Mukherjee	Indian National Congress

== Assembly By-elections ==
=== Andhra Pradesh ===
S.No	Date	Constituency	MLA before election	Party before election	Elected MLA	Party after election
7	10 March 2012	Adilabad	Jogu Ramanna	Telugu Desam Party	Jogu Ramanna	Telangana Rashtra Samithi
16	18 March 2012	Kamareddy	Gampa Govardhan	Telugu Desam Party	Gampa Govardhan	Telangana Rashtra Samithi
74	18 March 2012	Mahbubnagar	N. Rajeshwar Reddy	Independent	Yennam Srinivas Reddy	Bharatiya Janata Party
81	18 March 2012	Nagarkurnool	Nagam Janardhan Reddy	Telugu Desam Party	Nagam Janardhan Reddy	Independent
85	18 March 2012	Kollapur	Jupally Krishna Rao	Indian National Congress	Jupally Krishna Rao	Telangana Rashtra Samithi
99	18 March 2012	Ghanpur Station	T. Rajaiah	Indian National Congress	T. Rajaiah	Telangana Rashtra Samithi
235	18 March 2012	Kovur	Nallapareddy Prasanna Kumar Reddy	Telugu Desam Party	Nallapareddy Prasanna Kumar Reddy	YSR Congress Party
104	12 June 2012	Parkal	Konda Surekha	Indian National Congress	M. Bikshpathi	Telangana Rashtra Samithi
127	12 June 2012	Narasannapeta	Dharmana Krishna Das	Indian National Congress	Dharmana Krishna Das	YSR Congress Party
152	12 June 2012	Payakaraopet	Golla Baburao	Indian National Congress	Golla Baburao	YSR Congress Party
161	12 June 2012	Ramachandrapuram	Pilli Subhash Chandra Bose	Indian National Congress	Thota Trimurthulu	Indian National Congress
177	12 June 2012	Narasapuram	Mudnuri Prasad Raju	Indian National Congress	Kothapalli Subbarayudu	Indian National Congress
186	12 June 2012	Polavaram	Tellam Balaraju	Indian National Congress	Tellam Balaraju	YSR Congress Party
212	12 June 2012	Prathipadu	Mekathoti Sucharitha	Indian National Congress	Mekathoti Sucharitha	YSR Congress Party
220	12 June 2012	Macherla	Pinnelli Ramakrishna Reddy	Indian National Congress	Pinnelli Ramakrishna Reddy	YSR Congress Party
227	12 June 2012	Ongole	Balineni Srinivasa Reddy	Indian National Congress	Balineni Srinivasa Reddy	YSR Congress Party
242	12 June 2012	Udayagiri	Mekapati Chandrasekhar Reddy	Indian National Congress	Mekapati Chandrasekhar Reddy	YSR Congress Party
244	12 June 2012	Rajampet	Akepati Amaranath Reddy	Indian National Congress	Akepati Amaranath Reddy	YSR Congress Party
246	12 June 2012	Kodur	Koramutla Srinivasulu	Indian National Congress	Koramutla Srinivasulu	YSR Congress Party
247	12 June 2012	Rayachoti	Gadikota Srikanth Reddy	Indian National Congress	Gadikota Srikanth Reddy	YSR Congress Party
253	12 June 2012	Allagadda	Shobha Nagi Reddy	Praja Rajyam Party	Shobha Nagi Reddy	YSR Congress Party
263	12 June 2012	Yemmiganur	K. Chennakesava Reddy	Indian National Congress	K. Chennakesava Reddy	YSR Congress Party
267	12 June 2012	Rayadurg	Kapu Ramachandra Reddy	Indian National Congress	Kapu Ramachandra Reddy	YSR Congress Party
272	12 June 2012	Anantapur Urban	Bodimalla Gurunatha Reddy	Indian National Congress	Bodimalla Gurunatha Reddy	YSR Congress Party
286	12 June 2012	Tirupati	Konidela Chiranjeevi	Praja Rajyam Party	Bhumana Karunakar Reddy	YSR Congress Party

=== Goa ===
S.No	Date	Constituency	MLA before election	Party before election	Elected MLA	Party after election
27	21 May 2012	Cortalim	José Matanhy de Saldanha	Bharatiya Janata Party	Alina Saldanha	Bharatiya Janata Party

=== Gujarat ===
S.No	Date	Constituency	MLA before election	Party before election	Elected MLA	Party after election
85	18 March 2012	Mansa	Mangalbhai Patel	Bharatiya Janata Party	Babusinhj Thakor	Indian National Congress

=== Jharkhand ===
S.No	Date	Constituency	MLA before election	Party before election	Elected MLA	Party after election
64	12 June 2012	Hatia	Gopal Sharan Nath Shahdeo	Indian National Congress	Navin Jaiswal	All Jharkhand Students Union

=== Kerala ===
S.No	Date	Constituency	MLA before election	Party before election	Elected MLA	Party after election
85	17 March 2012	Piravom	T. M. Jacob	Kerala Congress (Jacob)	Anoop Jacob	Kerala Congress (Jacob)
140	2 June 2012	Neyyattinkara	R. Selvaraj	Communist Party of India (Marxist)	R. Selvaraj	Indian National Congress

=== Madhya Pradesh ===
S.No	Date	Constituency	MLA before election	Party before election	Elected MLA	Party after election
183	12 June 2012	Maheshwar	Vijayalaxmi Sadho	Indian National Congress	Rajkumar Mev	Bharatiya Janata Party

=== Maharashtra ===
S.No	Date	Constituency	MLA before election	Party before election	Elected MLA	Party after election
232	12 June 2012	Kaij	Vimal Mundada	Nationalist Congress Party	Prithviraj Sathe	Nationalist Congress Party

=== Odisha ===
S.No	Date	Constituency	MLA before election	Party before election	Elected MLA	Party after election
89	18 March 2012	Athagarh	Ramesh Rout	Independent	Ranendra Pratap Swain	Biju Janata Dal

=== Punjab ===
S.No	Date	Constituency	MLA before election	Party before election	Elected MLA	Party after election
40	11 July 2012	Athagarh	Amarjit Singh Sahi	Bharatiya Janata Party	Sukhjit Kaur Sahi	Bharatiya Janata Party

=== Tamil Nadu ===
S.No	Date	Constituency	MLA before election	Party before election	Elected MLA	Party after election
219	18 March 2012	Sankarankoil	C. Karuppasamy	All India Anna Dravida Munnetra Kazhagam	V. M. Rajalakshmi	All India Anna Dravida Munnetra Kazhagam
180	12 June 2012	Sankarankoil	S. P. Muthukumaran	Communist Party of India	V. R. Karthik Thondaiman	All India Anna Dravida Munnetra Kazhagam

=== Tripura ===
S.No	Date	Constituency	MLA before election	Party before election	Elected MLA	Party after election
20	12 June 2012	Nalchar	Sukumar Barman	Communist Party of India	Tapan Chandra Das	Communist Party of India

=== Uttar Pradesh ===
S.No	Date	Constituency	MLA before election	Party before election	Elected MLA	Party after election
82	12 June 2012	Mant	Jayant Chaudhary	Rashtriya Lok Dal	Shyam Sunder Sharma	All India Trinamool Congress

=== Uttarakhand ===
S.No	Date	Constituency	MLA before election	Party before election	Elected MLA	Party after election
68	8 July 2012	Sitarganj	Kiran Mandal	Bharatiya Janata Party	Vijay Bahuguna	Indian National Congress

=== West Bengal ===
S.No	Date	Constituency	MLA before election	Party before election	Elected MLA	Party after election
230	12 June 2012	Daspur	Ajit Bhunia	All India Trinamool Congress	Mamata Bhunia	All India Trinamool Congress
252	12 June 2012	Bankura	Kashinath Misra	All India Trinamool Congress	Minati Misra	All India Trinamool Congress

== Local elections ==
Municipal elections were held in various cities across Maharashtra on 16 February. In different cities elections results were mixed by party. The capital, Mumbai, resulted in a plurality for the Shiv Sena and the second largest city of Pune resulted in a Nationalist Congress Party plurality.

== See also ==
- Elections in Uttar Pradesh
- S. Y. Quraishi
- V. S. Sampath
