= Deshraj Karnwal =

Indian politician (born 1969)

Deshraj Karanwal

Member of the Uttarakhand Legislative Assembly
- In office 2017–2022
- Preceded by: Hari Das
- Succeeded by: Virender Kumar Jati
- Constituency: Jhabrera

Personal details
- Born: 1 August 1968 (age 58) Roorkee, Uttar Pradesh, India (present-day Uttarakhand, India)
- Party: Bharatiya Janata Party
- Spouse: Vijeyantimala Karnwal
- Parent: Jagdish Prasad
- Occupation: Politician

Deshraj Karanwal is an Indian politician. He was a member of the 4th Uttarakhand Assembly from Jhabrera as a member of the Bharatiya Janata Party. He contested Legislative Assembly election from Jhabrera, in 2017 and won. He is associated with the Bhartiya Janta Party.

== Early life and education ==
Deshraj Karanwal was born in Roorkee, Haridwar in 1969. He belongs to Dalit Caste and his wife Vijeyantimala is a schoolteacher. As per his election affidavit, Karanwal is graduated. Prior to entering politics, he was a Ration Dealer, Property Agent by profession.

== Controversy ==
Deshraj Karnwal had given a controversial statement regarding the violence in Delhi on 26 January 2021. While on one hand he had condemned the Delhi violence, on the other hand he had given a controversial statement. The media asked him questions about the farmers' movement and Delhi violence, he blamed the opposition for it. At the same time, he said angrily that the farmers do not want a solution. Deshraj Karnwal had accused the leader of his own party, Kunwar Pranav Singh Champion, of endangering the life of his family. Both made verbal attacks for several days. Later both reconciled.

Then MLA Deshraj Karnwal had reached Bhagtowali village of Jhabreda police station area, to get information regarding development works. During this, he was taking information from the villagers about the development works. Meanwhile, some villagers had started abusing him. Also indecent words were used. A villager had made a video of it and put it on social media, which went viral on sight. A complaint was lodged at the Jhabreda Police Station on behalf of the MLA's private secretary Jitendra.

== Requested ECI postpone election ==
Bharatiya Janata Party's Jhabreda MLA Deshraj Karnwal had written a letter to the Election Commission demanding change in the date of elections in Uttarakhand. He said that since February 14 is Guru Ravidas Jayanti, the date of election should be changed in the state also on the lines of Punjab. MLA Deshraj Karnwal told that he has submitted a letter in this regard to the officials of the Election Commission of India in Delhi. But Election Commission of India did not consider his request letter and Election was held on 14 February as decided on schedule.
