= Kamala Bahuguna =

Indian politician

Member of parliament, Lok Sabha
- In office 1977–1980
- Preceded by: V. P. Singh
- Succeeded by: B. D. Singh
- Constituency: Phulpur, Uttar Pradesh

Personal details
- Born: 30 December 1923 Allahabad, United Provinces, British India (present-day Uttar Pradesh, India)
- Died: 7 November 2001 (aged 77) New Delhi, India
- Party: Janata Party
- Other political affiliations: Indian National Congress
- Spouse: Hemvati Nandan Bahuguna
- Children: Two son and a daughter

Kamala Bahuguna (30 December 1923 – 7 November 2001) was an Indian politician. She was elected to the Lok Sabha, lower house of the Parliament of India, from Phulpur, Uttar Pradesh as member of the Janata Party in 1977.

She was the second wife of Hemvati Nandan Bahuguna and lived with him in Allahabad and was the mother of their 3 children:

- Their first son Vijay Bahuguna was the Chief Minister of Uttarakhand. He was a former judge of Allahabad High Court and Bombay High Court. Currently he is a member of Bharatiya Janata Party
- Second son Shekhar Bahuguna.
- Daughter Rita Bahuguna Joshi is also in politics and was UP Congress Chief. She was also Mayor of Allahabad. Currently she is member of Bharatiya Janata Party and former minister in Yogi cabinet.
