= Joga Ram Tamta =

Indian politician

Member of Uttarakhand Legislative Assembly
- In office 2007–2012
- Preceded by: Narayan Ram Arya
- Succeeded by: Narayan Ram Arya
- Constituency: Gangolihaat

Personal details
- Born: Pithoragarh, Uttarakhand
- Education: L.L.B and B.A. from Kumaun University

Joga Ram Tamta (?-unknown) was an Indian politician who served as the member of legislative assembly from Gangolihat Assembly constituency in the Indian state of Uttarakhand from 2007 till 2012.

== Education ==
He was graduate and had a degree of BA and LLB.

== Political career ==
Tamta contested from Gangolihat Assembly constituency as a BJP candidate in 2002 but lost to Narayan Ram Arya from Indian National Congress by a margin of 470 votes. He contested again in 2007 and won this time, defeating his closest rival Narayan Ram Arya by 2,790 votes.
