= Chandra Shekhar (Uttarakhand politician) =

Indian politician (1941–2024)

Member of the Uttarakhand Legislative Assembly
- In office 2012–2017
- Preceded by: Constituency established
- Succeeded by: Suresh Rathor
- Constituency: Jwalapur
- In office 2002–2007
- Preceded by: Constituency established
- Succeeded by: Surendra Rakesh
- Constituency: Bhagwanpur

Personal details
- Born: c. 1941
- Died: 21 November 2024 (aged 83) Delhi, India
- Party: Bharatiya Janata Party
- Occupation: Politician

Chandra Shekhar (c.1941- 21 November 2024) was an Indian politician and member of the Bharatiya Janata Party. Shekhar was a member of the Uttarakhand Legislative Assembly from the Jwalapur constituency in Haridwar district from 2012 till 2017. Shekhar was also a member of the Uttarakhand Legislative Assembly from Bhagwanpur Assembly constituency in Haridwar district which he represented from 2002 till 2007.

He won from Bhagwanpur Assembly constituency in the 2002 election but lost from that seat in the 2007 election and later shifted to the newly created Jwalapur Assembly constituency, from which he won in 2012.

Shekhar died on 21 November 2024 in Delhi from a brain haemorrhage, aged 83.
