= Narayan Ram Arya =

Indian politician (born 1952)

Member of Uttarakhand Legislative Assembly
- In office 2012–2017
- Preceded by: Joga Ram Tamta
- Succeeded by: Meena Gangola
- Constituency: Gangolihaat
- In office 2002–2007
- Preceded by: Constituency established
- Succeeded by: Joga Ram Tamta
- Constituency: Gangolihaat

Personal details
- Born: 7 September 1952 (age 73) Gangolihat, Pithoragarh, Uttarakhand, India
- Party: Bharatiya Janata Party (since 2022)
- Other political affiliations: Indian National Congress (until 2022)
- Education: M.A. and B.Ed from Kumaun University

Narayan Ram Arya (born 7 September 1952) is an Indian politician. Arya was a member of the Uttarakhand Legislative Assembly from Gangolihat Assembly constituency in Pithoragarh district from 2002 to 2007 and again from 2012 till 2017 as a member of the Indian National Congress. He also served as a cabinet minister rank official in the state government during the tenure of N.D. Tiwari and Harish Rawat.

== Education ==
He is a post graduate and has a degree of M.A and B.Ed which he attained from the Kumaun University in 1982.

== Political career ==
Arya first entered the Uttarakhand Legislative Assembly in 2002, winning the Gangolihat Assembly constituency as an Indian National Congress candidate by defeating BJP's Joga Ram Tamta with a margin of 470 votes. During his tenure, he served as a cabinet minister-rank official in the government led by Chief Minister N.D. Tiwari.

In the 2007 assembly elections, Arya lost to BJP candidate Joga Ram Tamta by 2,790 votes. He regained the seat in 2012, defeating BJP's Geeta Thakur by 7,880 votes and was again appointed as a cabinet minister level official in the Congress government. However, in the 2017 elections, he lost to BJP's Meena Gangola by a narrow margin of 805 votes. His defeat in 2017 was widely attributed to the independent candidate Khajan Chandra Guddu (who would go on to be the Congress candidate in 2022) who had secured 10,763 votes. In 2022, he left the Congress after being denied a ticket and decided to contest as an independent candidate from Gangolihaat but he later withdrew his candidature and joined the Bharatiya Janata Party.

== Electoral performance ==
2017 Uttarakhand Legislative Assembly election: Gangolihat
Party	Candidate	Votes	%	±%
BJP	Meena Gangola	20,418	37.06%	▲2.74
INC	Narayan Ram Arya	19,613	35.60%	▼14.86
Independent	Khajan Chandra Guddu	10,763	19.54%	New
BSD	Dinesh Kumar	958	1.74%	New
NOTA	None of the above	865	1.57%	New
Independent	Sumitra Devi	841	1.53%	New
BSP	Deepak Kumar	668	1.21%	▼5.17
UKD	Harish Prashad	550	1.00%	▼2.23
Margin of victory		805	1.46%	▼14.67
Turnout		55,092	54.92%	▼0.55
Registered electors		1,00,315		▲13.90
BJP gain from INC		Swing	▼13.40	

2012 Uttarakhand Legislative Assembly election: Gangolihat
Party	Candidate	Votes	%	±%
INC	Narayan Ram Arya	24,648	50.46%	▲16.04
BJP	Geeta Thakur Gowal	16,768	34.33%	▼8.12
BSP	Narayan Ram Sanguri	3,120	6.39%	▲0.49
UKD	Dinesh Arya	1,576	3.23%	▼0.38
Independent	Harish Prashad	1,186	2.43%	New
LJP	Jyoti Rani	788	1.61%	▼0.89
URM	Bachi Ram Koli	493	1.01%	New
Margin of victory		7,880	16.13%	▲8.11
Turnout		48,849	55.46%	▲0.70
Registered electors		88,073		▲38.76
INC gain from BJP		Swing	▲8.01	

2007 Uttarakhand Legislative Assembly election: Gangolihat
Party	Candidate	Votes	%	±%
BJP	Joga Ram Tamta	14,755	42.45%	▲10.49
INC	Narayan Ram Arya	11,965	34.42%	▲0.68
Independent	Fakeer Ram	3,089	8.89%	New
BSP	Anuli	2,050	5.90%	▲1.51
UKD	Dhaniram	1,253	3.60%	▼2.13
LJP	Raj Kumar	870	2.50%	New
Vishwa Vikas Sangh	Ashok Kumar	779	2.24%	New
Margin of victory		2,790	8.03%	▲6.24
Turnout		34,761	54.77%	▲6.32
Registered electors		63,472		▲16.59
BJP gain from INC		Swing	▲8.71	

2002 Uttaranchal Legislative Assembly election: Gangolihat
Party	Candidate	Votes	%	±%
INC	Narayan Ram Arya	8,898	33.74%	New
BJP	Joga Ram Tamta	8,428	31.96%	New
Independent	Geeta Thakur Gowal	3,286	12.46%	New
Independent	Harish Prashad	2,501	9.48%	New
UKD	Hari Ram Agari	1,513	5.74%	New
BSP	Sunder Ram	1,158	4.39%	New
SP	Narayan Ram	590	2.24%	New
Margin of victory		470	1.78%	
Turnout		26,374	48.48%	
Registered electors		54,441		
INC win (new seat)				
