= Virendra Kumar (Uttarakhand politician) =

Indian politician

Virendra Kumar (Jaati)

Member of the Uttarakhand Legislative Assembly
- Incumbent
- Assumed office 10 March 2022
- Preceded by: Deshraj Karnwal
- Constituency: Jhabrera

Personal details
- Party: Indian National Congress
- Profession: Politician

Virendra Kumar (Jaati) is an Indian politician and the MLA from Jhabrera Assembly constituency. He is a member of the Indian National Congress.

Virendra Kumar Jaati defeated Rajpal Singh of Bhartiya Janata Party in 2022 Uttarakhand Legislative Assembly election.
