= Rita Bahuguna Joshi =

Indian politician and Member of Parliament

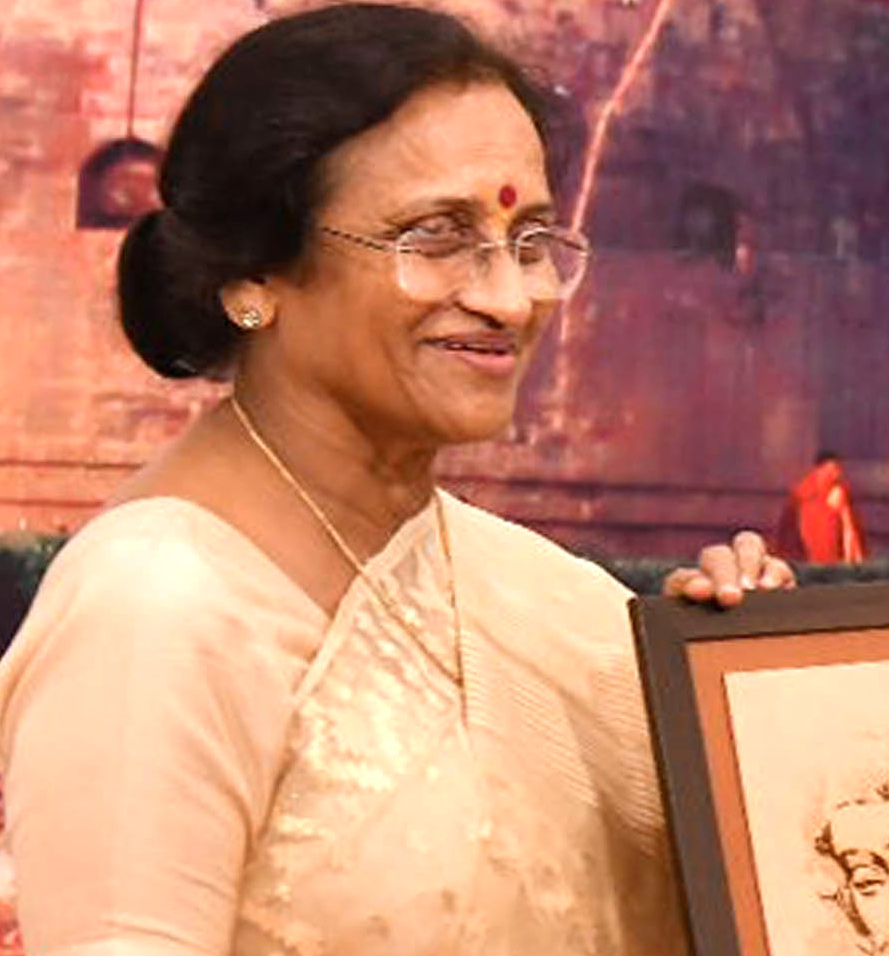

Member of Parliament, Lok Sabha
- In office 23 May 2019 – 4 June 2024
- Preceded by: Shyama Charan Gupta
- Succeeded by: Ujjwal Raman Singh
- Constituency: Allahabad

Minister of Women Welfare, Family Welfare, Maternity and Child Welfare and Tourism Government of Uttar Pradesh
- In office 16 May 2017 – 23 May 2019

Member of Legislative Assembly, Uttar Pradesh
- In office 7 March 2012 – 23 May 2019
- Preceded by: Suresh Chandra Tiwari
- Succeeded by: Suresh Chandra Tiwari
- Constituency: Lucknow Cantt.

President of Uttar Pradesh Congress Committee
- In office 12 September 2007 – 29 August 2012
- Preceded by: Salman Khurshid
- Succeeded by: Nirmal Khatri

Personal details
- Born: 22 July 1949 (age 77) Allahabad, United Provinces, India
- Party: Bharatiya Janata Party (2016–Present)
- Other political affiliations: Indian National Congress (1992-2016)
- Spouse: Puran Chandra Joshi (m. 1976)
- Relations: Hemwati Nandan Bahuguna (Father); Kamala Bahuguna (Mother); Vijay Bahuguna (Brother)
- Children: Mayank Joshi
- Website: ritabjoshi.in

Rita Bahuguna Joshi (born 22 July 1949) is an Indian politician and a former cabinet minister in the Government of Uttar Pradesh. She was the president of the Uttar Pradesh Congress Committee from 2007 to 2012. She is the daughter of Hemwati Nandan Bahuguna, a former chief minister of the Indian state of Uttar Pradesh. She joined Bharatiya Janata Party (BJP) on 20 October 2016. She was elected to the Lok Sabha, lower house of the Parliament of India from Allahabad, Uttar Pradesh in the 2019 Indian general election as a BJP member.

== Early life ==
Rita Bahuguna Joshi is daughter of Late H. N. Bahuguna, former Chief Minister of U.P. Her mother, Late Kamla Bahuguna, was an ex-MP. She holds an MA and a PhD in History and is a professor in Medieval and Modern History at the University of Allahabad. She is also a recipient of a United Nations Award of Excellence as being among the "Most Distinguished Women Mayor in South Asia". She authored two history books before joining the Indian National Congress.

== Political career ==
Rita Bahuguna held the post of mayor of Allahabad from 1995 to 2000. She is a former vice-president of the National Council of Women, has been president of the All India Mahila Congress since 2003 and of the Uttar Pradesh Congress Committee since September 2007. She has twice contested unsuccessfully in elections to the Lok Sabha. the lower house of the Parliament of India. She was elected a Member of the Legislative Assembly for the Lucknow Cantonment in the 2012 state elections.. She contested the 2014 Lok Sabha elections from Lucknow and lost.

She joined BJP on 20-Oct-2016 in presence of BJP president Amit Shah after spending 24 years in Congress.

== Arrest ==
On 16 July 2009, she was detained for allegedly making derogatory remarks about Uttar Pradesh Chief Minister Mayawati. She was later sent to the Moradabad jail on 14 days' judicial custody.

Joshi's speech was about the law and order situation in Uttar Pradesh and the increasing number of rapes in the state. She cited a few cases in which some women were paid 25,000 rupees compensation after being raped. She remarked that simply compensating the women with money was not enough. Women who are raped should "throw the money at Mayawati's face and tell her 'you should also be raped and I will give you 10 million rupees" she said in the speech.

She was one of the party leaders arrested by the Meerut range police on 11 May 2011 from the Bhatta Parsaul village of western Uttar Pradesh along with the fellow leaders Rahul Gandhi and Digvijay Singh. They were taking part in an agitation staged by the local farmers condemning the state government policies. A top police officer of the range confirmed their detention to the media adding that they were about to produce the trio to a local court on the following working day.

== Personal life ==
Rita Bahuguna Joshi is married to P C Joshi, a mechanical engineer from Patrice Lumumba University and has a son, Mayank Joshi. She has two brothers Vijay Bahuguna was the Chief Minister of Uttarakhand and Shekhar Bahuguna who had contested 2012 assembly election but could not succeed from Phaphamau constituency in Allahabad, U.P.

Mrs. Rita Bahuguna has worked in the favour of Indian women as the President of All India Mahila Congress from 2003 to 2008. She was involved in Women's Movement at the Grass-root level and organized several seminars, demonstrations etc. for women. She actively led the Movement for Reservation for Women in Local Bodies in U.P. in 1991–92. In her struggles to fight the injustices against women, she was jailed in 2009 for protesting against increased incidents of rape on women in U.P. Her efforts to relieve the plight of women in U.P. got her awarded the U.N. Award of Excellence as "Most Distinguished Women Mayor in South Asia" at Phitsanulok, Thailand in June in 2001.

Rita Bahuguna Joshi suffered a personal tragedy, during the Diwali festival, of 2020, when her six-year-old granddaughter, Kiya Joshi, daughter of her son Mayank, died in Prayagraj, after sustaining burns while playing with diyas.
