= Suresh Singh Chauhan =

Indian politician

Suresh Singh Chauhan (born 1968) is an Indian politician from Uttarakhand. He is a member of the Uttarakhand Legislative Assembly from Gangotri Assembly constituency in Uttarkashi district. He won the 2022 Uttarakhand Legislative Assembly election representing the Bhratiya Janata Party.

== Early life and education ==
Chauhan is from Gangotri, Uttarkashi district, Uttarakhand. He is the son of Prem Singh Chauhan. He completed his Class 12 in 1994 and later discontinued his studies.

== Career ==
Chauhan won from Gangotri Assembly constituency representing the Bharatiya Janata Party in the 2022 Uttarakhand Legislative Assembly election. He polled 29,619 votes and defeated his nearest rival, Vijaypal Singh Sajwan of the Indian National Congress, by a margin of 8, 029 votes. In August 2024, after heavy rains and resultant landslides, he approached the chief minister, who directed the Disaster Management secretary and other officials to assess the damage and arrange for distribution of compensation.
