= Saurabh Bahuguna =

Indian politician

Member of Legislative Assembly for Sitarganj
- Incumbent
- Assumed office 11 March 2017
- Preceded by: Vijay Bahuguna

Personal details
- Born: 13 November 1978 (age 47)
- Party: Bharatiya Janata Party

Saurabh Bahuguna (11 March 1978 ) is an Indian politician from Uttarakhand and a Member of the Uttarakhand Legislative Assembly. He is serving as the Minister of Animal Husbandry, Fisheries, Skill development & Employment, Protocol and Sugarcane Development in Pushkar Singh Dhami's cabinet of 2022. He represents the Sitarganj (Uttarakhand Assembly constituency). Saurabh is a member of the Bharatiya Janata Party. He is the youngest son of former Chief Minister of Uttarakhand Vijay Bahuguna and grandson of former Chief Minister of Uttar Pradesh Hemwati Nandan Bahuguna.

== Positions held ==
| Year | Description |
|---|---|
| 2017 - 2022 | Elected to 4th Uttarakhand Assembly: Member - Committee on Ethics (2017–18) |
| 2022 - Till Date | Elected to 5th Uttarakhand Assembly: Cabinet Minister |

== Electoral performance ==
| Election | Constituency | Party | Result | Votes % | Opposition Candidate | Opposition Party | Opposition vote % | Ref |
|---|---|---|---|---|---|---|---|---|
| 2022 | Sitarganj | BJP | Won | 44.81% | Navtej Pal Singh | INC | 33.50% | |
| 2017 | Sitarganj | BJP | Won | 57.81% | Malti Biswas | INC | 25.31% | |
