= Pratapnagar Assembly constituency =

Constituency of the Uttarakhand legislative assembly in India

Coordinates: 30.51°N 78.50°E

Pratapnagar
- Constituency No. 12 for the Uttarakhand Legislative Assembly

Constituency details
- Country: India
- Region: North India
- State: Uttarakhand
- District: Tehri Garhwal
- Lok Sabha constituency: Tehri Garhwal
- Total electors: 85,229
- Reservation: None

Member of Legislative Assembly
- 5th Uttarakhand Legislative Assembly
- Incumbent Vikram Singh Negi
- Party: Indian National Congress
- Elected year: 2022

Pratapnagar Legislative Assembly constituency is one of the 70 assembly constituencies of Uttarakhand a northern state of India. Pratapnagar is part of Tehri Garhwal Lok Sabha constituency. Pratapnagar tehsil is included in this constituency.

== Members of the Legislative Assembly ==
Election	Member	Party
2002	Phool Singh	Indian National Congress
2007	Vijay Singh Panwar	Bharatiya Janata Party
2012	Vikram Singh Negi	Indian National Congress
2017	Vijay Singh Panwar	Bharatiya Janata Party
2022	Vikram Singh Negi	Indian National Congress

== Election results ==
=== 2027 Assembly election ===
2027 Uttarakhand Legislative Assembly election: Pratapnagar
Party	Candidate	Votes	%	±%
INC				
BJP				
NOTA	None of the above			
Majority				
Turnout				
gain from		Swing		

=== Assembly Election 2022 ===
2022 Uttarakhand Legislative Assembly election: Pratapnagar
Party	Candidate	Votes	%	±%
INC	Vikram Singh Negi	19,131	44.67%	▲12.94
BJP	Vijay Singh Panwar	16,790	39.21%	▲2.78
Independent	Pankaj Vyas	4,842	11.31%	New
AAP	Sagar Singh Bhandari	895	2.09%	New
NOTA	None of the above	691	1.61%	▲0.27
Independent	Jaipal Singh Rana	262	0.61%	New
Margin of victory		2,341	5.47%	▲0.78
Turnout		42,823	49.81%	▼1.44
Registered electors		85,980		▲6.57
INC gain from BJP		Swing	▲8.25	

=== Assembly Election 2017 ===
2017 Uttarakhand Legislative Assembly election: Pratapnagar
Party	Candidate	Votes	%	±%
BJP	Vijay Singh Panwar	15,058	36.42%	▲6.52
INC	Vikram Singh Negi	13,119	31.73%	▲0.43
Indian Business Party	Rajeshwar Prasad Painuly	5,594	13.53%	New
Independent	Murari Lal Khandwal	3,774	9.13%	New
UKD	Pankaj Vyas	1,078	2.61%	▼5.86
Independent	Vijaypal Singh Rawat	1,025	2.48%	New
NOTA	None of the above	556	1.34%	New
Independent	Mohan Singh Negi	503	1.22%	New
Independent	Kedar Lal	316	0.76%	New
BSP	Kanak Pal Singh	307	0.74%	▼7.01
Margin of victory		1,939	4.69%	▲3.29
Turnout		41,341	51.24%	▼1.84
Registered electors		80,678		▲10.47
BJP gain from INC		Swing	▲5.12	

=== Assembly Election 2012 ===
2012 Uttarakhand Legislative Assembly election: Pratapnagar
Party	Candidate	Votes	%	±%
INC	Vikram Singh Negi	12,135	31.30%	▲3.09
BJP	Vijay Singh Panwar	11,593	29.91%	▼5.81
Independent	Rajeshwar Prasad Painuly	7,927	20.45%	New
UKD	Ramchandra Singh Bisht	3,282	8.47%	▼0.74
BSP	Devi Singh	3,007	7.76%	▲6.22
Independent	Madan Singh	729	1.88%	New
Margin of victory		542	1.40%	▼6.10
Turnout		38,766	53.08%	▼4.35
Registered electors		73,031		
INC gain from BJP		Swing	▼4.41	

=== Assembly Election 2007 ===
2007 Uttarakhand Legislative Assembly election: Pratapnagar
Party	Candidate	Votes	%	±%
BJP	Vijay Singh Panwar	12,587	35.71%	▲14.97
INC	Phool Singh	9,943	28.21%	▼2.62
Independent	Rajeshwar Prasad Painuly	4,048	11.49%	New
UKD	Ram Chandra Singh	3,246	9.21%	▲5.22
CPI(M)	Sher Singh	1,359	3.86%	New
Independent	Sandeep Singh	954	2.71%	New
NCP	Jitendra Singh	901	2.56%	New
BJSH	Badri Prasad	893	2.53%	New
BSP	Sumer Singh	541	1.54%	▼0.33
SAP	Rukam Singh	450	1.28%	New
SP	Sabbal Singh	322	0.91%	▼0.41
Margin of victory		2,644	7.50%	▲3.43
Turnout		35,244	57.52%	▲2.71
Registered electors		61,362		
BJP gain from INC		Swing	▲4.88	

=== Assembly Election 2002 ===
2002 Uttaranchal Legislative Assembly election: Pratapnagar
Party	Candidate	Votes	%	±%
INC	Phool Singh	10,517	30.83%	New
Independent	Vijay Singh Panwar	9,128	26.76%	New
BJP	Lt. Col. Pitamber Dutt Kuriyal	7,076	20.74%	New
Independent	Sher Singh Rana	2,160	6.33%	New
Uttarakhand Janwadi Party	Kripal Singh Chauhan	1,369	4.01%	New
UKD	Trivendra Singh Panwar	1,361	3.99%	New
BSP	Rukam Singh Pokhriyal	636	1.86%	New
SP	Sabbal Singh	453	1.33%	New
Independent	Prem Dutt Nautiyal	442	1.30%	New
Independent	Ram Singh Kharola	385	1.13%	New
RLD	Om Prakash	319	0.94%	New
Margin of victory		1,389	4.07%	
Turnout		34,112	54.73%	
Registered electors		62,328		
INC win (new seat)				

== See also ==
- Tehri Garhwal (Lok Sabha constituency)
