= Hemwati Nandan Bahuguna =

Indian politician (1919–1989)

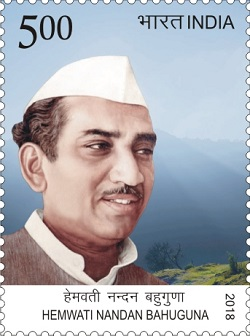
- Hemwati Nandan Bahuguna on a 2018 stamp of India

13th Union Minister of Finance
- In office 28 July 1979 – 25 October 1979
- Prime Minister: Charan Singh
- Preceded by: Charan Singh
- Succeeded by: Charan Singh

8th Chief Minister of Uttar Pradesh
- In office 8 November 1973 – 29 November 1975
- Preceded by: Kamalapati Tripathi
- Succeeded by: N. D. Tiwari

Member of Parliament, Lok Sabha
- In office 16 January 1980 – 31 December 1984
- Preceded by: Pandit Jagannath Sharma
- Succeeded by: Chandra Mohan Singh Negi
- Constituency: Garhwal
- In office 25 March 1977 – 16 January 1980
- Preceded by: Sheila Kaul
- Succeeded by: Sheila Kaul
- Constituency: Lucknow
- In office 25 March 1971 – 25 March 1977
- Preceded by: Hari Krishna Shastri
- Succeeded by: Janeshwar Mishra
- Constituency: Allahabad

Personal details
- Born: 25 April 1919 Pauri Garhwal, United Provinces of Agra and Oudh, British India (present-day Uttarakhand, India)
- Died: 17 March 1989 (aged 69) Cleveland, Ohio, U.S.
- Party: Bharatiya Lok Dal
- Other political affiliations: Indian National Congress, Janata Party, Congress for Democracy
- Spouse: Kamala Bahuguna
- Children: Vijay Bahuguna (son); Rita Bahuguna Joshi (daughter)
- Relatives: Saurabh Bahuguna (grandson)
- Education: Allahabad University

Hemwati Nandan Bahuguna (25 April 1919 – 17 March 1989) was an Indian National Congress leader and former Chief Minister of Uttar Pradesh; he later joined Bharatiya Lok Dal and worked with Charan Singh.

== Personal life ==
He was born on 25 April 1919 in Bughani, Pauri Garhwal, Uttarakhand in a Garhwali Brahmin family. The family later moved to Allahabad in Uttar Pradesh.

Little is known about his first marriage. His first wife always lived in his native village Bughani as a simple village woman. His second wife, Kamala Bahuguna, lived with him in Allahabad and was the mother of their three children:

- Their eldest son Vijay Bahuguna served as the Chief Minister of Uttarakhand. He was a former judge of Allahabad and Bombay High Court. He is a member of Bharatiya Janata Party. Vijay's son Saurabh is a Member of the Uttarakhand Legislative Assembly from BJP . He is serving as the Minister of Animal Husbandry, Fisheries, Skill Development & Employment, Protocol and Sugarcane Development in Pushkar Singh Dhami's cabinet of 2022.
- Second son Shekhar Bahuguna.
- The couple's daughter, Rita Bahuguna Joshi was chief of Uttar Pradesh Congress Committee. She also served as the Mayor of Allahabad. She is a member of Bharatiya Janata Party.

== Politics ==
=== Pre-independence ===
==== Students Parliament ====
He studied in D.A.V. School and Messmore Inter College of Pauri Town. He passed 10th from Pauri and went to the Government Intermediate College in Allahabad in 1937 in the Bachelor of Science programme. He received an Arts degree in 1946.

==== In jail ====
He was jailed as a part of Quit India movement from 1942 to 1946.

=== Post independence ===
==== Union Cabinet ====
In 1971, he was made State Minister for Communication in the Union Cabinet.

==== Chief Minister of Uttar Pradesh ====
In 1973, he was appointed the Chief Minister of Uttar Pradesh, the most populous state in India. However, his tenure was short and he was forced to resign by Prime minister Indira Gandhi in 1975.

==== Parting of ways with the Congress ====
In early 1977, when Indira Gandhi lifted the state emergency and called for new elections to the Lok Sabha, Bahuguna left the ruling Congress party of Indira and formed a new group called Congress for Democracy (CFD) with Jagjivan Ram and Nandini Satpathy. The CFD joined the Janata alliance to contest the elections. After the victory of the Janata alliance, Bahuguna joined the cabinet of Janata Prime Minister Morarji Desai as the minister of chemicals and fertilizers. In 1979, he became the Finance Minister under the short lived (August - December 1979) Charan Singh administration. During his term, Indian economy went into the last recession of the 20th century. Real GDP growth fell by massive 5.2% in 1979 due to the global energy crisis. Bahuguna withdrew from the government and joined hands with Indira Gandhi in October 1979.

In the January 1980 Parliamentary elections he won from Garhwal as Indira Gandhi's Congress(I) party candidate. But, he soon left the party and resigned his seat subsequently. He won the by-election for the seat in 1982.

==== 1984 Lok Sabha Elections ====
He contested against the Congress candidate, Amitabh Bachchan, in 1984 Parliamentary elections from Allahabad constituency. Bachchan won the election by approximately 1,87,000 votes. Later his wife Kamla Bahuguna also stood for by-elections from Allahabad.

=== Electoral history ===
- 1971 : Elected to Lok Sabha from Allahabad as member of Congress
- 1977 : Elected to Lok Sabha from Lucknow as member of 'Congress For Democracy', supported by Janata Party
- 1980 : Elected to Lok Sabha from Garhwal as member of Congress, but soon quit both Congress and Lok Sabha
- 1982 bypoll : Elected to Lok Sabha from Garhwal, defeating his Congress rival
- 1984 : Lost to Amitabh Bachchan in Prayagraj (Allahabad)

== Death ==
Bahuguna fell ill in 1988 and flew to the United States for coronary bypass surgery. The surgery was unsuccessful and he died 17 March 1989 in a Cleveland hospital.

== Legacy ==
- Hemwati Nandan Bahuguna Garhwal University, Uttarakhand's largest university in Srinagar, Pauri Garhwal
- Hemwati Nandan Bahuguna Uttarakhand Medical Education University, in Dehradun, Uttarakhand

Government offices
Preceded by -	Parliamentary Secretary for labour and industry of Uttar Pradesh; 10 April 1957 – 17 November 1958	Succeeded by -
Political offices
Preceded by -	Deputy Minister for labour and industry of Uttar Pradesh; 17 November 1958 – 6 December 1960	Succeeded by -
Preceded by -	Deputy Minister for labour and industry of Uttar Pradesh; 22 March 1962 – 26 August 1963	Succeeded by -
Preceded by -	Cabinet Minister for Finance of Uttar Pradesh; 14 March 1967 – 2 April 1967	Succeeded by -
Preceded by -	State Minister for Communication of India; 1971	Succeeded by -
Preceded by President's Rule; Administered by the Governor of Uttar Pradesh, Akbar Ali Khan title/post previously held by- Kamalapati Tripathi	Chief Minister of Uttar Pradesh; 8 November 1973 – 30 November 1975	Succeeded by President's Rule; Administered by the Governor of Uttar Pradesh, Dr M C Reddy title/post subsequently held by- Narayan Dutt Tiwari
Preceded by -	Cabinet Minister in the Department of Petroleum and Chemicals of India; 1977	Succeeded by -
Preceded by -	Finance Minister of India; 1979	Succeeded by -
