= Narayan Pal =

Indian politician

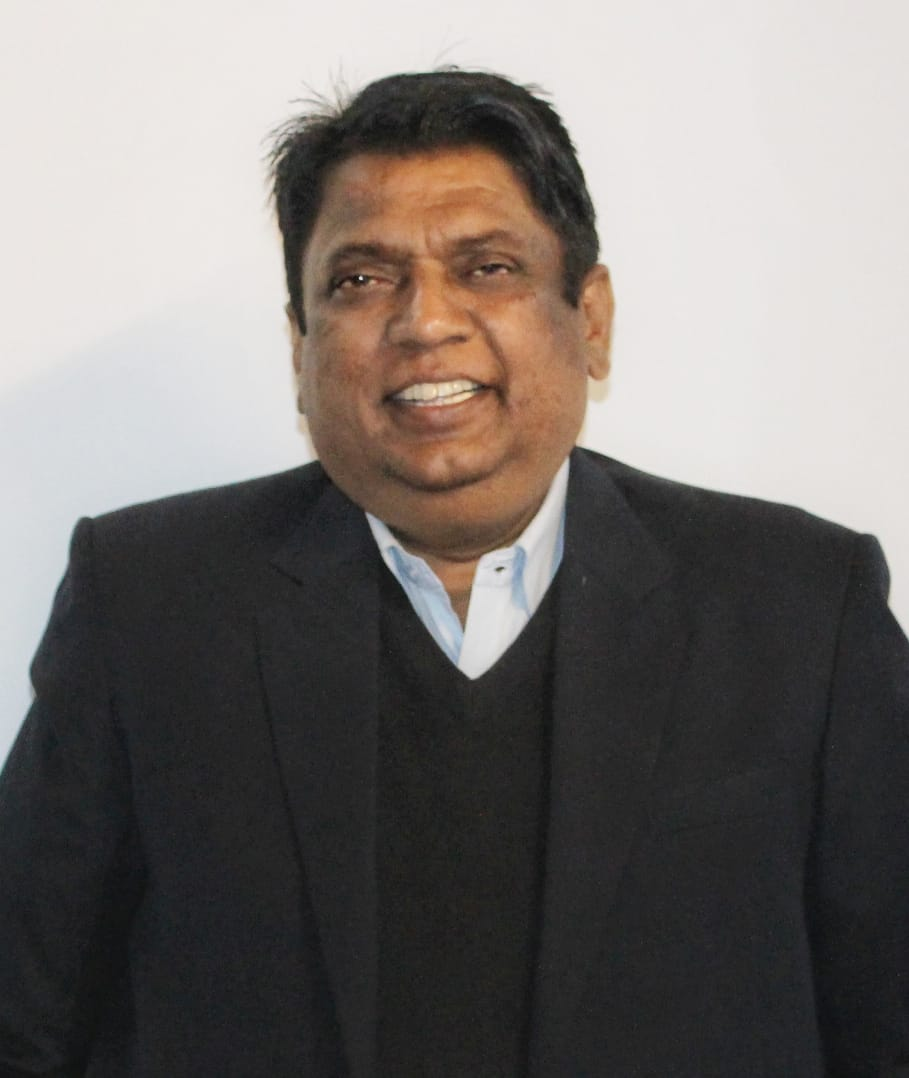
- Narayan Pal

Member of the Legislative Assembly
- In office 2002–2012
- Succeeded by: Kiran Mandal
- Constituency: Sitarganj (Udham Singh Nagar)

Personal details
- Born: 15 April 1965 (age 61) Haldwani, Nainital district, Uttar Pradesh, India
- Party: Indian National Congress
- Other political affiliations: Bahujan Samaj Party
- Spouse: Kamini Pal
- Children: 3
- Education: Kumaon University

Narayan Pal (born 15 April 1965) is an Indian politician. Narayan Pal is a two-time Member of the Legislative Assembly (Uttarakhand), having served from 2002 to 2012. He is currently a member of the Indian National Congress and was previously affiliated with the Bahujan Samaj Party party and has held various positions within the party, including leader of Vidhan Mandal Dal and Chairman of the Assurance Committee in the Uttarakhand Legislative Assembly. He re-joined the Indian National Congress in 2026.

== Early life and education ==
Narayan Pal was born in Haldwani city, Nainital district of the Uttar Pradesh (now Uttarakhand) on 15 April 1965 to Brijlal and Anandi Devi. He received a Bachelor of Arts from Kumaon University, Nainital.

== Political career ==
Starting at college level politics, he was elected joint secretary of MB PG College Kumaon University, Nainital, in 1984-85 session. He was president of Youth Congress Nainital district from 1990 to 1995. He resigned from Congress in 1995 and joined Samajwadi Party and contest Lok Sabha election against Narayan Dutt Tiwari (Congress Tiwari).
In 2002 and 2007 he was elected Member of the Legislative Assembly (MLA) (Uttarakhand) from Sitarganj (Udham Singh Nagar) constituency. He was Leader Vidhan Mandal Dal (BSP) in 2002 and Chairman Assurance Committee, Uttarakhand Legislative Assembly in 2007. He contested Lok Sabha Election from BSP in 2009 as well. He was defeated in 2012 by Bharatiya Janata Party candidate Kiran Mandal. He left the Bahujan Samaj Party and joined Congress. He again left the Congress to join BSP in 2022. He rejoined the Congress in 2026.

== Business ==
Narayan Pal is also chairman of Pal College of Technology and Management. and the owner of Pal Group Haldwani, India, which comprises several industries and operates in various sectors, some of which are as follows:

- Pal College of Technology & Management (PCTM)
- Brij Lal Hospital & Research Center.
- Pal College of Nursing & Medical Sciences

== Personal life ==
Narayan Pal is married to Kamini Pal since 14 January 1994. They have three children. His family currently resides in Haldwani, Nainital.
