= Gangotri Assembly constituency =

Constituency of the Uttarakhand legislative assembly in India

Coordinates: 31.00°N 78.94°E

Gangotri
- Constituency No. 3 for the Uttarakhand Legislative Assembly

Constituency details
- Country: India
- Region: North India
- State: Uttarakhand
- District: Uttarkashi
- Lok Sabha constituency: Tehri Garhwal
- Total electors: 86,938
- Reservation: None

Member of Legislative Assembly
- 5th Uttarakhand Legislative Assembly
- Incumbent Suresh Singh Chauhan
- Party: Bharatiya Janta Party
- Elected year: 2022

Gangotri Legislative Assembly constituency is one of the 70 assembly constituencies of Uttarakhand a northern state of India. Gangotri is part of Tehri Garhwal Lok Sabha constituency.

== Members of the Legislative Assembly ==
Election	Member	Party
2002	Vijaypal Singh Sajwan	Indian National Congress
2007	Gopal Singh Rawat	Bharatiya Janata Party
2012	Vijaypal Singh Sajwan	Indian National Congress
2017	Gopal Singh Rawat	Bharatiya Janata Party
2022	Suresh Singh Chauhan	Bharatiya Janata Party

== Election results ==
=== 2027 Assembly election ===
2027 Uttarakhand Legislative Assembly election: Gangotri
Party	Candidate	Votes	%	±%
INC				
BJP				
NOTA	None of the above			
Majority				
Turnout				
gain from		Swing		

=== Assembly Election 2022 ===
2022 Uttarakhand Legislative Assembly election: Gangotri
Party	Candidate	Votes	%	±%
BJP	Suresh Singh Chauhan	29,619	49.66%	▲3.82
INC	Vijaypal Singh Sajwan	21,590	36.20%	▲7.51
AAP	Retd.Col. Ajay Kothiyal	6,161	10.33%	New
Independent	Navneet Uniyal	476	0.80%	New
BSP	Budhi Lal	394	0.66%	▼0.37
CPI	Mahavir Prasad	372	0.62%	▼0.36
UKD	Jasveer Singh	351	0.59%	New
NOTA	None of the above	241	0.40%	▼1.27
Margin of victory		8,029	13.46%	▼3.69
Turnout		59,649	67.47%	▼0.51
Registered electors		88,403		▲7.27
BJP hold		Swing	▲3.82	

=== Assembly Election 2017 ===
2017 Uttarakhand Legislative Assembly election: Gangotri
Party	Candidate	Votes	%	±%
BJP	Gopal Singh Rawat	25,683	45.84%	▲19.69
INC	Vijaypal Singh Sajwan	16,073	28.69%	▼11.36
Independent	Suratram Nautiyal	9,491	16.94%	New
Independent	Bhupendra Singh	1,526	2.72%	New
NOTA	None of the above	937	1.67%	New
BSP	Vijaypal Tangani	576	1.03%	▼1.11
CPI	Mahaveer Prasad	553	0.99%	▼1.69
Rashtriya Jan Sahay Dal	Rajbeer Singh Parmar	412	0.74%	New
Margin of victory		9,610	17.15%	▲3.26
Turnout		56,028	67.98%	▼2.80
Registered electors		82,415		▲15.37
BJP gain from INC		Swing	▲5.80	

=== Assembly Election 2012 ===
2012 Uttarakhand Legislative Assembly election: Gangotri
Party	Candidate	Votes	%	±%
INC	Vijaypal Singh Sajwan	20,246	40.04%	▲3.30
BJP	Gopal Singh Rawat	13,223	26.15%	▼21.48
Independent	Suresh Singh	6,436	12.73%	New
Independent	Kishan Singh	5,595	11.07%	New
Independent	Hari Shankar	1,417	2.80%	New
CPI	Dinesh Nautiyal	1,356	2.68%	▼1.78
BSP	Hukam Singh	1,080	2.14%	▼2.48
UKD	Bhagwati Prasad Bahuguna	584	1.16%	New
UKPP	Ravindra	287	0.57%	New
Margin of victory		7,023	13.89%	▲3.00
Turnout		50,560	70.78%	▲0.52
Registered electors		71,433		▼1.42
INC gain from BJP		Swing	▼7.59	

=== Assembly Election 2007 ===
2007 Uttarakhand Legislative Assembly election: Gangotri
Party	Candidate	Votes	%	±%
BJP	Gopal Singh Rawat	24,250	47.63%	▲29.52
INC	Vijaypal Singh Sajwan	18,704	36.74%	▲15.83
BSP	Chaitram	2,348	4.61%	▲2.13
CPI	Kamala Ram	2,272	4.46%	▼14.83
Independent	Pratap Singh	832	1.63%	New
BJSH	Jagdish Singh Pokhriyal	611	1.20%	New
NCP	Dr. Devendra Dutt Semwal	472	0.93%	New
Independent	Naresh Chamoli	380	0.75%	New
LJP	Narayani	377	0.74%	New
JD(S)	Pooranchand	257	0.50%	New
Margin of victory		5,546	10.89%	▲9.27
Turnout		50,911	70.47%	▲10.46
Registered electors		72,462		▲15.01
BJP gain from INC		Swing	▲26.72	

=== Assembly Election 2002 ===
2002 Uttaranchal Legislative Assembly election: Gangotri
Party	Candidate	Votes	%	±%
INC	Vijaypal Singh Sajwan	7,878	20.91%	New
CPI	Kamala Ram Nautiyal	7,268	19.29%	New
BJP	Budhi Singh Panwar	6,822	18.11%	New
Independent	Hari Singh Rana	6,005	15.94%	New
Uttarakhand Janwadi Party	Chandan Singh Rana	4,082	10.83%	New
Independent	Devendra Dutt Semwal	1,081	2.87%	New
Independent	Jagendra Singh Bist	948	2.52%	New
BSP	Budhi Ballabh Joshi	936	2.48%	New
Independent	Kamleshwar	646	1.71%	New
Independent	Shanti Prasad Thapliyal	613	1.63%	New
SAP	Mahabeer Singh Chauhan	447	1.19%	New
Margin of victory		610	1.62%	
Turnout		37,675	59.90%	
Registered electors		63,007		
INC win (new seat)				

== See also ==
- Uttarkashi (Uttarakhand Assembly constituency)
