= Tharali Assembly constituency =

Constituency of the Uttarakhand legislative assembly in India

Coordinates: 30.07°N 79.50°E

Tharali
- Constituency No. 5 for the Uttarakhand Legislative Assembly

Constituency details
- Country: India
- Region: North India
- State: Uttarakhand
- District: Chamoli
- Lok Sabha constituency: Garhwal
- Total electors: 102,789
- Reservation: None

Member of Legislative Assembly
- 5th Uttarakhand Legislative Assembly
- Incumbent Bhupal Ram Tamta
- Party: Bharatiya Janata Party
- Elected year: 2022

Tharali is one of the 70 assembly constituencies of Uttarakhand, a northern state of India. Tharali is part of Garhwal Lok Sabha constituency.

== Members of the Legislative Assembly ==
Election	Member	Party
2012	Dr. Jeet Ram	Indian National Congress
2017	Magan Lal Shah	Bharatiya Janata Party
2018 By-election	Munni Devi Shah	Bharatiya Janata Party
2022	Bhupal Ram Tamta	Bharatiya Janata Party

== Election results ==
=== 2027 Assembly election ===
2027 Uttarakhand Legislative Assembly election: Tharali
Party	Candidate	Votes	%	±%
INC				
BJP				
NOTA	None of the above			
Majority				
Turnout				
gain from		Swing		

=== Assembly Election 2022 ===
2022 Uttarakhand Legislative Assembly election: Tharali
Party	Candidate	Votes	%	±%
BJP	Bhupal Ram Tamta	32,852	51.66%	▲2.62
INC	Dr. Jeet Ram	24,550	38.61%	▼6.66
AAP	Guddu Lal	1,866	2.93%	New
Uttarakhand Janekta Party	Naini Ram	970	1.53%	New
CPI(M)	Kunwar Ram	834	1.31%	New
BSP	Laxman Ram	725	1.14%	New
NOTA	None of the above	663	1.04%	▼0.30
Independent	Ganesh Kumar	527	0.83%	New
UKD	Kasbi Lal Shah	388	0.61%	New
Margin of victory		8,302	13.06%	▲9.28
Turnout		63,592	59.65%	▲8.48
Registered electors		1,06,614		▲3.94
BJP hold		Swing	▲2.62	

=== Assembly By-election 2018 ===
2018 Uttarakhand Legislative Assembly by-election: Tharali
Party	Candidate	Votes	%	±%
BJP	Munni Devi Shah	25,737	49.04%	▲5.64
INC	Dr. Jeet Ram	23,756	45.27%	▲10.00
	Kasbi Lal Shah	1,365	2.60%	New
CPI(M)	Kunwar Ram	1,034	1.97%	▲0.71
NOTA	None of the above	705	1.34%	New
Independent	Beeri Ram	587	1.12%	New
Margin of victory		1,981	3.77%	▼4.36
Turnout		52,479	51.98%	▼6.82
Registered electors		1,02,569		▼0.45
BJP hold		Swing	▲5.64	

=== Assembly Election 2017 ===
2017 Uttarakhand Legislative Assembly election: Tharali
Party	Candidate	Votes	%	±%
BJP	Magan Lal Shah	25,931	43.40%	▲12.06
INC	Dr. Jeet Ram	21,073	35.27%	▲2.67
Independent	Guddu Lal	7,089	11.86%	New
NOTA	None of the above	1,761	2.95%	New
BSP	Mohan Lal Kanyal	850	1.42%	▼0.56
CPI(M)	Rajpal Kanyal	752	1.26%	▼6.71
Independent	Capt. (Retd) Ganesh Kumar	593	0.99%	New
UKD	Kasbi Lal Shah	337	0.56%	▼0.56
Margin of victory		4,858	8.13%	▲6.87
Turnout		59,748	57.99%	▼1.05
Registered electors		1,03,033		
BJP gain from INC		Swing	▲10.80	

=== Assembly Election 2012 ===
2012 Uttarakhand Legislative Assembly election: Tharali
Party	Candidate	Votes	%	±%
INC	Dr. Jeet Ram	17,404	32.60%	New
BJP	Magan Lal	16,731	31.34%	New
CPI(M)	Rajpal Kanyal	4,256	7.97%	New
Independent	Sundra Lal	3,473	6.51%	New
Independent	Mahes Shankar	3,151	5.90%	New
Independent	Govind Lal Shah	2,027	3.80%	New
Independent	Radhaballbh	1,723	3.23%	New
BSP	Narendra Kumar	1,060	1.99%	New
NCP	Manjeet Ram	630	1.18%	New
UKD	Rakesh Lal Khanada	598	1.12%	New
LJP	Vinod Kumar	566	1.06%	New
Margin of victory		673	1.26%	
Turnout		53,380	59.04%	
Registered electors		90,407		
INC win (new seat)				

== See also ==
- Pindar Assembly constituency
- Chamoli district
- List of constituencies of the Uttarakhand Legislative Assembly
