= Sitarganj Assembly constituency =

Legislative Assembly constituency in Uttarakhand State, India

Coordinates: 28.93°N 79.7°E

Sitarganj
- Constituency No. 68 for the Uttarakhand Legislative Assembly

Constituency details
- Country: India
- Region: North India
- State: Uttarakhand
- District: Udham Singh Nagar
- Lok Sabha constituency: Nainital–Udhamsingh Nagar
- Total electors: 123,168
- Reservation: None

Member of Legislative Assembly
- 5th Uttarakhand Legislative Assembly
- Incumbent Saurabh Bahuguna
- Party: Bharatiya Janata Party
- Elected year: 2022

Sitarganj Legislative Assembly constituency is one of the seventy electoral Uttarakhand Legislative Assembly constituencies of Uttarakhand state in India.

Sitarganj Legislative Assembly constituency is a part of Nainital-Udhamsingh Nagar constituency.

== Members of the Legislative Assembly ==
Election	Member	Party
2002	Narayan Pal	Bahujan Samaj Party
2007	Narayan Pal	Bahujan Samaj Party
Major boundary changes
2012	Kiran Mandal	Bharatiya Janata Party
2012^	Vijay Bahuguna	Indian National Congress
2017	Saurabh Bahuguna	Bharatiya Janata Party
2022	Saurabh Bahuguna	Bharatiya Janata Party

^By poll

== Election results ==
=== 2027 Assembly election ===
2027 Uttarakhand Legislative Assembly election: Sitarganj
Party	Candidate	Votes	%	±%
INC				
BJP				
NOTA	None of the above			
Majority				
Turnout				
gain from		Swing		

=== Assembly Election 2022 ===
2022 Uttarakhand Legislative Assembly election: Sitarganj
Party	Candidate	Votes	%	±%
BJP	Saurabh Bahuguna	43,354	44.81%	▼13.01
INC	Navtej Pal Singh	32,416	33.50%	▲8.20
AAP	Ajay Jaiswal	10,135	10.47%	New
BSP	Narayan Pal	9,258	9.57%	▼4.02
NOTA	None of the above	534	0.55%	▼0.11
Margin of victory		10,938	11.30%	▼21.20
Turnout		96,758	78.56%	▼2.80
Registered electors		1,23,168		▲14.50
BJP hold		Swing	▼13.01	

=== Assembly Election 2017 ===
2017 Uttarakhand Legislative Assembly election: Sitarganj
Party	Candidate	Votes	%	±%
BJP	Saurabh Bahuguna	50,597	57.81%	▲37.99
INC	Malti Biswas	22,147	25.31%	▼51.84
BSP	Navtej Pal Singh	11,892	13.59%	New
SP	Yogendra Kumar Yadav	811	0.93%	New
NOTA	None of the above	580	0.66%	New
Margin of victory		28,450	32.51%	▼24.82
Turnout		87,520	81.36%	▲5.14
Registered electors		1,07,570		▲17.64
BJP gain from INC		Swing	▼19.33	

=== Assembly By-election 2012 ===
2012 Uttarakhand Legislative Assembly by-election: Sitarganj
Party	Candidate	Votes	%	±%
INC	Vijay Bahuguna	53,766	77.14%	▲56.13
BJP	Prakash Pant	13,812	19.82%	▼19.85
Independent	S. Ali	793	1.14%	New
UKPP	D. S. Bisht	668	0.96%	New
Independent	P. Singh	438	0.63%	New
Margin of victory		39,954	57.33%	▲40.24
Turnout		69,695	76.22%	▼4.47
Registered electors		91,443		
INC gain from BJP		Swing	▲37.48	

=== Assembly Election 2012 ===
2012 Uttarakhand Legislative Assembly election: Sitarganj
Party	Candidate	Votes	%	±%
BJP	Kiran Mandal	29,280	39.67%	▲17.41
BSP	Narayan Pal	16,668	22.58%	▼16.71
INC	Suresh Kumar	15,508	21.01%	▼7.84
Independent	Anwar Ahmad	7,085	9.60%	New
SP	Vinay Krishna Mondal	1,456	1.97%	▼3.83
Independent	Ishwari Prasad	1,338	1.81%	New
IJP	Harcharan Singh	841	1.14%	New
PECP	Sartaj Ali	667	0.90%	New
UKD	Shaheen Khan	393	0.53%	New
Margin of victory		12,612	17.09%	▲6.64
Turnout		73,813	80.69%	▲7.15
Registered electors		91,480		
BJP gain from BSP		Swing	▲0.38	

=== Assembly Election 2007 ===
2007 Uttarakhand Legislative Assembly election: Sitarganj
Party	Candidate	Votes	%	±%
BSP	Narayan Pal	31,745	39.29%	▲3.36
INC	Kanta Prasad Sagar	23,308	28.85%	▲19.86
BJP	Khoob Singh Vikal	17,982	22.26%	▼3.50
SP	Khajan Chandra	4,688	5.80%	▼14.82
Independent	Suraj Bhan	930	1.15%	New
BJSH	Prabhu Nath	682	0.84%	New
LJP	Sohan Lal	448	0.55%	▼0.54
NBNP	Vijay Kumar	434	0.54%	New
Margin of victory		8,437	10.44%	▲0.27
Turnout		80,796	73.55%	▲12.31
Registered electors		1,09,870		▲20.85
BSP hold		Swing	▲3.36	

=== Assembly Election 2002 ===
2002 Uttaranchal Legislative Assembly election: Sitarganj
Party	Candidate	Votes	%	±%
BSP	Narayan Pal	20,001	35.93%	New
BJP	Beena Arya	14,339	25.76%	New
SP	Kanta Prasad	11,478	20.62%	New
INC	Bihari Lal	5,005	8.99%	New
RLD	Ram Nagina	4,229	7.60%	New
LJP	Dhan Raj	610	1.10%	New
Margin of victory		5,662	10.17%	
Turnout		55,662	61.22%	
Registered electors		90,916		
BSP win (new seat)				

== See also ==
- Sitarganj
- List of constituencies of the Uttarakhand Legislative Assembly
- Udham Singh Nagar district
