= Gangolihat Assembly constituency =

Constituency of the Uttarakhand legislative assembly in India

Coordinates: 29.67°N 80.05°E

Gangolihat
- Constituency No. 45 for the Uttarakhand Legislative Assembly

Constituency details
- Country: India
- Region: North India
- State: Uttarakhand
- District: Pithoragarh
- Lok Sabha constituency: Almora
- Established: 2002
- Total electors: 102,791
- Reservation: SC

Member of Legislative Assembly
- 5th Uttarakhand Legislative Assembly
- Incumbent Fakir Ram Tamta
- Party: Bharatiya Janata Party
- Elected year: 2022

Gangolihat is one of the 70 Legislative Assembly constituencies of Uttarakhand state in India.

It is part of Pithoragarh district and is reserved for candidates belonging to the Scheduled castes. Gangolihat is often characterized as a bellwether seat, having voted for the winning party in every state election since 2002.

== Members of the Legislative Assembly ==
Election	Member	Party
2002	Narayan Ram Arya	Indian National Congress
2007	Joga Ram Tamta	Bharatiya Janata Party
2012	Narayan Ram Arya	Indian National Congress
2017	Meena Gangola	Bharatiya Janata Party
2022	Fakir Ram Tamta	Bharatiya Janata Party

== Election results ==
=== 2027 Assembly election ===
2027 Uttarakhand Legislative Assembly election: Gangolihat
Party	Candidate	Votes	%	±%
INC				
BJP				
NOTA	None of the above			
Majority				
Turnout				
gain from		Swing		

=== Assembly Election 2022 ===
2022 Uttarakhand Legislative Assembly election: Gangolihat
Party	Candidate	Votes	%	±%
BJP	Fakir Ram Tamta	32,296	55.65%	▲18.59
INC	Khajan Chandra Guddu	22,243	38.33%	▲2.73
NOTA	None of the above	1,117	1.92%	▲0.35
UKD	Hari Prasad	1,004	1.73%	▲0.73
AAP	Babita Chandra	554	0.95%	New
BSP	Rekha	535	0.92%	▼0.29
SP	Bal Ram	283	0.49%	New
Margin of victory		10,053	17.32%	▲15.86
Turnout		58,032	54.88%	▼0.04
Registered electors		1,05,736		▲5.40
BJP hold		Swing	▲18.59	

=== Assembly Election 2017 ===
2017 Uttarakhand Legislative Assembly election: Gangolihat
Party	Candidate	Votes	%	±%
BJP	Meena Gangola	20,418	37.06%	▲2.74
INC	Narayan Ram Arya	19,613	35.60%	▼14.86
Independent	Khajan Chandra Guddu	10,763	19.54%	New
BSD	Dinesh Kumar	958	1.74%	New
NOTA	None of the above	865	1.57%	New
Independent	Sumitra Devi	841	1.53%	New
BSP	Deepak Kumar	668	1.21%	▼5.17
UKD	Harish Prashad	550	1.00%	▼2.23
Margin of victory		805	1.46%	▼14.67
Turnout		55,092	54.92%	▼0.55
Registered electors		1,00,315		▲13.90
BJP gain from INC		Swing	▼13.40	

=== Assembly Election 2012 ===
2012 Uttarakhand Legislative Assembly election: Gangolihat
Party	Candidate	Votes	%	±%
INC	Narayan Ram Arya	24,648	50.46%	▲16.04
BJP	Geeta Thakur Gowal	16,768	34.33%	▼8.12
BSP	Narayan Ram Sanguri	3,120	6.39%	▲0.49
UKD	Dinesh Arya	1,576	3.23%	▼0.38
Independent	Harish Prashad	1,186	2.43%	New
LJP	Jyoti Rani	788	1.61%	▼0.89
URM	Bachi Ram Koli	493	1.01%	New
Margin of victory		7,880	16.13%	▲8.11
Turnout		48,849	55.46%	▲0.70
Registered electors		88,073		▲38.76
INC gain from BJP		Swing	▲8.01	

=== Assembly Election 2007 ===
2007 Uttarakhand Legislative Assembly election: Gangolihat
Party	Candidate	Votes	%	±%
BJP	Joga Ram Tamta	14,755	42.45%	▲10.49
INC	Narayan Ram Arya	11,965	34.42%	▲0.68
Independent	Fakeer Ram	3,089	8.89%	New
BSP	Anuli	2,050	5.90%	▲1.51
UKD	Dhaniram	1,253	3.60%	▼2.13
LJP	Raj Kumar	870	2.50%	New
Vishwa Vikas Sangh	Ashok Kumar	779	2.24%	New
Margin of victory		2,790	8.03%	▲6.24
Turnout		34,761	54.77%	▲6.32
Registered electors		63,472		▲16.59
BJP gain from INC		Swing	▲8.71	

=== Assembly Election 2002 ===
2002 Uttaranchal Legislative Assembly election: Gangolihat
Party	Candidate	Votes	%	±%
INC	Narayan Ram Arya	8,898	33.74%	New
BJP	Joga Ram Tamta	8,428	31.96%	New
Independent	Geeta Thakur Gowal	3,286	12.46%	New
Independent	Harish Prashad	2,501	9.48%	New
UKD	Hari Ram Agari	1,513	5.74%	New
BSP	Sunder Ram	1,158	4.39%	New
SP	Narayan Ram	590	2.24%	New
Margin of victory		470	1.78%	
Turnout		26,374	48.48%	
Registered electors		54,441		
INC win (new seat)				

== See also ==
- List of constituencies of the Uttarakhand Legislative Assembly
- Pithoragarh district
