= Vijay Singh Panwar =

Indian politician

Member of Uttarakhand Legislative Assembly
- In office 2017–2022
- Preceded by: Vikram Singh Negi
- Succeeded by: Vikram Singh Negi
- Constituency: Pratapnagar
- In office 2007–2012
- Preceded by: Phool Singh
- Succeeded by: Vikram Singh Negi
- Constituency: Pratapnagar

Personal details
- Party: Bharatiya Janata Party

Vijay Singh Panwar (nicknamed Guddu Bhai) is an Indian politician from Uttarakhand who served as Member of Uttarakhand Legislative Assembly from Pratapnagar as a member of the Bharatiya Janata Party from 2007 to 2012 and from 2017 to 2022.

== Education ==
Panwar is a post graduate and he has a degree of L.L.B and M.A from Garhwal University.
