= Vijaypal Singh Sajwan =

Indian politician

Member of Legislative Assembly, Uttarakhand
- In office 2002–2007
- Constituency: Gangotri Dham
- In office 2012–2017
- Constituency: Gangotri Dham

Personal details
- Born: 26-04-1958
- Party: Bhartiya Janata Party (since 2024)
- Parent: Late Shri Padam Singh Sajwan
- Profession: Politician

Vijaypal Singh Sajwan is an Indian politician from Uttarakhand and a two term Member of the Uttarakhand Legislative Assembly. He represented the Gangotri Assembly constituency in 1st & 3rd Uttarakhand Legislative Assembly Elections.He joined the BJP in 2024.

== Positions held ==
Year	Description
1992 - 1997	Member - Nagar Palika Parishad Uttarkashi
1997 - 2002	Chairman - Nagar Palika Parishad Uttarkashi
2002 - 2007	Elected to 1st Uttarakhand Assembly: Chairman - Estimates Committee (2002 – 04); Member - Public Accounts Committee (2004–05); Member - Petition Committee (2004 – 07)
2012 - 2017	Elected to 3rd Uttarakhand Assembly (2nd term)

=== Electoral Performances ===
Year	Election	Party	Constituency Name	Result	Votes gained	Vote share%	Margin
2002	1st Uttarakhand Assembly	Indian National Congress	Gangotri	Won	7,878	20.91%	610
2007	2nd Uttarakhand Assembly	Indian National Congress	Gangotri	Lost	18,703	36.73%	5,546
2012	3rd Uttarakhand Assembly	Indian National Congress	Gangotri	Won	20,246	40.13%	7,023
2017	4th Uttarakhand Assembly	Indian National Congress	Gangotri	Lost	16,073	29.37%	9,610
2022	5th Uttarakhand Assembly	Indian National Congress	Gangotri	Lost	21,590	36.20%	8,029
