= Vikram Singh Negi =

Indian politician

Member of Uttarakhand Legislative Assembly
- Incumbent
- Assumed office 2022
- Preceded by: Vijay Singh Panwar
- Constituency: Pratapnagar
- In office 2012–2017
- Preceded by: Vijay Singh Panwar
- Succeeded by: Vijay Singh Panwar
- Constituency: Pratapnagar

Personal details
- Party: Indian National Congress

Vikram Singh Negi is an Indian politician from Uttarakhand who serves as Member of Uttarakhand Legislative Assembly from Pratapnagar as a member of Indian National Congress.
