= Hari Das =

Indian politician

Member of the Legislative Assembly
- In office 2012–2017
- Succeeded by: Deshraj Karanwal
- Constituency: Jhabrera
- In office 2002–2012
- Constituency: Landhaura

Personal details
- Party: Bhartiya Janata Party
- Other political affiliations: Bahujan Samaj Party

Hari Das is an Indian politician and member of the Bharatiya Janata Party. He is a former member of the Uttarakhand Legislative Assembly. He won elections to the Uttarakhand legislative assembly in 2002 and 2007, representing the Landhaura Assembly constituency. In 2012, he was elected as representative of the Jhabrera Assembly constituency to the Uttarakhand Legislative Assembly, representing the Bahujan Samaj Party. He joined the BJP in 2024.
