= Jhabrera Assembly constituency =

Constituency of the Uttarakhand legislative assembly in India

Coordinates: 29.81°N 77.77°E

Jhabrera
- Constituency No. 29 for the Uttarakhand Legislative Assembly

Constituency details
- Country: India
- Region: North India
- State: Uttarakhand
- District: Haridwar
- Lok Sabha constituency: Haridwar
- Total electors: 121,491 (2022)
- Reservation: SC

Member of Legislative Assembly
- 5th Uttarakhand Legislative Assembly
- Incumbent Virendra Kumar Jaati
- Party: Indian National Congress
- Elected year: 2022

Jhabrera Legislative Assembly constituency (SC) is one of the seventy electoral Uttarakhand Legislative Assembly constituencies of Uttarakhand state in India. It includes Jhabrera area of Haridwar District. Jhabrera Legislative Assembly constituency (SC) is a part of Haridwar (Lok Sabha constituency). The constituency also covers 5 wards of the Roorkee Municipal Corporation.

== Members of the Legislative Assembly ==
| Election | Member | Party |
|---|---|---|
| 2012 | Hari Das | Bahujan Samaj Party |
| 2017 | Deshraj Karnwal | Bharatiya Janata Party |
| 2022 | Virendra Kumar | Indian National Congress |

== Election results ==
=== 2027 Assembly election ===
2027 Uttarakhand Legislative Assembly election: Jhabrera
| Party | Candidate | Votes | % | ±% |
|---|---|---|---|---|
| INC | | | | |
| BSP | Adesh Kumar | | | |
| NOTA | None of the above | | | |
| Majority | | | | |
| Turnout | | | | |
| gain from | | Swing | | |

=== Assembly Election 2022 ===
2022 Uttarakhand Legislative Assembly election: Jhabrera
| Party | Candidate | Votes | % | ±% |
|---|---|---|---|---|
| INC | Virendra Kumar | 39,652 | 41.55% | ▲6.16 |
| BJP | Rajpal Singh | 31,436 | 32.94% | ▼5.12 |
| BSP | Aditya Brajwal | 22,458 | 23.54% | ▼0.7 |
| NOTA | None of the above | 385 | 0.40% | ▼0.04 |
| Margin of victory | | 8,216 | 8.61% | ▲5.94 |
| Turnout | | 95,433 | 78.40% | ▲2.08 |
| Registered electors | | 1,21,725 | | ▲9.99 |
| INC gain from BJP | | Swing | ▲3.49 | |

=== Assembly Election 2017 ===
2017 Uttarakhand Legislative Assembly election: Jhabrera
| Party | Candidate | Votes | % | ±% |
|---|---|---|---|---|
| BJP | Deshraj Karnwal | 32,146 | 38.06% | ▲14.74 |
| INC | Rajpal Singh | 29,893 | 35.39% | ▲8.03 |
| BSP | Bhagavat Singh | 20,468 | 24.23% | ▼8.62 |
| SP | Vimla | 470 | 0.56% | ▼3.81 |
| NOTA | None of the above | 373 | 0.44% | New |
| Margin of victory | | 2,253 | 2.67% | ▼2.83 |
| Turnout | | 84,462 | 76.32% | ▲3.50 |
| Registered electors | | 1,10,668 | | ▲16.21 |
| BJP gain from BSP | | Swing | ▲5.21 | |

=== Assembly Election 2012 ===
2012 Uttarakhand Legislative Assembly election: Jhabrera
| Party | Candidate | Votes | % | ±% |
|---|---|---|---|---|
| BSP | Hari Das | 22,781 | 32.85% | New |
| INC | Rajpal | 18,972 | 27.36% | New |
| BJP | Vaiyajanti Mala | 16,173 | 23.32% | New |
| RLD | Budh Singh | 3,981 | 5.74% | New |
| SP | Rajendra Kumar Badi | 3,031 | 4.37% | New |
| Rashtriya Lok Nirman Party | Bimla | 1,373 | 1.98% | New |
| CPI | Madan Singh Khalsa | 881 | 1.27% | New |
| Independent | Nauratu Singh | 612 | 0.88% | New |
| Independent | Sanjay Kumar | 496 | 0.72% | New |
| Maidani Kranti Dal | Jaiprakash | 407 | 0.59% | New |
| Margin of victory | | 3,809 | 5.49% | |
| Turnout | | 69,346 | 72.82% | |
| Registered electors | | 95,231 | | |
| BSP win (new seat) | | | | |
