= Lalkuan Assembly constituency =

Constituency of the Uttarakhand legislative assembly in India

Coordinates: 29.07°N 79.52°E

Lalkuan
- Constituency No. 56 for the Uttarakhand Legislative Assembly

Constituency details
- Country: India
- Region: North India
- State: Uttarakhand
- District: Nainital
- Lok Sabha constituency: Nainital–Udhamsingh Nagar
- Total electors: 120,392
- Reservation: None

Member of Legislative Assembly
- 5th Uttarakhand Legislative Assembly
- Incumbent M. S. Bisht
- Party: Bharatiya Janata Party
- Elected year: 2022

Lalkuan Legislative Assembly constituency is one of the 70 Legislative Assembly constituencies of Uttarakhand state in India. It includes the Lalkuan, Halduchaur and Bindukhatta area in Lalkuan tehsil and Gaulapar and Chorgallia in Haldwani tehsil. It also includes wards from 55 to 60 of Haldwani Municipal Corporation.

It is part of Nainital district.

== Members of the Legislative Assembly ==
Election	Member	Party
2012	Harish Chandra Durgapal	Independent politician
2017	Naveen Chandra Dumka	Bharatiya Janata Party
2022	Dr. Mohan Singh Bisht	Bharatiya Janata Party

== Election results ==
=== 2027 Assembly election ===
2027 Uttarakhand Legislative Assembly election: Lalkuan
Party	Candidate	Votes	%	±%
INC				
BJP				
NOTA	None of the above			
Majority				
Turnout				
gain from		Swing		

=== Assembly Election 2022 ===
2022 Uttarakhand Legislative Assembly election: Lalkuan
Party	Candidate	Votes	%	±%
BJP	Dr. Mohan Singh Bisht	46,307	53.23%	▼1.43
INC	Harish Rawat	28,780	33.08%	▲11.87
Independent	Sandhya Dalakoti	3,908	4.49%	New
Independent	Pawan Kumar Chauhan	2,339	2.69%	New
Independent	Kundan Singh Mehta	1,552	1.78%	New
Independent	Yashpal Arya	901	1.04%	New
AAP	Chandra Sekhar Pandey	898	1.03%	New
NOTA	None of the above	689	0.79%	▼0.71
Independent	Virenderpuri Maharaj	527	0.61%	New
Margin of victory		17,527	20.15%	▼13.31
Turnout		86,996	71.61%	▼0.76
Registered electors		1,21,488		▲8.51
BJP hold		Swing	▼1.43	

=== Assembly Election 2017 ===
2017 Uttarakhand Legislative Assembly election: Lalkuan
Party	Candidate	Votes	%	±%
BJP	Naveen Chandra Dumka	44,293	54.66%	▲30.45
INC	Harish Chandra Durgapal	17,185	21.21%	▲0.67
Independent	Harendra Singh Bora	14,709	18.15%	New
NOTA	None of the above	1,216	1.50%	New
BSP	Rajeev Mohan	964	1.19%	▼4.32
CPI(ML)L	Purushottam Sharma	793	0.98%	▼0.42
Independent	Virendra Puri Maharaj	592	0.73%	New
Shivsena	Chandan Singh Rana	407	0.50%	New
Margin of victory		27,108	33.45%	▲20.35
Turnout		81,029	72.37%	▼2.41
Registered electors		1,11,965		▲24.05
BJP gain from Independent		Swing	▲17.34	

=== Assembly Election 2012 ===
2012 Uttarakhand Legislative Assembly election: Lalkuan
Party	Candidate	Votes	%	±%
Independent	Harish Chandra Durgapal	25,189	37.32%	New
BJP	Nawin Chandra Dumka	16,341	24.21%	New
INC	Harendra Singh	13,863	20.54%	New
BSP	Devki Nandan Suyal	3,719	5.51%	New
UKD	Basant Joshi	1,849	2.74%	New
Independent	Bhuwan Chandra Pokhariya	1,803	2.67%	New
Independent	Kamal Joshi	1,218	1.80%	New
CPI(ML)L	Man Singh Pal	945	1.40%	New
Independent	Prakash Joshi	654	0.97%	New
SP	Sanjay Singh	627	0.93%	New
Independent	Verenderpuri	569	0.84%	New
Margin of victory		8,848	13.11%	
Turnout		67,494	74.78%	
Registered electors		90,260		
Independent win (new seat)				

== See also ==
- List of constituencies of the Uttarakhand Legislative Assembly
- Nainital district
