= Bhagwanpur Assembly constituency =

Constituency of the Uttarakhand legislative assembly in India

Coordinates: 29.94°N 77.81°E

Bhagwanpur
- Constituency No. 28 for the Uttarakhand Legislative Assembly

Constituency details
- Country: India
- Region: North India
- State: Uttarakhand
- District: Haridwar
- Lok Sabha constituency: Haridwar
- Total electors: 123,476
- Reservation: SC

Member of Legislative Assembly
- 5th Uttarakhand Legislative Assembly
- Incumbent Mamta Rakesh
- Party: Indian National Congress
- Elected year: 2022

Bhagwanpur Legislative Assembly constituency (SC) is one of the seventy electoral Uttarakhand Legislative Assembly constituencies of Uttarakhand state in India. It includes Bhagwanpur area of Haridwar District.

Bhagwanpur Legislative Assembly constituency (SC) is a part of Haridwar (Lok Sabha constituency).

== Members of Legislative Assembly ==
Election	Name	Party
2002	Chandra Shekhar	Bharatiya Janata Party
2007	Surendra Rakesh	Bahujan Samaj Party
Major boundary changes
2012	Surendra Rakesh	Bahujan Samaj Party
2015 (By Elect)	Mamta Rakesh	Indian National Congress
2017	Mamta Rakesh	Indian National Congress
2022	Mamta Rakesh	Indian National Congress

== Election results ==
=== 2027 Assembly election ===
2027 Uttarakhand Legislative Assembly election: Bhagwanpur
Party	Candidate	Votes	%	±%
INC				
BJP				
NOTA	None of the above			
Majority				
Turnout				
gain from		Swing		

=== Assembly Election 2022 ===
2022 Uttarakhand Legislative Assembly election: Bhagwanpur
Party	Candidate	Votes	%	±%
INC	Mamta Rakesh	44,808	45.36	▼2.82
BSP	Subodh Rakesh	39,997	40.49	▲36.12
BJP	Satyapal Singh	12,067	12.22	▼33.27
ASP(KR)	Amrish Kumar	762	0.77	New
AAP	Prem Singh	678	0.69	New
Margin of victory		4,811	4.87	▲2.17
Turnout		98,783	79.91	▼0.11
Registered electors		1,23,611		▲6.19
INC hold		Swing	▼2.82	

=== Assembly Election 2017 ===
2017 Uttarakhand Legislative Assembly election: Bhagwanpur
Party	Candidate	Votes	%	±%
INC	Mamta Rakesh	44,882	48.18	▼23.23
BJP	Subodh Rakesh	42,369	45.48	▲18.57
BSP	Ram Kumar Rana	4,069	4.37	New
SP	Prempati	889	0.95	New
Margin of victory		2,513	2.70	▼41.85
Turnout		93,158	80.03	▲6.11
Registered electors		1,16,407		▲3.87
INC hold		Swing	▲0.30	

=== 2015 bypoll ===
2015 Uttarakhand Legislative Assembly by-election: Bhagwanpur
Party	Candidate	Votes	%	±%
INC	Mamta Rakesh	59,205	71.46	▲33.21
BJP	Rajpal Singh	22,296	26.91	▲13.35
NOTA	None of the above	501	0.60	New
Independent	Pritam Singh	269	0.32	New
Margin of victory		36,909	44.55	▲35.92
Turnout		82,842	73.92	▼5.80
Registered electors		112,069		▲13.72
INC gain from BSP		Swing	▲21.71	

=== Assembly Election 2012 ===
2012 Uttarakhand Legislative Assembly election: Bhagwanpur
Party	Candidate	Votes	%	±%
BSP	Surendra Rakesh	36,828	46.88	▲7.52
INC	Satyapal Singh	30,047	38.25	▲36.63
BJP	Suresh Rathor	10,650	13.56	▼19.95
LJP	Menpal	545	0.69	New
SP	Bishamber Singh	472	0.60	▼17.43
Margin of victory		6,781	8.63	▲2.77
Turnout		78,559	79.72	▲12.75
Registered electors		98,545		▼6.47
BSP hold		Swing	▲7.52	

=== Assembly Election 2007 ===
2007 Uttarakhand Legislative Assembly election: Bhagwanpur
Party	Candidate	Votes	%	±%
BSP	Surendra Rakesh	27,776	39.36	▲19.42
BJP	Chandra Shekhar	23,643	33.50	▲4.90
SP	Vaijanti Mala	12,724	18.03	▼0.13
Independent	Barkhadevi	2,987	4.23	New
INC	Dalchandra Chhachhar	1,144	1.62	▼3.20
Independent	Vijay Pal	604	0.86	New
Independent	Birendra	456	0.65	New
NBNP	Rajender Kumar	455	0.64	New
Margin of victory		4,133	5.86	▼0.18
Turnout		70,566	66.97	▲2.58
Registered electors		1,05,366		▲22.28
BSP gain from BJP		Swing	▲10.75	

=== Assembly Election 2002 ===
2002 Uttaranchal Legislative Assembly election: Bhagwanpur
Party	Candidate	Votes	%	±%
BJP	Chandra Shekhar	15,875	28.61	New
Independent	Surendra Rakesh	12,527	22.58	New
BSP	Shish Pal	11,065	19.94	New
SP	Brij Rani	10,076	18.16	New
INC	Baljeet Singh	2,673	4.82	New
JP	Saroj Singh	1,881	3.39	New
Uttarakhand Janwadi Party	Vinod Kumar Gemini	455	0.82	New
UKD	Sanjay	333	0.60	New
Independent	Dharam Singh	321	0.58	New
INLD	Surendra	282	0.51	New
Margin of victory		3,348	6.03	
Turnout		55,488	64.40	
Registered electors		86,171		
BJP win (new seat)				

== See also ==
- Haridwar (Lok Sabha constituency)
