= Mantri Prasad Naithani =

Indian politician (born 1958)

- मंत्री प्रसाद नैथानी

Cabinet Minister of Uttarakhand
- In office 2012–2017
- Governor: Aziz Qureshi; Krishan Kant Paul
- Preceded by: Harish Rawat

Uttarakhand Legislative Assembly from Devprayag
- In office 2012–2017

Personal details
- Born: 20 July 1958 (age 68) Village Kot, Po. Bajiyal Gaun, Patti Gyarah Gaun Tehri Garhwal
- Other political affiliations: Independent
- Spouse: Roshni Devi
- Children: Kavita, Monika, Depti, Tripti, Utshav
- Education: Hemwati Nandan Bahuguna Garhwal University
- Profession: Politician
- Website: www.mpnaithani.com

Mantri Prasad Naithani is an Indian politician. He is a former Educational and Minister of Water Resources in Uttarakhand, India. He was former Cabinet Minister in the cabinet of N. D. Tiwari (Former Chief Minister of Uttarakhand) in the year 2002. Again he was voted in the Devprayag Legislative election and deputed for the Cabinet Minister in Uttarakhand. The address of his Legislative area is Village Sankro (Chauraas), Vikaskhand Kirtinagar, Tehri Garhwal.

== Early life ==
Naithani was born on 20 July 1958 in family of Late Nag Dutt Naithani and Late Bhuma Devi in Village Koti, Post Banjiyaal Gaon, Patti Gyarahgaon Hindao, Vikaskhand Bhilangana, District Tehri in state Uttarakhand. He got the bachelor's degree in Arts (B.A) and then he did the bachelor's degree in Law as LLB. After getting the education he got married with Smt. Roshni Devi. At Present He is resident at R-09, Yamuna Colony In Dehradun District of Uttarakhand.

== Political career ==
Naithani's achievements and work during the political life are as the following;

1. Awareness campaign in Tehri district in order to Chipko movement in 1978. Later on march the movement with the leadership of Shri. Sunderlal Bahuguna.
2. Leadership in Jail Bharo Andolan in 1980 in order to the Tehri Dam.
3. Movement and Arresting in order to the Social Justice Movement with Late. Hemwati Nandan Bahuguna in the year 1980.
4. A 270 day’s movement in Tehri District Headquarter in 1984 for the deputation of doctors and teachers in Hospitals and Schools.
5. Arresting under the Jail Bharo Andolan and Public Movement in order to Tehri Dam in 1985.
6. Arresting, barricading, strike against Lucknow legislative, foot walk from chamoli Gopeshwar to Delhi for permanent post of the part-time 5200 teachers and 2600 doctors in the year 1986.
7. Elected through the students council in Tehri PG College in 1987.
8. Elected with huge votes from Devprayag Legislative Assembly for UP Legislative elections in 1989.
9. Movement for arresting, strike for Uttarakhand state movement in 1992.
10. Foot March from Uttarakhand to Red fort under the “Narsingh March” in Entire Uttarakhand from Narayan Ashram in Pithoragarh, provoke to the “Rampur Tiraha firing case” in 1994.
11. Leading to the six-month strike movement against the District Headquarter Tehri Garhwal district in support of the demands of Tehri Dam Migrants in the year 1996.
12. Strike in the support to the trained unemployed in Pauri Garhwal Headquarter of Garhwal Mandal in 1997.
13. Leading to the Jail Bharo Movement in order to the roads and forest act in year 1998.
14. Arresting after the stick march by police for attempting to the suicide in front of Dehradun District Headquarter in support to the unemployment in Congress Uttarakhand in 2002.
15. Nominated and elected as the cabinet minister of Uttarakhand under the cabinet of Former Chief Minister Shri. Narayan Dutt Tiwari in the year 2002 and elected with huge votes from.
16. Reelected as the cabinet minister from Devprayag Legislative election of the year 2012.
