= Kiran Mandal =

Indian politician

Kiran Mandal (Kiran Chand Mandal) (born Shaktifarm, Uttarakhand) an Indian politicianand member of the Bharatiya Janata Party. Mandal was a member of the Uttarakhand Legislative Assembly from the Sitarganj constituency in Udham Singh Nagar district.
