= Vijay Bahuguna =

6th Chief Minister of Uttarakhand

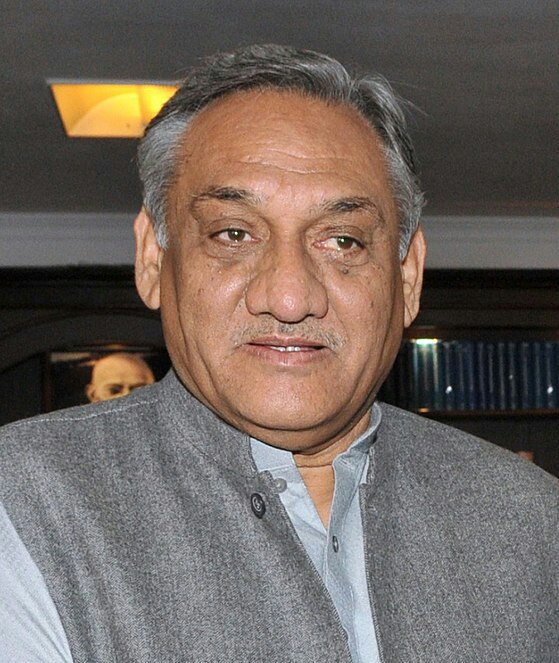

6th Chief Minister of Uttarakhand
- In office 13 March 2012 – 31 January 2014
- Preceded by: B. C. Khanduri
- Succeeded by: Harish Rawat

Member of Parliament, Lok Sabha
- In office 27 February 2007 – 23 July 2012
- Preceded by: Manabendra Shah
- Succeeded by: Mala Rajya Laxmi Shah
- Constituency: Tehri Garhwal

Judge at Bombay High Court
- In office 27 April 1994 – 15 February 1995
- Nominated by: M. N. Venkatachaliah

Judge at Allahabad High Court
- In office 27 November 1991 – 27 April 1994
- Nominated by: Kamal Narain Singh

Personal details
- Born: 28 February 1947 (age 79) Allahabad, United Provinces, British India (present-day Uttar Pradesh, India)
- Party: Bharatiya Janata Party (2016-present)
- Other political affiliations: Indian National Congress (until May 2016)
- Spouse: Sudha Bahuguna
- Relations: Rita Bahuguna (sister)
- Children: 3, including Saurabh Bahuguna (son)
- Parents: Hemwati Nandan Bahuguna (father); Kamala Bahuguna (mother)
- Education: University of Allahabad
- Profession: Judge, Advocate, politician
- Committees: Member of several committees

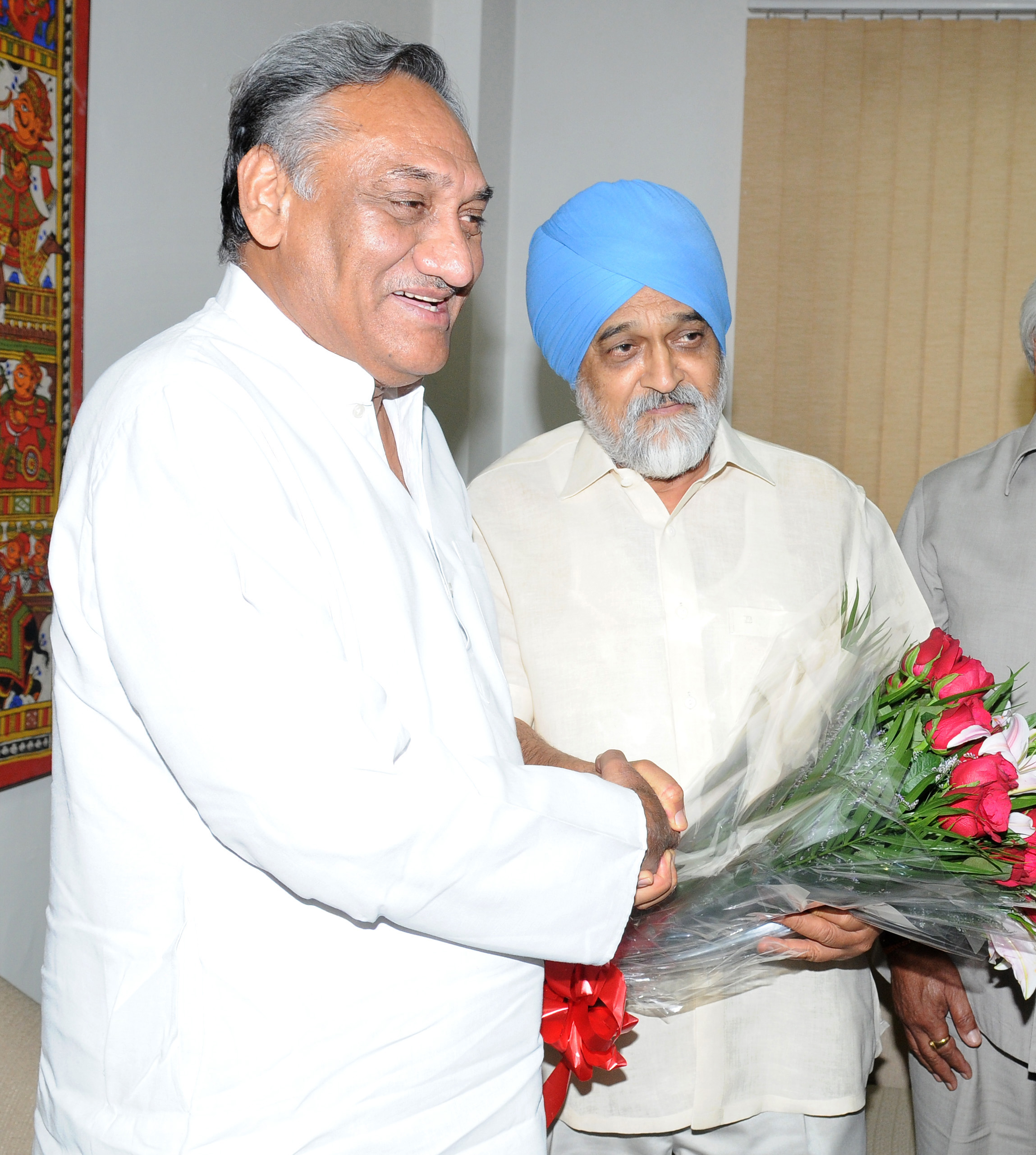
Vijay Bahuguna (left) along with Montek Singh Ahluwalia

Vijay Bahuguna (born 28 February 1947) is an Indian politician who served as the 6th Chief Minister of Uttarakhand. He is the eldest son of Hemwati Nandan Bahuguna, an independence activist and politician, and also a former Chief Minister of Uttar Pradesh. Vijay Bahuguna was a member of the 14th and 15th Lok Sabhas of India. He represented the Tehri Garhwal constituency of Uttarakhand and is a member of the Bharatiya Janata Party.

Bahuguna was sworn in as the Chief Minister of Uttarakhand on 13 March 2012. Bahuguna resigned from his CM post on 31 January 2014.

His youngest son Saurabh Bahuguna has taken forward his legacy and has won from Sitarganj ( Udham Singh Nagar), Uttarakhand Legislative Assembly. Saurabh Bahuguna from BJP won with 50597 votes.

== Family and background ==
Vijay Bahuguna was born at Allahabad in a Brahmin family. His father was Chief Minister of Uttar Pradesh & freedom fighter. H. N. Bahuguna, who had also participated in Non-Cooperation Movement. Vijay Bahuguna has a sister Rita Bahuguna who is also a politician. Rita was a former Congress leader and former president of the Uttar Pradesh Congress Committee. She joined the BJP on 20 October 2016 and was a cabinet minister in Uttar Pradesh government. His son Saurabh Bahuguna is currently serving as a cabinate minister in Uttarakhand government.

== Education and early career ==
Vijay Bahuguna did his Bachelor of Arts and then LLB from the University of Allahabad in Allahabad, Uttar Pradesh. He then started working as an advocate in the Allahabad High Court in Allahabad. He later became a judge of the Allahabad High Court, later transferring to become a judge of the Bombay High Court.

== Posts held ==
#	From	To	Position
01	2002	2007	Vice-chairman, Planning Commission, Uttarakhand
02	2007	2009	Member, 14th Lok Sabha
03	2007	2009	Member, Standing Committee on Defence
04	2008	2009	Member, Committee on Public Accounts
05	2009	2012	Member 15th Lok Sabha
06	2009	2012	Member, Committee on Health and Family Welfare
07	2009	2012	Member, Committee on Ethics
08	2009	2012	Member, Committee on Offices of Profit
09	2009	2012	Member, Consultative Committee, Ministry of Power
10	2012	2014	Chief Minister of Uttarakhand

== Resignation ==
Vijay Bahuguna had submitted his resignation as Chief Minister of Uttarakhand on 31 January 2014. His government had received widespread criticism for handling rescue operations in the wake of floods in June, 2013. Harish Rawat was sworn as Chief Minister on 1 February 2014 in presence of Governor of Uttarakhand, Aziz Qureshi.

== Other associations ==
- Member, Executive Council, Garhwal University, Uttarakhand
- President, Ranjit Pandit Shiksha Samiti; running educational colleges, Allahabad
- Vice-president, Uttarakhand Pradesh Congress since 1999
- Member, All India Congress Committee since 1997
- Ex Judge Allahabad High Court & Bombay High Court

== Elections contested ==
=== Lok Sabha ===
Year	Constituency	Result	Vote percentage	Opposition Candidate	Opposition Party	Opposition vote percentage	Ref
1998	Garhwal	Lost	12.64%	B. C. Khanduri	BJP	55.44%	
1999	Tehri Garhwal	Lost	39.75%	Manabendra Shah	BJP	43.01%	
2004	Tehri Garhwal	Lost	44.52%	Manabendra Shah	BJP	47.63%	
2007 (By Elect)	Tehri Garhwal	Won	40.61%	Manujendra Shah	BJP	38.18%	
2009	Tehri Garhwal	Won	45.04%	Jaspal Rana	BJP	35.98%	

=== Uttarakhand Legislative Assembly ===
Year	Constituency	Result	Vote percentage	Opposition Candidate	Opposition Party	Opposition vote percentage	Ref
2012 (By Elect)	Sitarganj	Won	77.14%	Prakash Pant	BJP	19.82%	

Lok Sabha
Preceded by Manabendra Shah	Member of Parliament for Tehri Garhwal; 2007–2012	Succeeded by Mala Rajya Laxmi Shah
Political offices
Preceded by B. C. Khanduri	Chief Minister of Uttarakhand; 13 March 2012 – 31 January 2014	Succeeded by Harish Rawat
