= 1996 Rajya Sabha elections =

Elections for the Upper House of Indian Parliament

Rajya Sabha elections were held in 1996, to elect members of the Rajya Sabha, Indian Parliament's upper house. 59 members from 17 states, 1 member from Mizoram State, and 15 members from 3 states of JK, UK and UP were elected.

== Elections ==
Elections were held in 1996 to elect members from various states. The list is incomplete.

=== Members elected ===
The following members are elected in the elections held in 1996. They are members for the term 1996-2002 and retire in year 2002, except in case of the resignation or death before the term.

State - Member - Party

Rajya Sabha members for term 1996-2002
State	Member Name	Party	Remark
Maharashtra	Suresh A Keswani	IND	R
Maharashtra	Vedprakash P. Goyal	BJP	
Maharashtra	Shankarrao Chavan	INC	
Maharashtra	Mukeshbhai R Patel	SS	
Maharashtra	Suryabhan Raghunath Patil Vahadane	BJP	
Maharashtra	Adhik Shirolkar	SS	
Maharashtra	N.K.P. Salve	INC	
Orissa	Jayanti Patnaik	INC	Res 03/03/1998 LS
Orissa	Ananta Sethi	INC	
Orissa	Frida Topno	INC	
Orissa	Maurice Kujur	INC	
Orissa	Dilip Kumar Ray	BJD	
Tamil Nadu	S Peter Alphonse	INC	Res 09/09/1997
Tamil Nadu	S Peter Alphonse	TMC	fr 10/10/1997
Tamil Nadu	N Shiva	DMK	
Tamil Nadu	R. Subbian	DMK	
Tamil Nadu	P. Soundararajan	AIADMK	
Tamil Nadu	xxx	AIADMK	18.5.2001
Tamil Nadu	S. Niraikulathan	AIADMK	
Tamil Nadu	R K Kumar	AIADMK	dea 03/10/1999
Tamil Nadu	N Thalavi Sundaram	AIADMK	
Tamil Nadu	T M Venkatachalam	AIADMK	dea 02/12/1999
West Bengal	Dawa Lama	CPM	
West Bengal	Bratin Sengupta	CPM	
West Bengal	Prof Bharati Ray	CPM	
West Bengal	Md. Salim	CPM	res 25.5.2001
West Bengal	Debabrata Biswas	AIFB	
Andhra Pradesh	Nahata Jayaprada	TDP	
Andhra Pradesh	Dr Yelamanchili Radhakrishna Murthy	CPM	
Andhra Pradesh	Yarlagadda Lakshmi Prasad	TDP	
Andhra Pradesh	K M Saifullah	TDP	
Andhra Pradesh	Solipeta Ramachandra Reddy	TDP	
Andhra Pradesh	Daggubati Venkateswar Rao	TDP(NTR)	
Assam	Karnendu Bhattacharjee	INC	
Assam	Basanti Sarma	INC	
Assam	Prakanta Warisa	ASDC	
Bihar	Nagendra Nath Ojha	CPI	
Bihar	Prem Chand Gupta	JD	
Bihar	Jagdambi Mandal	JD	dea 13/01/2000
Bihar	Ranjan Prasad Yadav	RJD	
Bihar	Shatrughan Prasad Sinha	BJP	
Bihar	Ram Deo Bhandari	RJD	
Bihar	Gyan Ranjan	INC	dea 22/04/1998
Chhattisgarh	Lakhiram Agrawal	BJP	fr 01/11/2000
Chhattisgarh	Surendra Kumar Singh	INC	fr 01/11/2000
Gujarat	Anantray Devshanker Dave	BJP	
Gujarat	Laxmanji Bangaru Narsimha	BJP	
Gujarat	Gopalsinhji Gulabsinhji	BJP	
Gujarat	Brahmkumar Ranchhodlal Bhatt	INC	
Haryana	Banarasi Das Gupta	INC	
Haryana	Lachhman Singh	INC	
Himachal Pradesh	Chandresh Kumari	INC	
Jharkhand	Obaidullah Khan Azmi	JD	
Jharkhand	Ven Dhamma Viriyo	RJD	
Karnataka	H. D. Deve Gowda	JD	bye 23/09/1996 res 1998 LS
Karnataka	Leeladevi Renuka Prasad	JD	22/04/1996
Karnataka	C. M. Ibrahim	JD	
Karnataka	Ramakrishna Hegde	JD	
Karnataka	A. Lakshmisagar	JD	
Karnataka	S M Krishna	INC	Res 14/10/1999
Karnataka	K. C. Kondaiah	INC	bye 14/01/2000
Madhya Pradesh	A G Qureshi	INC	
Madhya Pradesh	Suresh Pachouri	INC	
Madhya Pradesh	Sikandar Bakht	BJP	
Madhya Pradesh	Lakhiram Agrawal	BJP	till 31/10/2000
Madhya Pradesh	Surendra Kumar Singh	INC	till 31/10/2000
Rajashthan	K.K. Birla	INC	
Rajashthan	Ramdas Agarwal	BJP	
Rajashthan	Dr Mahesh Chandra Sharma	BJP	
Meghalaya	Onward L Nongtdu	INC	
Arunachal Pradesh	Nabam Rebia	IND	
Mizoram	Hiphei	INC	
Jammu and Kashmir	Prof Saifuddin Soz	JKNC	res 10/03/1998 LS
Jammu and Kashmir	Kushok Nawang Chamba Stanzin	JKNC	Bye Apr 98
Jammu and Kashmir	Sharief-ud-Din Shariq	JKNC	
Jammu and Kashmir	Ghulam Nabi Azad	INC	
Jammu and Kashmir	Mirza Abdul Rashid	--	
UP	Akhilesh Das	BSP	
UP	Sunil Shastri	INC	
UP	Amar Singh	SP	
UP	Chunni Lal Chowdhary	BJP	dea 03/12/2000
UP	Shyam Lal	BJP	fr 16/02/2001
UP	Devi Prasad Singh	BJP	
UP	Gandhi Azad	BSP	
UP	R. N. Arya	BSP	
UP	Narendra Mohan	BJP	dea 20/09/2002
UP	Rajnath Singh Surya	BJP	
UP	Balwant Singh Ramoowalia	SAD	
UP	Azam Khan	SP	res 09/03/2002
UP	Manohar Kant Dhyani	BJP	from UP till 08/11/2000
Uttarakhand	Manohar Kant Dhyani	BJP	from UK onwards 09/11/2000
Manipur	W. Angou Singh	INC	

== Bye-elections ==
The following bye elections were held in the year 1996.

State - Member - Party

1. HR - K L Poswal - INC ( ele 13/02/1996 term till 1998 )
2. MH - Prof Ram Kapse - BJP ( ele 27/09/1996 term till 1998 )
3. MH - Sanjay Nirupam - SS ( ele 27/09/1996 term till 2000 )
4. UP - Dara Singh Chauhan - BSP ( ele 30/11/1996 term till 2000 ) res of Mayawati
5. UP - Khan Ghufran Zahidi - INC ( ele 30/11/1996 term till 1998 )
6. UP - Ahmad Wasim - INC ( ele 30/11/1996 term till 1998 )
7. Tamil Nadu - V.K. Duraisamy - DMK ( ele 26/11/1996 term till 2001 ) res of V.K. Duraisamy fr AIADMK
8. GJ - Yoginder K Alagh - IND ( ele 26/11/1996 term till 2000 ) res of
