= Almora Lok Sabha constituency =

Lok Sabha constituency in Uttarakhand

Coordinates: 29.6°N 79.6°E

Almora UK-3
- Lok Sabha constituency
- Interactive Map Outlining Almora Lok Sabha constituency

Constituency details
- Country: India
- Region: North India
- State: Uttarakhand
- Assembly constituencies: 14: Dharchula, Didihat, Pithoragarh, Gangolihat, Kapkot, Bageshwar, Dwarahat, Salt, Ranikhet, Someshwar, Almora, Jageshwar, Lohaghat and Champawat
- Established: 1951
- Total electors: 13,39,327
- Reservation: SC

Member of Parliament
- 18th Lok Sabha
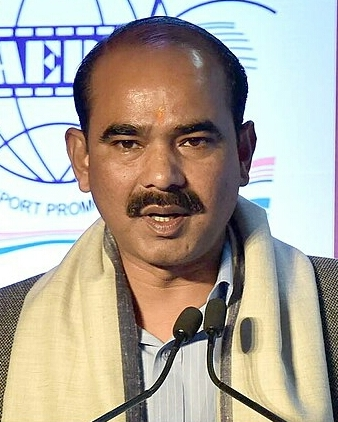
- Incumbent Ajay Tamta
- Party: BJP
- Alliance: NDA
- Elected year: 2024

Almora Lok Sabha constituency is one of the five Lok Sabha (parliamentary) constituencies in Uttarakhand. This constituency came into existence in 1952, following the delimitation of Lok Sabha constituencies. It comprises four districts namely Almora, Bageshwar, Champawat and Pithoragarh. Since 2009, this constituency is reserved for the Scheduled Caste candidates.

== Assembly segments ==
After the formation of Uttarakhand

At present, Almora Lok Sabha constituency comprises the following fourteen Vidhan Sabha (legislative assembly) constituency segments of Uttarakhand:

#	Name	District	Member	Party	Leading (in 2024)
42	Dharchula	Pithoragarh	Harish Singh Dhami	INC	BJP
43	Didihat	Pithoragarh	Bishan Singh Chuphal	BJP	BJP
44	Pithoragarh	Pithoragarh	Mayukh Mahar	INC	BJP
45	Gangolihat (SC)	Pithoragarh	Fakir Ram Tamta	BJP	BJP
46	Kapkot	Bageshwar	Suresh Singh Gariya	BJP	BJP
47	Bageshwar (SC)	Bageshwar	Parwati Das	BJP	BJP
48	Dwarahat	Almora	Madan Singh Bisht	INC	BJP
49	Salt	Almora	Mahesh Singh Jeena	BJP	BJP
50	Ranikhet	Almora	Pramod Nainwal	BJP	BJP
51	Someshwar (SC)	Almora	Rekha Arya	BJP	BJP
52	Almora	Almora	Manoj Tiwari	INC	BJP
53	Jageshwar	Almora	Mohan Singh Mahara	BJP	BJP
54	Lohaghat	Champawat	Khushal Singh Adhikari	INC	BJP
55	Champawat	Champawat	Pushkar Singh Dhami	BJP	BJP

Before the formation of Uttarakhand

Almora Lok Sabha constituency comprised the following five Vidhan Sabha (legislative assembly) constituency segments of Uttar Pradesh:

District	Assembly constituency segments	
District	Name	SC/ST
Almora
Almora	Almora	
Almora	Ranikhet	
Bageshwar	Bageshwar	SC
Pithoragarh
Pithoragarh	Didihat	
Pithoragarh	Pithoragarh	

== Members of Parliament ==
Year	Member	Party
1952	Devi Datt Pant	Indian National Congress
1955^	Badri Datt Pandey	Indian National Congress
1957	Hargovind Pant	Indian National Congress
1957^	Jang Bahadur Singh Bisht	Indian National Congress
1962	Jang Bahadur Singh Bisht	Indian National Congress
1967	Jang Bahadur Singh Bisht	Indian National Congress
1971	Narendra Singh Bisht	Indian National Congress
1977	Murli Manohar Joshi	Janata Party
1980	Harish Rawat	Indian National Congress
1984	Harish Rawat	Indian National Congress
1989	Harish Rawat	Indian National Congress
1991	Jeewan Sharma	Bharatiya Janata Party
1996	Bachi Singh Rawat	Bharatiya Janata Party
1998	Bachi Singh Rawat	Bharatiya Janata Party
1999	Bachi Singh Rawat	Bharatiya Janata Party
2004	Bachi Singh Rawat	Bharatiya Janata Party
2009	Pradeep Tamta	Indian National Congress
2014	Ajay Tamta	Bharatiya Janata Party
2019	Ajay Tamta	Bharatiya Janata Party
2024	Ajay Tamta	Bharatiya Janata Party

^By-election

== Election results ==
=== 2024 ===
2024 Indian general election: Almora
Party	Candidate	Votes	%	±%
BJP	Ajay Tamta	429,167	64.20	▲0.17
INC	Pradeep Tamta	1,95,070	29.18	▼1.30
NOTA	None of the above	17,019	2.55	▲0.27
Majority		2,34,097	35.02	▲1.47
Turnout		6,75,014	49.33	▼2.98
BJP hold		Swing	▲0.17	

=== General Elections, 2019 ===
2019 Indian general elections: Almora
Party	Candidate	Votes	%	±%
BJP	Ajay Tamta	444,651	64.03	▲11.03
INC	Pradeep Tamta	2,11,665	30.48	▼7.96
NOTA	None of the above	15,505	2.23	▼0.09
Margin of victory		2,32,986	33.55	▲18.99
Turnout		6,99,807	52.31	▼0.06
BJP hold		Swing	▲1.04	

=== General Elections, 2014 ===
2014 Indian general elections: Almora
Party	Candidate	Votes	%	±%
BJP	Ajay Tamta	348,186	53.00	▲12.67
INC	Pradeep Tamta	2,52,496	38.44	▼3.33
NOTA	None of the above	15,245	2.32	N/A
Margin of victory		95,690	14.56	▲12.68
Turnout		6,56,525	52.37	▲6.51
BJP gain from INC		Swing	▲11.00	

=== General Elections, 2009 ===
2009 Indian general elections: Almora
Party	Candidate	Votes	%	±%
INC	Pradeep Tamta	202,228	41.70	▼0.99
BJP	Ajay Tamta	1,95,705	40.36	▼4.32
BSP	Bahadur Ram Dhauni	45,143	9.31	New
Margin of victory		6,523	1.34	▼0.65
Turnout		4,84,920	45.86	▼6.51
INC gain from BJP		Swing	▼0.99	

=== General Elections, 2004 ===
2004 Indian general elections: Almora
Party	Candidate	Votes	%	±%
BJP	Bachi Singh Rawat	225,742	44.68	
INC	Renuka Rawat	2,15,690	42.69	
UKD	Kashi Singh Airy	27,340	5.41	
Margin of victory		10,052	1.99	
Turnout		5,05,223	52.37	49.89
BJP hold		Swing		

== See also ==
- List of constituencies of the Lok Sabha
- List of parliamentary constituencies in Uttarakhand
