= 2014 elections in India =

Elections in India
- 2014

The elections in India in 2014 include the Indian general election of 2014 and eight state legislative assembly elections. The tenure of the state legislative assemblies of Andhra Pradesh, Arunachal Pradesh, Haryana, Jammu and Kashmir, Maharashtra, Jharkhand, Odisha and Sikkim are due to expire during the year.

== General election ==
The voting for the general elections started from 7 April 2014, and the results were announced on 16 May 2014. According to the Election Commission of India, the electoral strength in 2014 was 81.45 crores, the largest in the world.

Date*	Election	Government before	Prime Minister before election	Government after	Elected Prime Minister
7 April 2014 – 12 May 2014	Lok Sabha	United Progressive Alliance	Manmohan Singh	National Democratic Alliance	Narendra Modi

== Parliamentary By-election ==
S.No	Date	Constituency	MP before election	Party before election	Elected MP	Party after election
1	13 September 2014	Vadodara	Narendra Modi	Bharatiya Janata Party	Ranjanben Bhatt	Bharatiya Janata Party
2	13 September 2014	Medak	K. Chandrashekar Rao	Telangana Rashtra Samithi	Kotha Prabhakar Reddy	Telangana Rashtra Samithi
3	13 September 2014	Mainpuri	Mulayam Singh Yadav	Samajwadi Party	Tej Pratap Singh Yadav	Samajwadi Party
4	15 October 2014	Beed	Gopinath Munde	Bharatiya Janata Party	Pritam Munde	Bharatiya Janata Party
5	15 October 2014	Kandhamal	Hemendra Chandra Singh	Biju Janata Dal	Pratyusha Rajeshwari Singh	Biju Janata Dal

== Legislative Assembly elections ==
Date(s)	State	Government before	Chief Minister before	Government after	Elected Chief Minister	Maps
19 April 2014	Arunachal Pradesh	Indian National Congress	Nabam Tuki	Indian National Congress	Nabam Tuki	
10 April – 17 April 2014	Odisha	Biju Janata Dal	Naveen Patnaik	Biju Janata Dal	Naveen Patnaik	
12 April 2014	Sikkim	Sikkim Democratic Front	Pawan Kumar Chamling	Sikkim Democratic Front	Pawan Kumar Chamling	
30 April-7 May 2014	Andhra Pradesh	Indian National Congress	Kiran Kumar Reddy	Telugu Desam Party	N. Chandrababu Naidu	
30 April-7 May 2014	Telangana	Part of United Andhra Pradesh		Telangana Rashtra Samithi	K. Chandrashekar Rao	
15 October 2014	Maharashtra	Indian National Congress	Prithviraj Chavan	Bharatiya Janata Party	Devendra Fadnavis	
15 October 2014	Maharashtra	Nationalist Congress Party	Prithviraj Chavan	Shiv Sena	Devendra Fadnavis	
15 October 2014	Haryana	Indian National Congress	Bhupinder Singh Hooda	Bharatiya Janata Party	Manohar Lal Khattar	
20 November – 20 December 2014	Jammu and Kashmir	Jammu & Kashmir National Conference	Omar Abdullah	Jammu and Kashmir People's Democratic Party	Mufti Mohammad Sayeed	
20 November – 20 December 2014	Jammu and Kashmir	Indian National Congress	Omar Abdullah	Bharatiya Janata Party	Mufti Mohammad Sayeed	
20 November – 20 December 2014	Jharkhand	Jharkhand Mukti Morcha	Hemant Soren	Bharatiya Janata Party	Raghubar Das	
20 November – 20 December 2014	Jharkhand	Indian National Congress	Hemant Soren	All Jharkhand Students Union	Raghubar Das	

== Assembly By-elections ==
=== Andhra Pradesh ===
S.No	Date	Constituency	MLA before election	Party before election	Elected MLA	Party after election
1	13 September 2014	Nandigama	Thangirala Prabhakara Rao	Telugu Desam Party	Tangirala Sowmya	Telugu Desam Party
2	8 November 2014	Allagadda	Shobha Nagi Reddy	YSR Congress Party	Akhila Priya Reddy	YSR Congress Party

=== Arunachal Pradesh ===
S.No	Date	Constituency	MLA before election	Party before election	Elected MLA	Party after election
1	15 October 2014	Kanubari	Newlai Tingkhatra	Indian National Congress	Gabriel Denwang Wangsu	Indian National Congress

=== Assam ===
S.No	Date	Constituency	MLA before election	Party before election	Elected MLA	Party after election
1	13 September 2014	Silchar	Sushmita Dev	Indian National Congress	Dilip Kumar Paul	Bharatiya Janata Party
2	13 September 2014	Lakhipur	Dinesh Prasad Goala	Indian National Congress	Rajdeep Goala	Indian National Congress
3	13 September 2014	Jamunamukh	Sirajuddin Ajmal	All India United Democratic Front	Abdur Rahim Ajmal	All India United Democratic Front

=== Bihar ===
S.No	Date	Constituency	MLA before election	Party before election	Elected MLA	Party after election
1	21 August 2014	Bhagalpur	Ashwini Kumar Choubey	Bharatiya Janata Party	Ajeet Sharma	Indian National Congress
2	21 August 2014	Jale	Vijay Kumar Mishra	Bharatiya Janata Party	Rishi Mishra	Janata Dal (United)
3	21 August 2014	Mohiuddinnagar	Rana Gangeshwar Singh	Bharatiya Janata Party	Ajay Kumar Bulganin	Rashtriya Janata Dal
4	21 August 2014	Chapra	Janardan Singh Sigriwal	Bharatiya Janata Party	Randhir Kumar Singh	Rashtriya Janata Dal
5	21 August 2014	Hajipur	Nityanand Roy	Bharatiya Janata Party	Awadhesh Singh	Bharatiya Janata Party
6	21 August 2014	Narkatiaganj	Satish Chandra Dubey	Bharatiya Janata Party	Rashmi Verma	Bharatiya Janata Party
7	21 August 2014	Mohania	Chhedi Paswan	Janata Dal (United)	Niranjan Ram	Bharatiya Janata Party
8	21 August 2014	Banka	Javed Iqbal Ansari	Rashtriya Janata Dal	Ramnarayan Mandal	Bharatiya Janata Party
9	21 August 2014	Parbatta	Samrat Choudhary	Rashtriya Janata Dal	Ramanand Prasad Singh	Janata Dal (United)
10	21 August 2014	Rajnagar	Ram Lakhan Ram Raman	Rashtriya Janata Dal	Rama Watar Paswan	Rashtriya Janata Dal

=== Chhattisgarh ===
S.No	Date	Constituency	MLA before election	Party before election	Elected MLA	Party after election
1	13 September 2014	Antagarh	Vikram Usendi	Bharatiya Janata Party	Bhoj Raj Nag	Bharatiya Janata Party

=== Gujarat ===
S.No	Date	Constituency	MLA before election	Party before election	Elected MLA	Party after election
1	13 September 2014	Deesa	Liladhar Vaghela	Bharatiya Janata Party	Govabhai Hamirabhai Rabari	Indian National Congress
2	13 September 2014	Khambhaliya	Poonamben Maadam	Bharatiya Janata Party	Ahir Meraman Markhi	Indian National Congress
3	13 September 2014	Mangrol (Junagadh)	Rajesh Chudasama	Bharatiya Janata Party	Vaja Babubhai Kalabhai	Indian National Congress
4	13 September 2014	Maninagar	Narendra Modi	Bharatiya Janata Party	Sureshbhai Patel	Bharatiya Janata Party
5	13 September 2014	Tankara	Mohanbhai Kundariya	Bharatiya Janata Party	Bavanjibhai Hansrajbhai Metaliya	Bharatiya Janata Party
6	13 September 2014	Talaja	Bharatiben Shyal	Bharatiya Janata Party	Gohil Shivabhai Jerambhai	Bharatiya Janata Party
7	13 September 2014	Anand	Dilip Patel	Bharatiya Janata Party	Rohit Patel	Bharatiya Janata Party
8	13 September 2014	Matar	Devusinh Chauhan	Bharatiya Janata Party	Kesarisinh Solanki	Bharatiya Janata Party
9	13 September 2014	Limkheda	Jaswantsinh Bhabhor	Bharatiya Janata Party	Bhuriya Vichhiyabhai Jokhnabhai	Bharatiya Janata Party
10	15 October 2014	Rajkot West	Vajubhai Vala	Bharatiya Janata Party	Vijay Rupani	Bharatiya Janata Party

=== Himachal Pradesh ===
2014 Himachal Pradesh Legislative Assembly by-election: Sujanpur
Party	Candidate	Votes	%	±%
BJP	Narinder Thakur	22,993	49.78%	▲30.14
INC	Anita Kumari Rana	22,455	48.62%	▲25.30
BSP	Parveen Thakur	387	0.84%	▲0.27
Independent	Subhash Chand	352	0.76%	New
NOTA	Nota	351	0.76%	New
Margin of victory		538	1.16%	▼30.26
Turnout		46,187	100.00%	▲29.65
Registered electors		46,659		▼28.22
BJP gain from Independent		Swing	▼4.96	

=== Karnataka ===
S.No	Date	Constituency	MLA before election	Party before election	Elected MLA	Party after election
1	21 August 2014	Chikkodi-Sadalga	Prakash Babanna Hukkeri	Indian National Congress	Ganesh Prakash Hukkeri	Indian National Congress
2	21 August 2014	Bellary Rural	B. Sriramulu	Badavara Shramikara Raitara Congress	NY Gopalkrishna	Indian National Congress
3	21 August 2014	Shikaripura	B. S. Yeddyurappa	Karnataka Janata Paksha	B. Y. Raghavendra	Bharatiya Janata Party

=== Madhya Pradesh ===
S.No	Date	Constituency	MLA before election	Party before election	Elected MLA	Party after election
1	24 April 2014	Vidisha	Shivraj Singh Chouhan	Bharatiya Janata Party	Kalyan Singh Thakur	Bharatiya Janata Party
2	21 August 2014	Bahoriband	Prabhat Pandey	Bharatiya Janata Party	Saurabh Singh	Indian National Congress
3	21 August 2014	Agar	Manohar Untwal	Bharatiya Janata Party	Gopal Parmar	Bharatiya Janata Party
4	21 August 2014	Vijayraghavgarh	Sanjay Pathak	Indian National Congress	Sanjay Pathak	Bharatiya Janata Party

=== Manipur ===
S.No	Date	Constituency	MLA before election	Party before election	Elected MLA	Party after election
1	17 October 2014	Hiyanglam	Maibam Kunjo	All India Trinamool Congress	Elangbam Dwijamani	Indian National Congress

=== Nagaland ===
S.No	Date	Constituency	MLA before election	Party before election	Elected MLA	Party after election
1	15 October 2014	Northern Angami-II	Neiphiu Rio	Naga People's Front	Dr. Neiphrezo Keditsu	Naga People's Front

=== Punjab ===
S.No	Date	Constituency	MLA before election	Party before election	Elected MLA	Party after election
1	21 August 2014	Patiala Urban	Amarinder Singh	Indian National Congress	Preneet Kaur	Indian National Congress
2	21 August 2014	Talwandi Sabo	Jeetmohinder Singh Sidhu	Indian National Congress	Jeetmohinder Singh Sidhu	Shiromani Akali Dal

=== Rajasthan ===
S.No	Date	Constituency	MLA before election	Party before election	Elected MLA	Party after election
1	13 September 2014	Nasirabad	Sanwar Lal Jat	Bharatiya Janata Party	Ramnaryan	Indian National Congress
2	13 September 2014	Surajgarh	Santosh Ahlawat	Bharatiya Janata Party	Sharwan Kumar	Indian National Congress
3	13 September 2014	Weir	Bahadur Singh Koli	Bharatiya Janata Party	Bhajan Lal Jatav	Indian National Congress
4	13 September 2014	Kota South	Om Birla	Bharatiya Janata Party	Sandeep Sharma	Bharatiya Janata Party

=== Sikkim ===
S.No	Date	Constituency	MLA before election	Party before election	Elected MLA	Party after election
1	13 September 2014	Rangang-Yangang	Pawan Kumar Chamling	Sikkim Democratic Front	Rup Narayan Chamling	Independent

=== Tripura ===
S.No	Date	Constituency	MLA before election	Party before election	Elected MLA	Party after election
1	13 September 2014	Manu	Jitendra Choudhury	Communist Party of India (Marxist)	Prabhat Chowdhury	Communist Party of India (Marxist)

=== Uttar Pradesh ===
S.No	Date	Constituency	MLA before election	Party before election	Elected MLA	Party after election
1	13 September 2014	Saharanpur Nagar	Raghav Lakhanpal	Bharatiya Janata Party	Rajiv Gumber	Bharatiya Janata Party
2	13 September 2014	Noida	Mahesh Sharma	Bharatiya Janata Party	Vimla Batham	Bharatiya Janata Party
3	13 September 2014	Lucknow East	Kalraj Mishra	Bharatiya Janata Party	Ashutosh Tandon	Bharatiya Janata Party
4	13 September 2014	Bijnor	Kunwar Bhartendra Singh	Bharatiya Janata Party	Ruchi Veera	Samajwadi Party
5	13 September 2014	Thakurdwara	Kunwar Sarvesh Kumar Singh	Bharatiya Janata Party	Nawab Jan	Samajwadi Party
6	13 September 2014	Nighasan	Ajay Kumar Mishra	Bharatiya Janata Party	Krishna Gopal Patel	Samajwadi Party
7	13 September 2014	Hamirpur	Sadhvi Niranjan Jyoti	Bharatiya Janata Party	Shiv Charan Prajapati	Samajwadi Party
8	13 September 2014	Charkhari	Uma Bharti	Bharatiya Janata Party	Kaptan Singh	Samajwadi Party
9	13 September 2014	Sirathu	Keshav Prasad Maurya	Bharatiya Janata Party	Wachaspati	Samajwadi Party
10	13 September 2014	Balha	Savitri Bai Phule	Bharatiya Janata Party	Banshidhar Baudh	Samajwadi Party
11	13 September 2014	Rohaniya	Anupriya Singh Patel	Apna Dal	Mahendra Singh Patel	Samajwadi Party
12	15 October 2014	Kairana	Hukum Singh	Bharatiya Janata Party	Nahid Hasan	Samajwadi Party

=== Uttarakhand ===
S.No	Date	Constituency	MLA before election	Party before election	Elected MLA	Party after election
1	21 July 2014	Doiwala	Ramesh Pokhriyal	Bharatiya Janata Party	Hira Singh Bisht	Indian National Congress
2	21 July 2014	Someshwar	Ajay Tamta	Bharatiya Janata Party	Rekha Arya	Indian National Congress
3	21 July 2014	Dharchula	Harish Singh Dhami	Indian National Congress	Harish Rawat	Indian National Congress

=== West Bengal ===
S.No	Date	Constituency	MLA before election	Party before election	Elected MLA	Party after election
1	17 April 2014	Maynaguri	Ananta Deb Adhikari	Revolutionary Socialist Party (India)	Ananta Deb Adhikari	All India Trinamool Congress
2	13 September 2014	Basirhat Dakshin	Narayan Mukherjee	Communist Party of India (Marxist)	Samik Bhattacharya	Bharatiya Janata Party
3	13 September 2014	Chowrangee	Sikha Mitra	All India Trinamool Congress	Nayna Bandopadhyay	All India Trinamool Congress

== See also ==
- V. S. Sampath
