= List of Rajya Sabha members from Uttarakhand =

The Rajya Sabha (meaning the "Council of States") is the upper house of the Parliament of India. Uttarakhand state elects three members and they are indirectly elected by the members of Uttarakhand Legislative Assembly. Members are elected for six years and one-third of members are retired after every two years. The number of seats allocated to the party, are determined by the number of seats a party possesses during nomination and the party nominates a member to be voted on. Elections within the state legislatures are held using single transferable voting with proportional representation.

== Current members ==
Keys:

BJP (3)
Source: Parliament of India (Rajya Sabha)

#	Name	Party	Date of appointment	Date of retirement	Election
1	Naresh Bansal	Bharatiya Janata Party	26 November 2020	25 November 2026	2020
2	Kalpana Saini	Bharatiya Janata Party	5 July 2022	4 July 2028	2022
3	Mahendra Bhatt	Bharatiya Janata Party	3 April 2024	2 April 2030	2024

== List of all Rajya Sabha members from Uttarakhand ==
This is the list of all Rajya Sabha members from Uttarakhand in chronological order.
Keys: BJP INC
Source: Parliament of India (Rajya Sabha)

No.	Name	Portrait	Party	Term	Date of appointment	Date of retirement	Election	Notes
1	Manohar Kant Dhyani		Bharatiya Janata Party	1	26 November 1996	25 November 2002	1996	Elected as the Rajya Sabha members from Uttar Pradesh. Continued the term as the Rajya Sabha members from Uttarakhand onwards 9 November 2000.
2	Sangh Priya Gautam		Bharatiya Janata Party	1	5 July 1998	4 July 2004	1998	Elected as the Rajya Sabha members from Uttar Pradesh. Continued the term as the Rajya Sabha members from Uttarakhand onwards 9 November 2000.
3	Sushma Swaraj		Bharatiya Janata Party	1	3 April 2000	2 April 2006	2000	Elected as the Rajya Sabha members from Uttar Pradesh. Continued the term as the Rajya Sabha members from Uttarakhand onwards 9 November 2000.
4	Harish Rawat		Indian National Congress	1	26 November 2002	25 November 2008	2002	
5	Satish Sharma		Indian National Congress	1	5 July 2004	4 July 2010	2004	
6	Satyavrat Chaturvedi		Indian National Congress	1	3 April 2006	2 April 2012	2006	
7	Bhagat Singh Koshyari		Bharatiya Janata Party	1	26 November 2008	16 May 2014	2008	Resigned due to his election to the 16th Lok Sabha.
8	Tarun Vijay		Bharatiya Janata Party	1	5 July 2010	4 July 2016	2010	
9	Mahendra Singh Mahra		Indian National Congress	1	3 April 2012	2 April 2018	2012	
10	Manorama Dobriyal Sharma		Indian National Congress	1	26 November 2014	18 February 2015	2014	Died in office 18 February 2015
11	Raj Babbar		Indian National Congress	1	14 March 2015	25 November 2020	2015	Elected in the by-election.
12	Pradeep Tamta		Indian National Congress	1	5 July 2016	4 July 2022	2016	
13	Anil Baluni		Bharatiya Janata Party	1	3 April 2018	2 April 2024	2018	
14	Naresh Bansal		Bharatiya Janata Party	1	26 November 2020	25 November 2026	2020	
15	Kalpana Saini		Bharatiya Janata Party	1	5 July 2022	4 July 2028	2022	
16	Mahendra Bhatt		Bharatiya Janata Party	1	3 April 2024	2 April 2030	2024	

== See also ==
- List of Lok Sabha members from Uttarakhand
- List of parliamentary constituencies in Uttarakhand
