= Naresh Bansal =

Indian politician

Member of Parliament, Rajya Sabha
- Incumbent
- Assumed office 25 November 2020
- Preceded by: Raj Babbar
- Constituency: Uttrakhand

General Secretary (Organisation), Bharatiya Janata Party, Uttarakhand
- In office 2002–2009
- President: Manohar Kant Dhyani; Bhagat Singh Koshyari; Bachi Singh Rawat

Personal details
- Born: 1955 (age 70–71) Dehradun, Uttar Pradesh (now Uttarakhand)
- Party: Bharatiya Janata Party
- Children: 3
- Education: M.Com
- Alma mater: DAV College
- Occupation: Banker, Politician

Naresh Bansal is an Indian politician and Member of Parliament from Uttarakhand in the Rajya Sabha. He is a member of the Bharatiya Janata Party. He is a former General Secretary (Organisation) of Bharatiya Janata Party, Uttarakhand and also previously served as its interim president. As of 2020, he has been involved with party activities for over four decades.

== Political career ==
Naresh Bansal joined the Rashtriya Swayamsevak Sangh (RSS), a Hindu nationalist organisation, at the age of eight, and remains an active member. Bansal has held a variety of positions with RSS. Between 1972 and 1974, he was the city treasurer of the RSS student council. In 2020, it was reported that he had headed the RSS’s disaster management panel for over 20 years.

In 1977 Bansal was elected as district coordinator of student organization Akhil Bharatiya Vidyarthi Parishad (ABVP). He was also part of the Hindu Jagran Manch from 1980 to 1986.

He worked at the government for some time before leaving to join the Bharatiya Janata Party. From 2002 to 2009, Bansal was the state general secretary (organisation) of the Bharatiya Janata Party, Uttarakhand, and served as its interim president. Prior to his election to the Rajya Sabha, Bansal was the vice-chairman of the state-level 20-point programme implementation committee.

In 2012 Bansal was selected as a Rajya Sabha candidate for BJP, ticket but later withdrew. On 2 November 2020 he was elected unopposed from Uttarakhand.

== Political positions held ==
- 2002 - 2009: General Secretary (Organisation), Uttarakhand BJP
- 2002 - 2009 : National Executive member BJP India.
- 2009 - 2012: Chairman Housing and Development Council, Uttarakhand
- 2012 - 2019 General secretary, Uttarakhand BJP
- 2019 - 2020 oct 27 : Vice Chairman of the state-level 20-point programme implementation committee
- 2020 - Till Date: Member of Parliament, Rajya Sabha from Uttarakhand state.
