= Keswani =

Keswani is a surname. Notable people with the surname include:

- Patu Keswani (born 1959), chairman and managing director of Lemon Tree Hotels
- Rajkumar Keswani (1950–2021), senior journalist
- Suresh Keswani (born 1942), Indian politician
- Sweta Keswani, Indian actress, dancer and model
