= Dharchula Assembly constituency =

Constituency of the Uttarakhand legislative assembly in India

Coordinates: 29.85°N 80.54°E

Dharchula
- Constituency No. 42 for the Uttarakhand Legislative Assembly

Constituency details
- Country: India
- Region: North India
- State: Uttarakhand
- District: Pithoragarh
- Lok Sabha constituency: Almora
- Established: 2002
- Total electors: 87,747 (2022)
- Reservation: None

Member of Legislative Assembly
- 5th Uttarakhand Legislative Assembly
- Incumbent Harish Singh Dhami
- Party: Indian National Congress
- Elected year: 2022

INC is the most successful political party in Dharchula assembly constituency.
1. INC (4 terms) (66.7%)
2. IND (2 terms) (33.3%)

Dharchula Legislative Assembly constituency is one of the seventy electoral Uttarakhand Legislative Assembly constituencies of Uttarakhand state in India. It includes Dharchula area of Pithoragarh District. At 5,592.15 square kilometers, it officially ranks as the largest assembly constituency by area in the entire state of Uttarakhand and one of the largest in India.

Dharchula Legislative Assembly constituency is a part of Almora (Lok Sabha constituency). Being a largely rural constituency, Dharchula carries a simulated partisan voting index of INC+2, identifying it as a resilient Congress stronghold within the otherwise competitive Pithoragarh district. While the seat frequently sees narrow margins, it consistently performs roughly 10 to 14 points better for the Indian National Congress (INC) than the Uttarakhand state average, even during significant statewide shifts toward the Bharatiya Janata Party (BJP). The BJP has failed to ever win this seat to date, making it the only seat apart from Jaspur in Kumaon division and Chakrata as a hill constituency and one of the few in the state, to have never been won by the BJP.

== Area and Extent ==
According to the Delimitation Commission of India, the Dharchula Assembly constituency (No. 42) is located within the Pithoragarh district of Uttarakhand and covers the following geographical areas:

- Dharchula Tehsil – Including Dharchula border township, Dharchula Dehat, and the surrounding rural mountain settlements.
- Munsyari Tehsil – Comprising the hill station hub of Munsyari and its associated village blocks.
- Strategic Valleys – The high-altitude border regions of Darma Valley, Vyas Valley, and Johar Valley.
- Major Rural Hubs – Key riverine and mountain settlements including Jauljibi, Baluwakot, Bangapani, and Madkot.

== Demographics and history ==
The regional voting behavior is shaped by the majority of upper caste Hindu voters who make approximately 60% of the electorate, along with dense clusters of the Scheduled Tribe (ST) communities (14.64% of the population), notably the Bhotia and Van Rawat tribes, alongside a 20.51% Scheduled Caste (SC) voter base. This makes representation a highly sensitive communal issue. Despite Hindus accounting for about 97% of the electorate, the nationalist party BJP still is yet to win this seat. The area is predominantly rural, spanning a massive territorial footprint where 93.73% of the population resides in rural mountain villages and only 6.27% live in urbanized border townships. 14.20% of the total population falls within the 0 to 6 age bracket. Approximately 74.50% of the population falls under 18-59 age category and about 11.3% of population is above 60 years.

Dharchula Assembly constituency was established in 2002, after the formation of Uttarakhand. It was separated from the Didihat Assembly constituency and accounts for roughly 78.8% of the total land area of Pithoragarh district. The seat was initially reserved for candidates belonging to Scheduled Tribes (ST). In the first election held in 2002, Independent candidate Gangan Singh Rajwar, a member of the endangered Van Rawat tribe, won the election securing over 42% of the vote and defeating Pradyuman Singh of the Indian National Congress by over 26% , thus becoming the first MLA of this seat. His percent margin of 26% remains one of the highest for an independent candidate, not backed by any party in a major election in India. The Bharatiya Janata Party candidate managed to come fifth and won about 6.6% of the total vote. In the Lok Sabha polls held in 2004, the Indian National Congress candidate lead from this segment by a 7 point margin despite losing the Lok Sabha polls narrowly.

In the 2007 assembly polls, Rajwar again ran as an independent nominee after being denied a ticket by the Indian National Congress, which he had joined briefly and won re-election though by a significantly lower margin of 15.32%, defeating the Bharatiya Janata Party candidate Kundan Singh, who managed to significantly improve his performance by mulling about 22% of the total votes. The Congress dropped to third position securing about 11% of the total vote. This would be the last assembly election where a non-Congress candidate would win this assembly constituency. In the Lok Sabha polls held in 2009, the Indian National Congress candidate Pradeep Tamta lead from this segment by a 6 point margin over BJP candidate Ajay Tamta, which proved to be crucial in his narrow victory of under 1 point.

Following the 2008 delimitation, though the physical boundaries of Dharchula assembly constituency remained the same, the reservation of the assembly segment was shifted from ST to a general seat, where any candidate regardless of his caste or position could contest. In the 2012 assembly election, the incumbent Gagan Singh Rajwar decided to run for a third consecutive term, again as an independent, despite the change in reservation. This time however, he won only about 6.26% of the total votes and finished fifth, a sharp contrast to his 2002 performance. Indian National Congress candidate Harish Singh Dhami ultimately won the election securing about 33% of the vote and defeating the BJP candidate by over 11 points, in a three cornered race with UKD veteran Kashi Singh Airy garnering 14% of the vote.

In the 2014 Lok Sabha polls, despite a strong statewide wave for the Bharatiya Janata Party that saw Ajay Tamta win the overall Almora Lok Sabha constituency by nearly 15 points, Indian National Congress candidate Pradeep Tamta still managed to lead in the Dharchula segment. He secured roughly 48.9% of the segment's votes against Ajay Tamta's 42.8%, giving the Congress a comfortable 6-point lead. Later that same year, incumbent MLA Harish Singh Dhami vacated the seat to allow Harish Rawat, who had taken oath as the Chief Minister of Uttarakhand in February 2014, to contest and fulfill his constitutional requirement of entering the state legislature. In the resulting July 2014 by-election, Rawat registered a landslide victory, securing nearly 75% of the valid votes and defeating his BJP rival B. D. Joshi by a margin of 20,604 votes, the biggest victory margin in the constituency till date.

In the 2017 assembly election, Harish Singh Dhami returned as the Indian National Congress nominee after Harish Rawat chose to contest from constituencies in the plains. Despite the BJP sweeping the state with a three-fourths majority, Dharchula bucked the statewide trend and remained with the Congress. Dhami successfully reclaimed the seat by securing 48% of the vote and defeating BJP candidate Virendra Singh Pal, who garnered 42.2% of the votes polled, by a reduced margin of 3,085 votes.

== Members of Legislative Assembly ==
Election	Name	Party
2002	Gagan Singh Rajwar	Independent
2007	Gagan Singh Rajwar	Independent
2012	Harish Singh Dhami	Indian National Congress
2014 (By Elect)	Harish Rawat	Indian National Congress
2017	Harish Singh Dhami	Indian National Congress
2022	Harish Singh Dhami	Indian National Congress

== Recent election results for this constituency from statewide and national races ==
Year	Office	Results
2009	Lok Sabha	Tamta (INC) 32% – 27%
2012	Assembly	Dhami (INC) 33% – 22%
2014	Lok Sabha	Tamta (INC) 52% – 40%
2014	Assembly (By-poll)	Rawat (INC) 75% – 25%
2017	Assembly	Dhami (INC) 48% – 42%
2019	Lok Sabha	Tamta (BJP) 62% – 35%
2022	Assembly	Dhami (INC) 48% – 46%
2024	Lok Sabha	Tamta (BJP) 62% – 31%

== Election results ==
=== 2027 Assembly election ===
2027 Uttarakhand Legislative Assembly election: Dharchula
Party	Candidate	Votes	%	±%
INC				
BJP				
NOTA	None of the above			
Majority				
Turnout				
		Swing		

=== Assembly Election 2022 ===
2022 Uttarakhand Legislative Assembly election: Dharchula
Party	Candidate	Votes	%	±%
INC	Harish Singh Dhami	27,007	47.95%	▲0.67
BJP	Dhan Singh Dhami (Dhan Da)	25,889	45.96%	▲4.38
Independent	Jeevan Singh Thakur	825	1.46%	New
AAP	Narayan Ram	643	1.14%	New
Independent	Kailash Singh Pangtey	575	1.02%	New
NOTA	None of the above	406	0.72%	▼0.20
UKD	Ramesh Singh	406	0.72%	▼0.91
BSP	Govind Ram	394	0.70%	▼0.12
SP	Manju Devi	180	0.32%	New
Margin of victory		1,118	1.98%	▼3.71
Turnout		56,325	62.03%	▼0.60
Registered electors		90,798		▲5.04
INC hold		Swing	▲0.67	

=== Assembly Election 2017 ===
2017 Uttarakhand Legislative Assembly election: Dharchula
Party	Candidate	Votes	%	±%
INC	Harish Singh Dhami	25,597	47.28%	▼27.35
BJP	Virendra Singh Pal	22,512	41.58%	▲16.21
Independent	Durga Prashad	2,717	5.02%	New
UKD	Lal Singh	883	1.63%	New
Independent	Devindra Singh	631	1.17%	New
Independent	Virendra Singh	540	1.00%	New
NOTA	None of the above	500	0.92%	▼1.54
BSP	Jitendra Kumar	445	0.82%	New
Margin of victory		3,085	5.70%	▼43.57
Turnout		54,140	62.63%	▲11.29
Registered electors		86,441		▲6.10
INC hold		Swing	▼27.35	

=== Assembly By-election 2014 ===
2014 Uttarakhand Legislative Assembly by-election: Dharchula
Party	Candidate	Votes	%	±%
INC	Harish Rawat	31,214	74.63%	▲41.68
BJP	Bishnu Dutt Joshi	10,610	25.37%	▲3.52
NOTA	None of the above	1,028	2.46%	New
Margin of victory		20,604	49.26%	▲38.15
Turnout		41,824	52.61%	▼14.30
Registered electors		81,469		▲11.98
INC hold		Swing	▲41.68	

=== Assembly Election 2012 ===
2012 Uttarakhand Legislative Assembly election: Dharchula
Party	Candidate	Votes	%	±%
INC	Harish Singh Dhami	15,739	32.96%	▲21.36
BJP	Khushal Singh	10,433	21.85%	▼1.20
UKD	Kashi Singh Airy	6,685	14.00%	▲3.95
BSP	Rajendara Singh Kutiyal	4,389	9.19%	▲2.23
Independent	Gagan Singh Rajwar	2,990	6.26%	New
URM	Virendra Singh Pal	2,347	4.91%	New
CPI(ML)L	Jagat Martolia	1,864	3.90%	▲2.50
Independent	Shankar Lal	1,131	2.37%	New
Independent	Laxmi Datt Pant	627	1.31%	New
Independent	Jewan Singh Danu	479	1.00%	New
Independent	Govind Singh	374	0.78%	New
UKPP	Dinesh Singh	361	0.76%	New
Margin of victory		5,306	11.11%	▼4.21
Turnout		47,757	65.64%	▲2.31
Registered electors		72,755		▲32.84
INC gain from Independent		Swing	▼5.41	

=== Assembly Election 2007 ===
2007 Uttarakhand Legislative Assembly election: Dharchula
Party	Candidate	Votes	%	±%
Independent	Gagan Singh Rajwar	13,308	38.37%	New
BJP	Kundan Singh	7,995	23.05%	▲16.44
INC	Shakuntala Devi	4,022	11.60%	▼4.24
UKD	Lal Singh	3,485	10.05%	▲0.38
BSP	Rajendara Singh Kutiyal	2,415	6.96%	▲5.44
Independent	Virendra Singh	1,538	4.43%	New
AIFB	Hoshiyar Singh	935	2.70%	New
Shivsena	Chandra Singh	502	1.45%	New
CPI(ML)L	Jagat Singh (Jagat Martoliya)	486	1.40%	New
Margin of victory		5,313	15.32%	▼11.37
Turnout		34,686	63.38%	▲8.60
Registered electors		54,767		▲1.67
Independent hold		Swing	▼4.16	

=== Assembly Election 2002 ===
2002 Uttaranchal Legislative Assembly election: Dharchula
Party	Candidate	Votes	%	±%
Independent	Gagan Singh Rajwar	12,537	42.52%	New
INC	Pradyuman Singh	4,670	15.84%	New
UKD	Rajendra Singh Raipa	2,849	9.66%	New
Independent	Hoshiyar Singh	2,526	8.57%	New
BJP	Goverdhan Singh	1,950	6.61%	New
Independent	Puran Singh Chalal	1,208	4.10%	New
Independent	Harish Chandra Singh Rawat	1,024	3.47%	New
Uttarakhand Janwadi Party	Mahendra Singh Budiyal	829	2.81%	New
Independent	Jagdish Singh	776	2.63%	New
BSP	Dham Singh Tolia	449	1.52%	New
NCP	Ganga Singh Pangatey	399	1.35%	New
SP	Dan Singh	266	0.90%	New
Margin of victory		7,867	26.68%	
Turnout		29,483	54.80%	
Registered electors		53,869		
Independent win (new seat)				

== See also ==
- Almora (Lok Sabha constituency)
