= Suresh Singh Gariya =

Indian politician

Suresh Singh Gariya (born 1986) is an Indian politician from Uttarakhand. He became an MLA from Kapkot Assembly constituency in Bageshwar district, winning the 2022 Uttarakhand Legislative Assembly election, representing the Bharatiya Janata Party.

== Early life and education ==
Garhia is from Kapkot, Bageshwar district, Uttarakhand. He is the son of Kedar Singh. He completed his B.Ed. in 2010 at S.C.S.S. Government Post Graduate College.

== Career ==
Garhia won from Kapkot Assembly constituency representing the Bharatiya Janata Party in the 2022 Uttarakhand Legislative Assembly election. He polled 31,275 votes and defeated his nearest rival, Lalit Pharswan of Indian National Congress, by a margin of 4,046 votes.
