= Kapkot Assembly constituency =

Constituency of the Uttarakhand legislative assembly in India

Coordinates: 29.94°N 79.90°E

Kapkot
- Constituency No. 46 for the Uttarakhand Legislative Assembly

Constituency details
- Country: India
- Region: North India
- State: Uttarakhand
- District: Bageshwar
- Lok Sabha constituency: Almora
- Total electors: 99,309
- Reservation: None

Member of Legislative Assembly
- 5th Uttarakhand Legislative Assembly
- Incumbent Suresh Singh Gariya
- Party: Bharatiya Janata Party
- Elected year: 2022

Kapkot Legislative Assembly constituency is one of the 70 assembly constituencies of Uttarakhand; a northern state of India. Kapkot is part of Almora Lok Sabha constituency.

== Members of the Legislative Assembly ==
Election	Member	Party
2002	Bhagat Singh Koshyari	Bharatiya Janata Party
2007	Bhagat Singh Koshyari	Bharatiya Janata Party
2009^	Sher Singh Gariya	Bharatiya Janata Party
2012	Lalit Pharswan	Indian National Congress
2017	Balwant Singh Bhauryal	Bharatiya Janata Party
2022	Suresh Singh Gariya	Bharatiya Janata Party

== Election results ==
=== 2027 Assembly election ===
2027 Uttarakhand Legislative Assembly election: Kapkot
Party	Candidate	Votes	%	±%
INC				
BJP				
NOTA	None of the above			
Majority				
Turnout				
gain from		Swing		

=== Assembly Election 2022 ===
2022 Uttarakhand Legislative Assembly election: Kapkot
Party	Candidate	Votes	%	±%
BJP	Suresh Singh Gariya	31,275	48.83%	▲3.67
INC	Lalit Pharswan	27,229	42.51%	▲7.28
AAP	Bhoopesh Upadhyay	3,529	5.51%	New
NOTA	None of the above	785	1.23%	▼0.63
Independent	Rajendra Singh	513	0.80%	New
BSP	Har Govind Joshi	506	0.79%	▼10.77
SP	Hari Singh Shastry	215	0.34%	New
Margin of victory		4,046	6.32%	▼3.61
Turnout		64,052	62.94%	▲0.65
Registered electors		1,01,772		▲5.20
BJP hold		Swing	▲3.67	

=== Assembly Election 2017 ===
2017 Uttarakhand Legislative Assembly election: Kapkot
Party	Candidate	Votes	%	±%
BJP	Balwant Singh Bhauryal	27,213	45.16%	▲4.56
INC	Lalit Pharswan	21,231	35.23%	▼8.02
BSP	Bhoopesh Upadhyay	6,964	11.56%	▲7.81
Independent	Bhagwat Singh Dasila	1,242	2.06%	New
NOTA	None of the above	1,116	1.85%	New
UKD	Ram Singh Aithani	951	1.58%	▼0.97
Independent	Dayal Singh Kapkoti	641	1.06%	New
Margin of victory		5,982	9.93%	▲7.28
Turnout		60,256	62.29%	▲1.88
Registered electors		96,741		▲13.16
BJP gain from INC		Swing	▲1.91	

=== Assembly Election 2012 ===
2012 Uttarakhand Legislative Assembly election: Kapkot
Party	Candidate	Votes	%	±%
INC	Lalit Pharswan	22,335	43.25%	▲24.84
BJP	Balwant Singh Bhauryal	20,966	40.60%	▼4.44
BSP	Karam Singh Danu	1,934	3.75%	New
Independent	Govind Singh Bhandari	1,493	2.89%	New
UKD	Harish Chandra Pathak (Er.)	1,318	2.55%	New
Independent	Himmat Singh Aithani	1,218	2.36%	New
Independent	Ram Singh	997	1.93%	New
URM	Sundar Singh Mehara	449	0.87%	New
Independent	Anand Singh Kapkoti	396	0.77%	New
Margin of victory		1,369	2.65%	▼20.70
Turnout		51,637	60.40%	▲2.04
Registered electors		85,489		
INC gain from BJP		Swing	▼12.41	

=== 2009 by-election ===
Uttarakhand Legislative Assembly by-election 2009: Kapkot
Party	Candidate	Votes	%	±%
BJP	Sher Singh Gariya	13,823	45.04	▼12.62
NCP	Kunti Parihar	6,656	21.68	new
INC	Chamu Singh Ghasiyal	5,651	18.41	▼13.44
Majority		7,167	23.36	▼2.46
Turnout		30,687	58.36	▼9.57
Registered electors		52,582		
BJP hold		Swing	▼2.46	

=== Assembly Election 2007 ===
2007 Uttarakhand Legislative Assembly election: Kapkot
Party	Candidate	Votes	%	±%
BJP	Bhagat Singh Koshyari	21,255	57.66%	▲0.26
INC	Pratap Singh	11,739	31.85%	▲2.19
UKD	Lokapal Singh Karmiyal	1,256	3.41%	▼0.21
Independent	Harish Chandra Singh	1,042	2.83%	New
BSP	Devendra Singh	820	2.22%	New
BJSH	Khayali Chandra Joshi	380	1.03%	New
SP	Nain Ram	369	1.00%	New
Margin of victory		9,516	25.82%	▼1.93
Turnout		36,861	67.93%	▲6.90
Registered electors		54,272		
BJP hold		Swing	▲0.26	

=== Assembly Election 2002 ===
2002 Uttaranchal Legislative Assembly election: Kapkot
Party	Candidate	Votes	%	±%
BJP	Bhagat Singh Koshyari	17,617	57.40%	New
INC	Chamu Singh Gasyal	9,103	29.66%	New
Uttarakhand Janwadi Party	Narendra Singh Bhauryal	1,648	5.37%	New
UKD	K. K. Joshi	1,111	3.62%	New
Independent	Dhanuli Devi	676	2.20%	New
Independent	Jagdish Chandra	536	1.75%	New
Margin of victory		8,514	27.74%	
Turnout		30,691	61.08%	
Registered electors		50,296		
BJP win (new seat)				

== See also ==
- Almora (Lok Sabha constituency)
