= Ranikhet South Assembly constituency =

Former constituency of the Uttar Pradesh legislative assembly in India

Coordinates: 29.64°N 79.43°E

Ranikhet South
- Former constituency for the Uttar Pradesh Legislative Assembly

Constituency details
- Country: India
- Region: North India
- State: Uttar Pradesh
- Established: 1952
- Abolished: 1967

Ranikhet South was one of the 454 constituencies in the Uttar Pradesh Legislative Assembly of Uttar Pradesh a northern state of India. Ranikhet South was also a part of Almora Lok Sabha constituency in present-day Uttarakhand state. This constituency delimited in 1962 to form Ranikhet Assembly constituency.

== Member of Legislative Assembly ==
Election	Member	Party
1951	Hargovind Pant	Indian National Congress
1957	Chandra Bhanu Gupta	Indian National Congress
1958 (By Poll)	L. Singh	Indian National Congress
1961 (By Poll)	Jang Bahadur	Indian National Congress
1962	Chandra Bhanu Gupta	Indian National Congress

- 1967 onwards: Constituency does not exist

See Ranikhet Assembly constituency

== See also ==
- Ranikhet (Vidhan Sabha constituency)
- Ranikhet
- Almora district
- List of constituencies of Uttar Pradesh Legislative Assembly
