= Kichha =

City in Uttarakhand, India

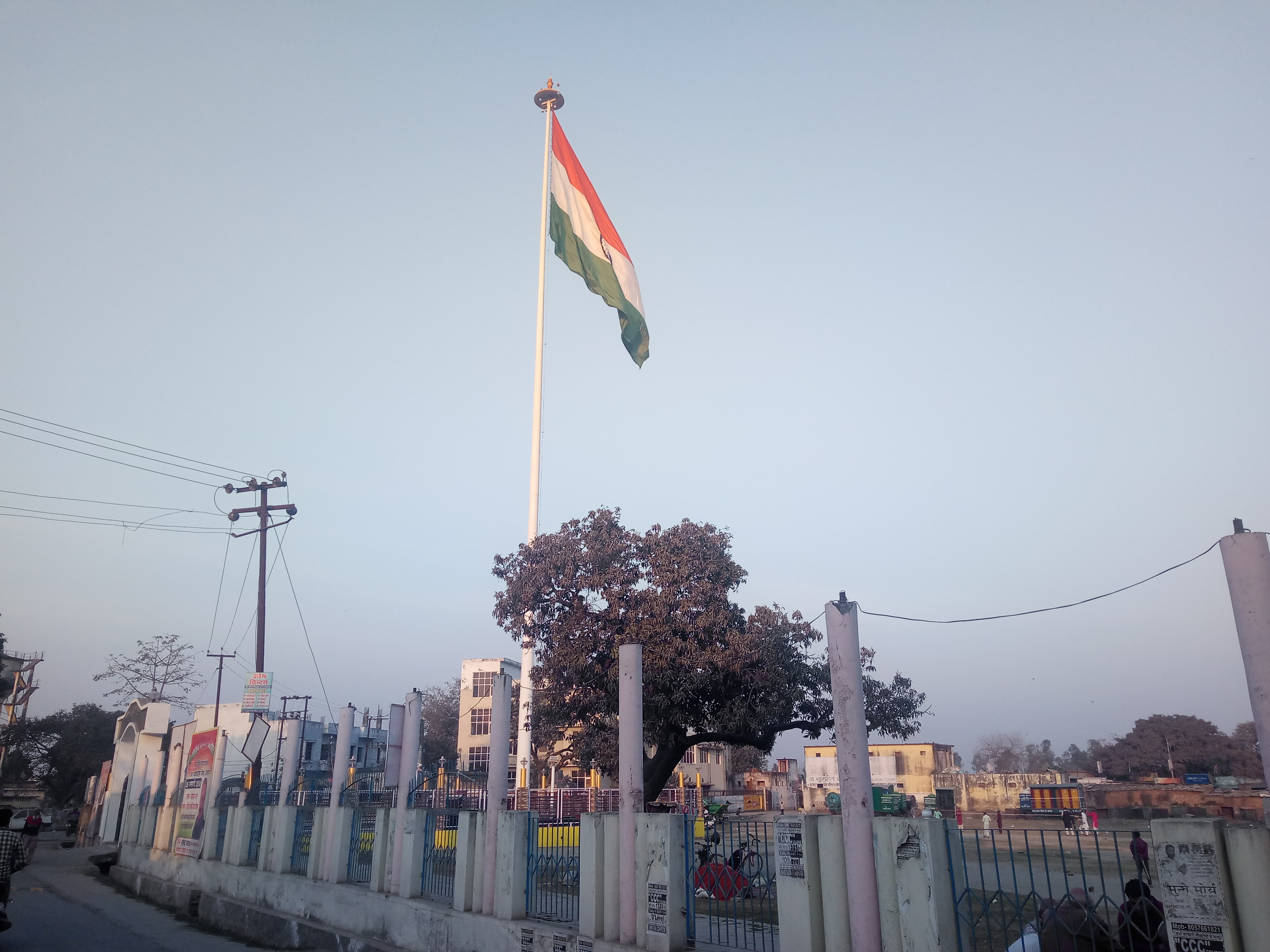
- Indira Gandhi playground in Kichha

- Location in Uttarakhand, India Kichha (India)
- Coordinates: 28.92°N 79.50°E
- Country: India
- State: Uttarakhand
- District: Udham Singh Nagar
- Named for: King Kichaka

Government
  - Type: Municipality
- Elevation: 293 m (961 ft)

Population (2011 Census)
  - Total: 41,965

Languages
  - Official: Hindi
  - Native: Kauravi, Tharu
- Time zone: UTC+5:30 (IST)
- PIN: 263148
- STD code: 05944
- Vehicle registration: UK 06

Kichha is a tehsil in Udham Singh Nagar district, Uttarakhand, India.

== Geography ==
Kichha is located at 28.92°N 79.50°E. The town has an average elevation of 293 meters (953 feet).

== Demographics ==
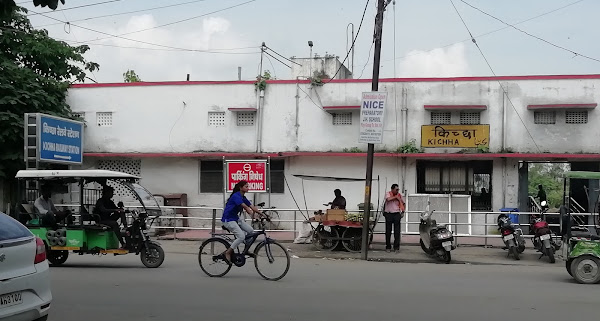
Kichha Railway station

As of 2011 Indian census figures Kichha, had a population of 41,965. Males constitute 53% of the population and females 47%. Kichha has an average literacy rate of 76%, higher than the national average of 59.5%. Male literacy is 83%, and female literacy is 59%. In Kichha, 12% of the population is under 6 years of age.

== Education ==
- G. B. Pant University of Agriculture and Technology

== Notable people ==
Politicians

- Tilak Raj Behar MLA
- Rajesh Shukla Former MLA
