= Ranikhet Assembly constituency =

Constituency of the Uttarakhand legislative assembly in India

Coordinates: 29.64°N 79.43°E

Ranikhet
- Constituency No. 50 for the Uttarakhand Legislative Assembly

Constituency details
- Country: India
- Region: North India
- State: Uttarakhand
- District: Almora
- Lok Sabha constituency: Almora
- Total electors: 79,653
- Reservation: None

Member of Legislative Assembly
- 5th Uttarakhand Legislative Assembly
- Incumbent Pramod Nainwal
- Party: Bharatiya Janta Party
- Elected year: 2022

Ranikhet Uttarakhand Legislative Assembly constituency is one of the 70 constituencies in the Uttarakhand Legislative Assembly of Uttarakhand a northern state of India. Ranikhet is also part of Almora Lok Sabha constituency. Before 2000, this constituency was part of Uttar Pradesh Legislative Assembly. The constituency includes the Ranikhet Cantonment area.

== Members of Legislative Assembly ==
- 1951-62: Constituency does not exist

See Ranikhet South Assembly constituency

Election	Name	Party
1967	Chandra Bhanu Gupta	Indian National Congress
1969	Chandra Bhanu Gupta	Indian National Congress
1974	Govind Singh Mahra	Indian National Congress
1977	Govind Singh Mahra	Janata Party
1980	Jaswant Singh Bisht	Independent
1985	Puran Singh Mahra	Indian National Congress
1989	Jaswant Singh Bisht	Independent
1991	Bachi Singh Rawat	Bharatiya Janata Party
1993	Bachi Singh Rawat	Bharatiya Janata Party
1996	Ajay Bhatt	Bharatiya Janata Party
Major boundary changes
2002	Ajay Bhatt	Bharatiya Janata Party
2007	Karan Mahara	Indian National Congress
2012	Ajay Bhatt	Bharatiya Janata Party
2017	Karan Mahara	Indian National Congress
2022	Pramod Nainwal	Bharatiya Janata Party

== Election results ==
=== 2027 Assembly election ===
2027 Uttarakhand Legislative Assembly election: Ranikhet
Party	Candidate	Votes	%	±%
INC				
BJP				
NOTA	None of the above			
Majority				
Turnout				
gain from		Swing		

=== Assembly Election 2022 ===
2022 Uttarakhand Legislative Assembly election: Ranikhet
Party	Candidate	Votes	%	±%
BJP	Dr. Pramod Nainwal	21,047	50.05%	▲15.91
INC	Karan Mahara	18,463	43.90%	▼2.33
BSP	Manoj Kumar	2,441	5.8	
Margin of victory		2,584	6.14%	▼5.95
Turnout		42,054	51.90%	▲0.13
Registered electors		81,029		▲1.88
BJP gain from INC		Swing	▲3.82	

=== Assembly Election 2017 ===
2017 Uttarakhand Legislative Assembly election: Ranikhet
Party	Candidate	Votes	%	±%
INC	Karan Mahara	19,035	46.23%	▲10.77
BJP	Ajay Bhatt	14,054	34.13%	▼1.52
Independent	Dr. Pramod Nainwal	5,701	13.85%	New
BSP	Kripal Ram	1,169	2.84%	▼20.81
NOTA	None of the above	637	1.55%	New
UKD	Pratap Singh Shahi	414	1.01%	▲0.32
Margin of victory		4,981	12.10%	▲11.90
Turnout		41,173	51.77%	▼1.61
Registered electors		79,537		▲7.44
INC gain from BJP		Swing	▲10.57	

=== Assembly Election 2012 ===
2012 Uttarakhand Legislative Assembly election: Ranikhet
Party	Candidate	Votes	%	±%
BJP	Ajay Bhatt	14,089	35.66%	▼0.62
INC	Karan Mahara	14,011	35.46%	▼1.37
BSP	Puran Singh	9,346	23.65%	▲5.28
Independent	Mahendra Singh Bisht	765	1.94%	New
Independent	Kishan Lal	476	1.20%	New
SP	Puran Chandra Joshi	315	0.80%	▼0.23
UKD	Pratibha Negi	269	0.68%	▼0.62
Margin of victory		78	0.20%	▼0.36
Turnout		39,512	53.37%	▼7.54
Registered electors		74,031		
BJP gain from INC		Swing	▼1.18	

=== Assembly Election 2007 ===
2007 Uttarakhand Legislative Assembly election: Ranikhet
Party	Candidate	Votes	%	±%
INC	Karan Mahara	13,503	36.83%	▲10.70
BJP	Ajay Bhatt	13,298	36.27%	▲2.52
BSP	Puran Singh	6,736	18.37%	▲14.37
Independent	Hari Singh	1,108	3.02%	New
BJSH	Prakash Chandra Singh	511	1.39%	New
UKD	Vimla Negi	477	1.30%	▼11.90
Vishwa Vikas Sangh	Shridhar Pant	441	1.20%	New
SP	Jaswant Singh	378	1.03%	▼0.54
SJP(R)	Pradeep Kumar Bhandari	207	0.56%	New
Margin of victory		205	0.56%	▼7.06
Turnout		36,659	60.97%	▲8.83
Registered electors		60,188		
INC gain from BJP		Swing	▲3.08	

=== Assembly Election 2002 ===
2002 Uttaranchal Legislative Assembly election: Ranikhet
Party	Candidate	Votes	%	±%
BJP	Ajay Bhatt	10,199	33.75%	New
INC	Pooran Singh	7,897	26.13%	New
UKD	Narendra Singh	3,990	13.20%	New
Independent	Ramesh Singh Chilwal	3,515	11.63%	New
Uttarakhand Janwadi Party	Prakash Chandra Singh	1,523	5.04%	New
BSP	Kishan Lal	1,209	4.00%	New
Independent	Piyush Chandra	754	2.50%	New
SP	Balwant Singh	474	1.57%	New
JD(S)	Suchitra Rawat	374	1.24%	New
RLD	Mohan Chandra Belwal	282	0.93%	New
Margin of victory		2,302	7.62%	
Turnout		30,217	52.13%	
Registered electors		58,018		
BJP win (new seat)				

== See also ==
- Ranikhet South Assembly constituency
- Ranikhet North Assembly constituency
- Ranikhet
- Almora district
- List of constituencies of the Uttarakhand Legislative Assembly
