= Karan Mahara =

Indian politician

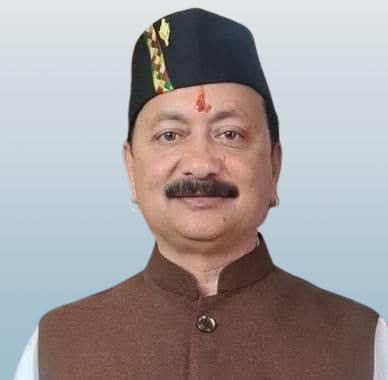

President Uttarakhand Pradesh Congress Committee
- In office 10 April 2021 – 11 November 2025
- Preceded by: Ganesh Godiyal
- Succeeded by: Ganesh Godiyal

Member of the Uttarakhand Legislative Assembly
- In office 2017–2022
- Succeeded by: Pramod Nainwal, BJP
- Constituency: Ranikhet

Personal details
- Born: 12 July 1972 (age 53) Ranikhet, Uttarakhand, India
- Party: Indian National Congress

Karan Mahara (born 12 July 1972) is an Indian politician from Uttarakhand and a former two-term member of the Uttarakhand Legislative Assembly. He held the post of Deputy Leader of opposition in Uttarakhand assembly from 2017 to 2022.

He was the president of Uttarakhand Pradesh Congress Committee. He was appointed Uttarakhand Pradesh Congress president on 10 April 2022 and served till 11 November 2025.

== Electoral performance ==
Election	Constituency	Party	Result	Votes %	Opposition Candidate	Opposition Party	Opposition vote %	Ref
2022	Ranikhet	INC	Lost	43.90%	Dr. Pramod Nainwal	BJP	50.05%	
2017	Ranikhet	INC	Won	46.23%	Ajay Bhatt	BJP	34.13%	
2012	Ranikhet	INC	Lost	35.46%	Ajay Bhatt	BJP	35.66%	
2007	Ranikhet	INC	Won	36.83%	Ajay Bhatt	BJP	36.27%	

Party political offices
Preceded by Ganesh Godiyal	President; Uttarakhand Pradesh Congress Committee; 10 April 2022 - 11 November 2025	Succeeded by Ganesh Godiyal
