= Kichha Assembly constituency =

Legislative Assembly constituency in Uttarakhand State, India

Coordinates: 28.91°N 79.51°E

Kichha
- Constituency No. 67 for the Uttarakhand Legislative Assembly

Constituency details
- Country: India
- Region: North India
- State: Uttarakhand
- District: Udham Singh Nagar
- Lok Sabha constituency: Nainital–Udhamsingh Nagar
- Total electors: 139,845
- Reservation: None

Member of Legislative Assembly
- 5th Uttarakhand Legislative Assembly
- Incumbent Tilak Raj Behar
- Party: Indian National Congress
- Elected year: 2022

Kichha Legislative Assembly constituency is one of the 70 assembly constituencies of Uttarakhand. It is a part of Udham Singh Nagar district.

== Members of the Legislative Assembly ==
Election	Member	Party
2012	Rajesh Shukla	Bharatiya Janata Party
2017	Rajesh Shukla	Bharatiya Janata Party
2022	Tilak Raj Behar	Indian National Congress

== Election results ==
=== 2027 Assembly election ===
2027 Uttarakhand Legislative Assembly election: Kichha
Party	Candidate	Votes	%	±%
INC				
BJP				
NOTA	None of the above			
Majority				
Turnout				
gain from		Swing		

=== Assembly Election 2022 ===
2022 Uttarakhand Legislative Assembly election: Kichha
Party	Candidate	Votes	%	±%
INC	Tilak Raj Behar	49,552	49.51%	▲6.19
BJP	Rajesh Shukla	39,475	39.44%	▼6.29
Independent	Ajay Kumar Tiwari	6,219	6.21%	New
AAP	Kulavanta Singh	1,671	1.67%	New
BSP	Ubaid Ullah Khan Alias Nawab Rashid Khan	855	0.85%	▼7.93
NOTA	None of the above	554	0.55%	▼0.08
Margin of victory		10,077	10.07%	▲7.66
Turnout		1,00,088	71.57%	▼1.81
Registered electors		1,39,845		▲16.27
INC gain from BJP		Swing	▲3.78	

=== Assembly Election 2017 ===
2017 Uttarakhand Legislative Assembly election: Kichha
Party	Candidate	Votes	%	±%
BJP	Rajesh Shukla	40,363	45.73%	▼0.03
INC	Harish Rawat	38,236	43.32%	▲8.84
BSP	Rajesh Pratap Singh	7,754	8.79%	▼2.28
NOTA	None of the above	558	0.63%	New
SP	Sanjay Singh	459	0.52%	▼0.50
Margin of victory		2,127	2.41%	▼8.86
Turnout		88,260	73.38%	▼3.19
Registered electors		1,20,274		▲26.22
BJP hold		Swing	▼0.03	

=== Assembly Election 2012 ===
2012 Uttarakhand Legislative Assembly election: Kichha
Party	Candidate	Votes	%	±%
BJP	Rajesh Shukla	33,388	45.76%	New
INC	Sarwar Yar Khan	25,162	34.49%	New
BSP	Rajesh Pratap Singh	8,072	11.06%	New
URM	Suresh Agarwal	3,287	4.51%	New
SP	Iqbal Qureshi	743	1.02%	New
UKD	Mahendra Singh Rawat	559	0.77%	New
Independent	Mohmmad Yasin	520	0.71%	New
Bhartiya Chaitanya Party	Harish Chander Joshi	480	0.66%	New
Independent	Artaim Kathaayat	462	0.63%	New
Margin of victory		8,226	11.27%	
Turnout		72,962	76.57%	
Registered electors		95,287		
BJP win (new seat)				

== See also ==
- Rudrapur–Kichha (Uttarakhand Assembly constituency)
- List of constituencies of the Uttarakhand Legislative Assembly
- Udham Singh Nagar district
