= Chandan Ram Das =

Indian politician (died 2023)

Minister of Social Welfare, Minority Welfare, Transport, MSME Government of Uttarakhand
- In office 23 March 2022 – 26 April 2023

Member of the Uttarakhand Legislative Assembly
- In office 2007–2023
- Preceded by: Ram Prasad Tamta
- Succeeded by: Parwati Das
- Constituency: Bageshwar

Personal details
- Born: 10 August 1957 Uttar Pradesh, India
- Died: 26 April 2023 (aged 65) Bageshwar, Uttarakhand, India
- Party: Bharatiya Janata Party
- Occupation: Politician

Chandan Ram Das (10 August 1957 – 26 April 2023) was an Indian politician of the Bharatiya Janata Party who was a member of the Uttarakhand Legislative Assembly from the Bageshwar constituency in Bageshwar district from 2007 until his death in 2023.

== Death ==
Das died on 26 April 2023, at the age of 65 at Bageshwar district hospital.
