= Rajesh Shukla =

Indian politician

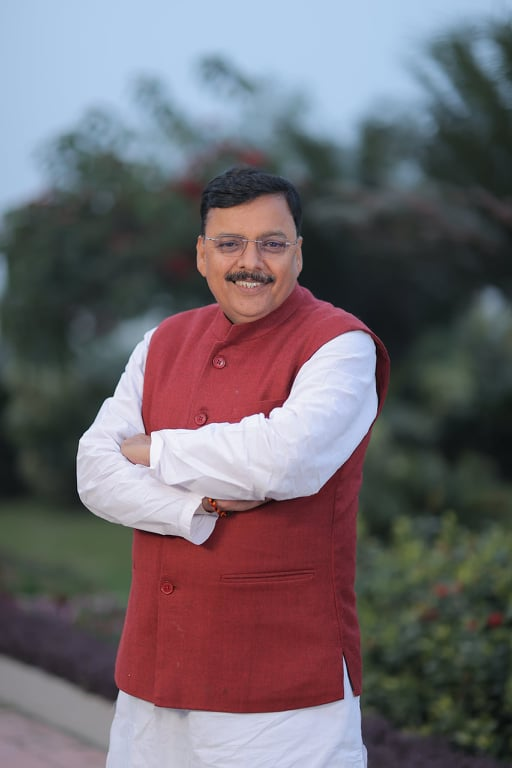

Member of Uttarakhand Legislative Assembly
- In office 2012–2022
- Preceded by: Constituency established
- Succeeded by: Tilak Raj Behar
- Constituency: Kichha

Personal details
- Party: Bharatiya Janata Party

Rajesh Shukla is an Indian politician and member of the Bharatiya Janata Party. Shukla is a two-times member of the Uttarakhand Legislative Assembly from the Kichha constituency in Udham Singh Nagar district. In the 2017 elections, he defeated the then sitting Chief Minister Of Uttarakhand Harish Rawat.
