= Kalpana Saini =

Indian politician

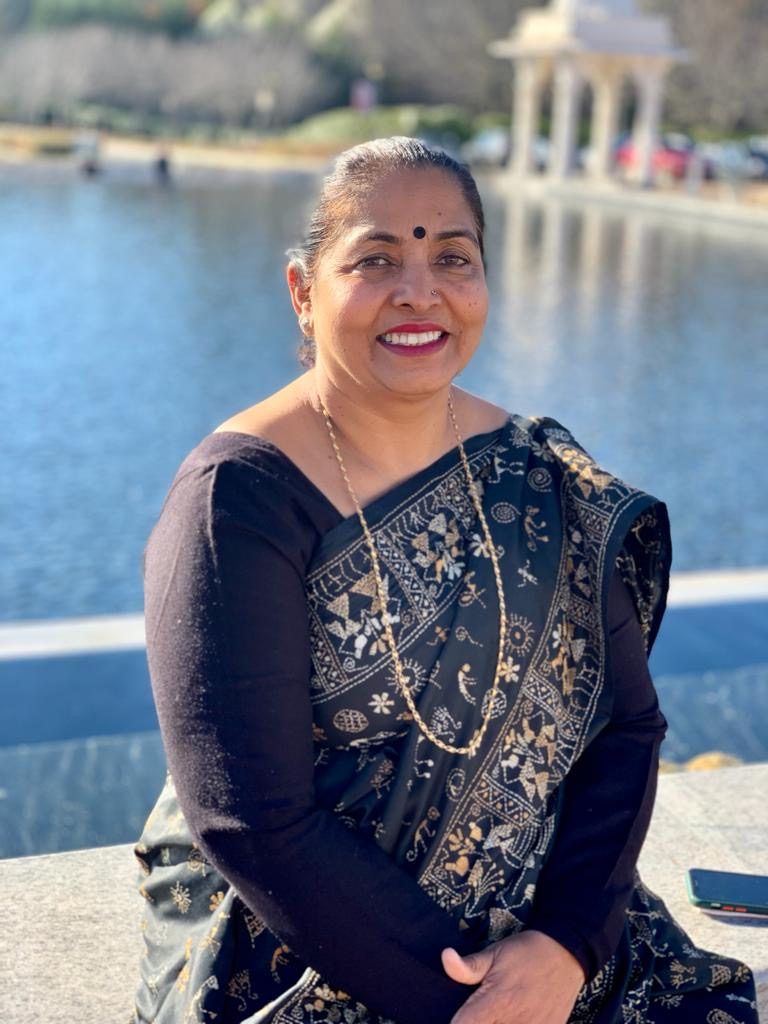

Member of Parliament, Rajya Sabha
- Incumbent
- Assumed office 5 July 2022
- Preceded by: Pradeep Tamta
- Constituency: Uttarakhand

Personal details
- Party: Bharatiya Janata Party

Kalpana Saini (born 1 October 1959) is an Indian politician. She is a member of the Bharatiya Janata Party (BJP). She serves as Member of parliament Rajya Sabha. She previously served as Chair of Backward Commission of Uttarakhand Government.

== Early life ==
Kalpana was born in the village of (Shivdaspur- teliwala) Roorkee in Haridwar District of the Indian state of Uttar Pradesh in a Saini farm family. Her father was Prithvi Singh Viksit and her mother was Kamala Devi. She earned a PhD degree in Sanskrit, acquiring first division results from the Meerut University. Saini became associated with the Rashtriya Swayamsevak Sangh in 1990 and remained during her employment as a principal in Roorkee. In 1995, she was appointed councilor for Roorkee for BJP. She is one of the most powerful and influential BJP leaders in Uttarakhand.

== Career ==
She began her career as a lecturer and served as Principal at Gandhi Mahila Shilp Vidyalaya from 1987. She later used her connections with the Hindutva organization, Rashtriya Swayamsevak Sangh to become involved with the Bharatiya Janata Party.

She was Director of National Fertiliser Limited and District President of Roorkee. Before that State Secretary of the state of Uttarakhand, State President of Uttarakhand Pradhanacharya Parishad from 2003 to 2005. She has also served as the General Secretary of Durga Vahini, Roorkee Uttarakhand and President of Sewa bharti Matri Mandal, Roorkee and Councilor of the BJP, 1995–2000. She held many senior position at BJP, VHP and Yogi Mangalnath Saraswati Shishu mandir. On 29 May 2022 The Bhartiya Janata Party named Kalpana Saini as its nominee for the Rajya Sabha (RS) seat from Uttarakhand and she was elected unopposed. She became the 2nd woman from hill state to represent Uttrakhand in Rajya sabha.
