= Someshwar Assembly constituency =

Constituency of the Uttarakhand legislative assembly in India

Coordinates: 29.78°N 79.6°E

Someshwar
- Constituency No. 51 for the Uttarakhand Legislative Assembly

Constituency details
- Country: India
- Region: North India
- State: Uttarakhand
- District: Almora
- Lok Sabha constituency: Almora
- Total electors: 87,411
- Reservation: SC

Member of Legislative Assembly
- 5th Uttarakhand Legislative Assembly
- Incumbent Rekha Arya
- Party: Bharatiya Janata Party
- Elected year: 2022

Someshwar is one of the 70 Legislative Assembly constituencies of Uttarakhand state in India.

It is part of Almora district and is reserved for candidates belonging to the Scheduled castes.

== Members of the Legislative Assembly ==
Election	Member	Party
2002	Pradeep Tamta	Indian National Congress
2007	Ajay Tamta	Bharatiya Janata Party
2012	Ajay Tamta	Bharatiya Janata Party
2014 By-election	Rekha Arya	Indian National Congress
2017	Rekha Arya	Bharatiya Janata Party
2022	Rekha Arya	Bharatiya Janata Party

== Election results ==
=== 2027 Assembly election ===
2027 Uttarakhand Legislative Assembly election: Someshwar
Party	Candidate	Votes	%	±%
INC				
BJP				
NOTA	None of the above			
Majority				
Turnout				
gain from		Swing		

=== Assembly Election 2022 ===
2022 Uttarakhand Legislative Assembly election: Someshwar
Party	Candidate	Votes	%	±%
BJP	Rekha Arya	26,161	52.09%	▲4.86
INC	Rajendra Barakoti	20,868	41.55%	▼4.14
NOTA	None of the above	1,007	2.00%	▼0.36
Independent	Madhubala	735	1.46%	New
AAP	Harish Chandra	588	1.17%	New
UKPP	Kiran Arya	426	0.85%	New
Margin of victory		5,293	10.54%	▲9.00
Turnout		50,225	56.63%	▲2.75
Registered electors		88,690		▲3.61
BJP hold		Swing	▲4.86	

=== Assembly Election 2017 ===
2017 Uttarakhand Legislative Assembly election: Someshwar
Party	Candidate	Votes	%	±%
BJP	Rekha Arya	21,780	47.23%	▲12.51
INC	Rajendra Barakoti	21,070	45.69%	▼15.45
NOTA	None of the above	1,089	2.36%	New
Independent	Pradeep Kumar Arya	841	1.82%	New
BSP	Himanshu Kohli	622	1.35%	New
Independent	Puran Chandra	263	0.57%	New
Margin of victory		710	1.54%	▼24.89
Turnout		46,118	53.88%	▲7.39
Registered electors		85,597		▲4.69
BJP gain from INC		Swing	▼13.91	

=== Assembly By-election 2014 ===
2014 Uttarakhand Legislative Assembly by-election: Someshwar
Party	Candidate	Votes	%	±%
INC	Rekha Arya	23,241	61.14%	▲38.98
BJP	Mohan Ram Arya	13,196	34.71%	▼4.72
UKPP	Pream Ram Arya	814	2.14%	New
NOTA	None of the above	630	1.66%	New
Independent	Parveen Kumar	411	1.08%	New
Independent	Puran Kumar	351	0.92%	New
Margin of victory		10,045	26.43%	▲20.29
Turnout		38,013	47.24%	▼11.47
Registered electors		81,764		
INC gain from BJP		Swing	▲21.71	

=== Assembly Election 2012 ===
2012 Uttarakhand Legislative Assembly election: Someshwar
Party	Candidate	Votes	%	±%
BJP	Ajay Tamta	17,288	39.43%	▼6.56
Independent	Rekha Arya	14,597	33.29%	New
INC	Rajendra Barakoti	9,716	22.16%	▼19.48
BSP	Shudha Nand	1,120	2.55%	▼1.45
Sainik Samaj Party	Amar Ram	888	2.03%	New
Margin of victory		2,691	6.14%	▲1.78
Turnout		43,842	57.96%	▼2.63
Registered electors		75,643		
BJP hold		Swing	▼6.56	

=== Assembly Election 2007 ===
2007 Uttarakhand Legislative Assembly election: Someshwar
Party	Candidate	Votes	%	±%
BJP	Ajay Tamta	15,985	46.00%	▲14.93
INC	Pradeep Tamta	14,472	41.64%	▲7.26
BSP	Yash Pal	1,393	4.01%	▲1.01
Independent	Shiv Lal	1,015	2.92%	New
UKD	Pream Ram Arya	894	2.57%	New
BJSH	Rajesh Kumar	719	2.07%	New
SP	Lalu Ram	274	0.79%	▼6.44
Margin of victory		1,513	4.35%	▲1.03
Turnout		34,752	60.61%	▲11.05
Registered electors		57,359		▲6.84
BJP gain from INC		Swing	▲11.61	

=== Assembly Election 2002 ===
2002 Uttaranchal Legislative Assembly election: Someshwar
Party	Candidate	Votes	%	±%
INC	Pradeep Tamta	9,146	34.39%	New
BJP	Rajesh Kumar	8,263	31.07%	New
Independent	Hansi	2,650	9.96%	New
SP	Deepak Kumar	1,922	7.23%	New
Independent	Ajay Tamta	1,286	4.84%	New
BSP	Mohan Ram Arya	797	3.00%	New
Independent	Mohan Ram	618	2.32%	New
SAP	Pushpa	565	2.12%	New
LJP	Basant Ram	510	1.92%	New
CPI(ML)L	Bali Ram	436	1.64%	New
RLD	Ramesh Chandra Arya	404	1.52%	New
Margin of victory		883	3.32%	
Turnout		26,597	49.54%	
Registered electors		53,689		
INC win (new seat)				

== See also ==
- List of constituencies of the Uttarakhand Legislative Assembly
- Almora district
