= Jeewan Sharma =

Indian Politician

Member of Parliament, Lok Sabha
- In office 1991–1996
- Preceded by: Harish Rawat
- Succeeded by: Bachi Singh Rawat
- Constituency: Almora

Personal details
- Born: 1 December 1956 (age 68); Delhi, India
- Political party: Bharatiya Janata Party
- Spouse: Kamala Sharma (m. 1986)
- Children: 1 son
- Parent: H.B. Sharma (father)
- Education: Bachelor of Arts
- Alma mater: Delhi University
- Profession: Businessman, Politician

Jeewan Sharma is an Indian politician from Bharatiya Janata Party, Uttarakhand who had represented Almora constituency in the Lok Sabha from 1991 to 1996.
