= Harish Singh Dhami =

Indian politician

Member of Legislative Assembly for Dharchula
- Incumbent
- Assumed office 2017
- Preceded by: Harish Rawat
- In office 2012–2014
- Preceded by: Gagan Singh Rajwar
- Succeeded by: Harish Rawat

Personal details
- Party: Indian National Congress

Harish Singh Dhami is an Indian politician from Uttarakhand and a three term Member of the Uttarakhand Legislative Assembly. He represents the Dharchula (Uttarakhand Assembly constituency). He is a member of the Indian National Congress. He was first elected to the seat in 2012. In 2014, he vacated his seat for then Chief Minister of Uttarakhand Harish Rawat, after that he was appointed the Chairman of Van Vikas Nigam (Rank Cabinet Minister). He later regained the seat in 2017 and was re-elected in 2022 as a candidate of the Indian National Congress.

== Positions held ==
Year	Description
2012 - 2014	Elected to 3rd Uttarakhand Assembly: Member - Public Accounts Committee (2012–13); Member - Committee on Petition (2012–13); Member - Committee on Estimates (2013–14); Member - Committee on SC, ST and OBC (2013–14)
2014 - 2017	Chairman - Van Vikas Nigam (Rank Cabinet Minister)
2017 - 2022	Elected to 4th Uttarakhand Assembly (2nd term): Member - Committee on SC, ST and OBC (2017–18)
2022	Elected to 5th Uttarakhand Assembly (3rd term)
