= Newlai Tingkhatra =

Indian politician

Member of the Arunachal Pradesh Legislative Assembly
- In office 1999–2014
- Constituency: Kanubari

Personal details
- Born: 1953
- Died: 2014 (aged 60–61)
- Party: Indian National Congress
- Parent: Late Bosa Tingkhatara (father)
- Education: B.A.
- Alma mater: JN College, Pasighat
- Profession: Business

Newlai Tingkhatra (1953–2014) was an Indian politician from Arunachal Pradesh. He was elected to the Arunachal Pradesh Legislative Assembly from the Kanubari Assembly constituency in 1999, 2004, 2009 and 2014 Arunachal Pradesh Legislative Assembly election as a member of the Indian National Congress. Tingkhatra has also served as Transport and Cooperation Minister in Nabam Tuki ministry before dying from a heart attack in 2014.

Newlai Tingkhatra also served as Forest and Environment minister in Dorjee Khandu's Ministry.

== Death ==
Newlai Tingkhatra died on 8 May 2014 in Gurgaon. He was survived by his wife, three sons and four daughters.
