= Pradeep Tamta =

Indian politician

MP of Rajya Sabha
- In office 5 July 2016 – 5 July 2022
- Preceded by: Tarun Vijay
- Succeeded by: Kalpana Saini
- Constituency: Uttarakhand

Member of the Lok Sabha
- In office 2009–2014
- Preceded by: Bachi Singh Rawat
- Succeeded by: Ajay Tamta
- Constituency: Almora

Personal details
- Born: 16 June 1958 (age 68)
- Party: Indian National Congress
- Profession: Politician

Pradeep Tamta (born 16 June 1958) is an Indian politician of Indian National Congress (INC) from Uttarakhand state. He served as the member of the Rajya Sabha. He was the member of 15th Lok Sabha from Almora constituency and also served as the member of 1st Uttarakhand Assembly from Someshwar constituency.

== Personal life ==
He was born in Lob Village of Bageshwar district to Gusain Ram and Parvati Devi. He received a MA, B.ed and LLB from Kumaun University, Nainital district. He is married to Renu Tamta and has two daughters.

== Positions held ==
Year	Description
2002 - 2007	Elected to 1st Uttarakhand Assembly (1st term): Vice Chairman - Uttarakhand Udyog Parishad (2002–03); Member - Assembly Committee on SCs, STs and OBCs (2002–04); Member - Committee on PSE and Corporate (2004–07)
2009 - 2014	Elected to 15th Lok Sabha (1st term): Member - Committee on Science & Technology, Environment & Forests (2009 - 14); Member - Committee on Official Language (2009 - 14); Member - Consultative Committee for the Ministry of Rural Development, Panchayati Raj and Drinking Water and Sanitation (2009 - 14)
2016 - 2022	Elected to Rajya Sabha (1st term): Member - Committee on the Welfare of Scheduled Castes and Scheduled Tribes (2016–19) & (2020–2022); Member - Committee on Water Resources (2016 - 2022); Member - Consultative Committee for the Ministry of Rural Development, Panchayati Raj and Mines (2016–19); Member - Committee on Official Language (2018 - 2022); Member - All India Institute of Medical Sciences, Rai Bareli (2019 - 2022); Member - Committee on Subordinate Legislation (2019 - 2022); Member - Consultative Committee for the Ministry of Rural Development and the Panchayati Raj (2019 - 2022)

== Elections contested ==
=== Loksabha ===
Year	Constituency	Result	Vote percentage	Opposition Candidate	Opposition Party	Opposition vote percentage	Ref
2009	Almora	Won	41.70%	Ajay Tamta	BJP	40.36%	
2014	Almora	Lost	38.44%	Ajay Tamta	BJP	53.00%	
2019	Almora	Lost	30.48%	Ajay Tamta	BJP	64.03%	
2024	Almora	Lost	29.18%	Ajay Tamta	BJP	64.20%	

=== Uttarakhand Legislative Assembly ===
Year	Constituency	Result
1993	Bageshwar	Lost
2002	Someshwar	Won
2007	Someshwar	Lost
