= Tilak Raj Behar =

Indian politician (born 1957)

- तिलक राज बेहड़

Member of the Legislative Assembly
- In office 1993–2002
- Constituency: Haldwani

Member of the Legislative Assembly
- In office 2002–2012
- Constituency: Rudrapur-Kichha

Minister of Health, Family Welfare, AYUSH and Medical Education, Govt. of Uttarakhand
- In office 2002–2007

Minister of Transport, Food and Civil Supplies, Govt. of Uttarakhand
- In office 2001–2002

Member of the Legislative Assembly
- Incumbent
- Assumed office 2022
- Constituency: Kichha

Personal details
- Born: 1 February 1957 (age 69) Rudrapur, Uttarakhand, India
- Party: Indian National Congress (since 2002)
- Other political affiliations: Bharatiya Janata Party (until 2002)
- Spouse: Veena Behar
- Children: 2 Sons, 2 Daughters
- Website: Official website

Tilak Raj Behar (Hindi: तिलक राज बेहड़, born 1 February 1957) is an Indian politician. He currently serves as the MLA for the 67-Kichha Vidhan Sabha constituency in Uttarakhand. He has held positions such as Health Minister in the Government of Uttarakhand, Deputy Leader of the Opposition in the Uttarakhand Legislative Assembly, and Working President of the Uttarakhand Pradesh Congress Committee.

He has been elected to the Legislative Assembly of Uttar Pradesh/Uttarakhand five times - having won from Haldwani Assembly Constituency in Uttar Pradesh in 1993 and 1996, from Rudrapur-Kichha Assembly Constituency in Uttarakhand in 2002 and 2007, and from Kichha Assembly Constituency in Uttarakhand in 2022.

Behar is a member of the Indian National Congress, though he was formerly associated with the Bharatiya Janata Party. He has held positions such as Minister of Health and Family Welfare, Minister of Transport, Food and Civil Supplies in the Uttarakhand government, Chairman of Mandi Parishad of Uttarakhand, and Chairman of Uttarakhand State Seed and Organic Production Certification Agency.

Behar came to prominence through his handling of the Health Ministry in the state of Uttarakhand from 2002 to 2007 in the Narayan Dutt Tiwari Cabinet.

== Public offices held ==
- MLA, Kichha Vidhan Sabha, Uttarakhand (2022–Present)
- Working President, Uttarakhand Pradesh Congress Committee (2021–Present)
- Chairman, Uttarakhand State Seed and Organic Production Certification Agency with Cabinet Minister Rank (2014–2016)
- Deputy Leader of Opposition, Uttarakhand Vidhan Sabha (2009–2012)
- MLA, Rudrapur-Kichha Vidhan Sabha, Uttarakhand (2007-2012)
- Minister of Health, Family Welfare, AYUSH and Medical Education, Govt. of Uttarakhand (2002–2007)
- MLA, Rudrapur-Kichha Vidhan Sabha, Uttarakhand (2002-2007)
- Minister of Transport, Food and Civil Supplies, Govt. of Uttarakhand (2001–2002)
- Chairman of Mandi Parishad of Uttarakhand with Cabinet Minister Rank (2000–2001)
- MLA, Haldwani Vidhan Sabha, UP (1996-2002) on BJP ticket
- MLA, Haldwani Vidhan Sabha, UP (1993-1996) on BJP ticket
