= Harish Rawat =

7th Chief Minister of Uttarakhand

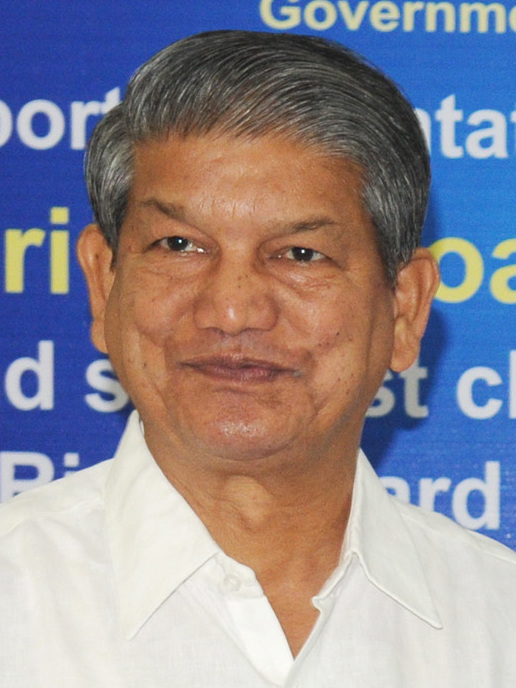
- Rawat in 2012

7th Chief Minister of Uttarakhand
- In office 11 May 2016 – 18 March 2017
- Preceded by: President's rule
- Succeeded by: Trivendra Singh Rawat
- In office 21 April 2016 – 22 April 2016
- Preceded by: President's rule
- Succeeded by: President's rule
- In office 1 February 2014 – 27 March 2016
- Preceded by: Vijay Bahuguna
- Succeeded by: President's rule

Union Minister of Water Resources
- In office 30 October 2012 – 31 January 2014
- Prime Minister: Manmohan Singh
- Preceded by: Pawan Kumar Bansal
- Succeeded by: Ghulam Nabi Azad

Member of Parliament, Lok Sabha
- In office 2009–2014
- Preceded by: Rajendra Kumar Badi
- Succeeded by: Ramesh Pokhriyal
- Constituency: Haridwar
- In office 1980–1991
- Preceded by: Murli Manohar Joshi
- Succeeded by: Jeewan Sharma
- Constituency: Almora

Member of Parliament, Rajya Sabha
- In office 2002–2008
- Preceded by: Manohar Kant Dhyani
- Succeeded by: Bhagat Singh Koshyari
- Constituency: Uttarakhand

Personal details
- Born: 27 April 1948 (age 78) Almora, United Provinces, India (now in Uttarakhand, India)
- Citizenship: India
- Party: Indian National Congress
- Spouse: Renuka Rawat
- Children: 3
- Parent(s): Rajendra Singh Rawat (father); Devki Devi (mother)
- Education: Bachelor of Arts; L.L.B.
- Alma mater: University of Lucknow
- Occupation: Politician

Harish Singh Rawat (born 27 April 1948) is an Indian politician who served as the Chief Minister of Uttarakhand from 2014 to 2017. A five-time Member of Parliament, Rawat is a senior leader of the Indian National Congress party. As a member of 15th Lok Sabha, Rawat served as Union Minister of Water Resources in the cabinet of Prime Minister Manmohan Singh from 2012 to 2014. He also worked as Minister of State at the Ministry of Parliamentary Affairs, Ministry of Agriculture, Ministry of Food Processing Industries (2011–2012) and Ministry of Labour and Employment (2009–2011).

== Early life and education ==
Harish Rawat was born in a Kumaoni Rajput family in Mohnari village (Adbora Mohnari Graam Sabha), near Chaunalia (263680), Ranikhet in Almora district of the United Provinces (now Uttarakhand) on 27 April 1948 to Rajendra Singh Rawat and Devki Devi. He studied from GIC Chaunalia in his early days. He received a Bachelor of Arts and LL.B. from Lucknow University. He is married to his fellow Congress member and politician Renuka Rawat who also obtained Bachelor of Law from Lucknow University.

== Early political career ==
Starting at village level politics, and after staying as a trade unionist and an Indian Youth Congress member for many years, he joined the Indian Parliament in 1980 as a member of the 7th Lok Sabha by defeating the BJP veteran Murli Manohar Joshi from Almora parliamentary constituency, followed by the 8th Lok Sabha and the 9th Lok Sabha. He has been head of Congress Volunteer Wing, Congress Seva Dal, since 1980. In 1981, he along with Subramanian Swamy and 13 others led first pilgrimage to Kailash–Manasarovar after 1962 Sino-Indian War.

== National politics ==
In 2000, he was unanimously elected as President of Uttarakhand Pradesh Congress Committee, and remained so until he was replaced by Yashpal Arya. In 2002, he was elected as a member of the Rajya Sabha, the upper house of Indian parliament.

In the 2009 general election, he left his traditional stronghold of Almora after it became a reserved seat post delimitation to contest from Haridwar, and won the election by a margin of over 1,27,000 votes. However, his wife Renuka Rawat lost in 2014 Indian general election from Haridwar by a margin of over 1.7 lakh votes.

== Chief Minister of Uttarakhand ==
In February 2014, Rawat took the oath of office as Chief Minister of Uttarakhand when Vijay Bahuguna resigned due to criticism of his handling of rehabilitation after June 2013 floods. In July 2014, he won a by-election from Dharchula assembly seat by over 20,000 votes after Harish Singh Dhami vacated his seat.

On 18 March 2016, nine Congress MLAs rebelled against Rawat, reducing the Congress-led Government to a minority. The Union Government decided to impose President's Rule in the state, and the order was signed by President Pranab Mukherjee on 27 March 2016. He was later reinstated as Chief Minister on 11 May 2016 after winning the trust vote. On 11 March, Congress under the leadership of Harish Rawat lost the 2017 Assembly Elections to BJP. He was also defeated from the two seats (Haridwar Rural and Kichha) from which he contested.

== Later years ==
In 2019, he lost the Indian general election from Nainital-Udhamsingh Nagar Lok Sabha constituency by a huge margin of 3,39,096 vote. In 2022 under his leadership the Congress lost the 2022 Assembly Elections to BJP for a second consecutive time. He was also defeated from Lalkuan where he contested.

== Personal life ==
Harish Rawat is married to Renuka Rawat. They have three children together. Harish Rawat is also a member of the Congress Working Committee. One of his son, Virendra Rawat contested from Haridwar Lok Sabha constituency in the 2024 Indian general election but lost to Trivendra Singh Rawat of the Bharatiya Janata Party by a margin of over 1.66 lakh votes.

== Positions held ==
Year	Description
1980 - 1984	Elected to 7th Lok Sabha: Member, House Committee; Member, Public Accounts Committee
1984 - 1989	Elected to 8th Lok Sabha (2nd term)
1989 - 1991	Elected to 9th Lok Sabha (3rd term): Member, House Committee (1989–91); Member, Committee on Official Language (1990–91); Member, Consultative Committee of Ministry of Communications (1990–91)
2002 - 2008	Elected to Rajya Sabha: Member, Committee on Urban and Rural Development (2003–04); Member, Consultative Committee for the Ministry of Power (2004–08); Member, Indian Council of Agricultural Research Society (2004–08); Member, Committee on MPLADS (Rajya Sabha) (2004–08)
2009 - 2014	Elected to 15th Lok Sabha (4th term): Union Minister of State, Labour and Employment (2009–11); Union Minister of State, Agriculture and Food Processing Industries (2011 - 2012); Union Minister of State, Parliamentary Affairs (2011 - 2012); Union Cabinet Minister, Water Resources (2012–14)
2014 - 2017	Elected to 3rd Uttarakhand Assembly in by election: 8th Chief Minister of Uttarakhand (2014–17)

== Electoral performances ==
=== Lok Sabha ===
Year	Constituency	Result	Vote percentage	Opposition Candidate	Opposition Party	Opposition vote percentage	Ref
1980	Almora	Won	46.31%	Murli Manohar Joshi	JNP	21.27%	
1984	Almora	Won	61.26%	Murli Manohar Joshi	BJP	14.79%	
1989	Almora	Won	42.45%	Kashi Singh Airy	UKD	39.39%	
1991	Almora	Lost	37%	Jeewan Sharma	BJP	45.94%	
1996	Almora	Lost	26.59%	Bachi Singh Rawat	BJP	41.05%	
1998	Almora	Lost	33.60%	Bachi Singh Rawat	BJP	52.39%	
1999	Almora	Lost	45.50%	Bachi Singh Rawat	BJP	48.39%	
2009	Haridwar	Won	42.16%	Swami Yatindranand Giri	BJP	25.99%	
2019	Nainital–Udhamsingh Nagar	Lost	34.41%	Ajay Bhatt	BJP	61.65%	

=== Uttarakhand Legislative Assembly ===
Year	Constituency	Result	Vote percentage	Opposition Candidate	Opposition Party	Opposition vote percentage	Ref
2014 (Bye Elect)	Dharchula	Won	72.83%	Vishnu Dutt	BJP	24.75%	
2017	Haridwar Rural	Lost	33.28%	Yatishwaranand	BJP	45.78%	
2017	Kichha	Lost	43.66%	Rajesh Shukla	BJP	45.77%	
2022	Lalkuan	Lost	33.08%	M. S. Bisht	BJP	53.23%	

Lok Sabha
Preceded by Murli Manohar Joshi	Member of Parliament for Almora; 1980 – 1991	Succeeded by Jeewan Sharma
Preceded by Rajendra Kumar Badi	Member of Parliament for Haridwar; 2009 – 2014	Succeeded by Ramesh Pokhriyal
Rajya Sabha
Preceded by Manohar Kant Dhyani	Member of Parliament for Rajya Sabha Uttarakhand; 2002 – 2008	Succeeded by Bhagat Singh Koshyari
Political offices
Preceded by Pawan Kumar Bansal	Union Minister of Water Resources; 2012 – 2014	Succeeded by Uma Bharti
Preceded by Vijay Bahuguna	Chief Minister of Uttarakhand; 1 February 2014 – 27 March 2016	Succeeded by President's Rule
Preceded by President's Rule	Chief Minister of Uttarakhand; 21 April 2016 – 22 April 2016	Succeeded by President's Rule
Preceded by President's Rule	Chief Minister of Uttarakhand; 11 May 2016 – 18 Mar 2017	Succeeded by Trivendra Singh Rawat
Party political offices
Preceded by Office Established	President; Uttarakhand Pradesh Congress Committee; 2000 – 2007	Succeeded by Yashpal Arya
