= Lemon Tree Hotels =

Indian hotel chain

Lemon Tree Hotels Ltd.

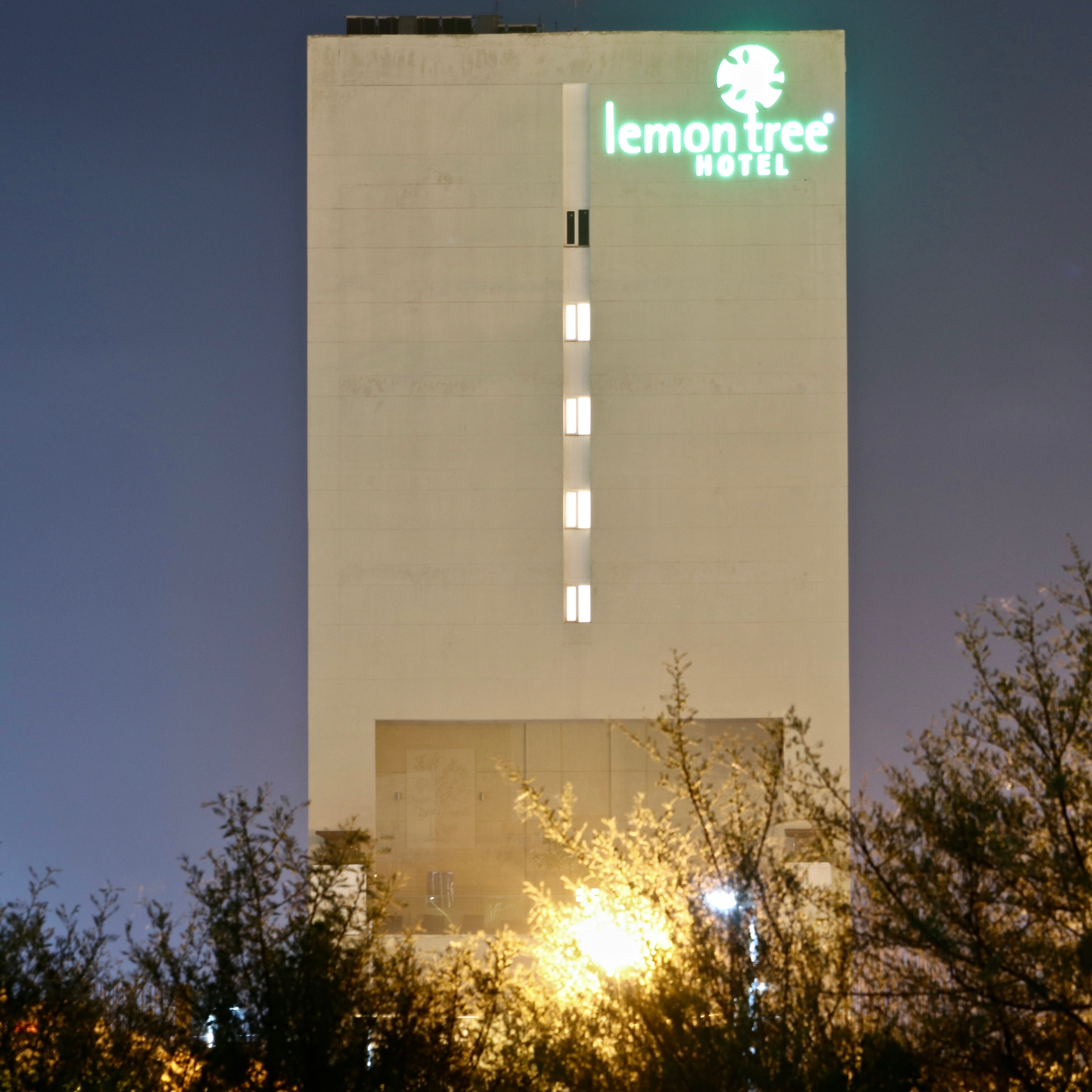
- A Lemon Tree property in Hyderabad
- Type: Public
- Traded as: NSE: LEMONTREE; BSE: 541233
- Industry: Hospitality
- Founded: 2002
- Founder: Patu Keswani
- Headquarters: 6, Aerocity Hospitality District, New Delhi, 110037, India
- Number of locations: 100 hotels (2024)
- Area served: India, Bhutan, Nepal
- Key people: Neelendra Singh (MD)
- Website: Lemon Tree Hotels

Lemon Tree Hotels is an Indian hotel chain. It owns and operates 130+ hotels, 11,700+ rooms and 80+ cities.

According to the Horwath Report, Lemon Tree Hotels is India's largest hotel chain in the mid-priced hotel sector as of 30 June 2017.

== History ==
Lemon Tree Hotels was founded in 2002 by Patu Keswani. It opened its first hotel with 49 rooms in May 2004.

In 2019, the company acquired Berggruen Hotels Private Limited for an enterprise value of ₹ 600 crores. At the time of acquisition, Berggruen Hotels owned 936 rooms and managed 975 rooms under the "Keys" brand in 21 cities across India.

Lemon Tree Hotels Limited went public and was listed on the National Stock Exchange of India and Bombay Stock Exchange on 9 April 2018.

== Operations ==
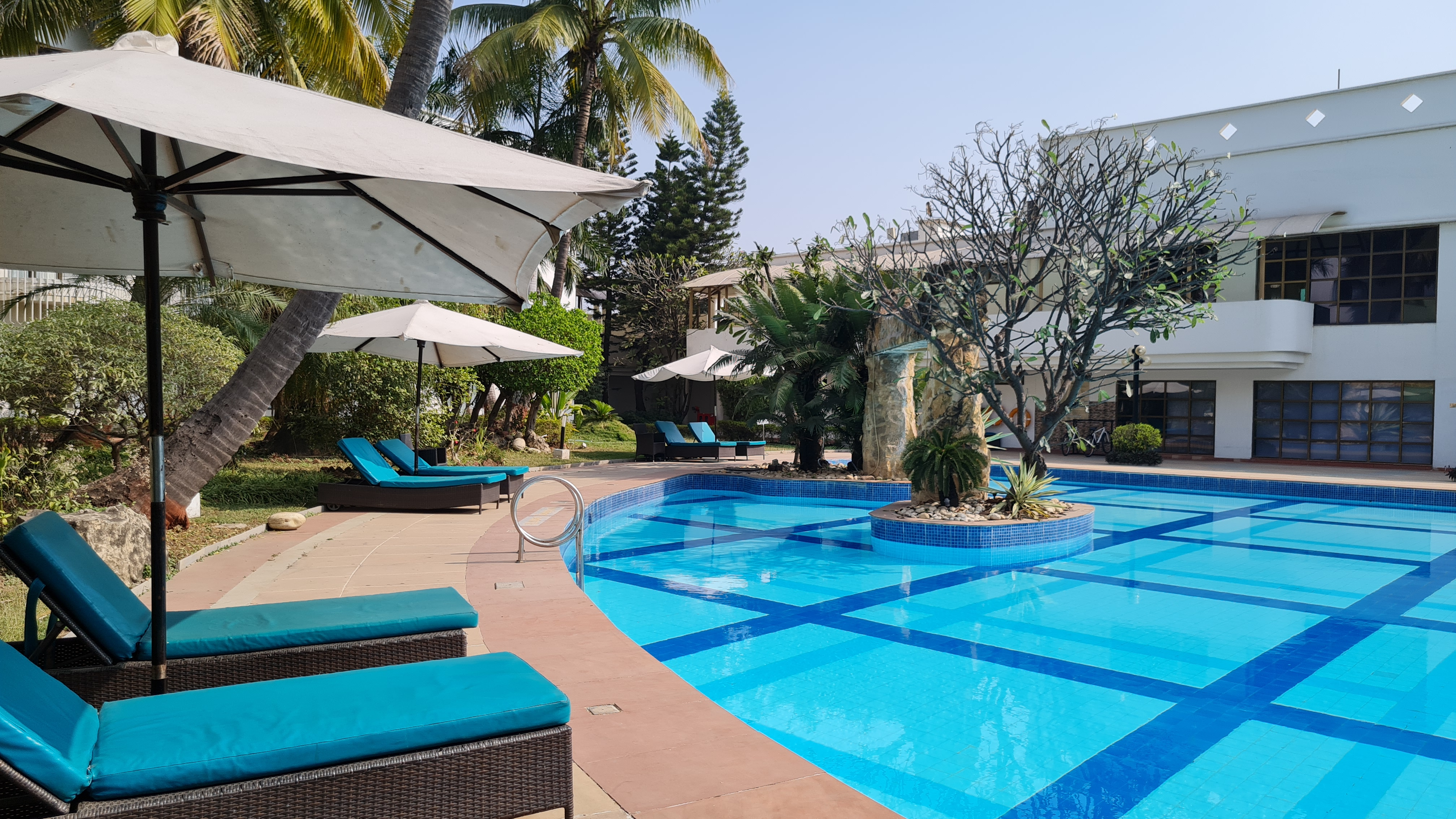
A Lemon Tree hotel in Aurangabad

The company operates under 7 brands, namely Aurika Hotels and Resorts, Lemon Tree Premier, Lemon Tree Hotels, Red Fox by Lemon Tree Hotels, Keys Prima, Keys Select, and Keys Lite.
