= Bharati Ray =

Indian politician

Member of Parliament of Rajya Sabha
- In office 1996–2002
- Constituency: West Bengal

Personal details
- Born: 26 July 1934 New Delhi, British India
- Party: Communist Party of India (Marxist)
- Spouse: Sukhendu Ray
- Children: 1 Son and 2 daughters

Bharati Ray (née Sengupta ; born 26 July 1934) is an Indian politician. She was elected to the Rajya Sabha the Upper house of Indian Parliament from West Bengal as a member of the Communist Party of India (Marxist).
