= W. Angou Singh =

Indian politician

Singh W Angou (born 5 July 1936) an Indian politician from Manipur and member of the Indian National Congress.

He was Member of the Rajya Sabha for the term, 10 April 1996 to 9 April 2002 from Manipur and was chairman, Government Assurance Committee.

He has been elected to the Manipur Legislative Assembly during 1980-1995 where he served as Deputy Speaker from 1981 to 1984 and Speaker from 1985 to 1988.

His father is Shri W. Ibochouba Singh. He is married to Shrimati Loidang Leima Devi and has two daughters. He is resides at Lairenjam Awang Leekai, B.P.O. Laiphrakom, West Imphal district, (Manipur).
