= Bratin Sengupta =

Indian politician

Member of Parliament, Rajya Sabha
- In office 1996-2002
- Constituency: West Bengal

Personal details
- Born: 13 August 1963 (age 62)
- Party: Bharatiya Janata Party
- Other political affiliations: Communist Party of India (Marxist)
- Spouse: Nila Sengupta

Bratin Sengupta (born 13 August 1963 in Calcutta, West Bengal) is an Indian politician and member of the Bharatiya Janata Party. He was a Member of Parliament, representing West Bengal in the Rajya Sabha as a member of the Communist Party of India (Marxist).
