= K. M. Saifullah =

Indian politician

K.M. Saifullah
- కే.ఎం. సైఫుల్లా
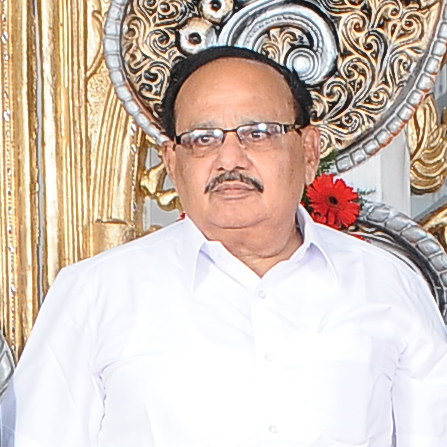
- K.M. Saifullah

Member of Parliament, Rajya Sabha
- In office 10 April 1996 – 9 April 2002

Vice Chairman, Anantapur Municipality
- In office 1987–1989

Personal details
- Born: 11 August 1944 (age 82) Anantapur, Andhra Pradesh State, India
- Party: Telugu Desam Party
- Spouse: Late Shrimati Ayesha
- Children: Late. K.M.Rahamatullah; K.M. Zakiullah
- Parents: Late Shri K.M. Rahamatullah (Ex -M.P.); Late. Shrimati Rahamatunisa
- Education: Sri Krishnadevaraya University
- Profession: Lawyer; Farmer

Kammur Mohammed Saifullah, is a politician of the Telugu Desam Party, and was Member of Parliament of India representing Andhra Pradesh in the Rajya Sabha(1996-2002), the upper house of the Indian Parliament. During his tenure as MP, he brought many issues for discussion in the upper house.

== Early life and education ==
K.M. Saifullah was born on 11 August 1944 in Anantapur of Andhra Pradesh. His father Late. K.M.Rahamatullah was also a Member of Parliament before Indian independence. Saifullah completed his B.A, B.L in Sri Krishnadevaraya University, Anantapur (Andhra Pradesh).

== Political life ==
Saifullah joined Telugu Desam Party in 1983 during NTR wave in Andhra politics. He served as vice chairman in Anantapur Municipality from 1987 to 1989. He resigned the post of vice chairman to contest assembly elections held during 1989. He was defeated in assembly elections held in 1989 from Anantapur constituency.

In recognition to his continuous public serving capabilities, N. Chandrababu Naidu elevated him to the post of M.P. He was elected as Member of parliament(RS) from Andhra Pradesh state on 10 April 1996 from Telugu Desam Party. He served a full six-year term as M.P.
