= Pramod Nainwal =

Indian politician

Dr. Pramod Nainwal
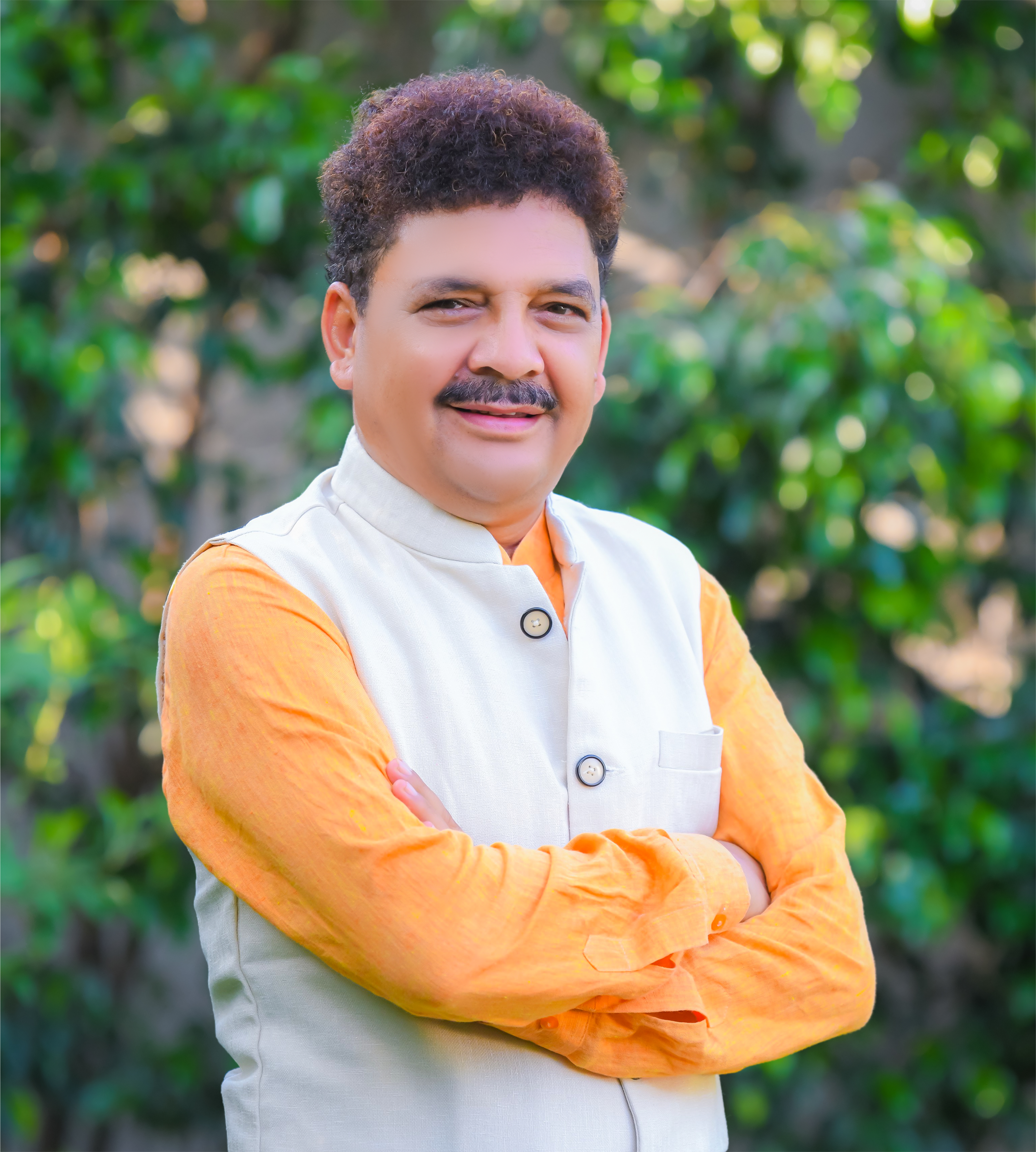

Member of Uttarakhand Legislative Assembly
- Incumbent
- Assumed office 10 March 2022
- Preceded by: Karan Mahara
- Constituency: Ranikhet

Personal details
- Born: 18 May 1971 (age 54) Ranikhet, Uttarakhand, India
- Party: Bharatiya Janata Party

Pramod Nainwal is an Indian politician from Uttarakhand and a Member of the Uttarakhand Legislative Assembly. He represents the Ranikhet Constituency. Pramod is a member of the Bharatiya Janata Party.

== Political Life and career ==
Pramod Nainwal was born in a Bhatrojkhan in Ranikhet and educated at the village school.

== Electoral performance ==
Election	Constituency	Party	Result	Votes %	Opposition Candidate	Opposition Party	Opposition vote %	Ref
2022	Ranikhet	BJP	Won	50.05%	Karan Mahara	INC	43.90%	
2017	Ranikhet	Independent	Lost	13.85%	Karan Mahara	INC	46.23%	
