= Parwati Das =

Indian politician

Parwati Das is an Indian politician. She is currently serving as a member of the Uttarakhand Legislative Assembly from the Bageshwar Assembly constituency. She is the ninth female MLA in the assembly and the fifth MLA of the Bharatiya Janata Party from the Bageshwar constituency. She is the wife of former MLA Chandan Ram Das.
