= Bageshwar Assembly constituency =

Constituency of the Uttarakhand legislative assembly in India

Coordinates: 29.84°N 79.77°E

Bageshwar
- Constituency No. 47 for the Uttarakhand Legislative Assembly

Constituency details
- Country: India
- Region: North India
- State: Uttarakhand
- District: Bageshwar
- Lok Sabha constituency: Almora
- Total electors: 118,311
- Reservation: SC

Member of Legislative Assembly
- 5th Uttarakhand Legislative Assembly
- Incumbent Parwati Das
- Party: Bharatiya Janata Party
- Elected year: 2023

Bageshwar Legislative Assembly constituency is one of the 70 assembly constituencies of Uttarakhand; a northern state of India. Bageshwar is part of Almora Lok Sabha constituency.

== Members of Legislative Assembly ==
Election	Name	Party
1967	Gopal Ram Das	Indian National Congress
1969	Saraswati Devi	Indian National Congress
1974	Saraswati Devi	Indian National Congress
1977	Puran Chand	Janata Party
1980	Gopal Ram Das	Indian National Congress
1985	Gopal Ram Das	Indian National Congress
1989	Gopal Ram Das	Indian National Congress
1991	Puran Chand	Bharatiya Janata Party
1993	Ram Prasad Tamta	Indian National Congress
1996	Narayan Ram Das	Bharatiya Janata Party
Became part of Uttarakhand Legislative Assembly
2002	Ram Prasad Tamta	Indian National Congress
2007	Chandan Ram Das	Bharatiya Janata Party
2012	Chandan Ram Das	Bharatiya Janata Party
2017	Chandan Ram Das	Bharatiya Janata Party
2022	Chandan Ram Das	Bharatiya Janata Party
2023^	Parwati Das	Bharatiya Janata Party

- ^by-election

== Election results ==
=== 2027 Assembly election ===
2027 Uttarakhand Legislative Assembly election: Bageshwar
Party	Candidate	Votes	%	±%
INC				
BJP				
NOTA	None of the above			
Majority				
Turnout				
gain from		Swing		

=== 2023 by-election ===
Uttarakhand Legislative Assembly by-election, 2023: Bageshwar
Party	Candidate	Votes	%	±%
BJP	Parwati Das	33,247	49.54	▲6.4
INC	Basant Kumar	30,842	45.96	▲19.08
NOTA	None of the Above	1,257	1.87	▲0.71
UKD	Arjun Kumar Dev	857	1.28	New
SP	Bhagwati Prasad	637	0.95	▲0.27
Majority		2,405	3.58	▼12.68
Turnout		67,108	55.44	N/A
BJP hold		Swing		

=== Assembly Election 2022 ===
2022 Uttarakhand Legislative Assembly election: Bageshwar
Party	Candidate	Votes	%	±%
BJP	Chandan Ram Das	32,211	43.14%	▼6.74
INC	Ranjeet Das	20,070	26.88%	▼1.50
AAP	Basant Kumar	16,109	21.57%	New
Independent	Bharav Nath Tamta	1,877	2.51%	New
Independent	Balkrishna	1,512	2.02%	New
NOTA	None of the Above	864	1.16%	▼1.12
Independent	Dinesh Ram	798	1.07%	New
BSP	Om Prakash	722	0.97%	▼15.32
SP	Laxmi Devi	508	0.68%	New
Margin of victory		12,141	16.26%	▼5.24
Turnout		74,671	61.96%	▲1.84
Registered electors		1,20,524		▲6.93
BJP hold		Swing	▼6.74	

=== Assembly Election 2017 ===
2017 Uttarakhand Legislative Assembly election: Bageshwar
Party	Candidate	Votes	%	±%
BJP	Chandan Ram Das	33,792	49.88%	▲10.98
INC	Balkrishan	19,225	28.38%	▼7.34
BSP	Basant Kumar	11,038	16.29%	▼0.13
NOTA	None of the Above	1,541	2.27%	New
UKD	Jeevan Lal	1,207	1.78%	▼1.35
Independent	Bachi Lal	676	1.00%	New
Margin of victory		14,567	21.50%	▲18.32
Turnout		67,753	60.11%	▼0.62
Registered electors		1,12,712		▲13.81
BJP hold		Swing	▲10.98	

=== Assembly Election 2012 ===
2012 Uttarakhand Legislative Assembly election: Bageshwar
Party	Candidate	Votes	%	±%
BJP	Chandan Ram Das	23,396	38.90%	▼3.86
INC	Ram Prasad Tamta	21,485	35.72%	▲7.26
BSP	Bahadur Ram Dhauni	9,877	16.42%	▲10.07
UKD	Kamaljeet Narayan Das	1,883	3.13%	▼14.65
Sainik Samaj Party	Jagdish Prasad Tamta	1,212	2.01%	New
Independent	Deep Chandra Arya	996	1.66%	New
Independent	Deep Chandra	738	1.23%	New
SP	Hari Ram Shastry	544	0.90%	▼1.32
Margin of victory		1,911	3.18%	▼11.12
Turnout		60,150	60.74%	▼4.34
Registered electors		99,035		▲56.43
BJP hold		Swing	▼3.86	

=== Assembly Election 2007 ===
2007 Uttarakhand Legislative Assembly election: Bageshwar
Party	Candidate	Votes	%	±%
BJP	Chandan Ram Das	17,614	42.75%	▲11.47
INC	Ram Prasad Tamta	11,724	28.46%	▼9.48
UKD	Govind Ram	7,325	17.78%	▲3.69
BSP	Sri Ram	2,615	6.35%	▼3.97
BJSH	Harish Prasad	1,006	2.44%	New
SP	Bhagwati Prasad	916	2.22%	▼1.03
Margin of victory		5,890	14.30%	▲7.65
Turnout		41,200	65.10%	▲5.68
Registered electors		63,310		▲14.87
BJP gain from INC		Swing	▲4.82	

=== Assembly Election 2002 ===
2002 Uttaranchal Legislative Assembly election: Bageshwar
Party	Candidate	Votes	%	±%
INC	Ram Prasad Tamta	12,419	37.93%	New
BJP	Narayan Ram Das	10,242	31.28%	New
UKD	Lachham Ram	4,611	14.08%	New
BSP	Narendra Kumar	3,376	10.31%	New
SP	Mathura Prasad	1,066	3.26%	New
Independent	Leela Devi	1,024	3.13%	New
Margin of victory		2,177	6.65%	
Turnout		32,738	59.43%	
Registered electors		55,116		
INC win (new seat)				

== See also ==
- Almora (Lok Sabha constituency)
