= Lalit Pharswan =

Indian politician

Lalit Mohan Singh Farswan

Member of Legislative Assembly for Kapkot
- In office 2012–2017

Personal details
- Party: Indian National Congress

Lalit Mohan Singh Farswan is an Indian politician from Uttarakhand and a one term Member of the Uttarakhand Legislative Assembly. Farswan represented the Kapkot Assembly constituency from 2012 to 2017. Farswan is a member of the Indian National Congress.

Lalit Farswan was defeated in the 2022 Uttarakhand Legislative Assembly election by Suresh Gariya of Bhartiya Janata Party by a margin of 4046 votes.

== Positions held ==
| Year | Description |
|---|---|
| 2012 - 2017 | Elected to 3rd Uttarakhand Assembly: Member - Committee on Government Assurances (2012–13); Member - Committee on PSE and Corporate (2012–14); Member - Public Accounts Committee (2013–14); Member - Committee on Housing (2013–14) |

== Elections contested ==
| Year | Constituency | Result | Vote percentage | Opposition Candidate | Opposition Party | Opposition vote percentage | Ref |
