= Rekha Arya =

Indian politician

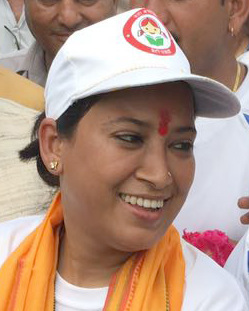

Minister of the Woman and Child Welfare, Government of Uttarakhand
- Incumbent
- Assumed office 18 March 2017

Member of Uttarakhand Legislative Assembly
- Incumbent
- Assumed office 25 July 2014
- Preceded by: Ajay Tamta
- Constituency: Someshwar

Personal details
- Born: 15 December 1978 (age 47) Almora, Uttarakhand, India
- Party: BJP
- Spouse: Girdharilal Sahu

Rekha Arya (born 15 December 1978) is an Indian politician from Uttarakhand. She is an MLA representing Bharatiya Janata Party from Someshwar Assembly constituency, which is reserved for Scheduled Caste community, in Almora District. She is also the cabinet minister for Women and Child Welfare in the Government of Uttarakhand.

== Early life and education ==
Arya is from Someshwar, Almora District, Uttarakhand. She married Girdhari Lal Sahu. She completed her M.Com. at Kumaon University, Nainital and also did her B.Ed. at the same university in 2002.

== Career ==
She won from Someshwar Assembly constituency representing Bharatiya Janata Party in the 2022 Uttarakhand Legislative Assembly election. She polled 26,161 votes and defeated her nearest rival, Rajendra Barakoti of Indian National Congress, by a margin of 5,293 votes. Earlier, she became an MLA for the first time winning the 2014 Uttarakhand Legislative Assembly bye election and retained the seat in the 2017 Uttarakhand Legislative Assembly election. defeating the same candidate, Barakoti of INC, by a narrow margin of 710 votes. In the 2012 Uttarakhand Legislative Assembly election she lost an independent candidate from the same Someshwar constituency.to Ajay Tamta.

== Electoral performance ==
Election	Constituency	Party	Result	Votes %	Opposition Candidate	Opposition Party	Opposition vote %	Ref
2022	Someshwar	BJP	Won	52.09%	Rajendra Barakoti	INC	41.55%	
2017	Someshwar	BJP	Won	47.23%	Rajendra Barakoti	INC	45.69%	
2014 By-election	Someshwar	INC	Won	61.14%	Mohan Ram Arya	BJP	34.71%	0
2012	Someshwar	Independent	Lost	33.29%	Ajay Tamta	BJP	39.43%	
