= Ajay Tamta =

Indian politician

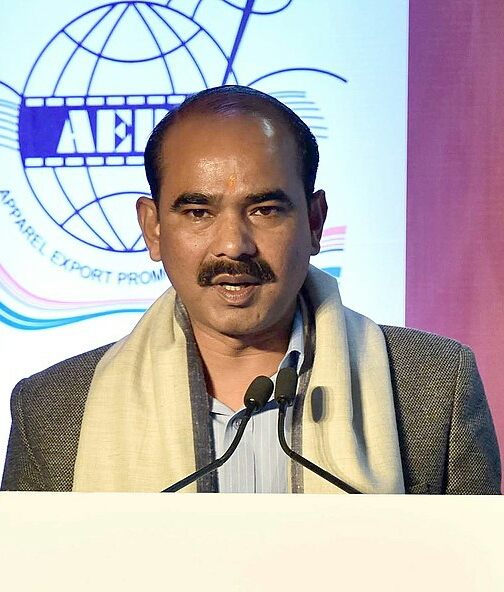

Minister of State for Road Transport and Highways
- Incumbent
- Assumed office 11 June 2024
- Prime Minister: Narendra Modi
- Minister: Nitin Gadkari

Minister of State for Textiles
- In office 6 July 2016 – 24 May 2019
- Prime Minister: Narendra Modi

Member of Parliament, Lok Sabha
- Incumbent
- Assumed office 16 May 2014
- Preceded by: Pradeep Tamta
- Constituency: Almora

Member of Uttarakhand Legislative Assembly
- In office 2007–2014
- Preceded by: Pradeep Tamta
- Succeeded by: Rekha Arya
- Constituency: Someshwar

Personal details
- Born: 16 July 1972 (age 54)
- Party: Bharatiya Janata Party
- Spouse: Sonal Tamta
- Occupation: Politician

Ajay Tamta (born 16 July 1972) is a politician from Uttarakhand, India. He represents Bharatiya Janata Party serving as a Minister of State in the Ministry of Road Transport and Highways. He had also served as Minister of State for Textiles and is Member of Parliament (MP) from Almora constituency.

He contested 2009 Lok Sabha elections from Almora of Uttarakhand but lost. He was elected as member of Uttarakhand Legislative Assembly from Someshwar, Almora in 2012 elections as a member of Bharatiya Janata Party. He is the member of Lok Sabha since 2014.

In 2024 Indian general election, he won again with the margin of 234097 votes from the Almora.

== Career ==
He started his political career by contesting in the district panchayat and he became a district panchayat member in 1996, that same year he was also elected as the vice-president of the panchayat.

Tamta unsuccessfully campaigned as an independent in the 2002 Assembly elections for the Someshwar seat. On the BJP banner, he ran again in 2007 and was able to obtain entry into the Dehradun Assembly.

He fought the Lok Sabha elections for the first time in 2009, but he lost. 2012 marked his first legislative victory when he won from the Someshwar constituency.

He fought the Lok Sabha elections in 2014, which he won. In the Lok Sabha elections of 2019, he repeated his victory again.

Tamta was elected to the Uttarakhand Legislative Assembly twice, first in 2007 and then again in 2012. Additionally, he has held positions in the Uttarakhand government as a Minister of State from 2007 to 2008 and as the Cabinet Minister from 2008 to 2009.

During the first Modi administration, he was the Union Minister of State for Textiles.

== Electoral performance ==
Election	Constituency	Party	Result	Votes %	Opposition Candidate	Opposition Party	Opposition vote %	Ref
2002	Someshwar	Independent	Lost	4.84%	Pradeep Tamta	INC	34.39%	
2007	Someshwar	BJP	Won	46.00%	Pradeep Tamta	INC	41.64%	
2012	Someshwar	BJP	Won	39.43%	Rekha Arya	Independent	33.29%	
2014	Almora	BJP	Won	53.00%	Pradeep Tamta	INC	38.44%	
2019	Almora	BJP	Won	64.03%	Pradeep Tamta	INC	30.48%	
2024	Almora	BJP	Won	64.2%	Pradeep Tamta	INC	29.18%	

== See also ==
- Third Modi ministry
