= Kapkot =

- town
- Location in Uttarakhand, India Kapkot (India)
- Coordinates: 29.90°N 79.85°E
- Country: India
- State: Uttarakhand
- District: Bageshwar
- Elevation: 1,150 m (3,770 ft)

Languages
  - Official: Hindi
- Time zone: UTC+5:30 (IST)
- Vehicle registration: UK
- Website: http://www.bageshwar.nic.in

Kapkot or Kapkote is a town in Bageshwar district, Uttarakhand, India. It houses the headquarters of Kapkot Tehsil, the largest administrative subdivision of Bageshwar district. It is known for being the last bus terminus on the route to Pindari Glacier. Kapkot is located almost 25 kilometres (16 mi) from its district headquarters at Bageshwar.

== History ==
The area that is now Kapkot was ruled by the Katyuris until the 16th century. Kapkot is first mentioned as a village located in Danpur Pargana of Kumaon District, British India. By the start of the 20th century, The London Missionary Society had a station, with a school and a dispensary at Kapkot. The British system of administration was abolished when India became independent in 1947 and Kapkot was assigned to the northern part of Almora tehsil in Almora district. The Kapkot tehsil was created on 12 September 1997, by transferring 214 villages of tahsil Bageshwar of Almora district.

== Geography ==
Kapkot is located at 29.9379° N, 79.9025° E. It has an average elevation of 1,150 metres (3,770 ft). It lies on the banks of the Sarayu River, which runs to the west of the town. The land in and around Kapkot is utilised largely for agricultural activity, which is fostered by water from the Saryu. The topography is marked by valleys, local depression and high ground.

Kapkot is cold and dry for eight months of the year. Cold winds are experienced during February and March. The hottest months are from March to July. The village experiences a moderate climate from August to October, tempered by heavy rain and thundershowers, and a slightly cooler climate from November to February. Fog and dew are very common, occurring often during the winter season. The town is situated in an area prone to landslides.

== Demographics ==
According to the 2011 census of India, the area covered by the Kapkot had a population of 2858 with a sex-ratio of 1011 females for every 1,000 males, much above the national and state average of 929 and 963 respectively. A total of 414 were under the age of six, constituting 293 males and 191 females. Scheduled Castes and Scheduled Tribes accounted for 31.39% and 1.12% of the population respectively. The average literacy rate of the town was 81.91%, compared to the national average of 72.99%. The population is predominantly rural with high concentration of people belonging to Scheduled Castes.

According to the religious census of 2011, Kapkot had 85.8% Hindus, 8.5% Muslims, 5.2% Christians and 0.5% others. Kumaoni is spoken by most, and the standard dialect is the Danpuriya dialect.

== Government and politics ==
Kapkot is administrated by a chairman, who is an elected representative. The town is divided into a number of wards. It is represented in the Uttarakhand Legislative Assembly by a member elected from the Kapkot constituency.

== Transport ==
Kapkot is connected to Bageshwar by Uttarakhand State Highway 37. Another road connects Kapkot to Tejam and further to Thal and Munsiari. Bus services to Bageshwar started in 1955–58.

== Education ==
Industrial training institute was opened in 2007.

- Saryu Valley Public School
- Government Inter College
- Government PG College
- Swami Vivekanand Inter College
- Pinewood International Academy, Panora, Kapkot
- Rajputra Vidya Mandir
- Countrywide Public School, Bagheli, Ason
- Him Saryu Bal Vidya Mandir
- Angels Academy
- Gerjil Heritage Public School

== See also ==
- Kanda
