= Suresh Keswani =

Indian politician

Member of Parliament (Rajya Sabha)
- In office 1996–2002
- Constituency: Maharashtra

Personal details
- Born: June 20, 1942 (age 83) Atalrai, Larkana, Sindh, British India
- Party: Independent
- Spouse: Shankuntala
- Children: 1 Son

Suresh Atalrai Keswani is an Indian politician. He was a member of the Rajya Sabha, the upper house of the Parliament of India representing Maharashtra as an independent candidate.
