= Manohar Kant Dhyani =

Bharatiya Janata Party politician

MP of Rajya Sabha for Uttarakhand
- In office 26 November 1996 – 25 November 2002
- Succeeded by: Harish Rawat, INC

Personal details
- Born: 7 July 1942 (age 83) Ranakot, United Provinces, British India
- Party: BJP
- Spouse: Rama Devi
- Children: 5 (four sons, one daughter)

Manohar Kant Dhyani (born 7 July 1942), is a Bharatiya Janata Party politician and a former member of the Rajya Sabha from Uttarakhand, in northern India.
