= Bachi Singh Rawat =

Indian politician (1949–2021)

Member of Parliament, Lok Sabha
- In office 1996-2009
- Preceded by: Jeewan Sharma
- Succeeded by: Pradeep Tamta
- Constituency: Almora

Personal details
- Born: 1 August 1949 Almora, Uttarakhand
- Died: 18 April 2021 (aged 71) Rishikesh, Uttarakhand
- Party: BJP
- Spouse: Champa Rawat
- Children: 1 son, Shashank Rawat

Bachi Singh Rawat (1 August 1949 – 18 April 2021), was an Indian politician from the Bharatiya Janata Party (BJP). He was a member of the 14th Lok Sabha of India and a 4 time MP. He represented the Almora constituency of Uttarakhand.

He had to shift base to Nainital for the 15th Lok Sabha, as Almora was designated a reserved constituency. He however lost the Election to K. C. Singh Baba (INC).

Rawat died on 18 April 2021, aged 71 due to COVID-19.

== Early life and education ==
Bachi Singh Rawat was born in Thapla village, near Ranikhet, Almora district.

He graduated in Law from Lucknow University and went on to get a master's degree in Economics from Agra University.

== Positions held ==
- 1991 – 92 and 1993 – 95: Member, Uttar Pradesh Legislative Assembly (two terms)
- 1991 – 92: Member, Library Committee
- Aug – Dec 1992: Deputy Minister, Revenue, Uttar Pradesh
- 1994 – 95: Member, Education Committee and Member, Planning Committee
- 1996: Elected to 11th Lok Sabha
- 1996 – 97: Member, Committee on Food, Civil Supplies and Public Distribution and Member, Consultative Committee, Ministry of Communications
- 1997 – 98: Member, House Committee
- 1998: Re-elected to 12th Lok Sabha (2nd term)
- 1998 – 99: Member, Committee on Defence and its Sub-Committee-II and Member, Committee on Absence of Members from the Sittings of the House and Member, Committee on Provision of Computers to Members of Parliament and Member, Consultative Committee, Ministry of Information and Broadcasting
- 1999: Re-elected to 13th Lok Sabha (3rd term)
- Oct – Nov 1999: Union Minister of State, Defence
- 22 Nov 1999–2004: Union Minister of State, Department of Science and Technology, Ministry of Science and Technology
- 2004–2009: Re-elected to 14th Lok Sabha (4th term)
- 2007–2009: President, BJP Uttarakhand
- 2011–2012: Chairman, BJP Committee of Manifesto, 2012 Uttarakhand Assembly Elections
