= List of speakers of the Uttarakhand Legislative Assembly =

Presiding officer of Uttarakhand vidhan sabha

Speaker of the Uttarakhand Legislative Assembly

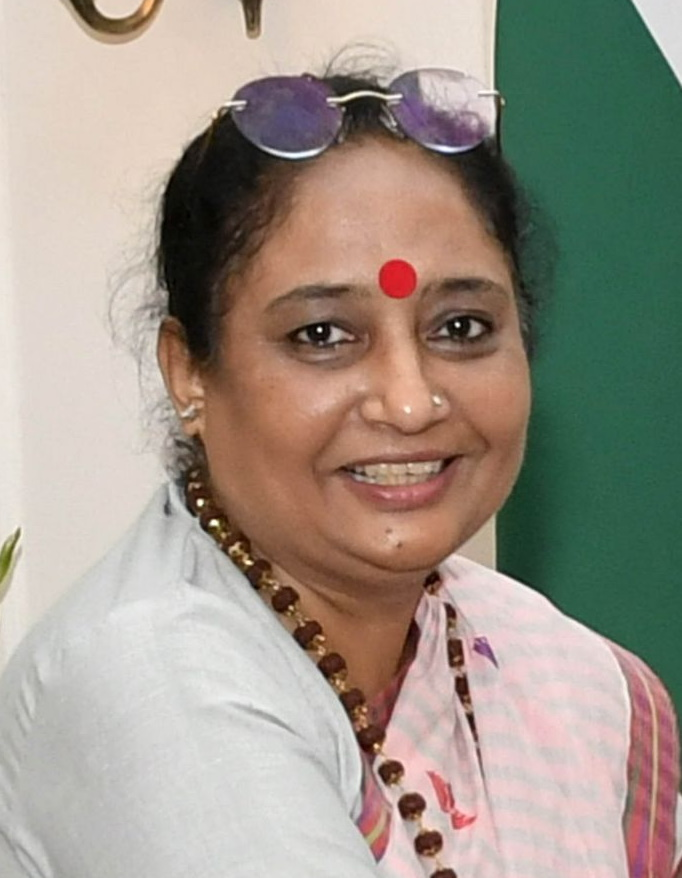
- Incumbent; Ritu Khanduri Bhushan since 26 March 2022
- Uttarakhand Legislative Assembly
- Style: The Honourable
- Nominator: Members of the Uttarakhand Legislative Assembly
- Appointer: Governor of Uttarakhand
- Term length: During the life of the Assembly (five years maximum); Renewable
- Precursor: List of speakers of the Uttar Pradesh Legislative Assembly
- Inaugural holder: Prakash Pant (2000–2002)
- Formation: 9 November 2000; 25 years ago
- Deputy: Vacant
- Website: Uttarakhand Legislative Assembly

The Speaker of the Uttarakhand Legislative Assembly is the presiding officer of the Legislative Assembly of Uttarakhand, the main law-making body for the Indian state of Uttarakhand. The Speaker is elected in the first meeting of the Uttarakhand Legislative Assembly after the general elections for a term of 5 years from amongst the members of the assembly. The Speaker must be a member of the assembly. The Speaker can be removed from office by a resolution passed in the assembly by an effective majority of its members. In the absence of Speaker, the meeting of Uttarakhand Legislative Assembly is presided by the Deputy Speaker.

== Eligibility ==
The Speaker of the Assembly must:

1. be a citizen of India;
2. be at least 25 years of age; and
3. not hold any office of profit under the Government of Uttarakhand.

== Powers and Functions of the Speaker ==
The speaker of the legislative assembly conducts the business in house, and decides whether a bill is a money bill or not. They maintain discipline and decorum in the house and can punish a member for their unruly behaviour by suspending them. They also permit the moving of various kinds of motions and resolutions such as a motion of no confidence, motion of adjournment, motion of censure and calling attention notice as per the rules. The speaker decides on the agenda to be taken up for discussion during the meeting. The date of election of the speaker is fixed by the Governor of Uttarakhand. Further, all comments and speeches made by members of the House are addressed to the speaker. The speaker is answerable to the house. Both the speaker and deputy speaker may be removed by a resolution passed by the majority of the members. ==List of the Speakers of Uttar Pradesh==

| No | Portrait | Name | Constituency | Term | | | Assembly | Party |
|---|---|---|---|---|---|---|---|---|
| 1 | | Purushottam Das Tandon | | 31 July 1937 | 10 August 1950 | 13 years, 10 days | | Indian National Congress |
| 2 | | Nafisul Hasan | | 21 December 1950 | 19 May 1952 | 1 year, 150 days | | Indian National Congress |
| 3 | | Atmaram Govind Kher | Garautha | 20 May 1952 | 4 April 1957 | 9 years, 310 days | 1st | Indian National Congress |
| 3 | | Atmaram Govind Kher | Garautha | 4 April 1957 | 26 March 1962 | 9 years, 310 days | 2nd | Indian National Congress |
| 4 | | Madan Mohan Verma | Faizabad | 26 March 1962 | 16 March 1967 | 4 years, 355 days | 3rd | Indian National Congress |
| 5 | | Jagdish Saran Agarwal | Bareilly City | 17 March 1967 | 16 March 1969 | 1 year, 364 days | 4th | Indian National Congress |
| (3) | | Atmaram Govind Kher | Garautha | 17 March 1969 | 18 March 1974 | 5 years, 1 day | 5th | Indian National Congress |
| 6 | | Vasudev Singh | Gadwara | 18 March 1974 | 12 July 1977 | 3 years, 116 days | 6th | Indian National Congress |
| 7 | | Banarasi Das | Hapur | 12 July 1977 | 26 February 1979 | 1 year, 229 days | 7th | Janata Party |
| 8 | | Sripati Mishra | Isauli | 7 July 1980 | 18 July 1982 | 2 years, 11 days | 8th | Indian National Congress |
| 9 | | Dharam Singh (INC politician) | | 25 August 1982 | 15 March 1985 | 2 years, 202 days | 8th | Indian National Congress |
| 10 | | Niyaz Hasan Khan | Kunda | 15 March 1985 | 9 January 1990 | 4 years, 300 days | 9th | Indian National Congress |
| 11 | | Harikishan Srivastava | Chaubepur | 9 January 1990 | 30 July 1991 | 1 year, 202 days | 10th | Janata Dal |
| 12 | | Keshari Nath Tripathi | Allahabad South | 30 July 1991 | 15 December 1993 | 2 years, 138 days | 11th | Bharatiya Janata Party |
| 13 | | Dhaniram Verma | Bidhuna | 15 December 1993 | 20 June 1995 | 1 year, 187 days | 12th | Samajwadi Party |
| 14 | | Barkhu Ram Verma | Sagri | 18 July 1995 | 26 March 1997 | 1 year, 251 days | 12th | Bahujan Samaj Party |
| (12) | | Keshari Nath Tripathi | Allahabad South | 27 March 1997 | 14 May 2002 | 7 years, 53 days | 13th | Bharatiya Janata Party |
| (12) | | Keshari Nath Tripathi | Allahabad South | 14 May 2002 | 19 May 2004 | 7 years, 53 days | 14th | Bharatiya Janata Party |
| 15 | | Mata Prasad Pandey | Itwa | 26 July 2004 | 18 May 2007 | 2 years, 296 days | 14th | Samajwadi Party |
| 16 | | Sukhdev Rajbhar | Lalganj | 18 May 2007 | 13 April 2012 | 4 years, 331 days | 15th | Bahujan Samaj Party |
| (15) | | Mata Prasad Pandey | Itwa | 13 April 2012 | 30 March 2017 | 4 years, 351 days | 16th | Samajwadi Party |
| 17 | | Hriday Narayan Dikshit | Bhagwantnagar | 30 March 2017 | 29 March 2022 | 4 years, 364 days | 17th | Bharatiya Janata Party |
| 18 | | Satish Mahana | Maharajpur | 29 March 2022 | Incumbent | 4 years, 162 days | 18th | Bharatiya Janata Party |

== List of the Speakers of Uttarakhand ==
| No. | Name | Portrait | Constituency | Term | | Party | Assembly (Election) |
|---|---|---|---|---|---|---|---|
| 1 | Prakash Pant | | MLC for Kumaon Local Authorities | 12 March 2001 | 14 March 2002 | Bharatiya Janata Party | Interim Uttaranchal Assembly |
| 2 | Yashpal Arya | | Mukteshwar | 15 March 2002 | 11 March 2007 | Indian National Congress | 1st Assembly (2002) |
| 3 | Harbans Kapoor | | Dehradun | 12 March 2007 | 13 March 2012 | Bharatiya Janata Party | 2nd Assembly (2007) |
| 4 | Govind Singh Kunjwal | | Jageshwar | 26 March 2012 | 20 March 2017 | Indian National Congress | 3rd Assembly (2012) |
| 5 | Premchand Aggarwal | | Rishikesh | 23 March 2017 | 21 March 2022 | Bharatiya Janata Party | 4th Assembly (2017) |
| 6 | Ritu Khanduri Bhushan | | Kotdwar | 26 March 2022 | Incumbent | Bharatiya Janata Party | 5th Assembly (2022) |

== Deputy Speaker ==
The Deputy Speaker of the Uttarakhand Legislative Assembly is the vice-presiding officer of the legislative assembly. Acts as the presiding officer in case of leave or absence caused by death or illness of the Speaker.

== List of the Deputy Speakers of Uttarakhand ==
| No. | Name | Portrait | Constituency | Term | | Party | Assembly (Election) |
|---|---|---|---|---|---|---|---|
| – | Vacant | | | 9 November 2000 | 14 March 2002 | N/A | Interim Uttaranchal Assembly |
| – | Vacant | | | 15 March 2002 | 11 March 2007 | N/A | 1st Assembly (2002) |
| – | Vacant | | | 12 March 2007 | 20 December 2008 | N/A | 2nd Assembly (2007) |
| 1 | Vijaya Barthwal | | Yamkeshwar | 20 December 2008 | 27 June 2009 | Bharatiya Janata Party | 2nd Assembly (2007) |
| – | Vacant | | | 27 June 2009 | 4 December 2012 | N/A | 2nd Assembly (2007) |
| 2 | Anusuya Prasad Maikhuri | | Karnaprayag | 4 December 2012 | 20 March 2017 | Indian National Congress | 3rd Assembly (2012) |
| 3 | Raghunath Singh Chauhan | | Almora | 28 March 2017 | 10 March 2022 | Bharatiya Janata Party | 4th Assembly (2017) |
| – | Vacant | | | Since 26 March 2022 | | N/A | 5th Assembly (2022) |

== Pro tem Speaker ==
After a general election and the formation of a new government, a list of senior members of the legislative assembly prepared by the legislative section is submitted to the Minister of Parliamentary Affairs of Uttarakhand, who selects a Pro tem speaker who hold the office of speaker until a full-time speaker is elected. The appointment has to be approved by the Governor.

The first meeting after the election when the speaker and the deputy speaker are elected by members of the legislative assembly, is held under the pro-tem speaker. In absence of the speaker, the deputy speaker acts as speaker and in the absence of both a committee of six members selected by the speaker will act as speaker according to their seniority.

== List of the Pro tem Speakers of Uttarakhand ==
| No. | Name | Portrait | Constituency | Term | Party | Assembly (Election) |
|---|---|---|---|---|---|---|
| 1 | Muhammad Muhiuddin | | Laksar | 2000 | Bahujan Samaj Party | Interim Uttaranchal Assembly |
| 2 | Harbans Kapoor | | Dehradun | 2002 | Bharatiya Janata Party | 1st Assembly (2002) |
| 2 | Harbans Kapoor | | Dehradun | 2007 | Bharatiya Janata Party | 2nd Assembly (2007) |
| 3 | Shailendra Mohan Singhal | | Jaspur | 2012 | Indian National Congress | 3rd Assembly (2012) |
| (2) | Harbans Kapoor | | Dehradun Cantonment | 2017 | Bharatiya Janata Party | 4th Assembly (2017) |
| 4 | Banshidhar Bhagat | | Kaladhungi | 2022 | Bharatiya Janata Party | 5th Assembly (2022) |

== See also ==
- Government of Uttarakhand
- Governor of Uttarakhand
- Chief Minister of Uttarakhand
- Uttarakhand Legislative Assembly
- Leader of the Opposition in the Uttarakhand Legislative Assembly
- Cabinet of Uttarakhand
- Chief Justice of Uttarakhand
- Speaker of the Lok Sabha
- Chairperson of the Rajya Sabha
- List of current Indian legislative speakers and chairpersons
