= 1st Uttar Pradesh Assembly =

First legislature of Uttar Pradesh, 1952–1957

First Legislative Assembly of Uttar Pradesh (First Vidhan Sabha of Uttar Pradesh)
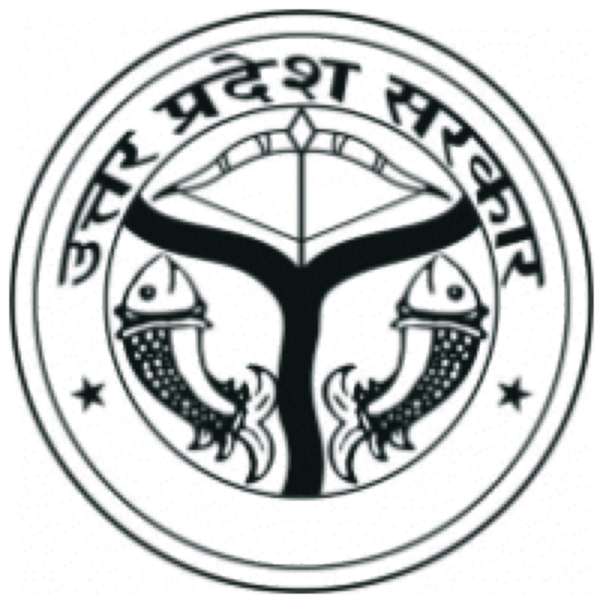

Type
- Type: Bicameral
- Term limits: May 1952 - Mar 1957

Leadership
- Chief Minister: Govind Ballabh Pant, INC
- Speaker of the Assembly: Atmaram Govind Kher, INC since May 1952
- Leader of the Opposition: Lokbandhu Raj Narain, SP

Structure
- Seats: 431
- Political groups: INC (388); SP (20); IND (15)

Elections
- Voting system: FPTP

Meeting place
- U.P. Secretariat, Lucknow, India

Website
- U.P. Legislative Assembly website

The First Legislative Assembly of Uttar Pradesh (a.k.a. First Vidhan Sabha of Uttar Pradesh) was constituted in May 1952 as a result of Indian general election, 1951–52. First Legislative Assembly had total of 431 MLAs (later revised to 426 including one nominated Anglo-Indian member).

== Electors ==
| | Male | Female | Others | Total |
|---|---|---|---|---|
| Electors | - | - | - | 31,700,151 |
| Electors who voted | - | - | - | 16,758,619 |
| Polling percentage | - | - | - | 52.87% |

== Candidates ==
| | Male | Female | Others | Total |
|---|---|---|---|---|
| Candidates | - | - | - | 2,604 |
| Elected | - | - | - | 430 |
| Forfeited deposits | - | - | - | 1,763 |

== Important members ==
| # | From | To | Position | Name | Party |
|---|---|---|---|---|---|
| 01 | 1952 | 1957 | Chief Minister | Govind Ballabh Pant | INC |
| 02 | 1952 | 1957 | Speaker | Atmaram Govind Kher | INC |
| 03 | 1952 | 1957 | Deputy Speaker | Hargovind Pant | INC |
| 04 | 1952 | 1957 | Leader of the House | Govind Ballabh Pant | INC |
| 05 | 1952 | 1955 | Leader of the Opposition | Lokbandhu Raj Narain | SP |
| 06 | 1955 | 1957 | Leader of the Opposition | Genda Singh | PSP |

== List of members ==
| District | # | Constituency Name | Name | Party | Comments |
|---|---|---|---|---|---|
| Dehradun | 1 | Chakrata-Western Doon North | Shanti Prapann Sharma | Indian National Congress | |
| Dehradun | 2 | Western Doon South-Eastern Doon | Nardev Shastri | Indian National Congress | |
| Tehri Garhwal | 3 | Rawain-Tehri North | Jayendra Singh Bisht | Independent politician | |
| Tehri Garhwal | 4 | Devprayag | Satya Singh Rana | Independent politician | |
| Tehri Garhwal | 5 | Tehri South-Pratapnagar | Balendushah Maharajkumar | Independent politician | |
| Garhwal | 6 | Chamoli West-Pauri North | Gangadhar Maithani | Praja Socialist Party | |
| Garhwal | 7 | Pauri South-Chamoli East | Chandra Singh Rawat | Indian National Congress | |
| Garhwal | 7 | Pauri South-Chamoli East | Baldev Singh Arya | Indian National Congress | |
| Garhwal | 8 | Lansdowne East | Ram Prasad Nautiyal | Indian National Congress | |
| Garhwal | 9 | Lansdowne West | Jagmohan Singh Negi | Indian National Congress | |
| Almora | 10 | Pithoragarh Champawat | Khushi Ram | Indian National Congress | |
| Almora | 10 | Pithoragarh Champawat | Narendra Singh Bisht | Indian National Congress | |
| Almora | 11 | Ranikhet North | Madan Mohan Upadhyay | Praja Socialist Party | |
| Almora | 12 | Ranikhet South | Hargovind Pant | Indian National Congress | |
| Almora | 13 | Almora North | Bhupal Singh Khati | Indian National Congress | |
| Almora | 14 | Almora South | Govardhan Tiwari | Indian National Congress | |
| Nainital | 15 | Nainital North | Narayan Dutt Tiwari | Praja Socialist Party | |
| Nainital | 16 | Nainital South | Laxman Dutt Bhat | Indian National Congress | |
| Bareilly | 17 | Baheri North East | Ram Murti | Indian National Congress | |
| Bareilly | 18 | Baheri South-West-Bareilly West | Dharmdutt Vaidhya | Indian National Congress | |
| Bareilly | 19 | Bareilly Municipality | Govind Ballabh Pant | Indian National Congress | Resigned 1952 |
| Bareilly | 19 | Bareilly Municipality | Jagdish Sharan Agrawal | Indian National Congress | Elected in 1952 bypoll |
| Bareilly | 20 | Bareilly East | Safia Abdul Wajid | Indian National Congress | |
| Bareilly | 21 | Bareilly West | Ram Charan Gangawar | Indian National Congress | |
| Bareilly | 22 | Aonla West | Nawal Kishor | Indian National Congress | |
| Bareilly | 23 | Aonla East-Faridpur | Natthu Singh | Indian National Congress | |
| Bareilly | 23 | Aonla East-Faridpur | Sundar Lal | Indian National Congress | |
| Bareilly | 24 | Nawabganj | Nauarang Lal Vakil | Indian National Congress | |
| Pilibhit | 25 | Pilibhit West | Maqsood Alam Khan | Indian National Congress | |
| Pilibhit | 26 | Pilibhit East-Bisalpur West | Niranjan Singh | Indian National Congress | |
| Pilibhit | 27 | Puranpur-Bisalpur East | Munindra Pal Singh | Praja Socialist Party | |
| Pilibhit | 28 | Bisalpur Central | Hari Prasad | Praja Socialist Party | |
| Moradabad | 29 | Thakurdwara | Shivswaroop Singh Chaudhary | Indian National Congress | |
| Moradabad | 30 | Amroha East | Khyali Ram | Indian National Congress | |
| Moradabad | 31 | Amroha West | Mohammad Taqi Hadi | Indian National Congress | |
| Moradabad | 32 | Hasanpur North | Latafat Hussain | Indian National Congress | |
| Moradabad | 33 | Hasanpur South-Sambhal West | Jagdish Prasad | Indian National Congress | |
| Moradabad | 34 | Sambhal East | Lekhraj Singh | Indian National Congress | |
| Moradabad | 34 | Sambhal East | Jagdish Sharan Rastogi | Indian National Congress | |
| Moradabad | 35 | Moradabad South | Kedar Nath | Indian National Congress | |
| Moradabad | 36 | Moradabad North | Dau Dayal Khanna | Indian National Congress | |
| Moradabad | 37 | Bilari | Harsahay Gupta | Indian National Congress | |
| Moradabad | 37 | Bilari | Mahi Lal | Indian National Congress | |
| Rampur | 38 | Rampur | Fazalul Haq | Indian National Congress | |
| Rampur | 39 | Huzur-Milak North | Kalyan Rai | Indian National Congress | |
| Rampur | 40 | Milak South-Shahbad | Krishna Sharan Arya | Indian National Congress | |
| Rampur | 41 | Suar-Tanda-Bilaspur | Mahmood Ali Khan | Indian National Congress | |
| Bijnor | 42 | Najibabad North-Nagina North | Ratanalal Jain | Indian National Congress | |
| Bijnor | 43 | Bijnor North-Najiwabad West | Mohammed Abdul Latif | Indian National Congress | |
| Bijnor | 44 | Bijnor Central | Chandrawati | Indian National Congress | |
| Bijnor | 45 | Bijnor South-Dhampur South West | Shiv Kumar Sharma | Indian National Congress | |
| Bijnor | 46 | Dhampur North East-Nagina East | Khoob Singh | Indian National Congress | |
| Bijnor | 46 | Dhampur North East-Nagina East | Girdhari Lal | Indian National Congress | |
| Bijnor | 47 | Nagina South West-Dhampur North West | Hafiz Muhammad Ibrahim | Indian National Congress | |
| Saharanpur | 48 | Roorkee East | Deen Dayal Shastri | Indian National Congress | |
| Saharanpur | 49 | Roorkee South | Khwaja Atahar Hasan | Indian National Congress | |
| Saharanpur | 50 | Roorkee West-Saharanpur North | Jaipal Singh | Indian National Congress | |
| Saharanpur | 50 | Roorkee West-Saharanpur North | Shugan Chandra | Indian National Congress | |
| Saharanpur | 51 | Saharanpur City | Muhammad Manzoorul Navi | Indian National Congress | |
| Saharanpur | 52 | Deoband | Hardev | Indian National Congress | |
| Saharanpur | 52 | Deoband | Phool Singh | Indian National Congress | |
| Saharanpur | 53 | Saharanpur North West-Nakur North | Mahmood Ali Khan | Indian National Congress | |
| Saharanpur | 54 | Nakur South | Data Ram | Indian National Congress | |
| Muzaffarnagar | 55 | Muzaffarnagar East-Jansath North | Balwant Singh | Indian National Congress | |
| Muzaffarnagar | 56 | Muzaffarnagar West | Rajendra Dutta | Indian National Congress | |
| Muzaffarnagar | 57 | Kairana North | Keshav Gupta | Indian National Congress | |
| Muzaffarnagar | 58 | Muzaffarnagar Central | Dwarika Prasad Mittal | Indian National Congress | |
| Muzaffarnagar | 59 | Kairana South | Virendra Verma | Indian National Congress | |
| Muzaffarnagar | 60 | Budhana West | Srichandra | Indian National Congress | |
| Muzaffarnagar | 61 | Budhana East-Jansath South | Ramdas Arya | Indian National Congress | |
| Muzaffarnagar | 61 | Budhana East-Jansath South | Mohammed Navi | Indian National Congress | |
| Meerut | 62 | Baghpat West | Charan Singh | Indian National Congress | |
| Meerut | 63 | Baraut | Umrao Dutt Sharma (Also known as Umrao Dutt Ved) | Independent politician | |
| Meerut | 64 | Baghpat East | Acharya Dipanker | Independent politician | |
| Meerut | 65 | Sardhana East | Bishamber Singh | Indian National Congress | |
| Meerut | 66 | Sardhana West | Fateh Singh Rana | Indian National Congress | |
| Meerut | 67 | Ghaziabad North East | Vichitra Narayan Sharma | Indian National Congress | |
| Meerut | 68 | Ghaziabad North West | Teja Singh | Indian National Congress | |
| Meerut | 69 | Ghaziabad South | Balveer Singh | Indian National Congress | |
| Meerut | 70 | Hapur South | Vir Sen | Indian National Congress | |
| Meerut | 70 | Hapur South | Lutf Ali Khan | Indian National Congress | |
| Meerut | 71 | Meerut Municipality | Kailash Prakash | Indian National Congress | |
| Meerut | 72 | Hapur North | Hari Singh | Indian National Congress | |
| Meerut | 72 | Hapur North | Prakashwati Sood | Indian National Congress | |
| Meerut | 73 | Mawana | Vishnu Sharan Dublish | Indian National Congress | |
| Meerut | 73 | Mawana | Ramji Lal Sahayak | Indian National Congress | |
| Bulandshahr | 74 | Sikanderabad West | Ram Chandra Vikal | Indian National Congress | |
| Bulandshahr | 75 | Sikandarabad East | Kewal Singh | Indian National Congress | |
| Bulandshahr | 76 | Khurja | Bhimsen | Indian National Congress | |
| Bulandshahr | 76 | Khurja | Kishan Swaroop Bhatnagar | Indian National Congress | |
| Bulandshahr | 77 | Bulandshahr North West | Irtiza Husain | Indian National Congress | |
| Bulandshahr | 78 | Bulandshahr Central | Banarasi Das | Indian National Congress | |
| Bulandshahr | 79 | Bulandshahr North East | Mohan Singh | Indian National Congress | |
| Bulandshahr | 80 | Anupshahr North | Deen Dayal Sharma | Indian National Congress | |
| Bulandshahr | 81 | Bulandshahr South-Anupshahr South | Dharam Singh | Indian National Congress | |
| Bulandshahr | 81 | Bulandshahr South-Anupshahr South | Dev Dutt Sharma | Indian National Congress | |
| Aligarh | 82 | Hathras | Nand Kumar Dev Vashishth | Indian National Congress | |
| Aligarh | 82 | Hathras | Harakhpal Singh Piple | Indian National Congress | |
| Aligarh | 83 | Iglas | Shivdaan Singh | Indian National Congress | |
| Aligarh | 84 | Khair-Koil North West | Ram Prasad Deshmukh | Indian National Congress | |
| Aligarh | 84 | Khair-Koil North West | Mohan Lal Gautam | Indian National Congress | |
| Aligarh | 85 | Koil Central | Nafisul Hassan | Indian National Congress | Resigned 27 May 1952 |
| Aligarh | 85 | Koil Central | Malkhan Singh | Indian National Congress | Elected in 1952 bypoll |
| Aligarh | 86 | Atrauli North | Srinivas | Indian National Congress | |
| Aligarh | 87 | Atrauli South-Koil East | Raja Ram | Indian National Congress | |
| Aligarh | 88 | Sikandra Rao North-Koil South East | Netra Pal Singh | Indian National Congress | |
| Aligarh | 89 | Sikandra Rao South | Nekram Sharma | Indian National Congress | |
| Agra | 90 | Kiraoli | Ramesh Verma | Indian National Congress | |
| Agra | 91 | Kheragarh | Jagan Prasad Rawat | Indian National Congress | |
| Agra | 92 | Agra City North | Babu Lal Mittal | Indian National Congress | |
| Agra | 93 | Agra City West | C. V. Mahajan | Indian National Congress | |
| Agra | 93 | Agra City West | Krishna Dutt Paliwal | Independent politician | Elected in 1956 bypoll |
| Agra | 94 | Agra | Devaki Nandan Vibhav | Indian National Congress | |
| Agra | 95 | Etmadpur-Agra East | Ulfat Singh Chauhan 'Nirbhay' | Indian National Congress | |
| Agra | 95 | Etmadpur-Agra East | Puttulal | Indian National Congress | |
| Agra | 96 | Firozabad-Fatehabad | Gangadhar Jatav | Indian National Congress | |
| Agra | 96 | Firozabad-Fatehabad | Israrul Haq | Indian National Congress | |
| Agra | 97 | Bah | Shambhunath Chaturvedi | Indian National Congress | |
| Mathura | 98 | Mat-Sadabad West | Lakshmi Raman Acharya | Indian National Congress | |
| Mathura | 98 | Mat-Sadabad West | Daal Chandra | Indian National Congress | |
| Mathura | 99 | Chhata | Ramhet Singh | Indian National Congress | |
| Mathura | 100 | Mathura South | Jugal Kishor | Indian National Congress | |
| Mathura | 101 | Mathura North | Srinnath Bhargava | Indian National Congress | |
| Mathura | 102 | Sadabad East | Ashraf Ali Khan | Indian National Congress | |
| Etah | 103 | Jalesar-Etah North | Fateh Singh | Indian National Congress | Died in 1952 |
| Etah | 103 | Jalesar-Etah North | Sahadev Singh | Indian National Congress | Elected in 1952 bypoll |
| Etah | 103 | Jalesar-Etah North | Chiranji Lal Jatav | Indian National Congress | |
| Etah | 104 | Etah South | Hoti Lal Das | Indian National Congress | |
| Etah | 105 | Etah East-Aliganj West-Kasganj South | Vidyawati Rathore | Indian National Congress | |
| Etah | 106 | Kasganj West | Babu Ram Gupta | Indian National Congress | |
| Etah | 107 | Kasganj North | Tirmal Singh | Indian National Congress | |
| Etah | 108 | Kasganj East-Aliganj North | Smt. Saeed Jahan Makhfi Sherwani | Indian National Congress | |
| Etah | 109 | Aliganj South | Mohan Singh Shakya | Independent politician | |
| Badaun | 110 | Badaun South West | Tulsi Ram | Indian National Congress | |
| Badaun | 110 | Badaun South West | R. Singh | Praja Socialist Party | Elected in 1952 bypoll |
| Badaun | 111 | Gunnaur North | Karan Singh Yadav | Indian National Congress | |
| Badaun | 112 | Bisauli-Gunnaur East | Chunni Lal Sagar | Indian National Congress | |
| Badaun | 112 | Bisauli-Gunnaur East | Shivraj Singh Yadav | Indian National Congress | |
| Badaun | 113 | Badaun North | Nihaluddin | Praja Socialist Party | |
| Badaun | 113 | Badaun North | S. N. Pandit | Indian National Congress | Elected in 1952 bypoll |
| Badaun | 113 | Badaun North | Tika Ram | Independent politician | Elected in 1956 bypoll |
| Badaun | 114 | Dataganj South-Badaun South East | Narottam Singh | Independent politician | |
| Badaun | 115 | Dataganj North | Onkar Singh | Bharatiya Jan Sangh | |
| Badaun | 116 | Sahaswan West | Mushtaq Ali Khan | Indian National Congress | |
| Badaun | 117 | Sahaswan East | Keshon Ram | Indian National Congress | |
| Mainpuri | 118 | Mainpur North-Bhongaon North | Ganesh Chandra Kachhi | Indian National Congress | |
| Mainpuri | 119 | Karhal East-Bhongaon South | Mizaji Lal | Indian National Congress | |
| Mainpuri | 119 | Karhal East-Bhongaon South | Shiv Baksh Singh Rathore | Indian National Congress | |
| Mainpuri | 120 | Mainpuri South | Virendra Pati Yadav | Indian National Congress | |
| Mainpuri | 121 | Jasrana | Vishnu Dayal Verma | Independent politician | |
| Mainpuri | 122 | Shikohabad West | Maharaj Singh | Indian National Congress | |
| Mainpuri | 123 | Karhal West-Shikohabad East | Banshi Das Dhangar | Praja Socialist Party | |
| Farrukhabad | 124 | Kannauj North | Kalicharan Tandon | Indian National Congress | |
| Farrukhabad | 125 | Chibramau East-Farrukhabad East | Awadhesh Chandra Singh | Indian National Congress | |
| Farrukhabad | 125 | Chibramau East-Farrukhabad East | Pati Ram | Indian National Congress | |
| Farrukhabad | 126 | Farrukhabad Central-Kaimganj East | Siyaram Gangawar | Indian National Congress | |
| Farrukhabad | 127 | Kaimganj West | Sultan Alam Khan | Indian National Congress | |
| Farrukhabad | 128 | Farrukhabad West-Chibramau | Mathura Prasad Tripathi | Indian National Congress | |
| Farrukhabad | 129 | Chibramau South-Kannauj South | Chiranjilal Paliwal | Indian National Congress | |
| Kanpur | 130 | Kanpur City North | Surya Prasad Awasthi | Indian National Congress | |
| Kanpur | 131 | Kanpur City South | Brahma Dutt Dixit | Indian National Congress | |
| Kanpur | 132 | Kanpur City East | Dr. Jawahar Lal Rohatagi | Indian National Congress | |
| Kanpur | 133 | Kanpur City Central West | Vasudev Prasad Mishra | Indian National Congress | |
| Kanpur | 134 | Kanpur City Central East | Hameed Khan | Indian National Congress | |
| Kanpur | 135 | Akbarpur South | Ramdulare Mishra | Indian National Congress | |
| Kanpur | 136 | Bilhaur-Akbarpur | Brij Rani Devi Mishra | Indian National Congress | |
| Kanpur | 136 | Bilhaur-Akbarpur | Murlidhar Kuril | Indian National Congress | |
| Kanpur | 137 | Ghatampur-Bhognipur East | Brij Bihari Mehrotra | Indian National Congress | |
| Kanpur | 137 | Ghatampur-Bhognipur East | Dayal Das Bhagat | Indian National Congress | |
| Kanpur | 138 | Bhognipur West-Derapur South | Ram Swaroop Gupta | Indian National Congress | |
| Kanpur | 139 | Kanpur Tehsil | Beni Singh Awasthi | Indian National Congress | |
| Kanpur | 140 | Derapur North | Shivram Pandey | Indian National Congress | |
| Etawah | 141 | Auraiya-Bharthana South | Satya Narayan Dutt | Indian National Congress | |
| Etawah | 141 | Auraiya-Bharthana South | Tula Ram | Indian National Congress | |
| Etawah | 142 | Bidhuna East | Gajendra Singh | Praja Socialist Party | |
| Etawah | 143 | Bidhuna West-Bharthaan North-Etawah North | Miharban Singh | Indian National Congress | |
| Etawah | 143 | Bidhuna West-Bharthaan North-Etawah North | Ghasiram Jatav | Indian National Congress | |
| Etawah | 144 | Etawah South | Gopinath Dixit | Indian National Congress | |
| Jhansi | 145 | Garotha-Moth North | Ram Sahay Sharma | Indian National Congress | |
| Jhansi | 146 | Man-Moth South-Jhansi West-Lalitpur North | Gajjoo Ram | Indian National Congress | |
| Jhansi | 146 | Man-Moth South-Jhansi West-Lalitpur North | Laxman Rao Kadam | Indian National Congress | |
| Jhansi | 147 | Jhansi East | Atma Ram Govind Kher | Indian National Congress | |
| Jhansi | 148 | Lalitpur South | Krishna Chandra Sharma | Indian National Congress | |
| Jhansi | 149 | Mahroni | Ramnath Khaira | Indian National Congress | |
| Jalaun | 150 | Kalpi-Jalaun North | King Virendra Shah | Uttar Pradesh Praja Party | |
| Jalaun | 150 | Kalpi-Jalaun North | Basant Lal | Indian National Congress | |
| Jalaun | 151 | Konch | Chittar Singh Niranjan | Indian National Congress | |
| Jalaun | 152 | Orai-Jalaun South | Chaturbhuj Sharma | Indian National Congress | |
| Hamirpur | 153 | Mahoba-Kulpahar-Charkhari | Joravar Verma | Independent politician | |
| Hamirpur | 153 | Mahoba-Kulpahar-Charkhari | Munni Lal Gurudev | Indian National Congress | |
| Hamirpur | 154 | Hamirpur-Maudaha North | Surendar Dutt Bajpai | Indian National Congress | |
| Hamirpur | 155 | Maudaha South | Tej Pratap Singh | Independent politician | |
| Hamirpur | 156 | Rath | Shripat Sahai | Indian National Congress | |
| Banda | 157 | Mau-Karvi-Baberu East | Jagpat Singh | Indian National Congress | |
| Banda | 157 | Mau-Karvi-Baberu East | Darshan Ram | Indian National Congress | |
| Banda | 158 | Baberu West | Ram Sanehi Bhartiya | Indian National Congress | |
| Banda | 159 | Naraini | Shyama Charan Bajpai Shastri | Indian National Congress | |
| Banda | 160 | Banda | Pahalwan Singh | Indian National Congress | |
| Fatehpur | 161 | Khajuha West | Guru Prasad Pandey | Indian National Congress | |
| Fatehpur | 162 | Khajuha East-Fatehpur South West | Shivraj Wali Singh | Indian National Congress | |
| Fatehpur | 163 | Fatehpur East-Khanga North | Abdul Rauf Khan | Indian National Congress | |
| Fatehpur | 164 | Fatehpur South-Khanga South | Anant Swaroop Singh | Indian National Congress | |
| Fatehpur | 164 | Fatehpur South-Khanga South | Bhagwan Deen Balmiki | Indian National Congress | |
| Unnao | 165 | Unnao South | Leeladhar Asthana | Indian National Congress | |
| Unnao | 166 | Safipur-Unnao North | Habiburrehman Ansari | Indian National Congress | |
| Unnao | 166 | Safipur-Unnao North | Mohan Lal | Indian National Congress | |
| Unnao | 167 | Purwa Central | Ram Adheen Singh Yadav | Indian National Congress | |
| Unnao | 168 | Purwa South | Dev Dutt Mishra | Indian National Congress | |
| Unnao | 169 | Purwa North-Hasanganj | Seva Ram | Indian National Congress | |
| Unnao | 169 | Purwa North-Hasanganj | Jatashankar Shukla | Indian National Congress | |
| Raebareli | 170 | Dalmau South West | Guptar Singh | Indian National Congress | |
| Raebareli | 171 | Dalmau East | Uday Bhan Singh | Indian National Congress | Elected in 1952 bypoll |
| Raebareli | 171 | Dalmau East | Chanderpal Bajpai | Indian National Congress | |
| Raebareli | 172 | Raebareli-Dalmau North | Ram Prasad | Indian National Congress | |
| Raebareli | 172 | Raebareli-Dalmau North | Ram Shankar Dwivedi | Indian National Congress | |
| Raebareli | 173 | Maharajganj West | Rameshwar Prasad | Indian National Congress | |
| Raebareli | 173 | Maharajganj West | Ram Swaroop Mishra "Visharad" | Indian National Congress | |
| Raebareli | 174 | Maharajganj East-Salon North | Vasi Naqvi | Indian National Congress | |
| Raebareli | 175 | Salon South | Dal Bahadur Singh | Indian National Congress | |
| Hardoi | 176 | Shahabad West | Aizaz Rasool | Indian National Congress | |
| Hardoi | 177 | Shahabad East-Hardoi North West | Kanhaiya Lal Valmiki | Indian National Congress | |
| Hardoi | 177 | Shahabad East-Hardoi North West | Chheda Lal | Indian National Congress | |
| Hardoi | 178 | Hardoi East | Chandra Has | Indian National Congress | |
| Hardoi | 178 | Hardoi East | Kinder Lal | Indian National Congress | |
| Hardoi | 179 | Bilgram West | Virendra Nath Mishra | Indian National Congress | |
| Hardoi | 179 | Bilgram West | Sharada Bhakta Singh | Bharatiya Jan Sangh | Elected in 1956 bypoll |
| Hardoi | 180 | Bilgram East | Radhakrishna Agarwal | Indian National Congress | |
| Hardoi | 180 | Bilgram East | Mohan Lal Verma | Indian National Congress | Elected in 1956 bypoll as Praja Socialist Party candidate. Subsequently joined Congress. |
| Hardoi | 181 | Sandila-Bilgram South East | Laxmi Devi | Indian National Congress | |
| Hardoi | 181 | Sandila-Bilgram South East | Tika Ram | Indian National Congress | |
| Shahjahanpur | 182 | Shahjahanpur West-Jalalabad East | Pratipal Singh | Indian National Congress | |
| Shahjahanpur | 183 | Jalalabad West | Ram Gulam Singh | Indian National Congress | |
| Shahjahanpur | 184 | Shahjahanpur Central | Habibur Rahman Khan Hakim | Indian National Congress | |
| Shahjahanpur | 185 | Powayan-Shahjahanpur East | Prem Kishan Khanna | Indian National Congress | |
| Shahjahanpur | 185 | Powayan-Shahjahanpur East | Narayan Deen Balmiki | Indian National Congress | |
| Shahjahanpur | 186 | Tilhar North | Shiv Kumar Mishra | Indian National Congress | |
| Shahjahanpur | 187 | Tilhar South | Bhagwan Sahai | Independent politician | |
| Kheri | 188 | Nighsan-Lakhimpur North | Karan Singh | Indian National Congress | |
| Kheri | 188 | Nighsan-Lakhimpur North | Jagannath Prasad | Praja Socialist Party | |
| Kheri | 189 | Lakhimpur South | Banshi Dhar Mishra | Indian National Congress | |
| Kheri | 189 | Lakhimpur South | Chedalal Chowdhury | Indian National Congress | |
| Kheri | 190 | Mohammadi West | Rambhajan | Indian National Congress | |
| Kheri | 191 | Mohammadi East | Kamal Ahmed | Indian National Congress | |
| Sitapur | 192 | Sitapur East | Hakim Ahmed Baseer | Indian National Congress | |
| Sitapur | 193 | Sitapur North West | Harish Chandra Asthana | Indian National Congress | |
| Sitapur | 194 | Sitapur South East | Krishna Chandra Gupta | Indian National Congress | |
| Sitapur | 195 | Misrikh | Gangadhar Sharma | Indian National Congress | |
| Sitapur | 195 | Misrikh | Dalla Ram Chaudhary | Indian National Congress | |
| Sitapur | 196 | Sidhauli West | Tarachandra Maheshwari | Indian National Congress | |
| Sitapur | 196 | Sidhauli West | Kanhaiya Lal | Praja Socialist Party | Elected in 1952 bypoll |
| Sitapur | 196 | Sidhauli West | Tarachandra Maheshwari | Indian National Congress | Re-elected in 1952 bypoll |
| Sitapur | 196 | Sidhauli West | Baiju Ram | Indian National Congress | |
| Sitapur | 196 | Sidhauli West | Baiju Ram | Praja Socialist Party | Re-elected in 1952 bypoll as Praja Socialist Party candidate |
| Sitapur | 197 | Biswan-Sidhauli East | Suresh Prakash Singh | Independent politician | |
| Sitapur | 197 | Biswan-Sidhauli East | Munnoo Lal | Indian National Congress | |
| Lucknow | 198 | Mohanlalganj | Mahavir Prasad Srivastava | Indian National Congress | |
| Lucknow | 199 | Lucknow Central | Ramshankar Raviwasi | Indian National Congress | |
| Lucknow | 199 | Lucknow Central | Harish Chandra Bajpai | Indian National Congress | |
| Lucknow | 200 | Lucknow City West | Pulin Bihari Banerjee | Indian National Congress | |
| Lucknow | 201 | Lucknow City East | Chandra Bhanu Gupta | Indian National Congress | |
| Lucknow | 202 | Lucknow City Central | Syed Ali Zaheer | Indian National Congress | |
| Lucknow | 203 | Malihabad-Barabanki North West | Shyam Manohar Mishra | Indian National Congress | |
| Lucknow | 203 | Malihabad-Barabanki North West | Tula Ram Rawat | Indian National Congress | |
| Barabanki | 204 | Fatehpur North | Awadh Sharan Verma | Praja Socialist Party | |
| Barabanki | 204 | Fatehpur North | Ram Asrey Verma | Praja Socialist Party | Elected in 1956 bypoll |
| Barabanki | 205 | Nawabganj North | Jagat Narayan | Indian National Congress | |
| Barabanki | 206 | Fatehpur South | Bhagwati Prasad Shukla | Indian National Congress | |
| Barabanki | 206 | Fatehpur South | Ram Sevak Yadav | Bharatiya Kranti Dal | Elected in 1956 bypoll as an independent candidate |
| Barabanki | 207 | Nawabganj South-Haidergarh-Ramsanehighat | Ghanshyam Das | Indian National Congress | |
| Barabanki | 207 | Nawabganj South-Haidergarh-Ramsanehighat | Uma Shankar Mishra | Indian National Congress | |
| Barabanki | 208 | Ramsanehi Ghat | Babu Lal Kushumesh | Indian National Congress | |
| Barabanki | 208 | Ramsanehi Ghat | Jagannath Bux Das | Indian National Congress | |
| Pratapgarh | 209 | Pratapgarh East | Bhagwati Prasad Shukla | Indian National Congress | |
| Pratapgarh | 210 | Pratapgarh North West-Patti North West | Ram Kinkar | Indian National Congress | |
| Pratapgarh | 210 | Pratapgarh North West-Patti North West | Ram Adhar Tiwari | Indian National Congress | |
| Pratapgarh | 211 | Patti South | Girija Raman Shukla | Indian National Congress | |
| Pratapgarh | 212 | Patti East | Ram Raj Shukla | Indian National Congress | |
| Pratapgarh | 213 | Kunda South | Ram Swaroop Bharatiya | Indian National Congress | |
| Pratapgarh | 213 | Kunda South | Ram Naresh Shukla | Indian National Congress | |
| Pratapgarh | 214 | Pratapgarh West-Kunda North | Raja Ram Kisaan | Indian National Congress | |
| Sultanpur | 215 | Sultanpur West | Kunwar Krishna Verma | Indian National Congress | |
| Sultanpur | 216 | Sultanpur East-Amethi East | Rambali Mishra | Indian National Congress | |
| Sultanpur | 217 | Amethi Central | Rananjay Singh | Independent politician | |
| Sultanpur | 218 | Musafirkhana South-Amethi West | Guru Prasad Singh | Indian National Congress | |
| Sultanpur | 219 | Musafirkhana Central | Smt. Savitri Devi | Indian National Congress | |
| Sultanpur | 220 | Kadipur | Shankar Lal | Indian National Congress | |
| Sultanpur | 220 | Kadipur | Kashi Prasad Pandey | Indian National Congress | |
| Sultanpur | 221 | Musafirkhana North-Sultanpur North | Guljar | Indian National Congress | |
| Sultanpur | 221 | Musafirkhana North-Sultanpur North | Nazim Ali | Indian National Congress | |
| Faizabad | 222 | Akbarpur East | Ram Narayan Tripathi | Praja Socialist Party | |
| Faizabad | 223 | Akbarpur West | Jairam Verma | Indian National Congress | |
| Faizabad | 223 | Akbarpur West | Ramdas Ravidas | Indian National Congress | |
| Faizabad | 224 | Bikapur West | Ram Harsh Yadav | Indian National Congress | |
| Faizabad | 225 | Bikapur East | Awadhesh Pratap Singh | Independent politician | |
| Faizabad | 226 | Bikapur Central | Brijvasi Lal | Indian National Congress | |
| Faizabad | 227 | Tanda | Ram Sumer | Indian National Congress | |
| Faizabad | 227 | Tanda | Mohammad Naseer | Indian National Congress | |
| Faizabad | 228 | Faizabad West | Raja Ram Mishra | Indian National Congress | |
| Faizabad | 229 | Faizabad East | Madan Gopal Vaidya | Indian National Congress | |
| Faizabad | 229 | Faizabad East | Narayan Das | Indian National Congress | |
| Jaunpur | 230 | Kerakat-Jaunpur South | Parmeshwari Ram | Indian National Congress | |
| Jaunpur | 230 | Kerakat-Jaunpur South | Lal Bahadur Singh Kashyap | Indian National Congress | |
| Jaunpur | 231 | Jaunpur East | Hargovind Singh | Indian National Congress | |
| Jaunpur | 232 | Jaunpur West | Deep Narayan Verma | Indian National Congress | |
| Jaunpur | 233 | Machhlishahr North | Nageshwar Prasad | Indian National Congress | |
| Jaunpur | 234 | Machhlishahr South | Mohammad Rauf Jafri | Indian National Congress | |
| Jaunpur | 235 | Shahganj East | Babu Nandan | Indian National Congress | |
| Jaunpur | 235 | Shahganj East | Lakshmi Shankar Yadav | Indian National Congress | |
| Jaunpur | 236 | Mariahu South | Ramesh Chandra Sharma | Indian National Congress | |
| Jaunpur | 237 | Mariahu North | Dwarika Prasad Maurya | Indian National Congress | |
| Jaunpur | 238 | Jaunpur North-Shahganj West | Bhagwati Deen Tiwari | Indian National Congress | |
| Allahabad | 239 | Meja-Karchana South | Raghunath Prasad | Indian National Congress | |
| Allahabad | 239 | Meja-Karchana South | Mangala Prasad | Indian National Congress | |
| Allahabad | 240 | Karchana North-Chail South | Jawahar Lal | Indian National Congress | |
| Allahabad | 240 | Karchana North-Chail South | Hemwati Nandan Bahuguna | Indian National Congress | |
| Allahabad | 241 | Soraon North-Phulpur West | Lal Bahadur Shastri | Indian National Congress | |
| Allahabad | 241 | Soraon North-Phulpur West | Sangram Singh | Indian National Congress | Elected in 1952 bypoll |
| Allahabad | 242 | Soraon South | Parmanand Sinha | Indian National Congress | |
| Allahabad | 242 | Soraon South | Bhola Singh | Praja Socialist Party | |
| Allahabad | 243 | Phulpur Central | Shivnath Katju | Indian National Congress | |
| Allahabad | 244 | Phulpur East-Handia North West | Bhuver Ji | Indian National Congress | |
| Allahabad | 245 | Handia South | Mahavir Prasad Shukla | Indian National Congress | |
| Allahabad | 246 | Sirathu-Manjahnpur | Shiv Kumar Pandey | Indian National Congress | |
| Allahabad | 246 | Sirathu-Manjahnpur | Salig Ram Jaiswal | Praja Socialist Party | Elected in 1952 bypoll |
| Allahabad | 246 | Sirathu-Manjahnpur | Sukhiram Bhartiya | Indian National Congress | |
| Allahabad | 247 | Allahabad City East | Ganesh Prasad Jaiswal | Indian National Congress | |
| Allahabad | 248 | Allahabad City Central | Kalyan Chand Mohile Alias Chhunan Guru | Praja Socialist Party | Elected in 1952 bypoll |
| Allahabad | 248 | Allahabad City Central | Vishambhar Nath | Indian National Congress | |
| Allahabad | 249 | Chail North | Muzaffar Hasan | Indian National Congress | |
| Mirzapur | 250 | Dudhi-Robertsganj | Brij Bhushan Mishra | Indian National Congress | |
| Mirzapur | 250 | Dudhi-Robertsganj | Ram Swaroop | Indian National Congress | |
| Mirzapur | 251 | Mirzapur South | Aziz Imam | Indian National Congress | |
| Mirzapur | 251 | Mirzapur South | Ram Krishna Jaiswar | Indian National Congress | |
| Mirzapur | 252 | Mirzapur North | Amresh Chandra Pandey | Indian National Congress | |
| Mirzapur | 253 | Chunar North | Raj Kumar Sharma | Indian National Congress | |
| Mirzapur | 254 | Chunar South | Raj Narayan Singh | Indian National Congress | |
| Varanasi | 255 | Chakla-Chandauli South East | Kamlapati Tripathi | Indian National Congress | |
| Varanasi | 255 | Chakla-Chandauli South East | Ram Lakhan | Indian National Congress | |
| Varanasi | 256 | Chandauli North | Kamta Prasad Vidhyarthi | Indian National Congress | |
| Varanasi | 257 | Chandauli-Ramnagar South West | Uma Shankar Tiwari | Indian National Congress | |
| Varanasi | 258 | Banaras City North | Sheikh Muhammad Abdussamad | Indian National Congress | |
| Varanasi | 259 | Banaras City South | Dr. Sampurnanand | Indian National Congress | |
| Varanasi | 260 | Banaras North | Lal Bahadur Singh | Indian National Congress | |
| Varanasi | 261 | Banaras Central | Baldev Singh | Bharatiya Kranti Dal | |
| Varanasi | 262 | Banaras South | Raj Narain | Praja Socialist Party | |
| Varanasi | 263 | Banaras West | Dev Murti Sharma | Indian National Congress | |
| Varanasi | 264 | Gyanpur East | Bechan Ram Gupta | Indian National Congress | |
| Varanasi | 265 | Gyanpur North West | Vansh Narayan Singh | Indian National Congress | |
| Varanasi | 265 | Gyanpur North West | Bechan Ram | Indian National Congress | |
| Bahraich | 266 | Bahraich East | Raj Kishore Rao | Indian National Congress | |
| Bahraich | 266 | Bahraich East | Shiv Saran Lal Srivastava | Indian National Congress | |
| Bahraich | 267 | Bahraich West | Yamuna Prasad | Indian National Congress | |
| Bahraich | 267 | Bahraich West | Triloki Nath Kaul | Indian National Congress | |
| Bahraich | 268 | Nanpara East | Newazish Khan | Independent politician | |
| Bahraich | 268 | Nanpara East | Virendra Vikram Singh | Uttar Pradesh Praja Party | |
| Bahraich | 269 | Nanpara North | Basant Lal Sharma | Indian National Congress | |
| Bahraich | 270 | Nanpara South | Mohammed Saadat Ali Khan | Independent politician | |
| Bahraich | 271 | Kaiserganj North | Bhagwan Deen Mishra | Indian National Congress | |
| Bahraich | 271 | Kaiserganj North | R. P. N. Singh | Independent politician | Elected in 1952 bypoll |
| Bahraich | 271 | Kaiserganj North | Sunder Das Diwan | Indian National Congress | Elected in 1952 bypoll |
| Bahraich | 272 | Kaiserganj Central | Siyaram Chaudhary | Indian National Congress | |
| Bahraich | 273 | Kaiserganj South | Hukum Singh Bisen | Indian National Congress | Re-elected in 1952 bypoll |
| Bahraich | 273 | Kaiserganj South | Hukum Singh Bisen | Indian National Congress | |
| Gonda | 274 | Utraula South West | Raja Raghavendra Pratap Singh | Indian National Congress | |
| Gonda | 275 | Utraula Central | Muhammad Shahid Fakhari | Indian National Congress | |
| Gonda | 276 | Utraula North | Shyam Lal | Indian National Congress | |
| Gonda | 276 | Utraula North | Balabhadra Prasad Shukla | Indian National Congress | |
| Gonda | 277 | Utraula North East | Ummed Singh | Bharatiya Jan Sangh | |
| Gonda | 278 | Gonda West | Jwala Prasad Sinha | Akhil Bharatiya Hindu Mahasabha | |
| Gonda | 279 | Gonda East | Smt. Sajjan Devi Mahnot | Indian National Congress | |
| Gonda | 280 | Tarabganj South East-Gonda South | Ganga Prasad | Indian National Congress | |
| Gonda | 280 | Tarabganj South East-Gonda South | Baldev Singh | Independent politician | Elected in 1956 bypoll |
| Gonda | 280 | Tarabganj South East-Gonda South | Chandra Bhan Sharan Singh | Indian National Congress | |
| Gonda | 281 | Tarabganj West | Raghuraj Singh | Indian National Congress | |
| Gonda | 282 | Utraula South West | Amrit Nath Misra | Indian National Congress | |
| Basti | 283 | Domariyaganj North West | Ram Lakhan Mishra | Indian National Congress | |
| Basti | 284 | Domariyaganj North East-Bansi West | Mohammed Suleman Adhami | Indian National Congress | |
| Basti | 285 | Bansi South | Ram Kumar Shastri | Indian National Congress | |
| Basti | 286 | Bansi North | Mathura Prasad Pandey | Indian National Congress | |
| Basti | 286 | Bansi North | Puddan Ram | Indian National Congress | |
| Basti | 287 | Basti East | Ansman Singh | Indian National Congress | |
| Basti | 288 | Basti West | Prabhu Dayal | Indian National Congress | |
| Basti | 288 | Basti West | Ram Lal | Indian National Congress | |
| Basti | 289 | Domariyaganj West | Shivmangal Singh Kapoor | Indian National Congress | |
| Basti | 290 | Domariyaganj South | Qazi Muhammad Adil Abbasi | Indian National Congress | |
| Basti | 291 | Harraiya North West | Prabhakar Shukla | Indian National Congress | |
| Basti | 292 | Harraiya South West | Sitaram Shukla | Indian National Congress | |
| Basti | 293 | Harraiya East-Basti West | Kripa Shankar | Indian National Congress | |
| Basti | 293 | Harraiya East-Basti West | Shiv Narayan | Indian National Congress | |
| Basti | 294 | Khalilabad South | Ram Sunder Ram | Indian National Congress | |
| Basti | 294 | Khalilabad South | Dhanushdhari Pandey | Indian National Congress | |
| Basti | 295 | Khalilabad Central | Muhammad Abdul Muij Khan | Indian National Congress | |
| Basti | 296 | Khalilabad North | Raja Ram Sharma | Indian National Congress | |
| Gorakhpur | 297 | Bansgaon South West | Yashoda Devi | Indian National Congress | |
| Gorakhpur | 297 | Bansgaon South West | Ganesh Prasad Pandey | Indian National Congress | |
| Gorakhpur | 298 | Bansgaon South East | Brigunath Chaturvedi | Indian National Congress | |
| Gorakhpur | 299 | Bansgaon Central | Kesh Bhan Rai | Indian National Congress | |
| Gorakhpur | 300 | Bansgaon East-Gorakhpur South | Bhagwati Prasad Dubey | Indian National Congress | |
| Gorakhpur | 301 | Gorakhpur Central | Istafa Husain | Indian National Congress | |
| Gorakhpur | 302 | Gorakhpur North East | Mahadev Prasad | Indian National Congress | |
| Gorakhpur | 302 | Gorakhpur North East | Keshav Pandey | Indian National Congress | |
| Gorakhpur | 303 | Gorakhpur South East | Akshayvar Singh | Indian National Congress | |
| Gorakhpur | 304 | Pharendra South | Dwarika Prasad Pandey | Indian National Congress | |
| Gorakhpur | 305 | Gorakhpur West | Devendra Pratap Narayan | Indian National Congress | |
| Gorakhpur | 306 | Pharendra Central | Gauri Ram | Indian National Congress | |
| Gorakhpur | 307 | Pharendra North | Ramawadh Singh | Indian National Congress | |
| Gorakhpur | 308 | Mahrajganj North | Paripurnanand Verma | Indian National Congress | |
| Gorakhpur | 309 | Mahrajganj South | Thakur Ram Prasad Singh | Indian National Congress | |
| Gorakhpur | 309 | Mahrajganj South | Shukdev Prasad | Indian National Congress | |
| Deoria | 310 | Deoria South | Rameshwar Lal | Praja Socialist Party | Elected in 1952 bypoll |
| Deoria | 310 | Deoria South | Ramnath Tiwari | Indian National Congress | |
| Deoria | 311 | Salempur West | Dev Nandan Shukla | Indian National Congress | |
| Deoria | 312 | Salempur South | Badri Narayan Mishra | Indian National Congress | |
| Deoria | 313 | Salempur East | Sachchidanand Nath Tripathi | Indian National Congress | |
| Deoria | 314 | Salempur North | Shiv Bachan Rai | Indian National Congress | |
| Deoria | 315 | Deoria South West-Hata South West | Ramji Sahai | Indian National Congress | |
| Deoria | 315 | Deoria South West-Hata South West | Dr. Sitaram | Indian National Congress | |
| Deoria | 316 | Hata North | Rajdev Upadhyay | Indian National Congress | |
| Deoria | 316 | Hata North | Mahaveer Singh | Indian National Congress | Elected in 1952 bypoll |
| Deoria | 317 | Hata Central | Shiv Prasad | Indian National Congress | |
| Deoria | 317 | Hata Central | Surya Bali Pandey | Indian National Congress | |
| Deoria | 318 | Deoria North East | Muhammad Farooq Chishti | Indian National Congress | |
| Deoria | 319 | Padrauna South West-Deoria South East | Rajvanshi | Praja Socialist Party | |
| Deoria | 320 | Padrauna North | Jagannath Mall | Praja Socialist Party | |
| Deoria | 321 | Padrauna East | Genda Singh | Praja Socialist Party | |
| Deoria | 322 | Padrauna West | Ram Subhag Verma | Praja Socialist Party | |
| Azamgarh | 323 | Ghosi East | Ramsunder Pandey | Praja Socialist Party | |
| Azamgarh | 324 | Ghosi West | Jharkhandey Rai | Uttar Pradesh Revolutionary Socialist Party | |
| Azamgarh | 325 | Mohammadabad North-Ghosi South | Srinath Ram | Indian National Congress | |
| Azamgarh | 325 | Mohammadabad North-Ghosi South | Habiburrahman Azmi | Indian National Congress | |
| Azamgarh | 326 | Phulpur North | Brij Bihari Mishra | Indian National Congress | |
| Azamgarh | 327 | Phulpur South | Asha Lata Vyas | Indian National Congress | |
| Azamgarh | 327 | Phulpur South | Ram Vachan Yadav | Indian National Congress | |
| Azamgarh | 328 | Lalganj South | Kalika Singh | Indian National Congress | |
| Azamgarh | 329 | Lalganj North | Tej Bahadur | Swatantra Party | |
| Azamgarh | 330 | Mohammadabad-Gohna South | Padmnath Singh | Indian National Congress | |
| Azamgarh | 331 | Sadar Azamgarh Tahsil | Shivram Rai | Indian National Congress | |
| Azamgarh | 331 | Sadar Azamgarh Tahsil | Suruju Ram | Indian National Congress | |
| Azamgarh | 332 | Sagri West | Uma Shankar | Praja Socialist Party | |
| Azamgarh | 333 | Sagri East | Satyanand | Indian National Congress | |
| Azamgarh | 333 | Sagri East | Vishram Rai | Bharatiya Kranti Dal | Elected in 1952 bypoll as Praja Socialist Party candidate. Subsequently joined Bharatiya Kranti Dal. |
| Ballia | 334 | Ballia East | Radha Mohan Singh | Indian National Congress | |
| Ballia | 335 | Ballia Central | Ram Anant Pandey | Indian National Congress | |
| Ballia | 336 | Ballia North East-Bansih South West | Jagannath Singh | Indian National Congress | |
| Ballia | 337 | Bansdih West | Shiv Mangal | Indian National Congress | |
| Ballia | 338 | Bansdih Central | Baijnath Prasad Singh | Independent politician | |
| Ballia | 339 | Rasra East-Ballia South West | Mandhata Singh | Indian National Congress | |
| Ballia | 339 | Rasra East-Ballia South West | Ram Ratan Prasad | Indian National Congress | |
| Ballia | 340 | Rasra West | Ganga Prasad Singh | Indian National Congress | |
| Ghazipur | 341 | Ghazipur Central-Mohammadabad North West | Yamuna Singh | Praja Socialist Party | |
| Ghazipur | 342 | Mohammadabad North East | Shiv Pujan Rai | Praja Socialist Party | |
| Ghazipur | 343 | Mohammadabad South | Vijay Shankar Prasad | Indian National Congress | |
| Ghazipur | 344 | Ghazipur West | Vishwanath Singh Gautam | Indian National Congress | |
| Ghazipur | 345 | Ghazipur South East | Vashist Narayan Sharma | Indian National Congress | |
| Ghazipur | 346 | Ghazipur South West | Bhola | Praja Socialist Party | |
| Ghazipur | 347 | Saidpur | Dev Ram | Indian National Congress | |
| Ghazipur | 347 | Saidpur | Kamla Singh | Independent politician | |
| Anglo-Indian | | | A. C. Grais | Nominated | |

== See also ==
- Uttar Pradesh Legislative Assembly
- 16th Vidhan Sabha of Uttar Pradesh
- Government of Uttar Pradesh
- History of Uttar Pradesh
- Politics of India
