= List of speakers of the Uttar Pradesh Legislative Assembly =

Highest authority of the Legislative Assembly of Uttar Pradesh

Speaker of Uttar Pradesh Legislative Assembly
- Seal of the Government of Uttar Pradesh
- Incumbent; Satish Mahana since 29 March 2022
- Style: The Honourable (formal); Mr. Speaker (informal)
- Type: Speaker
- Status: Highest authority and presiding officer of the Legislative Assembly
- Member of: Uttar Pradesh Legislative Assembly
- Reports to: Government of Uttar Pradesh
- Residence: 16, Kalidas Marg, Lucknow
- Seat: Vidhan Bhavan, Lucknow
- Nominator: Members of the Legislative Assembly
- Term length: During the life of the Legislative Assembly (five years maximum; renewable)
- Inaugural holder: Purushottam Das Tandon
- Deputy: Deputy Speaker of the Legislative Assembly

The Speaker of the Uttar Pradesh Legislative Assembly is the presiding officer of the Legislative Assembly of Uttar Pradesh, the main law-making body for the Indian state of Uttar Pradesh. The Speaker is elected in the very first meeting of the Uttar Pradesh Legislative Assembly after the general elections for a term of 5 years from amongst the members of the assembly. Speakers hold office until ceasing to be a member of the assembly or resigning from the office. The Speaker can be removed from office by a resolution passed in the assembly by an effective majority of its members. In the absence of Speaker, the meeting of Uttar Pradesh Legislative Assembly is presided by the Deputy Speaker.

== Eligibility ==
The Speaker of the Assembly:

1. Must be a citizen of India;
2. Must not be less than 25 years of age; and
3. Should not hold any office of profit under the Government of Uttar Pradesh.

== Powers and functions of the Speaker ==
The speaker of the legislative assembly conducts the business in house, and decides whether a bill is a money bill or not. They maintain discipline and decorum in the house and can punish a member for their unruly behaviour by suspending them. They also permit the moving of various kinds of motions and resolutions such as a motion of no confidence, motion of adjournment, motion of censure and calling attention notice as per the rules. The speaker decides on the agenda to be taken up for discussion during the meeting. The date of election of the speaker is fixed by the Governor of Uttar Pradesh. Further, all comments and speeches made by members of the House are addressed to the speaker. The speaker is answerable to the house. Both the speaker and deputy speaker may be removed by a resolution passed by the majority of the members.

== List of the Speakers ==
No	Portrait	Name	Constituency	Term			Assembly	Party
1		Purushottam Das Tandon		31 July 1937	10 August 1950	13 years, 10 days		Indian National Congress
2		Nafisul Hasan		21 December 1950	19 May 1952	1 year, 150 days		Indian National Congress
3		Atmaram Govind Kher	Garautha	20 May 1952	10 April 1957	9 years, 310 days	1st	Indian National Congress
3		Atmaram Govind Kher	Garautha	10 April 1957	26 March 1962	9 years, 310 days	2nd	Indian National Congress
4		Madan Mohan Verma	Faizabad	26 March 1962	16 March 1967	4 years, 355 days	3rd	Indian National Congress
5		Jagdish Saran Agarwal	Bareilly City	17 March 1967	16 March 1969	1 year, 364 days	4th	Indian National Congress
(3)		Atmaram Govind Kher	Garautha	17 March 1969	18 March 1974	5 years, 1 day	5th	Indian National Congress
6		Vasudev Singh	Gadwara	18 March 1974	12 July 1977	3 years, 116 days	6th	Indian National Congress
7		Banarasi Das	Hapur	12 July 1977	26 February 1979	1 year, 229 days	7th	Janata Party
Acting		Jagannath Prasad		27 February 1979	17 February 1980	355 days	7th	Indian National Congress
8		Sripati Mishra	Isauli	7 July 1980	18 July 1982	2 years, 11 days	8th	Indian National Congress
Acting		Yadvendra Singh		19 July 1982	24 August 1982	36 days	8th	Indian National Congress
9		Dharam Singh		25 August 1982	15 March 1985	2 years, 202 days	8th	Indian National Congress
10		Niyaz Hasan Khan	Kunda	15 March 1985	9 January 1990	4 years, 300 days	9th	Indian National Congress
11		Harikishan Srivastava	Chaubepur	9 January 1990	30 July 1991	1 year, 202 days	10th	Janata Dal
12		Keshari Nath Tripathi	Allahabad South	30 July 1991	15 December 1993	2 years, 138 days	11th	Bharatiya Janata Party
13		Dhaniram Verma	Bidhuna	15 December 1993	20 June 1995	1 year, 187 days	12th	Samajwadi Party
Acting		Barkhu Ram Verma	Sagri	20 June 1995	17 July 1995	17 days	12th	Bahujan Samaj Party
14		Barkhu Ram Verma	Sagri	18 July 1995	26 March 1997	1 year, 251 days	12th	Bahujan Samaj Party
(12)		Keshari Nath Tripathi	Allahabad South	27 March 1997	14 May 2002	7 years, 53 days	13th	Bharatiya Janata Party
(12)		Keshari Nath Tripathi	Allahabad South	14 May 2002	19 May 2004	7 years, 53 days	14th	Bharatiya Janata Party
Acting		Waqar Ahmad Shah	Bahraich	19 May 2004	26 July 2004	68 days	14th	Samajwadi Party
15		Mata Prasad Pandey	Itwa	26 July 2004	18 May 2007	2 years, 296 days	14th	Samajwadi Party
16		Sukhdev Rajbhar	Lalganj	18 May 2007	13 April 2012	4 years, 331 days	15th	Bahujan Samaj Party
(15)		Mata Prasad Pandey	Itwa	13 April 2012	30 March 2017	4 years, 351 days	16th	Samajwadi Party
17		Hriday Narayan Dikshit	Bhagwantnagar	30 March 2017	29 March 2022	4 years, 364 days	17th	Bharatiya Janata Party
18		Satish Mahana	Maharajpur	29 March 2022	Incumbent	4 years, 162 days	18th	Bharatiya Janata Party

== List of the Deputy Speakers ==
No	Portrait	Name	Constituency	Term			Assembly
1		Abdul Hakim		31 July 1937	28 October 1939	2 years, 89 days	
2		Nafisul Hasan		29 July 1946	21 December 1950	4 years, 145 days	
3		Hargovind Pant		2 January 1951	9 April 1957	6 years, 97 days	1st
4		Ramnarayan Tripathi		27 April 1957	6 March 1962	4 years, 313 days	2nd
5		Hoti Lal Agrawal		16 April 1962	14 February 1967	4 years, 304 days	3rd
6		Shripati Mishra		19 June 1967	14 April 1968	300 days	4th
7		Vasudev Singh		25 March 1969	4 March 1974	4 years, 344 days	5th
8		Shivnath Singh Kushwaha	Ghatampur	21 February 1975	30 April 1977	2 years, 68 days	6th
9		Jagannath Prasad		13 May 1978	17 February 1980	1 year, 280 days	7th
10		Yadvendra Singh		5 September 1980	14 December 1982	2 years, 100 days	8th
11		Hukum Singh		14 September 1984	10 March 1985	177 days	8th
12		Trilok Chandra		5 September 1985	29 November 1989	4 years, 85 days	9th
13		Surendra Singh Chouhan		7 March 1990	4 April 1991	1 year, 28 days	10th
14		Ram Asrey Varma		28 February 1992	6 December 1992	282 days	11th
15		Ammar Rizvi		28 September 2001	20 January 2002	114 days	13th
16		Waiqar Ahmed Shah	Bahraich	14 November 2003	26 July 2004	255 days	14th
17		Rajesh Agarwal	Bareilly	30 July 2004	13 May 2007	2 years, 287 days	14th

== See also ==
- Government of Uttar Pradesh
- Governor of Uttar Pradesh
- Chief Minister of Uttar Pradesh
- Uttar Pradesh Legislative Assembly
- Speaker of the Lok Sabha
- Chairman of the Rajya Sabha
- List of current Indian legislative speakers and chairmen
