= Nihaluddin =

Indian politician (1902–1974)

Nihaluddin (1902–1974) was an Indian politician. Hailing from Budaun, he represented his home district in the U.P. Legislative Assembly from 1946-1953. During his first legislative mandate he belonged to the All India Muslim League, later representing the Socialist Party.

== Youth ==
He was born in 1902 in Budaun. He attended school and later higher studies at Budaun, Shahjahanpur, Bareilly, Allahabad and Aligarh. He worked as a teacher in Roorkee and Aonla. He began to practice Law, having joined the Bar in 1930.

== Legislator ==
In 1943 he left his Law practice and became involved in politics full-time, belonging to the All India Muslim League. He was elected to the United Provinces Legislative Assembly from the Budaun District, East constituency in the 1946 elections.

Nihaluddin contested the Budaun North constituency in the 1957 Uttar Pradesh Legislative Assembly election, standing as a Socialist Party candidate. He won the seat, obtaining 8,364 votes (33.87%). After the election, on March 20, 1952 Nihaluddin was put forth as the Opposition candidate for the post of Speaker of the Legislative Assembly, confronting the Indian National Congress Speaker candidate Atmaram Govind Kher. Kher won the election with 366 votes against 24 votes for Nihaluddin. Nihaluddin was later removed from the Uttar Pradesh Legislative Assembly, as the 1952 election in Budaun North was declared void due to improper rejection of nomination papers. A by-election to fill the Budaun North seat was held in May 1953. Nihaluddin contested the by-election as a Praja Socialist Party candidate, and finished in third place with 6,525 votes (21.89%).

== Later years ==
He was linked to the Meston Islamia Inter College in Budaun, and served as the Manager of the school between 1957 and 1960. Nihaluddin died in 1974.
