= Safia Abdul Wajid =

Indian political activist and elected officeholder

Member of the Uttar Pradesh Legislative Assembly
- In office 1952–1957
- Constituency: Bareilly East

Safia Abdul Wajid, also known as Begum Abdul Wajid, was an Indian educator, political activist and an elected representative in the State Assembly of Uttar Pradesh (UP). She became an active participant in the Indian independence movement after quitting her position as a Mathematics lecturer at a government institution during the 1942 Quit India Movement to protest British rule.

She was elected to the Moradabad (North-East) constituency of the United Provinces Legislative Assembly, having contested as a 'Nationalist Muslim' candidate in the 1946 Indian provincial elections.

Post-independence, she remained active in politics and served as a Member of Legislative Assembly (MLA) from the Bareilly East constituency of Uttar Pradesh, having won the election to the seat in 1952 (1st Uttar Pradesh Assembly). She was one of the first female members (MLA) of a State Legislative Assembly in independent India and, thus far, one of the few Muslim women to be elected to the UP State Assembly.

She was married to Maulvi Abdul Wajid, an advocate and freedom fighter himself, who was elected to the Rohilkhand and Kumaun Divisions constituency in 1938 and was subsequently imprisoned by the British in 1941 for his role in the Indian independence movement.

== See also ==
1st Uttar Pradesh Assembly

Women's political participation in India

Indian independence activists
