= Hira Singh Bisht =

Indian politician (1940–2026)

Member of Legislative Assembly for Doiwala
- In office 2014–2017

Member of Legislative Assembly for Rajpur
- In office 2002–2007

Personal details
- Born: 4 November 1940 Pauri Garhwal district, United Provinces, British India (now in Uttarakhand, India)
- Died: 26 July 2026 (aged 85) Dehradun, Uttarakhand, India
- Party: Indian National Congress
- Spouse: Premlata Bisht (died 2022)

Hira Singh Bisht (4 November 1940 – 26 July 2026) was an Indian politician from Uttarakhand and a three-term Member of the Uttarakhand Legislative Assembly. Bisht represented the Doiwala (Uttarakhand Assembly constituency), and was a member of the Indian National Congress.

== Life and career ==
Bisht served as a cabinet minister in the cabinet of former Chief Minister Shri N. D. Tiwari with portfolios of transport, Labour, technical education. He also served as the INTUC president of Uttarakhand.

He was the founder member of Cricket association of Uttarakhand.

During his first term as MLA, he allotted land for Raipur Cricket stadium from Shri veer Bahadur who was chief minister of Uttar Pradesh at that time and completed that project in 2017 during Vijay Bahuguna and Harish Rawat Government in Uttarakhand.

His wife, Premlata, died in 2022 following a prolonged illness. Bisht died on 26 July 2026, at the age of 85, after suffering a heart attack while being treated at a hospital in Dehradun.

== Positions held ==
Year	Description
1985	Elected to 9th Uttar Pradesh Assembly
2002	Elected to 1st Uttarakhand Assembly (2nd term): Cabinet Minister
2014	Elected to 3rd Uttarakhand Assembly in by election (3rd term)

== Elections contested ==
Year	Election Type	Constituency	Result	Vote percentage	Opposition Candidate	Opposition Party	Opposition vote percentage	Ref
1977	MP	Tehri Garhwal	Lost	29.07%	Trepan Singh Negi	BLD	58.47%	
1985	MLA	Dehradun	Won	66.76%	Harbans Kapoor	BJP	22.85%	
1989	MLA	Dehradun	Lost	33.11%	Harbans Kapoor	BJP	42.84%	
1996	MLA	Mussoorie	Lost	18.20%	Rajendra Singh	BJP	49.38%	
1998	MP	Tehri Garhwal	Lost	15.88%	Manabendra Shah	BJP	51.82%	
2002	MLA	Rajpur	Won	34.98%	Khushal S Ranawat	BJP	28.07%	
2007	MLA	Rajpur	Lost	33.53%	Ganesh Joshi	BJP	39.27%	
2012	MLA	Doiwala	Lost	29.01%	Dr. Ramesh Pokhriyal	BJP	30.68%	
2014 (By Elect)	MLA	Doiwala	Won	52.07%	Trivendra Singh Rawat	BJP	42.65%	
2017	MLA	Doiwala	Lost	34.75%	Trivendra Singh Rawat	BJP	60.45%	
2022	MLA	Raipur	Lost	32.66%	Umesh Sharma 'Kau'	BJP	60.15%	
