= Hriday Narayan Dikshit =

Indian politician (born 1946)

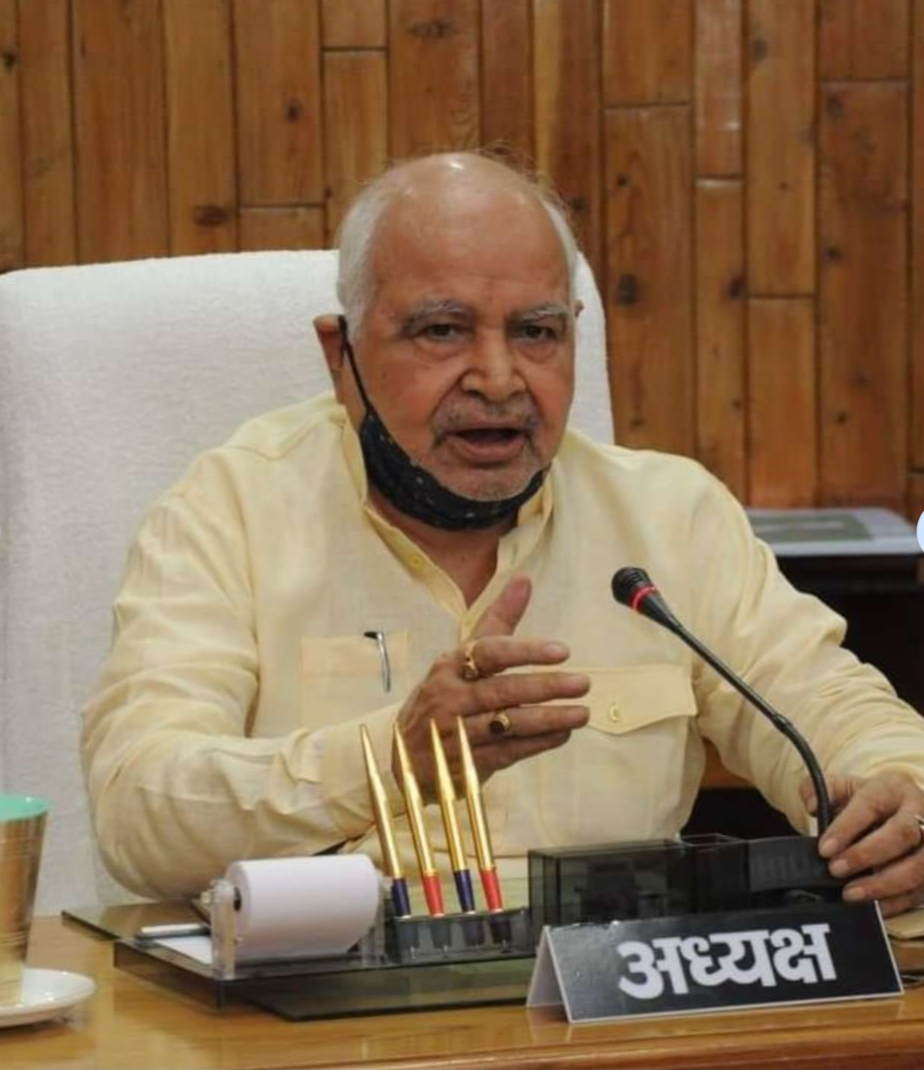
- Dikshit in 2017

17th Speaker of the Uttar Pradesh Legislative Assembly
- In office 30 March 2017 – 28 March 2022
- Governor: Ram Naik; Anandiben Patel
- Preceded by: Mata Prasad Pandey
- Succeeded by: Satish Mahana

Member of Uttar Pradesh Legislative Assembly
- In office 1985–1996
- Constituency: Purwa
- In office 11 March 2017 – 10 March 2022
- Constituency: Bhagwantnagar

Member of Uttar Pradesh Legislative Council
- In office 7 July 2010 – 6 July 2016
- Constituency: Elected by the MLAs

Minister of Legislative Affairs & Panchayati Raj of Uttar Pradesh
- In office 26 June 1995 – 18 October 1995
- Chief Minister: Kumari Mayawati

Personal details
- Born: 25 December 1946 (age 79) Unnao, United Provinces, British India
- Party: Bharatiya Janata Party
- Spouse: Madhuri Dixit
- Children: 5
- Education: M.A (Economics), Kanpur University
- Occupation: Politician
- Awards: Padma Shri (2025); Ganesh Shanker Vidhyarthi Award; Bhanu Pratap Shukla Journalism Award; Deendayal and Upadhyay Award; Rastriya Sahitya Sarjak Award; Baburao Paradkar Vishnu Patrakarita Shikhar Samman; Rangbharti and Dr. Hadgewar Pragya Samman (2019)
- Nickname: Pandit Ji

Hriday Narayan Dikshit (born 25 December 1946) is an Indian politician and a former speaker of the Uttar Pradesh Legislative Assembly. He was a member of the Ninth, Tenth, Eleventh, Twelfth and Seventeenth Vidhan Sabha, currently representing Bhagwantnagar (Assembly constituency) of Unnao district.

Hriday Narayan Dikshit received Padma Shri for literature and education in 2025.

== Career ==
Hriday Narayan Dixit became an MLA from Bhagwantnagar in Unnao district, defeating BSP's Shashank Shekhar Singh by 53,366 votes.

Dixit is from Louva village of Purva tehsil in Unnao. He first became an MLA in 1985 after contesting as an Independent. In 1989, he became an MLA on a Janata Dal ticket. He later left the Janata Dal for the Samajwadi Party and in 1993, he was elected MLA for the third time. In 1995, during the SP-BSP coalition government, he was the Minister of Parliamentary Affairs and the Minister of Panchayati Raj. From 2010 to 2016, he was a BJP Legislative Council member and party leader. Dixit won the Bhagwantnagar seat on a BJP ticket, becoming an MLA for the fourth time.

During The Emergency in India, which was imposed in the country from 26 June 1975 to 21 March 1977, Dixit was also imprisoned for 19 months.

Dixit is also a writer. His articles have been published in newspapers like The Hindu and Navbharat Times.

== Other works ==
Dixit also works as a journalist. He is an author and has written several books. His chief literary works are Madhu Abhilasha, Deen Dayal Upadhyay: Drashta, Drishti aur Darshan and Hind Swaraj ka Punarpaath.
