= Anoop Nautiyal =

Indian social activist

Anoop Nautiyal is a social activist based in Dehradun, Uttarakhand. His work has focused on issues of environment and sustainable development of the state. He is the founder of Social Development Communities Foundation, an NGO and think tank based in Dehradun, which works at the grassroots level for the empowerment of communities, as well as the sustainable development of the mountain state of Uttarakhand. He is a prolific social communicator and has also been a columnist for the Indian Express.

He had a brief foray in the political space and contested the 2017 Uttarakhand Legislative Assembly election.

Anoop Nautiyal attended Shri Ram College of Commerce and National Institute of Fashion Technology in New Delhi.
