= Rajpur, Uttarakhand Assembly constituency =

Former constituency of the Uttarakhand Legislative Assembly, in India

Coordinates: 29.28°N 78.77°E

Rajpur
- Former constituency for the Uttarakhand Legislative Assembly

Constituency details
- Country: India
- Region: North India
- State: Uttarakhand
- District: Dehradun
- Established: 2002
- Abolished: 2012

Rajpur Legislative Assembly constituency was one of the seventy electoral Uttarakhand Legislative Assembly constituencies of Uttarakhand state in India. It was abolished in 2012 following the delimitation.

Rajpur Legislative Assembly constituency was a part of Tehri Garhwal (Lok Sabha constituency).

== Members of Legislative Assembly ==
| Assembly | Duration | Member | Party |
|---|---|---|---|
| 1st | 2002–2007 | Hira Singh Bisht | Indian National Congress |
| 2nd | 2007–2012 | Ganesh Joshi | Bharatiya Janata Party |

== Election results ==
=== Assembly Election 2007 ===
2007 Uttarakhand Legislative Assembly election: Rajpur, Uttarakhand
| Party | Candidate | Votes | % | ±% |
|---|---|---|---|---|
| BJP | Ganesh Joshi | 24,446 | 38.82% | ▲10.75 |
| INC | Hira Singh Bisht | 20,876 | 33.15% | ▼1.83 |
| BSP | Ajay Sood | 8,403 | 13.34% | ▲11.17 |
| UKD | Vivekanand Khanduri | 3,816 | 6.06% | ▼0.03 |
| NCP | Sunder Singh Pundir | 1,667 | 2.65% | ▼13.85 |
| Independent | Balesh Bavaniya | 402 | 0.64% | New |
| SP | Sayeed Ahmad | 399 | 0.63% | ▼1.09 |
| Independent | Rajkumar | 357 | 0.57% | New |
| Independent | S. K. Rai | 331 | 0.53% | New |
| BJSH | K. S. Bangari | 316 | 0.50% | New |
| Margin of victory | | 3,570 | 5.67% | ▼1.24 |
| Turnout | | 62,973 | 56.20% | ▲13.32 |
| Registered electors | | 1,12,062 | | ▲19.54 |
| BJP gain from INC | | Swing | ▲3.84 | |

=== Assembly Election 2002 ===
2002 Uttaranchal Legislative Assembly election: Rajpur, Uttarakhand
| Party | Candidate | Votes | % | ±% |
|---|---|---|---|---|
| INC | Hira Singh Bisht | 14,061 | 34.98% | New |
| BJP | Khushal Singh Ranavat | 11,282 | 28.07% | New |
| NCP | Suryakant Dhasmana | 6,630 | 16.49% | New |
| UKD | Shushila Balooni | 2,449 | 6.09% | New |
| CPI(M) | Lekh Raj | 876 | 2.18% | New |
| BSP | D. C. Verma | 874 | 2.17% | New |
| Independent | Hari Bhandari | 804 | 2.00% | New |
| LJP | Purushottam Kumar Agarwal Alias P. K. | 762 | 1.90% | New |
| SP | M. Farid | 691 | 1.72% | New |
| Shivsena | Arvind Singh | 623 | 1.55% | New |
| Independent | Sanjay Kundaliya | 341 | 0.85% | New |
| Margin of victory | | 2,779 | 6.91% | |
| Turnout | | 40,195 | 42.88% | |
| Registered electors | | 93,746 | | |
| INC win (new seat) | | | | |

== See also ==
- Rajpur Road (Uttarakhand Assembly constituency)
