= Harbans Kapoor =

Indian politician (1946–2021)

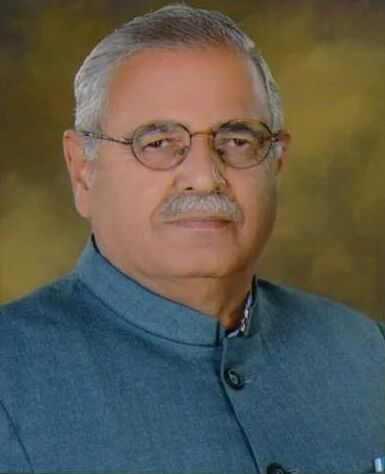

Member of Legislative Assembly for Dehradun Cantonment
- In office 1989–2021

Speaker Uttarakhand Legislative Assembly
- In office 2007–2012

Minister of State Urban Development Government of Uttarakhand
- In office 2001–2002

Minister of State Rural Development, Labour & Unemployment Government of Uttar Pradesh
- In office 17 July 1991 – 6 December 1992

Personal details
- Born: 7 January 1946 Bannu, North-West Frontier Province, British India (Present-day Khyber Pakhtunkhwa, Pakistan)
- Died: 13 December 2021 (aged 75) Dehradun, Uttarakhand, India
- Party: Bhartiya Janta Party
- Website: Official website

Harbans Kapoor (7 January 1946 – 13 December 2021) was an Indian politician who was a senior leader of the Bharatiya Janata Party (BJP) in Uttarakhand State. He was Speaker of the Uttarakhand Legislative Assembly from 2007 to 2012. He was elected to the assembly from Dehra Khas constituency. After the first defeat in 1985, he never lost Legislative Assembly elections and won for a record eight terms in a row (four times as the member of the Uttar Pradesh Legislative Assembly and four as the member of the Uttarakhand Legislative Assembly) from Dehradun.

== Early life and education ==
Kapoor was born in Bannu, North-West Frontier Province in 1946 to a Hindkowan Hindu family. His family settled in Dehradun after Partition of India. He completed his early schooling from St. Joseph's Academy, Dehradun. He graduated in Law from D.A.V. Post Graduate College, Dehradun.

== Politics ==
Starting as a grass root level politician, he joined the Uttar Pradesh Vidhan Sabha in 1989 as a member of the 10th Uttar Pradesh Vidhan Sabha from Dehradun constituency, followed by the 11th Vidhan Sabha, 12th Vidhan Sabha and the 13th Vidhan Sabha. He also maintained his victory in the first election of the new state of Uttarakhand in 2002 and continued his victory spree in all the elections after the inception. In 2007, he was unanimously elected the Speaker of Uttarakhand Assembly. He was one of the oldest leaders in Uttarakhand BJP.

== Later life ==
Kapoor died on 13 December 2021, at the age of 75 at his home in Dehradun from Heart Attack.

== Positions held ==
Year	Description
1989 - 1991	Elected to 10th Uttar Pradesh Assembly
1991 - 1993	Elected to 11th Uttar Pradesh Assembly: Minister of State for Rural Development (1991-92)
1993 - 1996	Elected to 12th Uttar Pradesh Assembly: Member - Committee on Petitions (1993-95)
1996 - 2000	Elected to 13th Uttar Pradesh Assembly: Member - Public Accounts Committee (1997-98)
2000 - 2002	Elected to Interim Uttaranchal Assembly: Minister of State for Urban Development, Housing, Labour and Employment (2001-02)
2002 - 2007	Elected to 1st Uttarakhand Assembly: Member - Public Accounts Committee (2002-04); Member - Committee on Assembly Rules (2002-04); Member - Committee on Housing (2004-07)
2007 - 2012	Elected to 2nd Uttarakhand Assembly: Speaker - Uttarakhand Legislative Assembly (2007-12); Chairman - Committee on Assembly Rules (2007-12); Chairman - Business Advisory Committee (2008-12)
2012 - 2017	Elected to 3rd Uttarakhand Assembly
2017 - 2021	Elected to 4th Uttarakhand Assembly

== Elections contested ==
Year	Constituency	Result	Vote percentage	Opposition Candidate	Opposition Party	Opposition vote percentage	Ref
1985	Dehradun	Lost	22.85%	Hira Singh Bisht	INC	66.76%	
1989	Dehradun	Won	42.84%	Hira Singh Bisht	INC	31.11%	
1991	Dehradun	Won	54.14%	Vinod Chandola	INC	31.30%	
1993	Dehradun	Won	53.74%	Dinesh Agrawal	INC	38.55%	
1996	Dehradun	Won	56.37%	Dinesh Agrawal	INC	17.98%	
2002	Dehradun Cantonment	Won	NA	Sanjay Sharma	INC	NA	
2007	Dehradun Cantonment	Won	NA	Lal Chand Sharma	INC	NA	
2012	Dehradun Cantonment	Won	NA	Devendra Singh Sethi	INC	NA	
2017	Dehradun Cantonment	Won	56.99%	Suryakant Dhasmana	INC	33.90%	
