= Deep Narayan Singh Yadav =

Indian politician

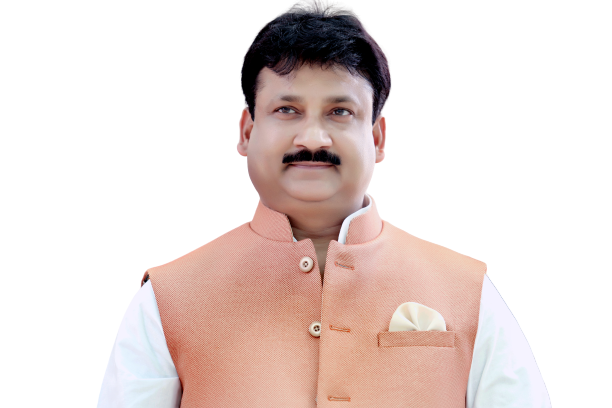

Member of the Uttar Pradesh Legislative Assembly
- In office 2007–2017
- Preceded by: Brijendra Kumar Vyas
- Succeeded by: Jawahar Lal Rajput
- Constituency: Garautha

Personal details
- Born: 21 July 1969 (age 56) Jhansi, Uttar Pradesh
- Party: Samajwadi Party
- Children: Shivangi, Shivali, Deepankar

Deep Narayan Singh Yadav alias Deepak Dadda (born 21 July 1969) is an Indian politician who is a former member of the Uttar Pradesh Legislative Assembly from the Garautha Assembly constituency since 2007 to 2017, won over the symbol of Samajwadi Party.
