= Jawahar Lal Rajput =

Indian politician (born 1963)

Member of Uttar Pradesh Legislative Assembly
- Incumbent
- Assumed office March 2017
- Preceded by: Deep Narayan Singh Yadav
- Constituency: Garautha

Personal details
- Born: 1 January 1963 (age 63) Jhansi, Uttar Pradesh
- Party: Bharatiya Janata Party
- Profession: Politician

Jawahar Lal Rajput is an Indian politician and a member of the 18th Uttar Pradesh Assembly from the Garautha Assembly constituency of the Jhansi district. He is a member of the Bharatiya Janata Party.

== Early life ==
Jawahar Lal Rajput was born on 1 January 1963 in Jhansi, Uttar Pradesh, to a Hindu family of Kishori Saran Rajput. He married Manorama Rajput on 4 July 1986, and they have two children.

== Posts held ==
| # | From | To | Position | Ref |
|---|---|---|---|---|
| 01 | March 2017 | March 2022 | Member, 17th Uttar Pradesh Assembly | |
| 02 | March 2022 | Incumbent | Member, 18th Uttar Pradesh Assembly | |

== See also ==
- 18th Uttar Pradesh Assembly
- Garautha Assembly constituency
- Uttar Pradesh Legislative Assembly
