= Doiwala Assembly constituency =

Constituency of the Uttarakhand legislative assembly in India

Coordinates: 30.18°N 78.12°E

Doiwala
- Constituency No. 23 for the Uttarakhand Legislative Assembly

Constituency details
- Country: India
- Region: North India
- State: Uttarakhand
- District: Dehradun
- Lok Sabha constituency: Haridwar
- Total electors: 165,776 (2022)
- Reservation: None

Member of Legislative Assembly
- 5th Uttarakhand Legislative Assembly
- Incumbent Brij Bhushan Gairola
- Party: Bharatiya Janata Party
- Elected year: 2022

Doiwala Legislative Assembly constituency is one of the 70 electoral Uttarakhand Legislative Assembly constituencies of Uttarakhand state in India.

Doiwala Legislative Assembly constituency, currently is a part of Haridwar parliamentary constituency as per the delimitation in 2008. Prior to the delimitation in 2008, it was a part of Tehri parliamentary constituency. The constituency also covers 10 wards each of the Dehradun and Rishikesh municipal corporations.

== Members of the Legislative Assembly ==
Year	Name	Party
2002	Trivendra Singh Rawat	Bharatiya Janata Party
2007	Trivendra Singh Rawat	Bharatiya Janata Party
Major boundary changes
2012	Ramesh Pokhriyal 'Nishank'	Bharatiya Janata Party
2014^	Hira Singh Bisht	Indian National Congress
2017	Trivendra Singh Rawat	Bharatiya Janata Party
2022	Brij Bhushan Gairola	Bharatiya Janata Party

^By poll

== Election results ==
=== 2027 Assembly election ===
2027 Uttarakhand Legislative Assembly election: Doiwala
Party	Candidate	Votes	%	±%
INC				
BJP				
NOTA	None of the above			
Majority				
Turnout				
gain from		Swing		

=== Assembly Election 2022 ===
2022 Uttarakhand Legislative Assembly election: Doiwala
Party	Candidate	Votes	%	±%
BJP	Brij Bhushan Gairola	64,946	57.22%	▼3.23
INC	Gaurav (Ginni)	35,925	31.65%	▼3.10
Independent	Jitendra Singh Negi	4,785	4.22%	New
AAP	Raju Maurya 'Ketan'	3,387	2.98%	New
UKD	Shiv Prasad Semwal	1,873	1.65%	New
NOTA	None of the above	992	0.87%	▼0.15
BSP	Vinod Kumar	601	0.53%	▼1.09
Margin of victory		29,021	25.57%	▼0.13
Turnout		1,13,500	67.85%	▲0.01
Registered electors		1,67,288		▲17.26
BJP hold		Swing	▼3.23	

=== Assembly Election 2017 ===
2017 Uttarakhand Legislative Assembly election: Doiwala
Party	Candidate	Votes	%	±%
BJP	Trivendra Singh Rawat	58,502	60.45%	▲17.46
INC	Hira Singh Bisht	33,633	34.75%	▼17.73
BSP	A. Hameed	1,569	1.62%	New
NOTA	None of the above	994	1.03%	New
Margin of victory		24,869	25.70%	▲16.20
Turnout		96,779	67.84%	▲14.71
Registered electors		1,42,660		▲10.56
BJP gain from INC		Swing	▲7.96	

=== Assembly By-election 2014 ===
2014 Uttarakhand Legislative Assembly by-election: Doiwala
Party	Candidate	Votes	%	±%
INC	Hira Singh Bisht	35,980	52.49%	▲23.51
BJP	Trivendra Singh Rawat	29,468	42.99%	▲12.35
Independent	Furkan	1,508	2.20%	New
INC	None of the above	542	0.79%	▼28.18
Independent	William Akbhar Chand	363	0.53%	New
Independent	Rishi Kumar	348	0.51%	New
Margin of victory		6,512	9.50%	▲7.84
Turnout		68,550	53.55%	▼18.40
Registered electors		1,29,032		▲20.57
INC gain from BJP		Swing	▲21.85	

=== Assembly Election 2012 ===
2012 Uttarakhand Legislative Assembly election: Doiwala
Party	Candidate	Votes	%	±%
BJP	Ramesh Pokhriyal	23,448	30.63%	▼8.61
INC	Hira Singh Bisht	22,176	28.97%	▲4.46
Independent	S. P. Singh	11,241	14.69%	New
Independent	Jaideep Singh Negi	8,589	11.22%	New
BSP	Phool Singh	5,872	7.67%	▲2.79
UKD	Jitendra Mohan Sharma	674	0.88%	▼6.00
Moolniwasi Samaj Party	Dinesh Chandra	594	0.78%	New
URM	Bhargav Chandola	506	0.66%	New
Independent	Surendra Dutt Petwal	445	0.58%	New
Margin of victory		1,272	1.66%	▼13.07
Turnout		76,541	71.52%	▲15.51
Registered electors		1,07,015		▼37.48
BJP hold		Swing	▼8.61	

=== Assembly Election 2007 ===
2007 Uttarakhand Legislative Assembly election: Doiwala
Party	Candidate	Votes	%	±%
BJP	Trivendra Singh Rawat	37,629	39.24%	▲7.75
INC	Virendra Mohan Uniyal	23,502	24.51%	▼4.42
SP	Vinod Barthwal	9,452	9.86%	▼5.94
UKD	Rajpal Singh Rawat	6,600	6.88%	▲5.75
Independent	Umesh Sharma (Kau)	6,216	6.48%	New
BSP	Devendra Singh	4,683	4.88%	▲1.26
NCP	Purna Thapa	2,016	2.10%	▲1.36
RLD	Manish Kumar Nagpal	1,184	1.23%	▲0.40
BJSH	Anil Dhobal	1,039	1.08%	New
Gorkha Democratic Front	Ran Bahadur Nepali	667	0.70%	New
Independent	Ajay Kapil	569	0.59%	New
Margin of victory		14,127	14.73%	▲12.18
Turnout		95,884	56.02%	▲9.53
Registered electors		1,71,169		▲32.39
BJP hold		Swing	▲7.75	

=== Assembly Election 2002 ===
2002 Uttaranchal Legislative Assembly election: Doiwala
Party	Candidate	Votes	%	±%
BJP	Trivendra Singh Rawat	18,926	31.49%	New
INC	Virendra Mohan Uniyal	17,390	28.94%	New
SP	Vinod Barthwal	9,494	15.80%	New
Independent	Umesh Sharma	4,339	7.22%	New
BSP	Mahavir Prasad	2,177	3.62%	New
Independent	Vikram Singh Kshetri	2,102	3.50%	New
Independent	Mahipal Singh Kandari	726	1.21%	New
Independent	Prabhu Lal Bahuguna	715	1.19%	New
UKD	B. D. Raturi	679	1.13%	New
RLD	Rajendra Singh Bisht	502	0.84%	New
NCP	Leela	444	0.74%	New
Margin of victory		1,536	2.56%	
Turnout		60,100	46.54%	
Registered electors		1,29,289		
BJP win (new seat)				
