= United Provinces (1937–1950) =

Province of British India and later, the Dominion of India

Coordinates: 26.847°N 80.947°E

- Province of British India (1937–1947); Dominion of India (1947–1950)
- 1937–1950
- Flag during British Raj Coat of arms

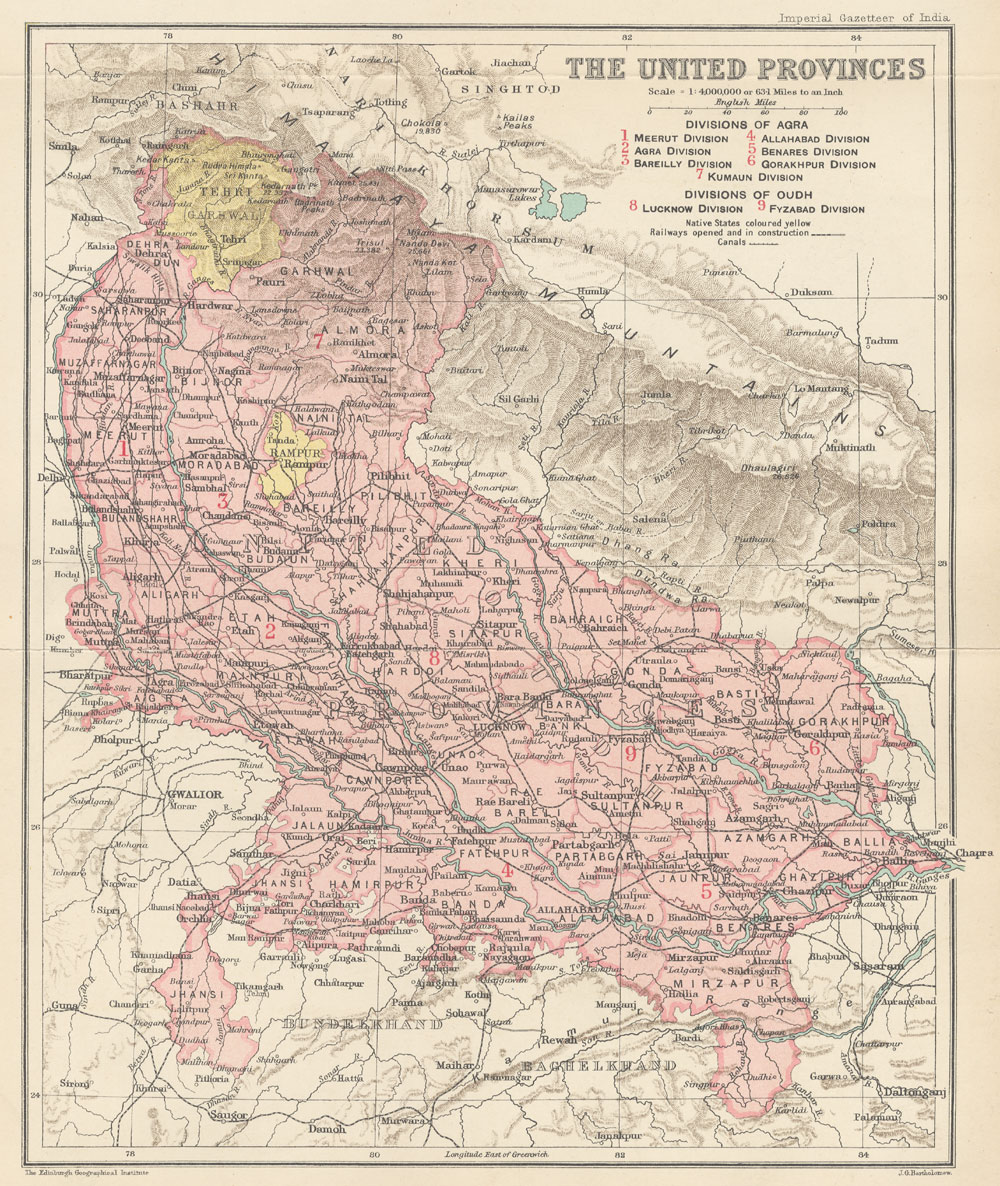
- Map of the United Provinces
- Capital: Lucknow
- History
  - Established: 1937
  - Disestablished: 1950
Preceded by
United Provinces of Agra and Oudh
Rampur State
Benares State
Garhwal Kingdom
Succeeded by
Uttar Pradesh
- Today part of: Uttar Pradesh; Uttarakhand

The United Provinces (UP) was a province of British India and, subsequently, independent India.

== History ==
The United Provinces came into existence on 1 April 1937 as a result of the shortening of the name of the "United Provinces of Agra and Oudh". It corresponded approximately to the combined regions of the present-day Indian states of Uttar Pradesh and Uttarakhand.

=== Provincial autonomy ===
The Government of India Act 1935 enlarged the elected provincial legislature and expanded provincial autonomy vis-a-vis the central government.

In the elections held in 1937, the Indian National Congress won the majority seats, but declined to form a government. Therefore, on 1 April 1937, the Nawab of Chhatari, the leader of the National Agriculturist Parties, was invited to form a minority provisional government. Only 35 members were present in the Assembly, as others kept away in protest against the new constitution. On 2 April, Chhatari formed the ministry.

Minister	Portfolio
Nawab of Chhatari	Home Affairs
Sir Muhammad Yusuf	Local Self-Government and Health
Jwala Prasad Srivastava	Finance
Raja Syed Ahmad Alvi of Salempur	Education
Raja Maheshwar Dayal Seth	Home and Agricultural
Maharajkumar of Vizianagram	Justice
Raja Durga Narayan Singh of Tirwa	Industries and Communications

Apart from the cabinet ministers, there were ten parliamentary secretaries attached to them, who included Venkatesh Narayan Tivary, Ajit Prasad Jain, Atmaram Govind Kher, and Acharya Jugal Kishore.

The Congress reversed its decision and resolved to accept office in July 1937. Therefore, the Governor Sir Harry Graham Haig invited Govind Ballabh Pant to form the government. The Pant ministry was sworn in on 17 July, 1937.

Minister	Portfolio
Govind Ballabh Pant	Premier, Home, Finance, General Administration and Forests
Rafi Ahmed Kidwai	Revenue and Jails
Kailash Nath Katju	Justice, Development, Agriculture and Veterinary, and Industries
Vijaya Lakshmi Pandit	Local Self-government, Medical and Public Health
Muhammad Ibrahim	Communications (PWD and Irrigation)
Pyarelal Sharma (1937-1938)	Education
Sampurnanand (1938-1939)	Education

On 1 August 1937, Purushottam Das Tandon was elected as the Speaker of the Legislative Council.

In 1939, all of the Congress ministries in British Indian provinces resigned and the United Provinces were placed under the Governor's rule. In 1945, the British Labour government ordered new elections to the Provincial legislatures. The Congress won a majority in the 1946 elections in the United Provinces and Pant was again the Premier, continuing even after India's independence in 1947.

=== Post-independence ===
Following independence in 1947, the princely states of Rampur, Baiswada, Banares, Samthar, Dhurwai, Charkhari, Beri and Tehri-Garwal were merged into the United Provinces. On 24 January 1950, this unit was renamed as Uttar Pradesh. In 2000, the separate state of Uttaranchal, now known as Uttarakhand, was carved out of Uttar Pradesh.

== See also ==
- Presidencies and provinces of British India
