= Dehradun Assembly constituency =

Former constituency of the Uttarakhand Legislative Assembly, in India

Coordinates: 30.32°N 78.03°E

Dehradun
- Former constituency for the Uttarakhand Legislative Assembly

Constituency details
- Country: India
- Region: North India
- State: Uttarakhand
- District: Dehradun
- Established: 1951
- Abolished: 2012

Dehradun Legislative Assembly constituency was a part of the Uttar Pradesh Legislative Assembly from 1951 to 2000. It became a part of the Interim Uttaranchal Assembly from 2000 to 2002 and of the Uttarakhand Legislative Assembly from 2002 to 2012. It was abolished in 2012 following the delimitation.

== Members of Legislative Assembly ==
INC Independent ABJS JP BJP

Election	Winner	Party	Runner up	Party	Margin
1951	Shanti Prapanna Sharma	Indian National Congress	Gulab Singh	Independent	3,388
1957	Brij Bhushan Saran	Indian National Congress	Durga Prasad	Independent	4,575
1962	Brij Bhushan Saran	Indian National Congress	Ram Swarup	Independent	282
1967	Ram Swarup	Independent	Nityanand Swami	Bharatiya Jana Sangh	2,017
1969	Nityanand Swami	Bharatiya Jana Sangh	Krishan Chand Singhal	Indian National Congress	3,164
1974	Bhola Dutt Saklani	Indian National Congress	Nityanand Swami	Bharatiya Jana Sangh	11,570
1977	Devendra Dutt Shastri	Janata Party	Bhola Dutt Saklani	Indian National Congress	1,278
1980	Dwarika Nath Dhawan	Indian National Congress	Nityanand Swami	Independent	19,086
1985	Hira Singh Bisht	Indian National Congress	Harbans Kapoor	Bharatiya Janata Party	29,390
1989	Harbans Kapoor	Bharatiya Janata Party	Hira Singh Bisht	Indian National Congress	10,182
1991	Harbans Kapoor	Bharatiya Janata Party	Vinod Chandola	Indian National Congress	21,267
1993	Harbans Kapoor	Bharatiya Janata Party	Dinesh Agrawal	Indian National Congress	14,354
1996	Harbans Kapoor	Bharatiya Janata Party	Dinesh Agrawal	Indian National Congress	40,733
Major boundary changes
2002	Harbans Kapoor	Bharatiya Janata Party	Sanjay Sharma	Indian National Congress	2,924
2007	Harbans Kapoor	Bharatiya Janata Party	Lalchand Sharma	Indian National Congress	7,033

== Election results ==
=== Assembly Election 2007 ===
2007 Uttarakhand Legislative Assembly election: Dehradun
Party	Candidate	Votes	%	±%
BJP	Harbans Kapoor	23,856	50.61%	▲9.50
INC	Lal Chand	16,823	35.69%	▲3.18
UKD	Virendra Uniyal	2,320	4.92%	▲3.35
Shivsena	Amit	1,552	3.29%	▼0.68
BSP	Shiv Kumar Agarwal	587	1.25%	▲0.11
Independent	Gurudip Singh	436	0.92%	New
Independent	Shyam Sunder Yadav	338	0.72%	New
Independent	Pankaj Kukreti	310	0.66%	New
SP	Ritesh Sachdeva	304	0.64%	▲0.03
Margin of victory		7,033	14.92%	▲6.32
Turnout		47,138	57.16%	▲14.87
Registered electors		82,475		▲2.56
BJP hold		Swing	▲9.50	

=== Assembly Election 2002 ===
2002 Uttaranchal Legislative Assembly election: Dehradun
Party	Candidate	Votes	%	±%
BJP	Harbans Kapoor	13,977	41.11%	New
INC	Sanjay Sharma	11,053	32.51%	New
Independent	Anuj Nautiyal	5,848	17.20%	New
Shivsena	Gaurav Kumar	1,352	3.98%	New
UKD	Sarita Gaud	536	1.58%	New
Uttarakhand Janwadi Party	Asha Bahuguna	396	1.16%	New
BSP	Tausif Khan	387	1.14%	New
SP	Nabi Ahmed	209	0.61%	New
Margin of victory		2,924	8.60%	
Turnout		34,003	42.29%	
Registered electors		80,418		
BJP win (new seat)				

=== 1985 results ===
Hira Singh Bisht won election against harbans Kapoor

=== 1969 results ===
1969 Uttar Pradesh Legislative Assembly election: Dehradun
Party	Candidate	Votes	%	±%
ABJS	Nityanand Swami	20,349	35.57	
INC	Krishan Chand Singhal	17,185	30.37	
Independent	Sunil Chandra Datta	15,076	26.65	
PSP	Rajendra Prasad Dobhal	3,210	5.67	
Independent	Ram Chander	335	0.59	
Independent	Girish Chandra Juyal	185	0.33	
Independent	Ram Avtar	157	0.28	
Independent	Irshad Ahmed	81	0.14	
Majority				
Turnout		56,578	62.08	
ABJS gain from Independent		Swing		

=== 1967 results ===
1967 Uttar Pradesh Legislative Assembly election: Dehradun
Party	Candidate	Votes	%	±%
Independent	Ram Swaroop	21,191	38.60	▲10.95
ABJS	Nityanand Swami	19,174	34.93	▲11.69
INC	Brij Bhushan Saran	14,038	25.57	▼2.71
Independent	G.C. Chaurasia	492	0.90	New
Majority		2,017	3.67	▲10.41
Turnout		54,895	65.96	–
Independent gain from INC		Swing		

=== 1962 results ===
1962 Uttar Pradesh Legislative Assembly election: Dehradun
Party	Candidate	Votes	%	±%
INC	Brij Bhushan Saran	12,638	28.28	▼16.07
Independent	Ram Swaroop	12,356	27.65	New
ABJS	Nityanand Swami	9,210	23.24	–
Independent	Sunil Chandra Dutta	6,017	13.46	New
PSP	Sadhu Singh	4,248	9.50	New
Independent	Babu Ram Gupta	144	0.32	New
Independent	B.S. Hudsun	82	0.18	New
Majority		282	0.63	▼14.08
Turnout		44,695	65.96	▲9.57
INC hold		Swing		

=== 1957 results ===
1957 Uttar Pradesh Legislative Assembly election: Dehradun
Party	Candidate	Votes	%	±%
INC	Brij Bhushan Saran	13,793	44.35	New
Independent	Durga Prasad	9,218	29.64	New
ABJS	Nityanand Swami	7,228	23.24	New
Independent	Chandan Singh	859	2.76	New
Majority		4,575	14.71	New
Turnout		31,098	56.39	New
INC win (new seat)				

== See also ==
- Dehradun Cantonment (Uttarakhand Assembly constituency)
