= Keshari Nath Tripathi =

Indian politician (1934–2023)

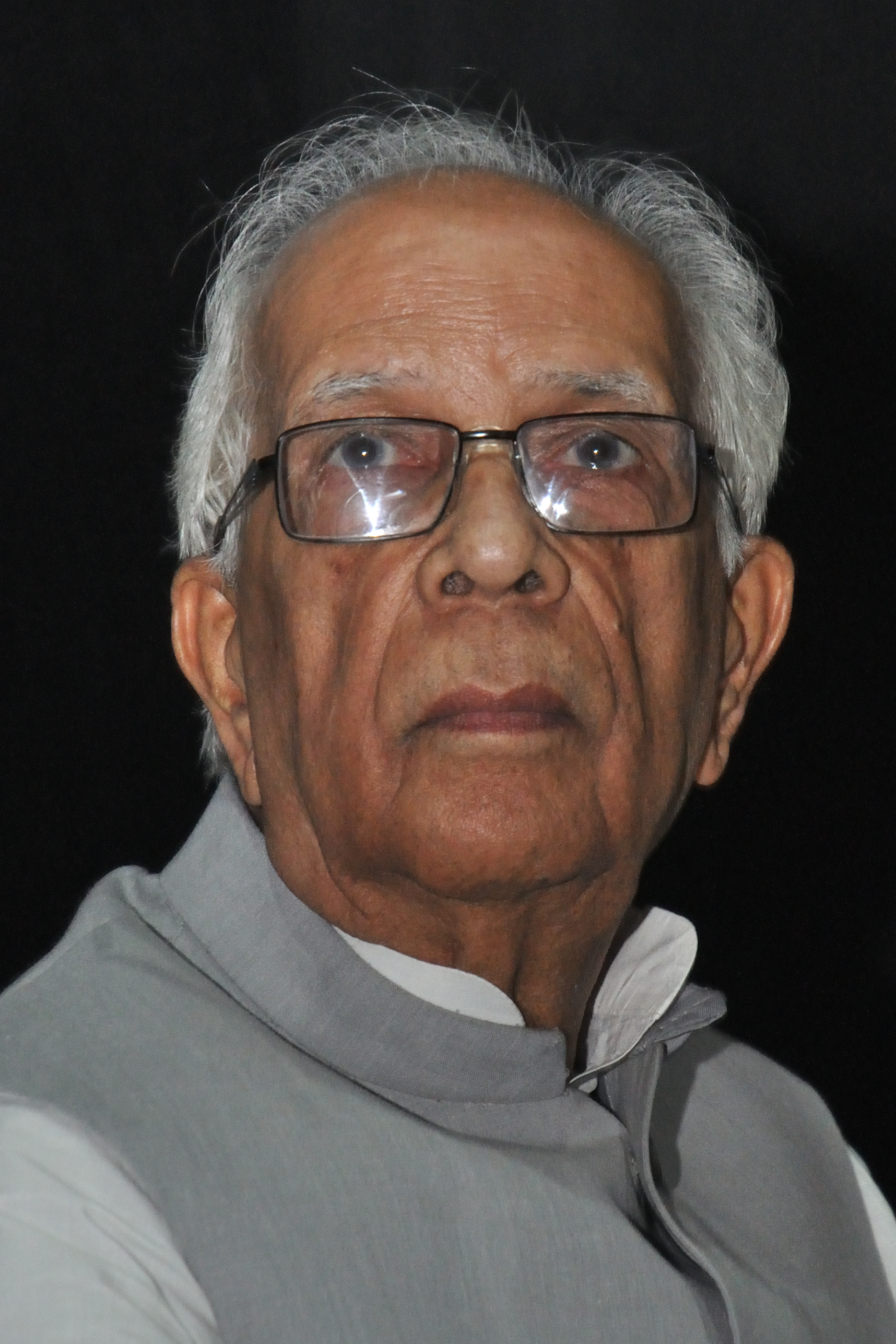
- Tripathi in 2016

19th Governor of West Bengal
- In office 24 July 2014 – 29 July 2019
- Chief Minister: Mamata Banerjee
- Preceded by: D. Y. Patil (additional charge)
- Succeeded by: Jagdeep Dhankhar

Governor of Bihar
- (Additional Charge)
- In office 20 June 2017 – 29 September 2017
- Chief Minister: Nitish Kumar
- Preceded by: Ram Nath Kovind
- Succeeded by: Satya Pal Malik
- In office 27 November 2014 – 15 August 2015
- Chief Minister: Jitan Ram Manjhi; Nitish Kumar
- Preceded by: D. Y. Patil
- Succeeded by: Ram Nath Kovind

Governor of Mizoram
- (Additional Charge)
- In office 4 April 2015 – 25 May 2015
- Chief Minister: Lal Thanhawla
- Preceded by: Aziz Qureshi
- Succeeded by: Nirbhay Sharma

14th Governor of Meghalaya
- (Additional Charge)
- In office 6 January 2015 – 19 May 2015
- Chief Minister: Mukul Sangma
- Preceded by: Krishan Kant Paul
- Succeeded by: V. Shanmuganathan

Speaker of the Uttar Pradesh Legislative Assembly
- In office 30 July 1991–15 December 1993
- Preceded by: Hari Krishna Srivastava
- Succeeded by: Dhaniram Verma
- In office 27 March 1997–19 May 2004
- Preceded by: Barkhu Ram Verma
- Succeeded by: Mata Prasad Pandey

Member of the Uttar Pradesh Legislative Assembly
- In office 1989–2007
- Preceded by: Satish Chandra Jaiswal
- Succeeded by: Nand Gopal Gupta
- Constituency: Allahabad South
- In office 1977–1980
- Preceded by: Vidya Dhar
- Succeeded by: Baij Nath Prasad Kushwaha
- Constituency: Jhusi

Personal details
- Born: 10 November 1934 Allahabad, United Provinces, British India (now Prayagraj, Uttar Pradesh, India)
- Died: 8 January 2023 (aged 88) Prayagraj, Uttar Pradesh, India
- Party: Bharatiya Janata Party

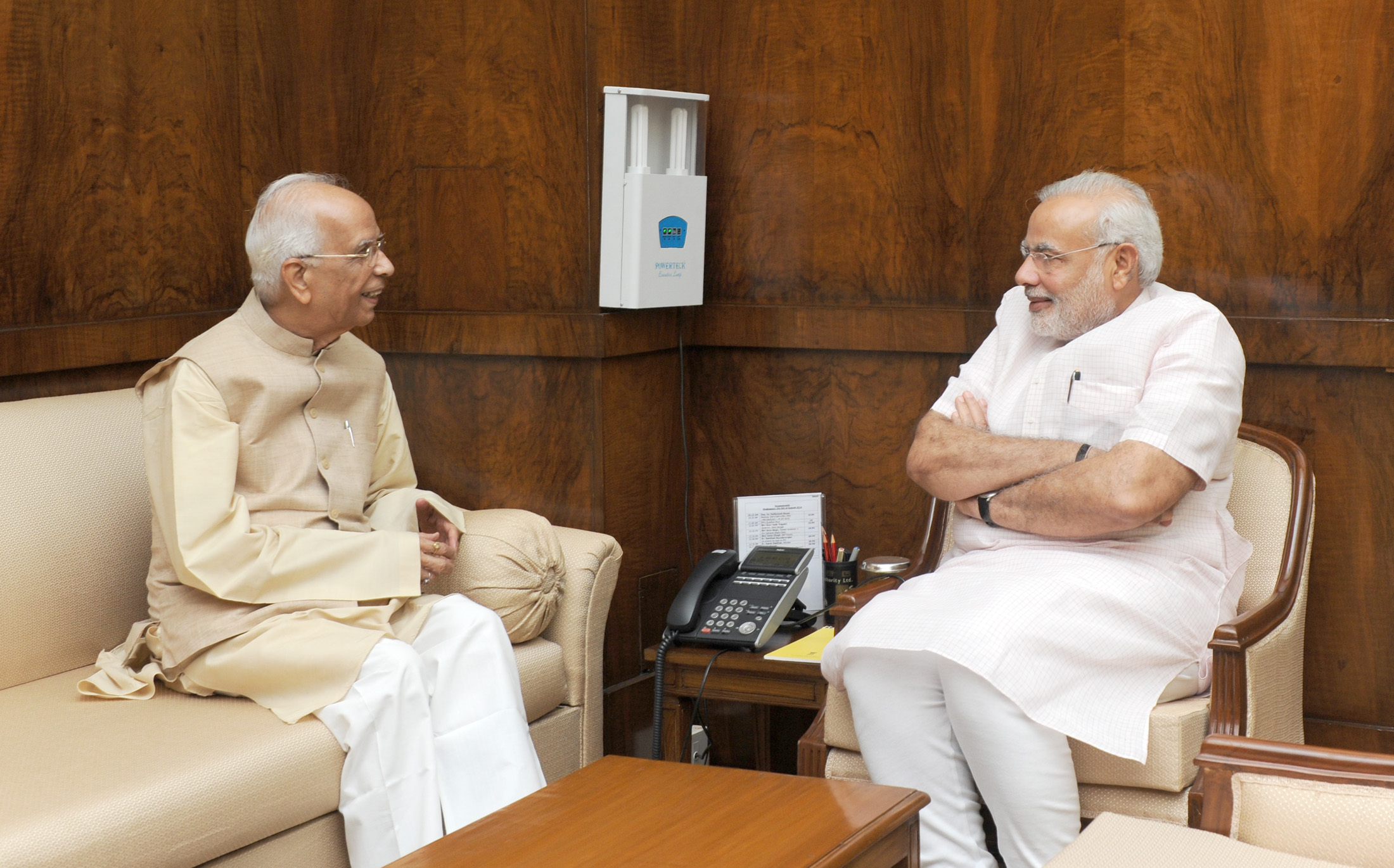
Keshari Nath Tripathi and Narendra Modi

Keshari Nath Tripathi (10 November 1934 – 8 January 2023) was an Indian politician, who served as Governor of West Bengal from July 2014 to July 2019 and also as Governor of Bihar, Meghalaya, and Mizoram at various times. He was a member of Bharatiya Janata Party (BJP). He was the Speaker of Uttar Pradesh legislative assembly three times, and the president of BJP Uttar Pradesh.

Tripathi was a multifaceted personality who excelled in the fields of law, politics and literature. His legal and political career spanned more than five decades during which he contributed to the fields of law, administration, literature and public good.

== Personal life ==
Tripathi was born on 10 November 1934 to Harish Chandra Tripathi and Shiva Devi at Allahabad, Uttar Pradesh. He was youngest of three brothers and four sisters. His eldest brother Kashi Nath Tripathi was also a member of Jansangh and was an advocate of the District Court. He guided and mentored Tripathi in his legal and political journey. Tripathi also received a lot of encouragement and support from his elder brother Kailash Nath Tripathi who always stood by his side in all his political endeavours.

He married Sudha Tripathi in 1958. She was the daughter of Pt Satya Narain Mishra of Varanasi who was a Freedom Fighter. He has one son and two daughters: Neeraj Tripathi, Ms. Namita Tripathi and Nidhi Ojha.

His son Neeraj Tripathi has been nominated as the BJP candidate from Prayagraj for the forthcoming Lok Sabha elections. His daughter-in law, Kavita Yadav Tripathi is also a member of BJP and is Pradesh mantri in BJP Mahila Morcha in UP.

His daughter, Nidhi Ojha is a civil servant presently posted in a central ministry. His son-in-law Col. Manish Ojha (retd.) served in the Indian Army for thirty plus years.

His granddaughter Ms Shivangi Tripathi is a practicing lawyer at the High Court of Allahabad.

== Education ==
Tripathi had a modest schooling in his initial years at the Central Hindu School and the Saryupareen School till Class 8 after which he joined the Agarwal Inter College and completed his High School (1949) and Intermediate (1951) from there. He did his graduation (1953) and Bachelor in Law from the University of Allahabad in the year 1955.

== Legal career ==
Tripathi joined the Bar at Allahabad High Court in 1956 at the age of 22 and had a career spanning more than five decades. He began his practice in the chamber of Babu Jagdish Swarup, a renowned lawyer and former Solicitor General of India. Under the guidance of his esteemed senior, Tripathi gradually shaped his career by sheer hard work, diligence and dedication. He went on to become the President of the Allahabad High Court Bar Association in 1987-89 and was declared senior advocate by a full court reference in 1989. As a lawyer, he was an expert in constitutional and electoral law apart from civil matters and represented both common citizens as well as renowned leaders before the courts of law.

Being an expert on Election Law, Tripathi wrote a commentary on the Representation of People’s Act, 1951 that was used as a reference material by lawyers for a long time. Tripathi had the distinction of appearing for Prime Ministers like Chaudhary Charan Singh and Atal Bihari Vajpayee and also for leaders like Raj Narain, Hemvati Nandan Bahuguna, Mahabir Prasad, Kalyan Singh, Laxmikant Bajpai, Nityanand Swami etc.

== Political career ==
Drawn towards public service and social causes from a young age, Keshari Nath Tripathi joined the Rashtriya Swayamsevak Sangh as a Swayamsevak at the age of 12 in 1946. He joined the Bharatiya Janasangh in 1952 soon after its inception and courted arrest in the year 1953 while participating in the Kashmir Andolan led by Dr Shyama Prasad Mukherjee and was jailed.

Keshari Nath Tripathi started his political career as a booth level worker of the Bharatiya Janasangh and worked assiduously for establishing the organizational structure of the party at grassroots level by conducting door to door campaigns. He won his first assembly election from Jhunsi, Allahabad in 1977 and served as a Cabinet Minister for Sales Tax and Institutional Finance during the Janata Party Government in UP.

Tripathi joined the Bharatiya Janata Party on its formation in 1980. He was the BJP Mahanagar Adhyaksh from 1980 to 1986 and worked diligently towards building the party and consolidating its base. Later, Tripathi was elected to the state assembly five times in 1989, 1991, 1993, 1996 and 2002.

He was also elected unanimously as Speaker of the UP Vidha Sabha three times, first in 1999, then in 1997 and later in 2002. He possessed deep knowledge about parliamentary rules, procedures and law and was appointed by Speaker Lok Sabha as Member of the Committee for maintaining cordial relations between the Legislature and Judiciary. Keshari Nath Tripathi was the President of the UP Branch of the Commonwealth Parliamentary Union for about nine years. During his stints as MLA and Speaker of the UP assembly, Tripathi continuously strove towards the welfare of people.

Triveni Pushp, built on the banks of river Yamuna in 2003 at Prayagraj was his dream project and is a tourist attraction in Prayagraj.

Keshari Nath Tripathi was also the Pradesh Adhyaksh of BJP State Unit in Uttar Pradesh from 2004 till 2007. He was an active leader who was admired across the rank and file of the party and gave importance to every party worker during his stint as state president.

Tripathi took oath as the Governor of West Bengal on 24 July 2014. He was given additional charge of the Governor of Bihar on 27 November 2014, Governor of Meghalaya on January 6, 2015 and Governor of Mizoram on 4 April 2015.

== Other works ==
Keshari Nath Tripathi was also a poet and worked towards promotion of Hindi Language and literature both within the country and abroad. His poetry was widely acclaimed and he participated in various poetry symposiums both in India and abroad. Seven compendiums of his Hindi poems have been published under the titles Manonukriti, Aayu Pamkh, Chirantan, Unmukta, Maun aur Shunya, Nirmal Dohe and Shabd Bhramar. Manunukriti has also been translated into English as The Images. A translation of his Hindi poems into Bengali has been published as Kavyabithika and a comprehensive collection has been published as Sanchayita. Tripathi participated in various poetry symposiums in the UK, USA and the Netherlands besides India with the objective of promoting Hindi language. He was honoured with a number of awards for his contribution to public affairs and literature. Chief among the honours received are the Bharat Gaourav Samman, Vishwa Bharati Samman, Sahitya Vachaspati Samman, Acharya Mahavir Prasad Dwivedi Samman etc.

Political offices
Preceded by D. Y. Patil; Additional Charge	Governor of West Bengal; July 2014 – 29 July 2019	Succeeded by Jagdeep Dhankhar
Preceded by Krishan Kant Paul	Governor of Meghalaya; January 2015 – May 2015	Succeeded by V. Shanmuganathan
Preceded by D. Y. Patil	Governor of Bihar; November 2014 – August 2015	Succeeded by Ram Nath Kovind
Preceded by Ram Nath Kovind	Governor of Bihar; June 2017 – October 2017	Succeeded by Satya Pal Malik
