= Garautha Assembly constituency =

Constituency of the Uttar Pradesh legislative assembly in India

Coordinates: 25.57°N 79.30°E

Garautha
- Constituency No. 225 for the Uttar Pradesh Legislative Assembly

Constituency details
- Country: India
- Region: North India
- State: Uttar Pradesh
- District: Jhansi
- Total electors: 3,52,776 (2022)
- Reservation: None

Member of Legislative Assembly
- 18th Uttar Pradesh Legislative Assembly
- Incumbent Jawahar Lal Rajput
- Party: Bharatiya Janta Party
- Elected year: 2022

Garautha is a constituency of the Uttar Pradesh Legislative Assembly covering the city of Garautha in the Jhansi district of Uttar Pradesh, India.

Garautha is one of five assembly constituencies in the Jalaun Lok Sabha constituency. Since 2008, this assembly constituency is numbered 225 amongst 403 constituencies.

Currently this seat belongs to Bharatiya Janta Party candidate Jawahar Lal Rajpoot who won in last Assembly election of 2022 Uttar Pradesh Legislative Elections defeating Samajwadi Party candidate Deep Narayan Singh (Deepak Yadav) by a margin of 33,662 votes.

== Members of Legislative Assembly ==
Year	Member	Party
1957	Lachman Rao Kadam	Indian National Congress
1962	Kashi Prasad Dwivedi	Indian National Congress
1967	Kanhaiya Lal	Bharatiya Jana Sangh
1969	Atmaram Govind Kher	Indian National Congress
1974	Ranjeet Singh Judeo	Indian National Congress
1977	Ranjeet Singh Judeo	Indian National Congress
1980	Ranjeet Singh Judeo	Indian National Congress
1985	Kunwar Manvendra Singh	Bharatiya Janata Party
1989	Ranjeet Singh Judeo	Indian National Congress
1991	Ranjeet Singh Judeo	Indian National Congress
1993	Ranjeet Singh Judeo	Indian National Congress
1996	Chandrapal Yadav	Samajwadi Party
2002	Brijendra Kumar Vyas	Bahujan Samaj Party
2007	Deep Narayan Yadav	Samajwadi Party
2012	Deep Narayan Yadav	Samajwadi Party
2017	Jawahar Lal Rajput	Bharatiya Janata Party
2022	Jawahar Lal Rajput	Bharatiya Janata Party

== Election results ==
=== 2027 ===
2027 Uttar Pradesh Legislative Assembly election: Garautha
Party	Candidate	Votes	%	±%
INDIA				
NDA				
BSP				
NOTA	None of the above			
Majority				
Turnout				
gain from		Swing		

=== 2022 ===
2022 Uttar Pradesh Legislative Assembly election: Garautha
Party	Candidate	Votes	%	±%
BJP	Jawahar Lal Rajput	114,059	48.34	+7.53
SP	Deep Narayan Singh	80,397	34.07	+0.18
BSP	Bira Singh	29,333	12.43	−8.72
INC	Neha	3,303	1.4	
NOTA	None of the above	2,767	1.17	+0.0
Majority		33,662	14.27	+7.35
Turnout		235,972	67.06	−0.49
BJP hold		Swing		

=== 2017 ===
2017 Uttar Pradesh Legislative Assembly election: Garautha
Party	Candidate	Votes	%	±%
BJP	Jawahar Lal Rajput	93,378	40.81	
SP	Deep Narayan Singh	77,547	33.89	
BSP	Dr. Arun Kumar Mishra	48,387	21.15	
NOTA	None of the above	2,645	1.17	
Majority		15,831	6.92	
Turnout		228,787	67.55	
