= Ram Prasad Nautiyal =

- राम प्रसाद नौटियाल

Indian Freedom Fighter and Member of Legislative Assembly
- In office 1951–1962

Personal details
- Born: 1 August 1905 Kanda Khatli, Beironkhal Pauri Garhwal (United Provinces, British India), India
- Died: 24 December 1980 (aged 75) Lucknow
- Parent(s): Gauri Datta Nautiyal and Devaki Devi Nautiyal
- Nickname: Kaptaan (captain) Nautiyal

Ram Prasad Nautiyal (Hindi: राम प्रसाद नौटियाल) (1 August 1905 – 24 December 1980) was an Indian independence activist and politician from Uttrakhand.
