= Dhaniram Verma =

Indian politician

Leader of the Opposition Uttar Pradesh Legislative Assembly
- In office 21 April 1997 – 15 September 2001
- Chief Minister: Mayawati; Kalyan Singh; Ram Prakash Gupta; Rajnath Singh
- Preceded by: Mulayam Singh Yadav
- Succeeded by: Swami Prasad Maurya

Speaker of the Uttar Pradesh Legislative Assembly
- In office 15 December 1993 – 20 June 1995
- Chief Minister: Mulayam Singh Yadav; Mayawati
- Preceded by: Keshari Nath Tripathi
- Succeeded by: Barkhuram Verma

Member of Uttar Pradesh Legislative Assembly
- In office 2007–2009
- Preceded by: Vinay Shakya
- Succeeded by: Mahesh Chandra Verma
- Constituency: Bidhuna
- In office 1989–2002
- Preceded by: Ausan Singh
- Succeeded by: Vinay Shakya
- Constituency: Bidhuna
- In office 1980–1985
- Preceded by: Bharat Singh Chauhan
- Succeeded by: Kamlesh Pathak
- Constituency: Auraiya

Personal details
- Born: 7 October 1930 Purwasujan, United Provinces, British India
- Died: 12 December 2012 (aged 82) Lucknow, Uttar Pradesh, India
- Party: Bahujan Samaj Party (2008-12)
- Other political affiliations: Samajwadi Party (till 2008)
- Spouse: Smt. Ram Devi (m. 1946–2012)
- Children: 4 sons & 3 daughters
- Parent: Ram Prasad Verma (father)
- Education: M.A.

Dhaniram Verma was an Indian politician from Samajwadi Party who served as the 13th Speaker of the Uttar Pradesh Legislative Assembly from 1993 to 1995. He also served as the Leader of the Opposition in the Uttar Pradesh Legislative Assembly from 1997 to 2001.
