= Purushottam Das Tandon =

Indian freedom fighter

Rajarshi Purushottam Das Tandon
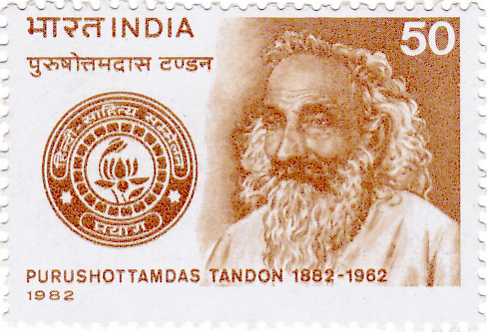
- Born: 1 August 1882; Allahabad, North-Western Provinces, British India (Present-day Prayagraj, Uttar Pradesh, India)
- Died: 1 July 1962 (aged 79)
- Occupation: Politician
- Political party: Indian National Congress
- Awards: Bharat Ratna (1961)

Purushottam Das Tandon (1 August 1882 – 1 July 1962) was a freedom fighter from Allahabad, Uttar Pradesh, India. He is widely remembered for his opposition to the partition of India, as well as efforts in achieving the Official Language of India status for Hindi. He was customarily given the title Rajarshi (etymology: Raja + Rishi = Royal Saint). He was popularly known as UP's Gandhi. He was awarded the Bharat Ratna, India's highest civilian award, in 1961.

== Early life ==
Purushottam Das Tandon was born in Allahabad in a middle class Khatri family. After obtaining a degree in law and an MA in history, he started practicing in 1906 and joined the bar of Allahabad High Court in 1908 as a junior to Tej Bahadur Sapru. He gave up practice in 1921 to concentrate on public activities. He also worked as a professor of Hindi at Victoria College, Gwalior.

== Freedom struggle ==
He was a member of Indian National Congress since his student days in 1899. In 1906, he represented Allahabad in the All India Congress Committee (AICC). He was associated with the Congress Party committee that studied the Jallianwala Bagh incident in 1919. In the 1920s and 1930s, he was arrested for participating in the non-cooperation movement and Salt Satyagraha respectively. He and Jawaharlal Nehru were among the people arrested even before Mohandas K. Gandhi returned from the Round Table Conference at London in 1931. He was known for his efforts in farmers' movements and he served as the President of Bihar Provincial Kisan Sabha in 1934. He also remained President of Servants of the People Society (Hindi _{(ISO)}: Lōka Sēvaka Maṇḍala ), a social service organisation founded by Lala Lajpat Rai, in 1921.

He worked as the Speaker of the Legislative Assembly of the present-day Uttar Pradesh for a period of 13 years, from 31 July 1937 to 10 August 1950. He was elected to the Constituent Assembly of India in 1946.

== After independence ==
He established the Hindu Rakshak Dal in 1947. He tried for the position of the President of the Congress Party unsuccessfully against Pattabhi Sitaramayya in 1948 but contested successfully against Acharya Kriplani in the controversial and difficult 1950 election to head the Nagpur session. He soon resigned from Congress's president post because of differences with Nehru and as Nehru's popularity was needed for winning elections. Nehru, while being the Prime Minister of independent India, also became the president of Congress for 1951 and 1952. He was elected to the Lok Sabha in 1952 and the Rajya Sabha in 1956. He retired from active public life after that due to indifferent health. He was awarded the Bharat Ratna, India's highest civilian award in 1961.

== Controversies ==
=== Religious tolerance ===
Several controversies and contradictions abound in the life of Purushottam Das Tandon. While he emphasised the similarities between Hindu and Muslim cultures, he is regarded to have carried the image of a soft Hindu nationalist leader. He was not as successful as Gandhi in summoning religious ideals to aspects of Public Service despite being associated with the moderate Radha Soami sect. He and KM Munshi were among those who strongly opposed religious propagation and conversion of a people of one religion to another; they strongly argued in the constituent assembly for a condemnation in the constitution of religious conversion.

=== Opposition to the partition of India ===
On 12 June 1947, the Congress Working Committee met and passed a resolution accepting the partition of India. When the same had to be ratified on 14 June by the AICC, one of the dissenting voices came from Tandon. On that occasion, he said, "Acceptance of the resolution will be an abject surrender to the British and the Muslim League. The admission of the Working Committee was an admission of weakness and the result of a sense of despair. The Partition would not benefit either community – the Hindus in Pakistan and the Muslims in India would both live in fear." Thus, he was strongly opposed to the partition of India.

=== Advocacy for Hindi ===
Despite Gandhi and other leaders advocating the adoption of Hindustani, a mixture of Hindi and Urdu, as the national language, he insisted on the usage of Devanagari script and the rejection of the Urdu script as well as words with Arabic-Persian roots. This led to him being called a political reactionary by Nehru. His attitude towards the Sanskritisation or making the language more formal was also controversial. His insistence on the usage of numerals of Devanagari script over the international system and his debates in the constituent assembly on adoption of Hindi as the official language irked Dravidian leaders.

== Publications ==
He wrote a biography of Jawaharlal Nehru, titled The Unforgettable Nehru, which was published by the National Book Trust India. A collection of his essays were compiled and published under the name, Ṭaṇḍana nibandhāvali.

== Anecdotes ==
- A Speaker is supposed to be impartial and hence, speakers generally do not participate in their party meetings. Tandon, however, used to participate actively in his party meetings, as he was clear in his conscience that since he could separate these into different compartments, there should not be any issue. When he was questioned on this stand on the floor of the house, he offered to step down if any of the members of the house lacked confidence in him. No member pressed the issue.
- As a staunch believer in ahimsa, he started using rubber chappals to avoid usage of leather.
- Rajarshi Purushottam Das Tandon was at the time a member of parliament. Once, when he went to collect his salary cheque in the Parliament Office, he asked the clerk there to transfer the amount directly to a "Public Service Fund". The officials over there were pleasantly surprised by his generosity. One of his colleagues standing nearby said: "There are hardly four hundred rupees as your allowance for the whole month. And you are donating the entire amount for social service?" Tandon ji humbly replied – "You see, I have seven sons and all are earning sufficiently to raise their families; each one sends me one hundred rupees per month. I spend only about rupees three to four hundred from that and the rest goes to some philanthropic causes. This allowance as a Member-of-Parliament is again extra for some one like me. Why should I save it for myself or my family? It was because of this natural austerity and detachment from selfish possessions that he was called a "Rajarishi".
- He was fondly called Rajarshi by Mahatma Gandhi.
