= Atmaram Govind Kher =

Indian politician (1894–1982)

Atmaram Govind Kher was an Indian politician, who served as a speaker of the 1st Uttar Pradesh Assembly, 2nd Uttar Pradesh Legislative Assembly and 5th Uttar Pradesh Assembly. He is three times speaker in the assembly.

== Personal life ==
He was born on 25 September 1894 in Gursarai, Jhansi and married Shantabai Kher on 9 June 1916. On 4 January 1982, he died.
