= Unnao Lok Sabha constituency =

Lok Sabha constituency in Uttar Pradesh

Coordinates: 26.59°N 80.52°E

Unnao UP-35
- Lok Sabha constituency
- Interactive Map Outlining Unnao Lok Sabha constituency

Constituency details
- Country: India
- Region: North India
- State: Uttar Pradesh
- Assembly constituencies: Bangarmau; Safipur; Mohan; Unnao; Bhagwantnagar; Purwa
- Established: 1952
- Reservation: None

Member of Parliament
- 18th Lok Sabha
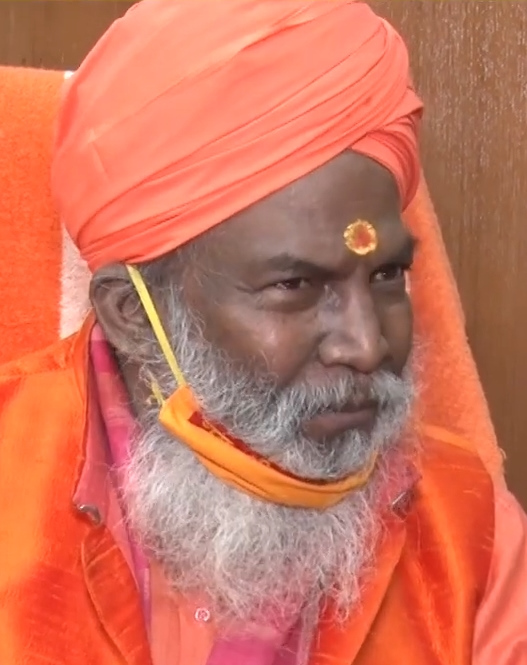
- Incumbent Sakshi Maharaj
- Party: Bharatiya Janata Party
- Elected year: 2024

Unnao Lok Sabha constituency is one of the 80 Lok Sabha (parliamentary) constituencies in Uttar Pradesh state in northern India.

== Assembly segments ==
From 2009, Unnao Lok Sabha constituency comprised the following assembly segments:

No	Name	District	Member	Party	2024 Lead
162	Bangarmau	Unnao	Shrikant Katiyar	BJP	SP
163	Safipur (SC)	Unnao	Bamba Lal Diwakar	BJP	BJP
164	Mohan (SC)	Unnao	Brijesh Rawat	BJP	BJP
165	Unnao	Unnao	Pankaj Gupta	BJP	BJP
166	Bhagwantnagar	Unnao	Ashutosh Shukla	BJP	BJP
167	Purwa	Unnao	Anil Singh	BJP	BJP

== Members of Parliament ==
Year	Member	Party
1952	Vishwambhar Dayal Tripathi	Indian National Congress
1957	Vishwambhar Dayal Tripathi	Indian National Congress
1960^	Lila Dhar Asthana	Indian National Congress
1962	Krishna Dev Tripathi	Indian National Congress
1967	Krishna Dev Tripathi	Indian National Congress
1971	Ziaur Rahman Ansari	Indian National Congress
1977	Raghavendra Singh	Janata Party
1980	Ziaur Rahman Ansari	Indian National Congress
1984	Ziaur Rahman Ansari	Indian National Congress
1989	Anwar Ahmad	Janata Dal
1991	Devi Bux Singh	Bharatiya Janata Party
1996	Devi Bux Singh	Bharatiya Janata Party
1998	Devi Bux Singh	Bharatiya Janata Party
1999	Deepak Kumar	Samajwadi Party
2004	Brajesh Pathak	Bahujan Samaj Party
2009	Annu Tandon	Indian National Congress
2014	Sakshi Maharaj	Bharatiya Janata Party
2019	Sakshi Maharaj	Bharatiya Janata Party
2024	Sakshi Maharaj	Bharatiya Janata Party

^ by poll

== Election results ==
=== General Election 2024 ===
2024 Indian general election: Unnao
Party	Candidate	Votes	%	±%
BJP	Sakshi Maharaj	616,133	47.31	▼9.56
SP	Annu Tandon	5,80,315	44.56	▲20.10
BSP	Ashok Kumar Pandey	72,527	5.57	▲5.57
NOTA	None of the Above	9,453	0.73	▼0.17
Majority		35,818	2.75	▼29.66
Turnout		13,02,271	56.61	▲0.14
BJP hold		Swing		

=== 2019 ===
2019 Indian general elections: Unnao
Party	Candidate	Votes	%	±%
BJP	Sakshi Maharaj	703,507	56.87	+13.69
SP	Arun Shankar Shukla	3,02,551	24.46	+7.09
INC	Annu Tandon	1,85,634	15.01	−1.39
Nagrik Ekta Party	Umar Khan	11,123	0.90	+0.90
PSP(L)	Satish Shukla	6,711	0.54	+0.54
NOTA	None of the Above	11,190	0.90	+0.52
Majority		4,00,956	32.41	+6.60
Turnout		12,37,551	56.47	+0.94
BJP hold		Swing	+13.69	

=== 2014 results ===
2014 Indian general elections: Unnao
Party	Candidate	Votes	%	±%
BJP	Sakshi Maharaj	518,834	43.18	+37.53
SP	Arun Shankar Shukla	2,08,661	17.37	+1.32
BSP	Brajesh Pathak	2,00,176	16.66	−2.51
INC	Annu Tandon	1,97,098	16.40	−36.17
IND.	Anil Kumar Chaudhary	9,618	0.80	+0.80
IND.	Rameshwar	9,277	0.77	+0.77
NOTA	None of the Above	4,626	0.38	+0.38
Majority		3,10,173	25.81	−7.59
Turnout		12,01,806	55.53	+5.80
BJP gain from INC		Swing	-9.39	

=== 2009 results ===
2009 Indian general elections: Unnao
Party	Candidate	Votes	%	±%
INC	Annu Tandon	475,476	52.57	
BSP	Arun Shankar Shukla	1,73,384	19.17	
SP	Deepak Kumar	1,45,139	16.05	
BJP	Ramesh Kumar Singh	51,102	5.65	
Independent	Chandra Shekhar Tiwari	16,305	1.80	
Independent	Abhichhedilal Yadav	7,585	0.84	
Independent	Krishnapal Singh Vaishya	4,016	0.44	
NCP	Raj Kishore Singh	3,473	0.38	
Independent	Ashok Kumar	2,260	0.35	
Majority		3,02,092	33.40	
Turnout		9,04,542	49.73	
INC gain from BSP		Swing		

=== 2004 results ===
2004 Indian general elections: Unnao
Party	Candidate	Votes	%	±%
BSP	Brajesh Pathak	178,366	32.57	
SP	Deepak Kumar	1,60,605	29.33	
BJP	Devi Bux Singh	94,711	17.30	
INC	Shiv Pal Singh	83,473	15.24	
AD(K)	Sandhya Kushwaha	7,072	1.29	
Majority		17,761	3.24	
Turnout		5,47,566	42.02	
BSP gain from SP		Swing		

== See also ==
- Annu Tandon
- Unnao district
- List of constituencies of the Lok Sabha
