= Deepak Kumar (politician) =

Indian politicians

Member of Uttar Pradesh Legislative Assembly
- In office March 2012 – March 2017
- Succeeded by: Pankaj Gupta
- Constituency: Unnao

Member of Parliament, Lok Sabha
- In office 1999–2004
- Preceded by: Devi Bux Singh
- Succeeded by: Brajesh Pathak
- Constituency: Unnao

Personal details
- Born: 10 April 1966 (age 60) Wazidpur, Jajmau (Kanpur)
- Relations: Manohar Lal (Father)
- Children: 2 Sons and 1 daughter
- Occupation: Politician

Deepak Kumar is an Indian politician member of the 1985 Uttar Pradesh Legislative Assembly election and 1980 Uttar Pradesh Legislative Assembly election and Cabinet minister in Indian National Congress. He was born on 10 April 1966 in Jajmau.
