= Raghavendra Singh =

Indian politician (1933–1996)

Member of Parliament, Lok Sabha
- In office 1977–1980
- Preceded by: Ziaur Rahman Ansari
- Succeeded by: Ziaur Rahman Ansari
- Constituency: Unnao

Personal details
- Born: 1933
- Died: 5 June 1996 (aged 63) Unnao, Uttar Pradesh, India
- Party: Janata Party

Raghavendra Singh (1933 – 5 June 1996) was an Indian politician. He was elected to the Lok Sabha, the lower house of the Parliament of India from the Unnao constituency of Uttar Pradesh as a member of the Janata Party. Singh died in Unnao on 5 June 1996, at the age of 63.
