= Gangaghat =

Gangaghat Shuklaganj
- city
- Location in Uttar Pradesh, India Gangaghat (India)
- Coordinates: 26°29′58″N 80°24′10″E
- Country: India
- State: Uttar Pradesh
- District: Unnao
- Established: 1935
- Named after: AN Shukla

Government
  - Type: Municipality
  - Body: Gangaghat Municipal Committee

Population (2011)
  - Total: 1,200,000

Languages
  - Official: Hindi
- Time zone: UTC+5:30 (IST)
- PIN: 209861
- Vehicle registration: UP-35
- Nearest city: Kanpur
- Literacy: 80%
- Lok Sabha constituency: Unnao
- Vidhan Sabha constituency: Unnao
- Website: up.gov.in

Gangaghat is a city and a municipal board in Unnao district in the state of Uttar Pradesh, India. It is also known as Shuklaganj and is located on the banks of the Ganges about 5 km from Kanpur on the SH 58. The population was 70803 as of the 2001 census. According to the census of 2011 the population is 84,072. The literacy rate is 91%. It lies in Unnao district and is a suburb of Kanpur.

== Demographics ==
As per 2025 Gangaghat had a population of 131,290. As per 2011 census, Males constitute 53% of the population and females 47%. Gangaghat has an average literacy rate of 78.91%, higher than the national average of 59.5%: male literacy is 71%, and female literacy is 60%. In Gangaghat, 14% of the population is under 6 years of age.

== Transport ==
Shuklaganj has a railway station named Kanpur Bridge Left Bank on the Kanpur-Lucknow line. This station is a two platform railway station and is built for local trains and Memo trains as a proper listed stoppage. Recently a E- bus by the government is also a considerable transport for short distance

== Medical condition ==
It has a Government hospital with many small clinics and women care hospitals and nursing home.

== Pollution and health risks ==
- Water Contamination: Groundwater in the region has been reported to contain contaminants, including heavy metals like Manganese and Cadmium, largely due to industrial effluents from the tanning industry in nearby areas.
- Respiratory Illnesses: Air pollution, often elevated in the region, is linked to an increased risk of respiratory problems, including asthma, bronchitis, and Chronic Obstructive Pulmonary Disease (COPD).
- General Health Concerns: Common reported issues requiring medical attention include diabetes, hypertension, cardiovascular diseases, and anemia.

Health Patterns

- Male Health Profile: Risks often associated with environmental exposure, such as occupational hazards, respiratory ailments, and high blood pressure, leading to cardiovascular issues.
- Female Health Profile: Higher susceptibility to reproductive tract infections, hormonal imbalances (e.g., PCOS), and thyroid issues.
- Diagnostic Demand: Diagnostic centers in the area frequently report high demand for full-body checkups, iron/ferritin tests, and renal function tests, indicating high prevalence of nutritional and lifestyle-related deficiencies.
