= Jajmau =

Jajmau Jajesmow
- sub-metropolis
- Nickname: Leather Cluster of Kanpur
- Location in Uttar Pradesh, India
- Coordinates: 26.46°N 80.35°E
- Country: India
- State: Uttar Pradesh
- District: Kanpur District

Population (2011)
  - Total: 652,831 and 1,600,000 (2,050 estimated)

Languages
  - Official: Hindi, Bengali, Urdu, Bhojpuri, Malayalam, Punjabi & Kannauji (predominantly)
- Time zone: UTC+5:30 (IST)
- PIN: 208 XXX
- Vehicle registration: UP-78
- Literacy: 80%%
- Lok Sabha constituency: Kanpur, Akbarpur, Unnao
- Vidhan Sabha constituency: Kanpur Cantonment, Maharajpur, Unnao

Jajmau formerly known as Jajesmow during British Era, is a suburb of Kanpur, India. It is situated on the banks of the Ganges River, and is an industrial suburb. It has the population of about 652,831 according to the census of 2011. The area comes under the jurisdiction of Kanpur metropolitan area. Jajmau is famous for its leather productions and tanneries, and has been recognized as one of the oldest sites in Kanpur.

== Name ==
According to Paul Whalley, the name Jājmaū may be related to Sanskrit yajña, meaning "sacrifice", which became Old Hindi jaj. It could have gotten this name because the site was originally given to a priest who performed a sacrifice. The ending -maū could come from Sanskrit maryādā, meaning "shore" or "bank", or it could be a contraction of the name of the mahuā tree.

== Geography ==
The city's coordinates are 26.4670° North and 80.3500° East, placing it 83 km from Lucknow. Jajmau is situated near the Ganges. The sub metro area of 40 km^{2} extends from Bibipur in the south to Chandar Nagar in the north and Ramadevi in the east to Jajmau extension in the west.

== History ==
The archaeological site of Jajmau is a large mound on the banks of Ganges river, known as the Jajmau ka tila. Copper hoard artefacts and Painted Grey Ware (PGW) sherds were found from the surface deposits of the mound. In 1956, at the time of the construction of the national highway and Jajamu bridge, remains of an ancient settlement were discovered there. Excavations were carried out by the Archaeological Survey of India and the Uttar Pradesh State Archaeology Department in 1956–58 and 1973–78. During the excavations in 1977–78, an ivory seal with Vasalas inscribed in Brahmi was found. A historian, Girish Chandra Singh, said that Vasalas is an epithet of the ancient Maurya emperor Chandragupta.

== Climate ==
Jajmau

Climate chart (precipitation, max. and min. temperature)
J	F	M	A	M	J	J	A	S	O	N	D
22 21 7	11 26 9	8 32 14	5 38 21	17 41 25	107 39 27	294 34 26	314 33 26	181 33 24	45 33 19	4 29 12	7 24 7
- █ Average max. and min. temperatures in °C
- █ Precipitation totals in mm
- Source: World Weather Information Service
Imperial conversion
J	F	M	A	M	J	J	A	S	O	N	D
0.9 69 44	0.4 79 49	0.3 90 58	0.2 101 69	0.7 105 76	4.2 102 81	12 92 79	12 91 78	7.1 91 76	1.8 91 66	0.2 84 53	0.3 75 45
- █ Average max. and min. temperatures in °F
- █ Precipitation totals in inches

The climate of Jajmau is hot in summer and warm in winter. Jajmau experiences heavy fog in December and January. Rains appear between July and September, almost at the end of the regular monsoon season. Some rainfall is recorded during the harvest season of March–April.

== Religion ==
Religions in Jajmau
Religion	Percent
Muslim	60%
Hindu	35%
Others	5%

== Sister cities ==
- Hebron, Palestine
