= Sengar (surname) =

Sengar (Hindi: सेंगर, Punjabi: ਸੇਂਗਰ, Marathi: सेंगर) is a surname. Notable people with the surname include:

- Kratika Sengar, Indian actress
- Kuldeep Singh Sengar (1966), Indian politician
