= Saraswati Hi Tech City, Prayagraj =

Saraswati Hi Tech City
- Native name: Trans Prayagraj Hi Tech City
- Industry: Multiple
- Founded: October 2016
- Headquarters: Prayagraj, Uttar Pradesh, India
- Area served: Naini, Prayagraj
- Website: www.upsidc.com

Saraswati Hi Tech City is a neighbourhood in Naini, Prayagraj, Prayagraj district, Uttar Pradesh, India. The area lies between the limits of Prayagraj Municipality near Triveni Sangam river on NH 76. The Government of Uttar Pradesh is building a university named Allahabad State University, along with a library in Hi-tech city which also has a proposed stadium.

The project is led by Uttar Pradesh State Industrial Development Corporation, on an area of 1,140 acres (460 hectares), and will have industrial areas, residential areas, parks and a museum. It will be 25 km (16 mi) from Prayagraj Airport and 13 km (8.1 mi) from Prayagraj Junction railway station. There will be 1,500 residential properties, including Type-A, Type-B and Type-C and the corresponding size for units is 250 square metres (2,700 sq ft), 200 square metres (2,200 sq ft) and 120 square metres (1,300 sq ft).

== Investments ==
- PepsiCo bottling plant : ₹1,000 crore
- IRCTC drinking water plant: ₹25 crore

== See also ==
- Trans Ganga City
