= Shrikant Katiyar =

Member of the Uttar Pradesh Legislative Assembly

Member of Uttar Pradesh Legislative Assembly
- Incumbent
- Assumed office 2020
- Preceded by: Kuldeep Singh Sengar
- Constituency: Bangarmau

Personal details
- Born: 3 February 1974 (age 52) Unnao, Uttar Pradesh
- Party: Bharatiya Janata Party
- Spouse: Vibha Katiyar
- Children: 2
- Parent: Subedar Katiyar (father)
- Profession: Politician

Shrikant Katiyar is an Indian politician, farmer, and a member of the 18th Uttar Pradesh Assembly from the Bangarmau Assembly constituency of Unnao district. He is a member of the Bharatiya Janata Party.

== Early life ==
Shrikant Katiyar was born on 3 February 1974 in Unnao, Uttar Pradesh, to a Hindu family of Subedar Katiyar. He married Vibha Katiyar on 6 May 2001. They have two children.

== See also ==
- 18th Uttar Pradesh Assembly
- Bangarmau Assembly constituency
- Uttar Pradesh Legislative Assembly
