= Ram Kumar (politician) =

Indian politician

Ram Kumar राम कुमार

Member of Legislative Assembly, Uttar Pradesh
- In office 2000–2002
- Preceded by: Deepak Kumar
- Succeeded by: Kuldeep Singh Sengar
- Constituency: Unnao

Personal details
- Born: 15 July 1957 (age 67); Kanpur, Uttar Pradesh, India
- Political party: Samajwadi Party
- Spouse: Tara Rani (m. 1980)
- Children: 2 sons, 1 daughter
- Parent: Manohar Lal (father)
- Education: M. Sc., L. L. B.

Ram Kumar (born 15 July 1957) is an Indian politician and advocate. He is a former member of the Uttar Pradesh Legislative Assembly from Unnao district.
