= Pankaj Gupta =

Pankaj Gupta may refer to:

- Pankaj Gupta (sports administrator)
- Pankaj Gupta (politician)
