= Bhagwantnagar Assembly constituency =

Constituency of the Uttar Pradesh legislative assembly in India

Coordinates: 26.22°N 80.76°E

Bhagwantnagar
- Constituency No. 166 for the Uttar Pradesh Legislative Assembly

Constituency details
- Country: India
- Region: North India
- State: Uttar Pradesh
- District: Unnao
- Total electors: 4,17,945
- Reservation: None

Member of Legislative Assembly
- 18th Uttar Pradesh Legislative Assembly
- Incumbent Ashutosh Shukla
- Party: BJP
- Elected year: 2022

Bhagwant Nagar Vidhan Sabha seat is one of the constituencies of Uttar Pradesh Legislative Assembly in India. It covers the city of Bhagwantnagar in Unnao district of Uttar Pradesh, India.

Bhagwantnagar is one of six assembly constituencies in the Unnao Lok Sabha constituency. Since 2008, this assembly constituency is numbered 166 amongst 403 constituencies of Uttar Pradesh Legislative Assembly.

== Members of Vidhan Sabha ==
Year	Member	Party
1957	Bhagwati Singh Visharad	Praja Socialist Party
1962	Dev Dutt	Indian National Congress
1967	Bhagwati Singh Visharad	Praja Socialist Party
1969	Bhagwati Singh Visharad	Indian National Congress
1974	Bhagwati Singh Visharad	Indian National Congress
1977	Devaki Nandan	Janata Party
1980	Bhagwati Singh Visharad	Indian National Congress (I)
1985	Bhagwati Singh Visharad	Indian National Congress
1989	Devaki Nandan	Bharatiya Janata Party
1991	Bhagwati Singh Visharad	Indian National Congress
1993	Devaki Nandan	Bharatiya Janata Party
1996	Kripa Shankar Singh	Bharatiya Janata Party
2002	Natthu Singh	Bahujan Samaj Party
2007	Kripa Shankar Singh	Bahujan Samaj Party
2012	Kuldeep Singh Sengar	Samajwadi Party
2017	Hriday Narayan Dikshit	Bharatiya Janata Party
2022	Ashutosh Shukla	Bharatiya Janata Party

== Election results ==
=== 2027 ===
2027 Uttar Pradesh Legislative Assembly election: Bhagwantnagar
Party	Candidate	Votes	%	±%
INDIA				
NDA				
BSP				
NOTA	None of the above			
Majority				
Turnout				
gain from		Swing		

=== 2022 ===
2022 Uttar Pradesh Legislative Assembly election: Bhagwantnagar
Party	Candidate	Votes	%	±%
BJP	Ashutosh Shukla	127,118	51.28	▲7.03
SP	Ankit Singh Parihar	84,108	33.93	
BSP	Brij Kishor Verma	28,441	11.47	▼10.01
INC	Jang Bahadur Singh	2,580	1.04	▼20.13
NOTA	None of the above	2,319	0.94	▼0.24
Majority		43,010	17.35	▼5.42
Turnout		247,886	59.31	▲2.11
BJP hold		Swing		

=== 2017 ===
2017 Uttar Pradesh Legislative Assembly Election: Bhagwantnaga
Party	Candidate	Votes	%	±%
BJP	Hriday Narayan Dikshit	103,698	44.25	
BSP	Shashank Shekhar Singh	50,332	21.48	
INC	Ankit Singh Parihar	49,605	21.17	
LKD	Kripa Shankar Singh	18,988	8.1	
NOTA	None of the above	2,730	1.18	
Majority		53,366	22.77	
Turnout		234,335	57.2	

=== 1977 ===
- Devaki Nandan (Janata Party) : 36,428 votes
- Bhagwati Singh Visharad (INC) : 25,817
