= Bhagwati Singh Visharad =

Indian politician (1921–2019)

Uttar Pradesh Legislative Assembly
- In office 1957–1962
- Preceded by: Constituency Established
- Succeeded by: Dev Datt
- Constituency: Bhagwant Nagar
- In office 1967–1977
- Preceded by: Dev Datt
- Succeeded by: Devki Nandan
- Constituency: Bhagwant Nagar
- In office 1980–1989
- Preceded by: Devki Nandan
- Succeeded by: Devki Nandan
- Constituency: Bhagwant Nagar
- In office 1991–1993
- Preceded by: Devki Nandan
- Succeeded by: Devki Nandan
- Constituency: Bhagwant Nagar

Personal details
- Born: 23 September 1921
- Died: 2 December 2019 (aged 98)
- Party: Indian National Congress

Bhagwati Singh Visharad (23 September 1921 – 2 December 2019) was an Indian politician from Uttar Pradesh. He contested every single Vidhan Sabha election for Bhagwantnagar seat from 1957 to 1993. He was elected as a legislator of the Uttar Pradesh Legislative Assembly seven times, and lost 4 times. He started his career with Praja Socialist Party, but switched to Indian National Congress after 1967 assembly elections.

== Biography ==
Visharad was born on 23 September 1921. He was elected as a member of Uttar Pradesh Legislative Assembly from Bhagwant Nagar in 1957 and 1967 as a Praja Socialist Party candidate. Later, he joined Indian National Congress. Then, he was elected from this constituency in 1969, 1974, 1980, 1985, and 1991.

He lost four times, the final defeat coming in 1993 when he finished fourth behind BJP, JD, and Samajwadi Party candidates. At that point, he retired from electoral politics.

Visharad died on 2 December 2019 at the age of 98.
