= Deepak Tripathi =

British historian (born 1951)

Deepak Tripathi, FRHistS, FRAS (born 1951) is a British historian of Indian origin with particular reference to South Asia, the Middle East, the Cold War, and the United States in the post-Soviet world.

== Life and career ==
Tripathi's grandfather, Pandit Vishwambhar Dayal Tripathi, was a leader in India's independence movement, Member of the Constituent Assembly, and later of the Indian Parliament. His father, Krishna Dev Tripathi, was also a parliamentarian and an academic.

After a year at Aligarh Muslim University, he wrote a book on Afghanistan.

In 2012, Tripathi received his doctorate in social science from the University of Roehampton, where he was an Honorary Fellow at the Crucible Centre for Human Rights Research from 2012 to 2015, and later an associate.

== Reception of his work ==
Tripathi has received praise from various reviewers for his writings on world conflicts, such as in Afghanistan, notably for his trilogy of books Breeding Ground, Overcoming The Bush Legacy in Iraq and Afghanistan, and Imperial Designs.

=== Overcoming the Bush Legacy in Iraq and Afghanistan ===
Christopher Schoppa, in his review for The Washington Post of 'Overcoming the Bush Legacy in Iraq and Afghanistan', writes that "Tripathi has a sound grounding in the politics and myriad cultures that make up the Middle East." But this book is "not for the conservative, Bush-ie camp." It takes a "thoughtful look at the legacy of two increasingly unpopular wars, focusing especially on the human toll." The reviewer concludes: "Whatever your leanings on this subject, one of Tripathi's statements that seems irrefutable is that these wars will forever be linked with the name of our 43rd President, George W. Bush. For better or worse."

=== Breeding Ground ===
Marjorie Cohn, in the History News Network, writes of Breeding Ground: "Tripathi's excellent work ends with a call to replace the military strategy in Afghanistan and Pakistan with development, reconciliation, and reconstruction." and "Breeding Ground makes a significant contribution toward understanding the origins and triggers of terrorism. Tripathi traces the development of a 'culture of violence' in Afghanistan—largely due to resistance against foreign invasion—from the "U.S.-led proxy war" against the USSR to the current U.S. war."

David Hillstrom, in the Foreign Policy Journal, describes Breeding Ground as a "concise yet powerful book" which details the dangerously interlocking decisions and ill-thought-through strategies that inflamed the Afghan conflict. According to Hillstrom, Tripathi used a broad array of sources that only recently became available from both US and Soviet archives. He writes that the tragedy is that Afghanistan, which has now been at war for 40 years, has suffered the same before, from the 'Great Game' that the Russian Empire played with the British Empire in the 19th century; the players then as now had "simplistic strategic goals" but only "a shallow understanding" of Afghanistan itself. Hillstrom finds that Tripathi sums up the tragedy beautifully by closing his book with a quote from Tolstoy:

"In all history there is no war which was not hatched by the governments, the governments alone, independent of the interests of the people, to whom war is always pernicious, even when successful."

=== Imperial Designs ===
Greta Morris, a retired US diplomat, writes in her review of Imperial Designs in American Diplomacy: "As policymakers, scholars and citizens seek to understand the increasingly bitter and violent conflicts in the Middle East and the escalating anger and terrorist acts against the West (particularly the U.S.), Deepak Tripathi's Imperial Designs offers important perspectives and insights. Tripathi's book is subtitled War, Humiliation and the Making of History, and his theme is the role of humiliation in international politics. Specifically, he argues that the humiliation of a state or people by a more powerful state (or states) through political manipulation and military defeat profoundly influences the subsequent actions of the humiliated people, including their desire for revenge." Morris concludes the review with her comment: "Tripathi's excellent summation of past events in the Middle East and his cogent analysis of their continuing implications should be required reading for all who are dealing directly with this troubled region, as well as those seeking to understand it and its relations with the United States."

== Books ==
- Tripathi, D., & Royal Institute of International Affairs. (1989). Sri Lanka's Foreign Policy Dilemmas. London: Royal Institute of International Affairs.
- Tripathi, D., & Observer Research Foundation. (2008). Dialectics of the Afghanistan Conflict. New Delhi: Observer Research Foundation.
- Tripathi, D. (2010). Overcoming the Bush Legacy in Iraq and Afghanistan. Washington, D.C: Potomac Books.
- Tripathi, Deepak (2011). Breeding Ground: Afghanistan and the Origins of Islamist Terrorism. Foreword by Richard Falk. Potomac Books. ISBN 978-1-59797-530-8.
- Tripathi, D. (2013). Imperial Designs: War, Humiliation and the Making of History. Washington, D.C: Potomac Books.
- Tripathi, D. (2013). A Journey Through Turbulence: Writings of Deepak Tripathi. Lake Oswego, Oregon: Dignity Press.
