= Brajesh Pathak =

7th Deputy Chief Minister of Uttar Pradesh

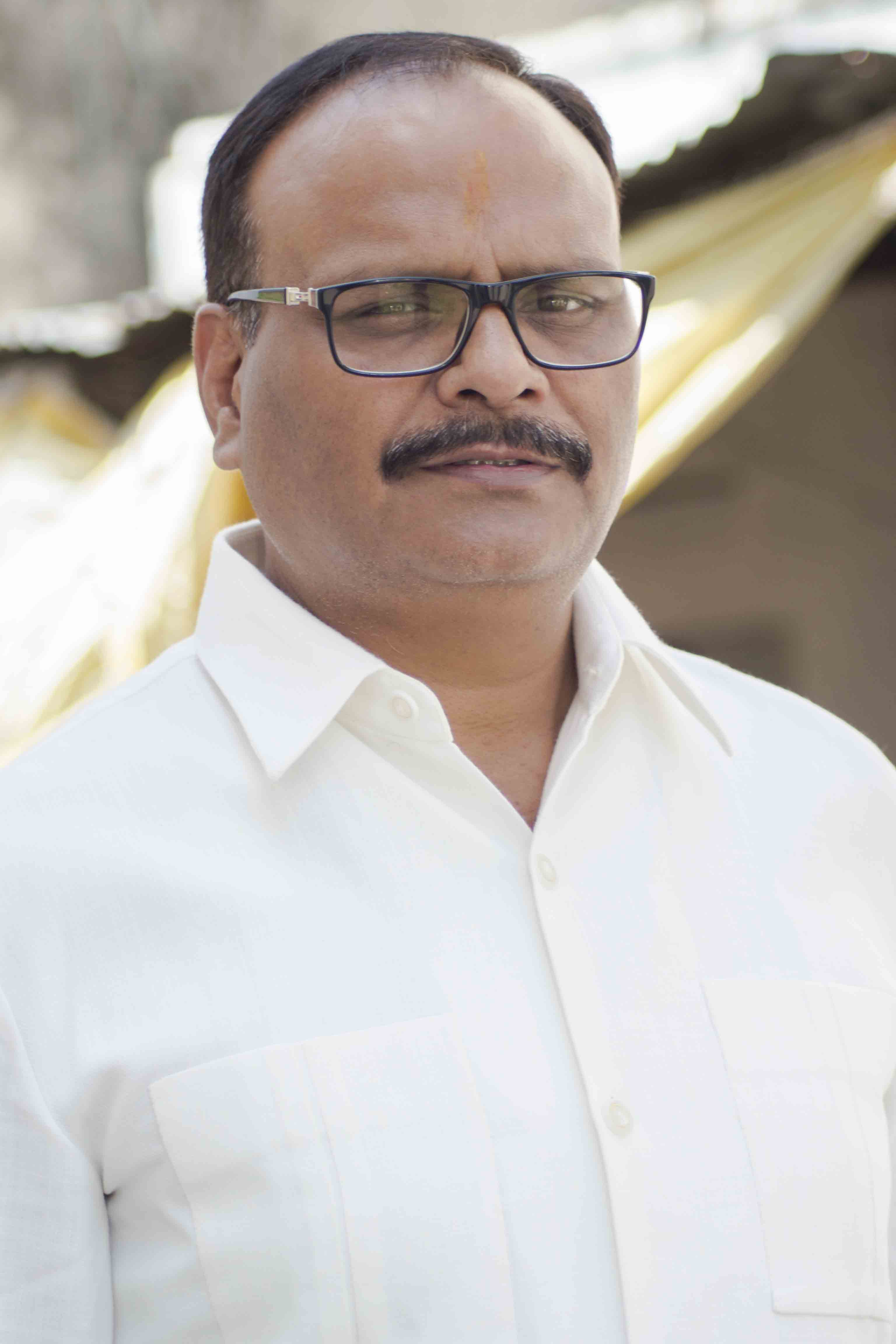
- Official portrait, 2022

6th Deputy Chief Minister of Uttar Pradesh
- Incumbent
- Assumed office 25 March 2022 Serving with Keshav Maurya
- Governor: Anandiben Patel
- Chief Minister: Yogi Adityanath
- Ministry & Departments: Health & Family Welfare (2022-); Medical Education (2022-); Maternity & Child Welfare (2022-)
- Preceded by: Dinesh Sharma

Cabinet Minister, Government of Uttar Pradesh
- In office 19 March 2017 – 25 March 2022
- Ministry&Departments: Legislative; Law & Justice; Rural Engineering
- Succeeded by: Yogi Adityanath

Member of Uttar Pradesh Legislative Assembly
- Incumbent
- Assumed office 10 March 2022
- Preceded by: Suresh Chandra Tiwari
- Constituency: Lucknow Cantonment
- In office 11 March 2017 – 10 March 2022
- Preceded by: Ravidas Mehrotra
- Succeeded by: Ravidas Mehrotra
- Constituency: Lucknow Central

Member of Parliament, Rajya Sabha
- In office 26 November 2008 – 25 November 2014
- Preceded by: Amar Singh
- Succeeded by: Javed Ali Khan
- Constituency: Uttar Pradesh

Member of Parliament, Lok Sabha
- In office 14 May 2004 – 17 May 2009
- Preceded by: Deepak Kumar
- Succeeded by: Annu Tandon
- Constituency: Unnao, Uttar Pradesh

Personal details
- Born: 25 June 1964 (age 62) Mallawan, Uttar Pradesh, India
- Party: Bharatiya Janata Party (2016–present)
- Other political affiliations: Bahujan Samaj Party (2004–2016)
- Spouse: Namrata Pathak
- Education: University of Lucknow
- Occupation: Politician
- Profession: Lawyer
- As of 29 March 2022

Brajesh Pathak (born 25 June 1964) is an Indian politician and a member of the 18th Legislative Assembly of Uttar Pradesh. Presently, he is serving as the 6th Deputy Chief Minister (alongside Keshav Maurya since 2023) and Cabinet Minister of Medical Education, Medical and Health, and Family Welfare in the Government of Uttar Pradesh.

He was also the cabinet minister for Law and Justice in the 17th Legislative Assembly of Uttar Pradesh. He has also been a Lok Sabha member of Parliament from the Unnao constituency from 2004 to 2009 and Rajya Sabha member of Parliament from 2008 to 2014. In the 2022 Uttar Pradesh Legislative Assembly election, he won by a great margin from the Lucknow Cantonment constituency in Lucknow district.

== Early life and education ==
He has been an active member of student politics and public service since his days in Lucknow University. In the year 1990, he was the President of the Students' Union of the prestigious Lucknow University.

== Political career ==
From being the face of student politics in Lucknow Brajesh Pathak, in 2004 general elections, Brajesh Pathak defeated Deepak Kumar from the Lok Sabha Constituency of Unnao and became a member of parliament and was later part of Rajya Sabha from 2008 to 2014.

In 2017, he was elected as an MLA from Lucknow Central by defeating Ravidas Malhotara from the Samajwadi Party and was appointed Cabinet Minister of Law and Justice in the Government of Uttar Pradesh. He was sworn in as the Cabinet Minister for Law and Legislative, Additional Sources of Energy and Political Pensions on 19 March 2017. On 21 August 2019, after the first cabinet expansion of the Yogi government, his portfolio was changed to that of the Minister of Legislative, Justice, Rural Engineering Services. On 25 March 2022, he became the 7th Deputy Chief Minister of Uttar Pradesh.

During his tenure as a Member of Parliament, he has been a member of the Public Grievances committee, Law and Justice committee, Business Advisory Committee, Public Accounts Committee, Home Ministry Member, Consultative Committee of Delimitation Commission. Member, Standing Committee on External Affairs, Committee of Privileges, Standing Committee on Coal and Steel, Standing Committee on Finance, member of the National Committee on NCC. Committee on Railways, Consultative Committee for the Ministry of Petroleum and Natural Gas, Committee on Home Affairs, General Purposes Committee, Member of House Committee, he was nominated as the chairman of the Health and Family Welfare Committee.
