= Trans Ganga City =

Trans Ganga City is an under construction satellite township in Indian state of Uttar Pradesh in Kanpur Nagar district which comes under Kanpur metropolitan area. The area comprises stretch from the limits of Unnao Municipality to Ganga river near Kanpur on NH 25 and Unnao-Shuklaganj Highway. The Government of Uttar Pradesh has also proposed Skill Development University near the proposed Hi-tech city. The proposed Kanpur Outer Ring Road will pass from Trans Ganga city which will further connect it to the under construction Lucknow–Kanpur Expressway at Azad Marg Chauraha situated at a distance of 10 kilometres from Trans Ganga.The Kanpur Outer Ring Road shall also be connected with the under construction new terminal of Kanpur Airport by a connector road which is at the distance of 20 kilometres from Trans Ganga and shall be just 30 minutes drive from the Hi-tech city.
