= Safipur Assembly constituency =

Constituency of the Uttar Pradesh legislative assembly in India

Coordinates: 26.74°N 80.35°E

Safipur
- Constituency No. 163 for the Uttar Pradesh Legislative Assembly

Constituency details
- Country: India
- Region: North India
- State: Uttar Pradesh
- District: Unnao
- Total electors: 3,46,258
- Reservation: SC

Member of Legislative Assembly
- 18th Uttar Pradesh Legislative Assembly
- Incumbent Bamba Lal Diwakar
- Party: BJP
- Elected year: 2022

Safipur is a constituency of the Uttar Pradesh Legislative Assembly covering the city of Safipur and other parts of Safipur tehsil and Hasanganj tehsil, in Unnao district of Uttar Pradesh, India. It is one of six assembly constituencies in the Unnao Lok Sabha constituency. As of 2022, the constituency is represented by Bharatiya Janata Party's Bamba Lal Diwakar.

== Members of the Legislative Assembly ==
Election	Name	Party
2012	Sudhir Kumar Rawat	Samajwadi Party
2017	Bamba Lal Diwakar	Bharatiya Janata Party
2022	Bamba Lal Diwakar	Bharatiya Janata Party

== Election results ==
=== 2027 ===
2027 Uttar Pradesh Legislative Assembly election: Safipur
Party	Candidate	Votes	%	±%
INDIA				
NDA				
BSP				
NOTA	None of the above			
Majority				
Turnout				
gain from		Swing		

=== 2022 ===
2022 Uttar Pradesh Legislative Assembly election: Safipur
Party	Candidate	Votes	%	±%
BJP	Bamba Lal Diwakar	102,968	52.13	+9.5
SP	Sudhir kumar Rawat	68,836	34.85	+10.26
BSP	Rajendra Kumar	19,768	10.01	−18.81
NOTA	None of the above	1,745	0.88	−0.05
Majority		34,132	17.28	+3.47
Turnout		197,535	57.05	−3.11
BJP hold		Swing		

=== 2017 ===
2017 Uttar Pradesh Legislative Assembly Election: Safipur
Party	Candidate	Votes	%	±%
BJP	Bamba Lal Diwakar	84,068	42.63	
BSP	Ram Baran	56,832	28.82	
SP	Sudhir Kumar Rawat	48,506	24.59	
RLD	Bablu Rawat	2,056	1.04	
NOTA	None of the above	1,820	0.93	
Majority		27,236	13.81	
Turnout		197,225	60.16	
