= Annu Tandon =

Indian politician

Member of Parliament, Lok Sabha
- In office 16 May 2009 — 16 May 2014
- Preceded by: Brajesh Pathak
- Succeeded by: Sakshi Maharaj
- Constituency: Unnao

Personal details
- Born: 15 November 1957 (age 68) Unnao, Uttar Pradesh, India
- Party: Samajwadi Party (since November 2020)
- Other political affiliations: Indian National Congress (till October 2020)
- Spouse: Sandeep Tandon (m. 1976, died)
- Children: 2
- Education: Dayananda Subhash National Post Graduate College (Unnao), Kanpur University (B. Sc, 1977)
- Profession: Business, Social worker

Annu Tandon (born 11 November 1957) is an Indian politician. She was an MP in the 15th Lok Sabha from Unnao, Uttar Pradesh with the Indian National Congress party. She left Congress in 2020 to join Samajwadi Party. Tandon is the founder director of the Hriday Narain Dhawan Charitable Trust, which has been active in philanthropy in the district since before 2000. The charity, funded mostly through family funds, has worked in education, and gathered attention for innovative projects like helping children of illiterate parents with their homework.

== Life and family ==
Annu Tandon was born on 11 November 1957 in Unnao to Hriday Narain Dhawan and Kripawati Dhawan. She did her Intermediate from Rajkiya Balika Inter College, Unnao in 1975 and received a Bachelor of Science degree from Dayanand Subhash National Post Graduate College, Unnao in 1977.

She married Sandeep Tandon on 22 December 1976, with whom she has two sons. Her husband was a liaison executive of Reliance Industries Ltd. Before joining Reliance in 1994, he was with the Indian Revenue Service. As an officer of the Enforcement Directorate, S. Tandon had investigated foreign front companies floated by Reliance, and also conducted a raid on the house of Tina Ambani.

The entire family has close connections with Mukesh Ambani, two of their sons also being former employees of Reliance.

She had declared assets of 41 crores (US$10 mn) in the 2009 election declarations. She declared assets of 42 crores (US$10+ mn) in the 2014 election declarations.

== 2014 elections ==
In the Indian general election in Uttar Pradesh, 2014, Annu Tandon was again fielded as a candidate by the Congress. Unnao is India's largest electoral constituency, and in the previous general elections in 2009, Annu Tandon had won the seat for Congress. Annu Tandon lost the 2014 elections from Unnao badly - she was 4th in the election results barely retaining her deposits at 16% votes. After Congress' resounding defeat in 2014 elections, Annu refused to blame Congress leadership for the debacle.

== 2009 elections ==
In the Indian general election in Uttar Pradesh, 2009, Annu Tandon was fielded as a novice political candidate by the Congress. Unnao is India's largest electoral constituency, and in the previous general elections in 2004, Congress had come up fourth here, and the seat had been won by the Bahujan Samaj Party (BSP). During the elections, many prominent personalities including film star Salman Khan campaigned for her.

== Samajwadi Party ==
In October 2020, Tandon resigned from the Indian National Congress party. She joined Samajwadi Party on 2 November 2020.

== Career ==
She has served as a member on the Committee of Water Resources and that on Empowerment of Women in 2009 when she was part of the 15th Lok Sabha. In the year 2007, MoTech then led by her was under scrutiny for insider trading by regulator SEBI.

In February 2015, Annu Tandon's name figured at position 22 (balance $5.7mn) in the list of Indians with accounts in the HSBC Swiss Private bank (Swiss Leaks).
