= Bangarmau Assembly constituency =

Constituency of the Uttar Pradesh legislative assembly in India

Coordinates: 26.89°N 80.21°E

Bangarmau
- Constituency No. 162 for the Uttar Pradesh Legislative Assembly

Constituency details
- Country: India
- Region: North India
- State: Uttar Pradesh
- District: Unnao
- Total electors: 3,57,452
- Reservation: None

Member of Legislative Assembly
- 18th Uttar Pradesh Legislative Assembly
- Incumbent Shrikant Katiyar
- Party: Bharatiya Janata Party
- Elected year: 2022
- Preceded by: Kuldeep Singh Sengar

Bangarmau is a constituency of the Uttar Pradesh Legislative Assembly covering the city of Bangarmau in the Unnao district of Uttar Pradesh, India. It is one of six assembly constituencies in the Unnao Lok Sabha constituency. Since 2008, this assembly constituency has numbered 162 among 403 constituencies.

This seat belonged to candidate Kuldeep Singh Sengar who won in the last Assembly election for the 4th time of 2017 Uttar Pradesh Legislative Elections defeating Samajwadi Party candidate Badaloo Khan by a margin of 28,237 votes.

== Members of Vidhan Sabha ==
Year	Member	Party
1962	Sewa Ram	Indian National Congress
1967	Shivgopal Tiwari	Bharatiya Jana Sangh
1969	Gopi Nath Dixit	Indian National Congress
1974	Raghvendra Singh	Bharatiya Kranti Dal
1977	Jagdish Prasad Trivedi	Janata Party
1980	Gopi Nath Dixit	Indian National Congress (Indira)
1985	Gopi Nath Dixit	Indian National Congress
1989	Ashok Kumar Singh	Janata Dal
1991	Gopi Nath Dixit	Indian National Congress
1993	Ashok Kumar Singh	Samajwadi Party
1996	Ram Shankar Pal	Bahujan Samaj Party
2002	Ram Shankar Pal	Bahujan Samaj Party
2007	Kuldeep Singh Sengar	Samajwadi Party
2012	Badlu Khan	Samajwadi Party
2017	Kuldeep Singh Sengar	Bharatiya Janata Party
2020^	Shrikant Katiyar	Bharatiya Janata Party
2022	Shrikant Katiyar	Bharatiya Janata Party

== Election results ==
=== 2027 ===
2027 Uttar Pradesh Legislative Assembly election: Bangarmau
Party	Candidate	Votes	%	±%
INDIA				
NDA				
BSP				
NOTA	None of the above			
Majority				
Turnout				
gain from		Swing		

=== 2022 ===
2022 Uttar Pradesh Legislative Assembly election: Bangarmau
Party	Candidate	Votes	%	±%
BJP	Shrikant Katiyar	90,980	44.7	▲1.32
SP	Dr. Munna Alvi	75,187	36.94	▲7.58
BSP	Ram kishore Pal	25,543	12.55	▼9.59
INC	Arti Bajpai	5,285	2.6	
NOTA	None of the above	1,267	0.62	▼0.32
Majority		15,793	7.76	▼6.26
Turnout		203,527	56.94	▼2.86
BJP hold		Swing		

=== 2020 ===
By Polls, 2020: Bangermau
Party	Candidate	Votes	%	±%
BJP	Shrikant Katiyar	71,381	40.98	▼2.81
INC	Arti Bajpai	39,983	22.96	▲22.96
SP	Suresh Kumar Pal	35,322	20.28	▼12.17
BSP	Mahesh Prasad	19,062	10.94	▼11.4
	Rest of the candidates	6,985	4.04	▼0.20
NOTA	None of the Above	1,438	0.83	▼0.11
Majority		31,398	18.02	
Turnout		1,74,228	50.77	
BJP hold		Swing		

=== 2017 ===
2017 Uttar Pradesh Legislative Assembly election: Bangarmau
Party	Candidate	Votes	%	±%
BJP	Kuldeep Singh Sengar	87,657	43.38	
SP	Badlu khan	59,330	29.36	
BSP	Mohd Irshad Khan	44,730	22.14	
NOTA	None of the above	1,873	0.94	
Majority		28,327	14.02	
Turnout		202,064	59.8	
BJP gain from SP		Swing		
