= Purwa Assembly constituency =

Constituency of the Uttar Pradesh legislative assembly in India

Coordinates: 26.46°N 80.77°E

Purwa
- Constituency No. 167 for the Uttar Pradesh Legislative Assembly

Constituency details
- Country: India
- Region: North India
- State: Uttar Pradesh
- District: Unnao
- Total electors: 4,15,472
- Reservation: None

Member of Legislative Assembly
- 18th Uttar Pradesh Legislative Assembly
- Incumbent Anil Kumar Singh
- Party: BJP
- Elected year: 2022

Purwa is a constituency of the Uttar Pradesh Legislative Assembly covering the city of Purwa in the Unnao district of Uttar Pradesh, India.

Purwa is one of six assembly constituencies in the Unnao Lok Sabha constituency. Since 2008, this assembly constituency is numbered 167 amongst 403 constituencies.

Currently this seat belongs to Bahujan Samaj Party candidate Anil Kumar Singh who won in the Assembly election of 2017 Uttar Pradesh Legislative Elections defeating Bharatiya Janta Party candidate Uttam Chandra Lodhi by a margin of 26,483 votes.

Anil Singh also won in last Assembly election of 2022 Uttar Pradesh Legislative Elections defeating Samajwadi Party candidate Udayraj Yadav by a margin of 31,061 votes.

== Members of Legislative Assembly ==
Year	Member	Party
1952	Ramadhin Singh	Indian National Congress
1957	Parmeshwari Din Varma	Independent
1962	Ramadhin Singh	Indian National Congress
1967	Lakhan Singh	Bharatiya Jana Sangh
1969	Dularey Lal	Indian National Congress
1974	Gaya Singh	Indian National Congress
1977	Chandra Bhushan Singh	Janata Party
1980	Gaya Singh	Indian National Congress (I)
1985	Hriday Narayan Dikshit	Independent
1989	Hriday Narayan Dikshit	Janata Dal
1991	Hriday Narayan Dikshit	Janata Party
1993	Hriday Narayan Dikshit	Samajwadi Party
1996	Udayraj Yadav	Samajwadi Party
2002	Udayraj Yadav	Samajwadi Party
2007	Udayraj Yadav	Samajwadi Party
2012	Udayraj Yadav	Samajwadi Party
2017	Anil Kumar Singh	Bahujan Samaj Party
2022	Anil Kumar Singh	Bharatiya Janata Party

== Results ==
=== 2027 ===
2027 Uttar Pradesh Legislative Assembly election: Purwa
Party	Candidate	Votes	%	±%
INDIA				
NDA				
BSP				
NOTA	None of the above			
Majority				
Turnout				
gain from		Swing		

=== 2022 ===
2022 Uttar Pradesh Legislative Assembly election: Purwa
Party	Candidate	Votes	%	±%
BJP	Anil Kumar Singh	133,827	52.27	23.25
SP	Udayraj Yadav	102,766	40.14	12.33
BSP	Vinod Kumar	10,557	4.12	−35.71
NOTA	None of the Above	2609	1.02	−0.1
Majority		31,061	12.13	1.32
Turnout		256018	61.62	−1.17

=== 2017 ===
2017 Uttar Pradesh Legislative Assembly Election: Purwa
Party	Candidate	Votes	%	±%
BSP	Anil Kumar Singh	97,567	39.83	
BJP	Uttam Chandra Lodhi	71,084	29.02	
SP	Udayraj Yadav	68,114	27.81	
RLD	Chhabi Nath	1,318	0.54	
BMP	Shiv Shankar Kushwaha	1,033	0.42	
LKD	Chhedi Lal Yadav	962	0.39	
Independent	Baijnath Pal	961	0.39	
Jan Adhikar Manch	Dr. Rajendra Singh Kushwaha	597	0.24	
RSPS	Vinod Kumar Pal	578	0.24	
NOTA	None of the Above	2719	1.12	
Majority		26,483	10.81	
Turnout		244933	62.79	
