= Anwar Ahmad =

Indian politician (born 1926)

Anwar Ahmed

Member of Parliament, Lok Sabha
- In office 1989–1991
- Preceded by: Ziaur Rahman Ansari
- Succeeded by: Devi Bux Singh
- Constituency: Unnao, Uttar Pradesh

Personal details
- Born: 26 March 1926 Neotani, Unnao District, United Provinces, British India (present-day Uttar Pradesh, India)
- Died: 15 April 2019 (aged 93)
- Party: Samajwadi party,Janata Dal

Anwar Ahmad (26 March 1926 – 15 April 2019) was an Indian politician. He was elected to the Lok Sabha, the lower house of the Parliament of India from the Unnao constituency of Uttar Pradesh as a member of the Janata Dal.
