= Kanpur Bridge Left Bank railway station =

Railway station in Uttar Pradesh, India

Kanpur Bridge Left Bank

General information
- System: Indian Railways station
Location
- Location within India Location within Uttar Pradesh

Kanpur Bridge Left Bank is a small railway station in Shuklaganj, in the Unnao district of Uttar Pradesh, India. It lies on the Kanpur–Lucknow line in the Northern Railway zone. It comes after the Ganges bridge has been crossed. Only a few trains such as LKM (Lucknow–Kanpur MEMU), a type of local train halts for only 1 or 2 minutes or some Express train halts for some special reason or has to be given a pass.

Other than the Passenger trains between Kanpur and Lucknow; the Passenger trains running between Kanpur Central and Raebareli Junction and Kanpur Central to Balamau Junction also halts here. Also the Lucknow Junction to Kasganj Passenger and Lucknow Charbagh to Jhansi Passenger are among the trains halting here.

There are nearly 20 trains halting here per day as per railway schedule.

This station has two platforms, one for Kanpur–Unnao line and other for Unnao–Kanpur line. The platform for Kanpur–Unnao line is well raised and sheltered and with a ticket window present at this side.

It lacks the facilities of water and foot overbridge for going from one platform to another.
