= Krishna Dev Tripathi =

Indian politician (born 1930)

Member of Parliament, Lok Sabha
- In office 1962–1971
- Preceded by: Lila Dhar Asthana
- Succeeded by: Ziaur Rahman Ansari
- Constituency: Unnao, Uttar Pradesh

Personal details
- Born: 6 April 1930
- Party: Indian National Congress

Krishna Dev Tripathi (born 6 April 1930) was an Indian politician. He was elected to the Lok Sabha, the lower house of the Parliament of India from the Unnao constituency of Uttar Pradesh as a member of the Indian National Congress.
