= Lucknow Cantonment Assembly constituency =

Constituency of the Uttar Pradesh legislative assembly in India

Lucknow Cantonment
- Constituency No. 175 for the Uttar Pradesh Legislative Assembly

Constituency details
- Country: India
- Region: North India
- State: Uttar Pradesh
- District: Lucknow
- Lok Sabha constituency: Lucknow
- Total electors: 3,68,156
- Reservation: None

Member of Legislative Assembly
- 18th Uttar Pradesh Legislative Assembly
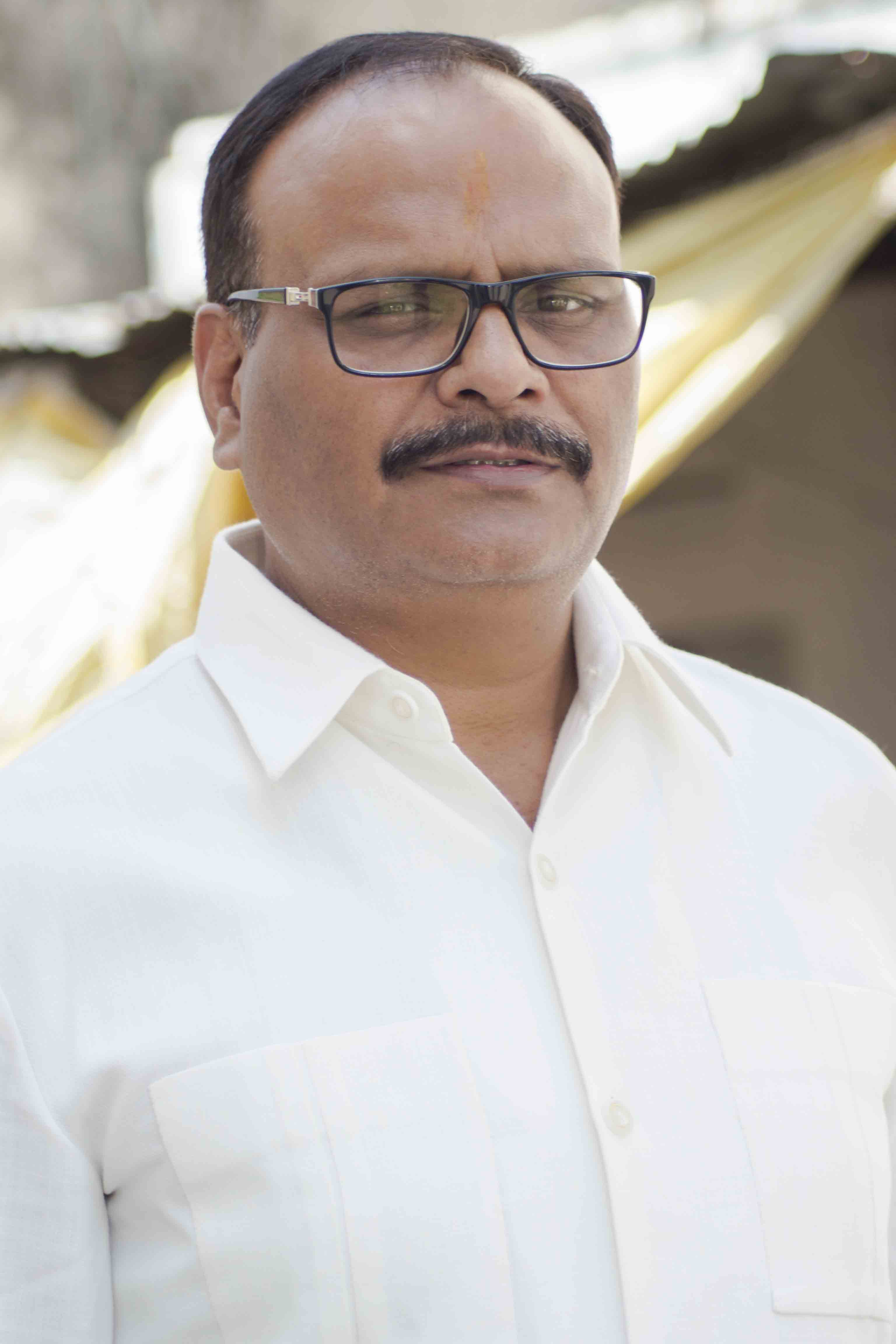
- Incumbent Brajesh Pathak
- Party: BJP
- Alliance: NDA
- Elected year: 2022

Lucknow Cantt. is a constituency of the Uttar Pradesh Legislative Assembly covering the cantonment part of the city of Lucknow in Lucknow district of Uttar Pradesh, India.

Lucknow Cantt. is one of five assembly constituencies in the Lucknow Lok Sabha constituency. Since 2008, this assembly constituency is numbered 175 amongst 403 constituencies.

Currently this constituency is represented by Brajesh Pathak, who won in 2022 Uttar Pradesh Legislative Assembly election. The current MLA of this constituency is also serving as the Deputy Chief Minister of the state.

== Members of Legislative Assembly ==
Year	Member	Party
1957	Shyam Manohar Misra	Indian National Congress
1962	Balak Ram Vaish	Indian National Congress
1967	Badri Prasad Awasthi	Independent
1969	Sachchidanand	Bharatiya Kranti Dal
1974	Charan Singh	Indian National Congress
1977	Krishna Kant Misra	Janata Party
1980	Premavati Tiwari	Indian National Congress (I)
1985	Premavati Tiwari	Indian National Congress
1989	Premavati Tiwari	Indian National Congress
1991	Satish Bhatia	Bharatiya Janata Party
1993	Satish Bhatia	Bharatiya Janata Party
1996	Suresh Chandra Tiwari	Bharatiya Janata Party
2002	Suresh Chandra Tiwari	Bharatiya Janata Party
2007	Suresh Chandra Tiwari	Bharatiya Janata Party
2012	Rita Bahuguna Joshi	Indian National Congress
2017	Rita Bahuguna Joshi	Bharatiya Janata Party
2019^	Suresh Chandra Tiwari	Bharatiya Janata Party
2022	Brajesh Pathak	Bharatiya Janata Party

^ denotes bypoll

== Election results ==
Vote share of winning candidates
2022	54.70%
2019	51.03%
2017	50.90%
2012	38.95%
2007	30.76%
2002	40.52%
1996	63.82%
1993	52.06%
1991	53.18%
1989	33.95%

=== 2027 ===
2027 Uttar Pradesh Legislative Assembly election: Lucknow Cantonment
Party	Candidate	Votes	%	±%
BJP				
INDIA				
BSP				
NOTA	None of the above			
Majority				
Turnout				
gain from		Swing		

=== 2022 ===
2022 Uttar Pradesh Legislative Assembly election: Lucknow Cantonment
Party	Candidate	Votes	%	±%
BJP	Brajesh Pathak	108,147	54.7	+3.8
SP	Surendra Singh Gandhi	68,635	34.71	+1.84
BSP	Anil Pandey	10,426	5.27	−8.62
INC	Dilpreet Singh Virk	6,510	3.29	
NOTA	None of the above	1,217	0.62	
Majority		39,512	19.99	+1.96
Turnout		197,716	53.7	+2.81
BJP hold		Swing	{{{swing}}}	

=== 2019 bypoll ===
2019 By-election: Lucknow Cantonment
Party	Candidate	Votes	%	±%
BJP	Suresh Chandra Tiwari	56,684	51.03	
SP	Major Ashish Chaturvedi	21,256	19.14	
INC	Dilpreet Singh Virk	19,445	17.51	
BSP	Arun Dwivedi	10,709	9.64	
NOTA	None of the Above	1,368	1.23	
Majority		35,428	31.89	
Turnout		1,11,079	28.81	
BJP hold		Swing		

=== 2017 ===
2017 Uttar Pradesh Legislative Assembly election: Lucknow Cantonment
Party	Candidate	Votes	%	±%
BJP	Rita Bahuguna Joshi	95,402	50.9	
SP	Aparna Yadav	61,606	32.87	
BSP	Yogesh Dixit	26,036	13.89	
NOTA	None of the above	1,150	0.62	
Majority		33,796	18.03	
Turnout		187,433	50.89	
BJP gain from INC		Swing		

=== 2012 ===
2012 Uttar Pradesh state assembly election: Lucknow Cantonment
Party	Candidate	Votes	%	±%
INC	Rita Bahuguna Joshi	63,052	38.95	
BJP	Suresh Chandra Tiwari	41,299	25.51	
BSP	Naveen Chandra Dwivedi	28,851	17.82	
SP	Suresh Chauhan	22,544	13.93	
Majority		21,753	13.44	
Turnout		1,61,890	50.47	
INC gain from BJP		Swing		

=== 2007 ===
2007 Uttar Pradesh state assembly election: Lucknow Cantonment
Party	Candidate	Votes	%	±%
BJP	Suresh Chandra Tiwari	30,444	30.76	
BSP	Arvind Kumar Tripathi	25,068	25.33	
SP	Sharda Pratap Shukla	19,290	19.49	
INC	Murli Dhar	19,280	19.48	
RTKP	Shahid Ali	1,024	1.03	
Majority		5,376	5.43	
Turnout		98,951	29.64	
BJP hold		Swing		

=== 2002 ===
U. P. Legislative Assembly Election, 2002: Lucknow Cantonment
Party	Candidate	Votes	%	±%
BJP	Suresh Chandra Tiwari	36,473	40.52	
SP	Sharda Pratap Shukla	21,126	23.47	
INC	Rajendra Singh	20,527	22.80	
BSP	Balbir Singh Saluja	6,134	6.81	
Independent	Sridevi Kinner	3,527	3.92	
Majority		15,347	17.05	
Turnout		90,020	31.48	
BJP hold		Swing		

=== 1996 ===
U. P. Legislative Assembly Elections, 1996: Lucknow Cantonment
Party	Candidate	Votes	%	±%
BJP	Suresh Chandra Tiwari	61,836	63.82	
SP	Raj Kishore Mishra	18,050	18.63	
BSP	Subhash Kapoor	15,473	15.97	
Independent	Uday Pratap Singh	609	0.63	
BHJS	Om Prakash	555	0.57	
Majority		43,786	45.19	
Turnout		96,888	36.46	
BJP hold		Swing		

=== 1993 ===
U. P. Legislative Assembly Election, 1993 Lucknow Cantonment
Party	Candidate	Votes	%	±%
BJP	Satish Bhatia	48,898	52.06	
SP	Gurubux Singh	26,852	28.59	
INC	Premavati Tiwari	15,098	16.08	
JD	A. C. Bahuguna	712	0.76	
JP	Vimal Singh	371	0.40	
Majority		22,046	23.47	
Turnout		93,920	48.86	
BJP hold		Swing		

=== 1991 ===
U. P. Legislative Assembly Election, 1991: Lucknow Cantonment
Party	Candidate	Votes	%	±%
BJP	Satish Bhatia	32,159	53.18	
INC	Premavati Tiwari	15,803	26.13	
JP	Shiva Chand Sahu	7,105	11.75	
BSP	Rasheed Bhartiya	2,072	3.43	
JD	Urmila Singh	1,681	2.78	
Majority		16,356	27.05	
Turnout		60,468	27.69	
BJP gain from INC		Swing		

=== 1989 ===
U. P. Legislative Assembly Election, 1989: Lucknow Cantonment
Party	Candidate	Votes	%	±%
INC	Premavati Tiwari	19,204	33.95	
JD	Sachchidanand	17,145	30.31	
BJP	S. C. Bhatia	16,196	28.63	
BSP	Jawahar	1,502	2.66	
Independent	Abdul Nasir Naasir	1,145	2.02	
Majority		2,059	3.64	
Turnout		56,570	26.54	
INC hold		Swing		
