= Bamba Lal Diwakar =

Member of the Uttar Pradesh Legislative Assembly

Member of Uttar Pradesh Legislative Assembly
- Incumbent
- Assumed office March 2017
- Constituency: Safipur

Personal details
- Born: 7 November 1974 (age 51) Mumbai, Maharashtra
- Party: Bharatiya Janata Party
- Profession: Politician

Bamba Lal Diwakar is an Indian politician and a member of the 18th Uttar Pradesh Assembly from the Safipur Assembly constituency of Unnao district. He is a member of the Bharatiya Janata Party.

== Early life ==
Bambalal Diwakar was born on 7 November 1974 in Mumbai, India, to a Hindu family of Ram Chandra. He married Kanchan Lata in 1992, and they had three children.

== See also ==
- 18th Uttar Pradesh Assembly
- Safipur Assembly constituency
- Uttar Pradesh Legislative Assembly
