= Unnao Assembly constituency =

Constituency of the Uttar Pradesh legislative assembly in India

Unnao
- Constituency No. 165 for the Uttar Pradesh Legislative Assembly

Constituency details
- Country: India
- Region: North India
- State: Uttar Pradesh
- District: Unnao
- Reservation: None

Member of Legislative Assembly
- 18th Uttar Pradesh Legislative Assembly
- Incumbent Pankaj Gupta
- Party: BJP
- Elected year: 2022

Unnao is a constituency of the Uttar Pradesh Legislative Assembly covering the city of Unnao in the Unnao district of Uttar Pradesh, India.

Unnao is one of six assembly constituencies in the Unnao Lok Sabha constituency. Since 2008, this assembly constituency is numbered 165 amongst 403 constituencies.

== Members of Legislative Assembly ==
Year	Member	Party
1952	Leeladhar Asthana	Indian National Congress
1957	Khajan Singh	Praja Socialist Party
1962	Ziaur Rehman	Indian National Congress
1967	Ziaur Rehman	Indian National Congress
1969	Anwar Ahmad	Bharatiya Kranti Dal
1974	Shiv Pal Singh	Bharatiya Kranti Dal
1977	Chandra Pal Singh	Janata Party
1980	Shiv Pal Singh	Janata Party (Secular)
1985	Manohar Lal	Lokdal
1989	Manohar Lal	Janata Dal
1991	Shiv Pal Singh	Bharatiya Janata Party
1993	Manohar Lal	Samajwadi Party
1996	Deepak Kumar	Samajwadi Party
2000^	Ram Kumar	Samajwadi Party
2002	Kuldeep Singh Sengar	Bahujan Samaj Party
2007	Deepak Kumar	Samajwadi Party
2012	Deepak Kumar	Samajwadi Party
2014^	Pankaj Gupta	Bharatiya Janata Party
2017	Pankaj Gupta	Bharatiya Janata Party
2022	Pankaj Gupta	Bharatiya Janata Party

== Election results ==
=== 2027 ===
2027 Uttar Pradesh Legislative Assembly election: Unnao
Party	Candidate	Votes	%	±%
INDIA				
NDA				
BSP				
NOTA	None of the above			
Majority				
Turnout				
gain from		Swing		

=== 2022 ===
Bharatiya Janata Party candidate Pankaj Gupta won in 2022 Uttar Pradesh Legislative Elections defeating Samajwadi Party candidate Anubhav Kumar by a margin of 31,128 votes.

2022 Uttar Pradesh Legislative Assembly election: Unnao
Party	Candidate	Votes	%	±%
BJP	Pankaj Gupta	126,670	51.62	▼0.08
SP	Anubhav Kumar	95,542	38.94	▲7.14
BSP	Devendra Singh	15,605	6.36	▼5.19
NOTA	None of the above	1,425	0.58	▼0.22
Majority		31,128	12.68	▼7.22
Turnout		245,372	59.86	▼0.64
BJP hold		Swing		

=== 2017 ===
Bharatiya Janata Party candidate Pankaj Gupta won in 2017 Uttar Pradesh Legislative Elections defeating Samajwadi Party candidate Manisha Deepak by a margin of 46,072 votes.

U. P. Legislative Assembly Election, 2017: Unnao
Party	Candidate	Votes	%	±%
BJP	Pankaj Gupta	119,669	51.7	
SP	Manisha Deepak	73,597	31.8	
BSP	Pankaj Tripathi	26,739	11.55	
Independent	Suresh Kumar Pal	4,888	2.11	
NOTA	None of the above	1,843	0.8	
Majority		46,072	19.9	
Turnout		231,457	60.5	
BJP hold		Swing		

=== 2014 ===
By Election, 2014: Unnao
Party	Candidate	Votes	%	±%
BJP	Pankaj Gupta	1,09,822	51.34	
SP	Manisha Deepak	54,629	25.54	
BSP	Ashok Kumar Singh	26,578	12.42	
INC	Kamal Kumar Tiwari	17,789	8.31	
AD(K)	Rajesh Kumar Srivastava	891	0.41	
NOTA	None of the Above	1,947	0.91	
Margin of victory		55,193	25.80	
Turnout		2,13,879	56.87	
BJP gain from SP		Swing		

=== 2012 ===
U. P. Legislative Assembly Election, 2012: Unnao
Party	Candidate	Votes	%	±%
SP	Deepak Kumar	61,695	33.85	
BJP	Pankaj Gupta	51,550	28.28	
BSP	Namrata Pathak	48,397	26.55	
INC	Shiv Pal Singh	10,707	5.87	
IND.	Deepak Kumar	1,603	0.88	
Margin of victory		10,145	5.57	
Turnout		1,82,257	57.45	
SP hold		Swing		
