= Devi Bux Singh =

Indian politician

Devi Baksh Singh

Member of the 10th Lok Sabha, 11th Lok Sabha and 12th Lok Sabha
- In office 1991–1999
- Preceded by: Anwar Ahmad
- Succeeded by: Deepak Kumar
- Constituency: Unnao

Personal details
- Born: 14 May 1940 Karmi Gadhewa, Unnao district, Uttar Pradesh
- Died: 9 Feb 2026 (age 85)
- Party: Bharatiya Janata Party
- Spouse: Kamla Devi Singh (m..1960)
- Education: Matriculation; Tedha Inter College, Unnao
- Occupation: Politician, Agriculturist, Trader and Industrialist

Devi Baksh Singh (14 May 1940 – 9 February 2026) was an Indian politician. He was a former member of the Lok Sabha for three consecutive terms. He was associated with the Bharatiya Janata Party since 1989.
