= Anil Kumar Singh (politician) =

Indian politician (born 1979)

Anil Kumar Singh Member of the Uttar Pradesh Legislative Assembly
- Born: 8 February 1979 (age 47)
- Education: Intermediate
- Political party: Bharatiya Janata Party

Anil Kumar Singh is an Indian politician of the Bharatiya Janata Party. He is a member of the 18th Uttar Pradesh Assembly, representing the Purwa Assembly constituency.
