= Suresh Chandra Tiwari =

Indian politician

Suresh Chandra Tiwari सुरेश चन्द्र तिवारी

Member of Legislative Assembly
- In office 2019–2022
- Constituency: Lucknow Cantt.

Member of Legislative Assembly
- In office 1996–2012
- Constituency: Lucknow Cantt.

Personal details
- Born: 3 November 1956 (age 69) Lucknow, Uttar Pradesh, India
- Party: Bharatiya Janata Party
- Spouse: Archana Tiwari
- Children: Two sons, one daughter
- Education: Graduate
- Profession: Politics, Teaching

Suresh Chandra Tiwari (Hindi: सुरेश चंद्र तिवारी; born 3 November 1956) is an Indian politician and former MLA from Lucknow Cantonment constituency. He is formerpresident of the Bharatiya Janata Party (BJP) (Awadh Region).

== Career ==
Tiwari has been elected from BJP in 1996, 2002 and 2007. He was defeated in 2012 by Rita Bahuguna Joshi and then won again in 2019.
