= Pankaj Gupta (politician) =

Member of the Uttar Pradesh Legislative Assembly

Member of Uttar Pradesh Legislative Assembly
- Incumbent
- Assumed office March 2014
- Preceded by: Deepak Kumar
- Constituency: Unnao

Personal details
- Born: 9 September 1970 (age 55) Unnao, Uttar Pradesh
- Party: Bharatiya Janata Party
- Profession: Politician
- Website: pankajguptabjp.com

Pankaj Gupta is an Indian politician and a member of the 18th Uttar Pradesh Assembly from the Unnao Assembly constituency of the Unnao district. He is a member of the Bharatiya Janata Party.

== Early life ==
Pankaj Gupta was born on 9 September 1970 in Unnao, Uttar Pradesh, to a Hindu family of Kanhaiya Lal Gupta.

== Development Initiative ==
Gupta has been active in promoting social welfare and development in his constituency:

- He is the patron of the Sw. Kanhaiyalal Educational Society, which operates a free sewing and education center for women in Ghoghi since 2014.
- He has personally funded the cleaning of the Barkota Drain and Jail Drain to improve sanitation in the area.

== Posts held ==
#	From	To	Position	Ref
01	March 2017	March 2022	Member, 17th Uttar Pradesh Assembly	
02	March 2022	Incumbent	Member, 18th Uttar Pradesh Assembly	

== See also ==
- 18th Uttar Pradesh Assembly
- Unnao Assembly constituency
- Uttar Pradesh Legislative Assembly
