= Ashutosh Shukla =

Indian politician

Member of the Uttar Pradesh Legislative Assembly
- Incumbent
- Assumed office 10 March 2022
- Constituency: Bhagwantnagar

Personal details
- Born: बैसवारा सेवक; 24 June 1966 (age 59)
- Citizenship: India
- Party: Bharatiya Janata Party
- Occupation: MLA
- Profession: Politician

Ashutosh Shukla is an Indian politician of the Bharatiya Janata Party. He is a member of the 18th Uttar Pradesh Assembly, representing the Bhagwantnagar Assembly constituency.

== Early life and education ==
Ashutosh Shukla was born in Unnao district, Uttar Pradesh to the family of Suryanarayan Shukla in 1966.

He completed his Master of Arts in Political Science Honors from DSN College, Kanpur University.
