= Unnao Municipal Council =

Unnao Municipal Council is municipal council of Indian city of Unnao. The municipality came into existence in 1869 with District Magistrate as its chairman.
