= Kuldeep Singh Sengar =

Indian criminal and politician

Member (MLA) of Uttar Pradesh Legislative Assembly
- In office 2017–2019
- Preceded by: Badlu Khan
- Succeeded by: Shrikant Katiyar
- Constituency: Bangarmau
- In office 2012–2017
- Preceded by: Kripa Shankar Singh
- Succeeded by: Hriday Narayan Dikshit
- Constituency: Bhagwant Nagar
- In office 2007–2012
- Preceded by: Ram Shanker
- Succeeded by: Badlu Khan
- Constituency: Bangarmau
- In office 2002–2007
- Preceded by: Ram Kumar
- Succeeded by: Deepak Kumar
- Constituency: Unnao

Personal details
- Born: 20 March 1966 (age 60) Fatehpur, Uttar Pradesh, India
- Party: Bharatiya Janta Party (2017–2019)
- Other political affiliations: Samajwadi Party (2007–2017); Bahujan Samaj Party (2002–2007); Indian National Congress (till 2002)
- Occupation: Politician

Kuldeep Singh Sengar is an Indian politician and former member of the Uttar Pradesh Legislative Assembly, serving Bharatiya Janata Party, formerly belonging to the Bahujan Samaj Party, Samajwadi Party and Congress from Unnao district, Uttar Pradesh who has been expelled by BJP and convicted of rape, murder, attempt to murder, criminal conspiracy and criminal intimidation. He was the main defendant in the Unnao rape case and was booked under the POCSO Act. He was also accused of killing three people, including the victim's father in police custody and later her aunts by a conspired truck accident. A Delhi District and Sessions Court upheld an investigation conducted by the Central Bureau of Investigation (CBI) that had ruled out any foul play in the Unnao rape survivor's accident in 2019.

== Political career ==
Sengar started his political career with Indian National Congress (INC) in the early 1990s. In 2002, he was a Bahujan Samaj Party (BSP) candidate, winning the election from Unnao with 24% of the votes. It was the first time BSP won that seat. After being expelled from BSP due to alleged anti-party activities, he joined Samajwadi party and won a seat from Bangermau in 2007 (28% of the votes) and Bhagwant Nagar in 2012 (33% of the votes). In 2015, Kuldeep Singh's wife Sangeeta Singh won the election of District Panchayat chief as an Independent against Samajwadi Party after which the party had estrangement with him and started seeing him as a rebel. He joined Bharatiya Janata Party in 2017 to contest the elections. He won the election from Bangermau, a seat BJP has never won before, with 43% of the votes polled. He had held this seat earlier under Samajwadi Party (2007–2012). He has won 4 legislative elections from Unnao region on three different party tickets and has won every time.

== Rape, attempted murder, murder charge, arrest, expulsion ==
=== Rape charges ===
Sengar raped a 16-year-old girl in Unnao, when she approached him asking for a job on 4 June 2017. On 13 April 2018, he was taken in by the Central Bureau of Investigation (CBI) for questioning. The Allahabad High Court took suo moto cognizance of the case and ordered his immediate arrest by the CBI. First Information Reports (FIR) were lodged and Sengar was held in judicial custody for a week. The CBI corroborated the victim's charge of rape. Sengar was booked under 4 sections of the Indian Penal Code and Protection of Children from Sexual Offences. In December 2019, he was convicted of kidnapping and raping a minor.

=== Murder and attempt to murder charges ===
On 28 July 2019, two of the victim's aunts were killed, and the victim and her lawyer critically injured, when a truck rammed the car they were travelling in. Sengar has been booked for murder, attempt to murder, criminal conspiracy, and criminal intimidation. The police FIR lists 10 persons including Sengar's brother Manoj Singh Sengar, Sashi Singh and his aides.

=== Expulsion from BJP ===
Sengar was suspended from the BJP political party following the rape. In a statement, the State BJP president Swatantra Dev Singh said "Sengar was suspended by the party earlier and there is no change in his status. There is no change in the position of the party and the government, which is standing with the victim of the Unnao (rape) case." The demand for his expulsion from the ruling BJP grew, led by Congress Party leader Priyanka Gandhi and later joined in by other opposition party leaders.

In August 2019, after facing massive public and political outrage, the state and the Centre led BJP government finally expelled him from the party. The suspension and later expulsion did not automatically disqualify him as a legislator. He is not a part of any legislative committee.

=== Release from jail ===
On 23 December 2025, Kuldeep's sentence was suspended by the Delhi High Court, which stated that he had already served seven years and five months in prison. This was subject to protests and pleas from the victim's mother and other activists. His release order was suspended by the Supreme Court of India on 29 December while it heard the case.

== Previous criminal activities ==
Disobedience to order duly promulgated by public servant (IPC Section-188).

Assault or criminal force to deter public servant from discharge of his duty (IPC Section-353): Police Station- Hasanganj Dist. Unnao, U.P.

== Electoral history ==
Kuldeep Singh Sengar has been elected 4 times as MLA.

#	From	To	Position	Party
1.	2002	2007	MLA (1st term) from Unnao	BSP
2.	2007	2012	MLA (2nd term) from Bangarmau	Samajwadi Party
3.	2012	2017	MLA (3rd term) from Bhagwant Nagar	Samajwadi Party
4.	2017	2019	MLA (4th term) from Bangarmau	BJP

== See also ==
- Unnao rape case
- Kathua rape case
- 2019 Hyderabad gang rape
