= Bhagwant Nagar =

- town
- Location in Uttar Pradesh, India Bhagwant Nagar (India)
- Coordinates: 26.233°N 80.75°E
- Country: India
- State: Uttar Pradesh
- District: Unnao

Population (2011)
  - Total: 30,000

Languages
  - Official: Hindi
- Time zone: UTC+5:30 (IST)
- Vehicle registration: UP
- Website: up.gov.in

Bhagwant Nagar is a town, Vidhan Sabha seat and a nagar panchayat in Unnao district in the state of Uttar Pradesh, India.

== Demographics ==
As of 2011 India census, Bhagwant Nagar had a population of 30,000. Males constitute 53% of the population and females 47%. Bhagwant Nagar has an average literacy rate of 58%, lower than the national average of 59.5%; with 60% of the males and 40% of the females literate. 14% of the population is under 6 years of age.
