= Vishwambhar Dayalu Tripathi =

Indian lawyer and politician

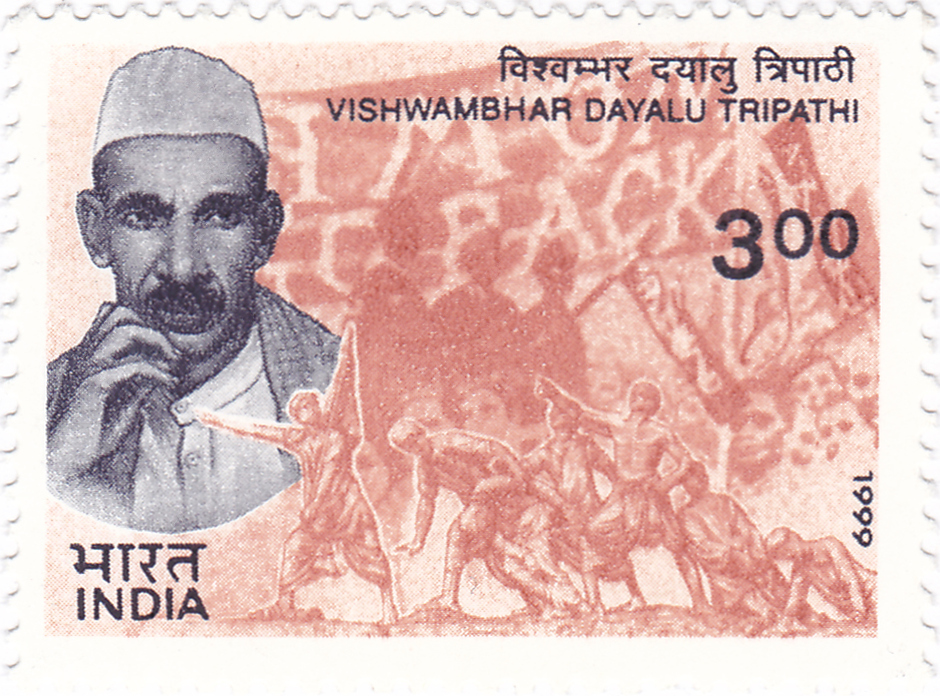
- Tripathi on a 1999 stamp of India

Member of Parliament, Lok Sabha
- In office 1952 - 1959

Personal details
- Born: 5 October 1899
- Died: 18 November 1959 (aged 60)
- Party: Indian National Congress
- Education: University of Lucknow

Vishwambhar Dayalu Tripathi (5 October 1899 – 18 November 1959) was an Indian lawyer and politician. He died in 1959 after being injected with penicillin from Hindustan Antibiotics at Pimpri.
