= Ziaur Rahman Ansari =

Indian politician

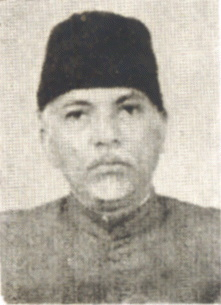

Member of Parliament, Lok Sabha
- In office 1971-1977
- Preceded by: Krishna Dev Tripathi
- Succeeded by: Raghavendra Singh
- In office 1980-1989
- Preceded by: Raghavendra Singh
- Succeeded by: Anwar Ahmad
- Constituency: Unnao, Uttar Pradesh

Personal details
- Born: 9 March 1925
- Died: 6 October 1992 (aged 67) New Delhi, India
- Party: Indian National Congress

Ziaur Rahman Ansari (9 March 1925 – 6 October 1992) was an Indian politician. He was elected to the Lok Sabha, the lower house of the Parliament of India from the Unnao constituency of Uttar Pradesh as a member of the Indian National Congress. Ansari, who was an Environment Minister in Rajiv Gandhi's cabinet, was accused of trying to molest an activist, Mukti Dutta, who had gone to meet him.
