= Unnao =

- City
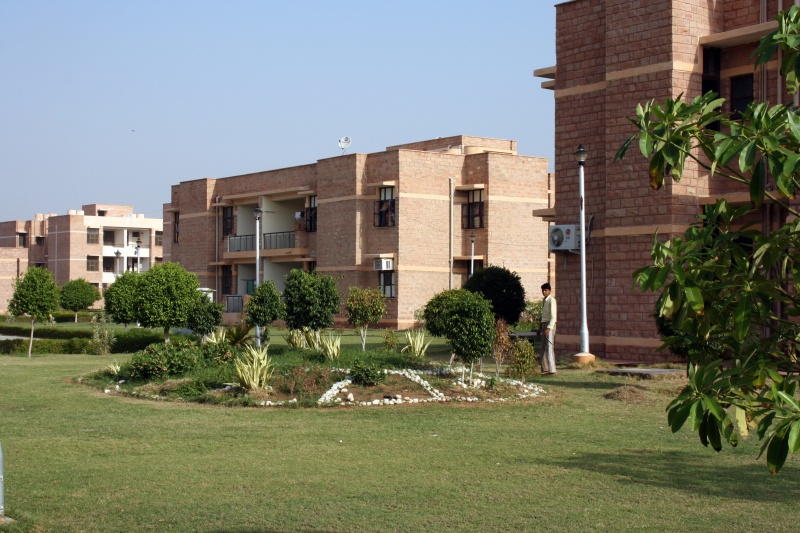
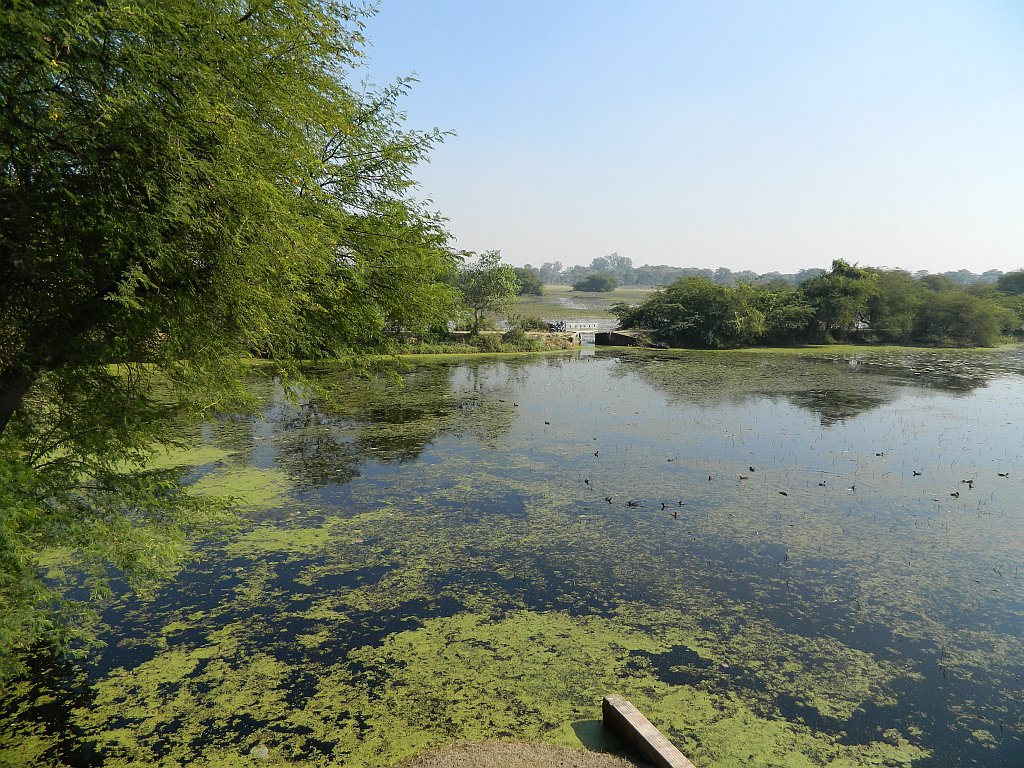
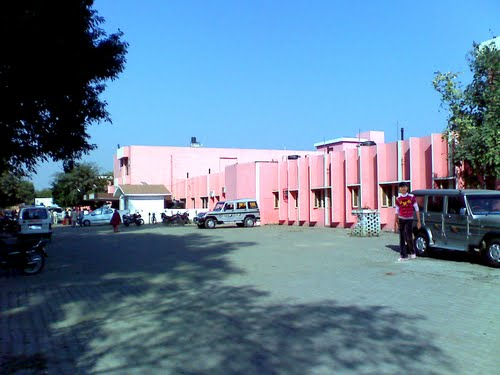
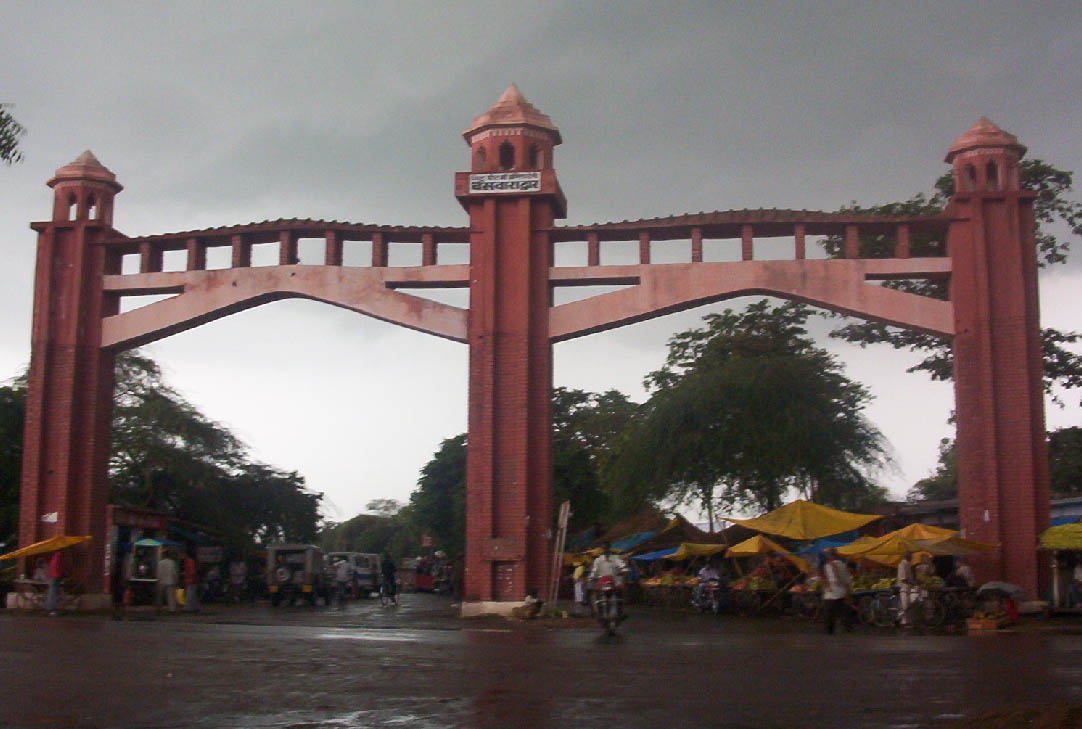
- Clockwise from top: Kanpur Institute of Management Studies on NH 25 in southern city, Unnao Hospital, Unnao Bypass Gate, Wetlands of Nawabganj Bird Sanctuary
- Nicknames: City of Lakes, Land of Pen and Sword
- Location in Uttar Pradesh, India
- Coordinates: 26.55°N 80.49°E
- Country: India
- State: Uttar Pradesh
- Division: Lucknow
- District: Unnao
- Founder: Unvant Rai Singh (उनवंत राय सिंह)
- Named for: Unvant Rai

Government
  - Type: Municipal corporation
  - Body: Unnao Municipal Corporation
  - Chairman of Municipality: Sweta Bhanu Mishra

Area
  - Total: 60 km^{2} (23 sq mi)
- Elevation: 123 m (404 ft)

Population (2011)
  - Total: 177,658
  - Density: 3,000/km^{2} (7,700/sq mi)
- Demonym: Unnaoites/Unnaovi

Languages
  - Official: Hindi, Urdu
  - Literacy: 66.37%
- Time zone: UTC+5:30 (IST)
- PIN: 209801
- Telephone code: 91-515
- Vehicle registration: UP-35
- Website: unnao.nic.in

Unnao is a city in the Indian state of Uttar Pradesh. Unnao is located on the eastern bank of the Ganges River, and it is a satellite city of Kanpur. Administratively, Unnao lies within the district of Unnao and is the headquarters of the Unnao Sadar subdivision. Unnao also falls the under Kanpur Metropolitan Development Authority.

The city is known for its leather, Zardozi and chemical industries. Unnao is a historical city with many historical buildings and structures. Trans Ganga City, a new satellite town of Unnao, is being developed in order to develop Unnao as an industrial and infrastructural hub as the region comes under Kanpur-Lucknow Counter Magnet Area. Unnao district is a part of the central Ganges Plain covering an area of 4558 km^{2}. The city is enlisted as a municipality of Kanpur metropolitan area and is the second largest city within the metropolitan area.

== History ==
The district is named after its capital, Unnao. About 900 years ago, the site of Unnao was covered with extensive forests. Godo Singh, a Chauhan Rajput, cleared the forests around the third quarter of the 12th century and founded a town called Sawai Godo. Shortly afterwards, it passed into the hands of the rulers of the Kannauj, who appointed Khande Singh as the Governor of the area. Unwant Rai Singh, a Bisen Rajput and a lieutenant of the Governor, killed him and built a fort here, renaming the place as Unnao after himself. Kavi Kalash, an advisor, commander and a close friend of Chhatrapati Sambhaji Maharaj, was born here.

After the First War of Indian Independence in 1857, power was transferred from the British East India Company to the British Crown by the Queen's Proclamation of 1858. Once the order was restored, the civil administration was re-established in the district which was named Unnao, with headquarters at Unnao. It assumed its present size in 1869. The same year, the town of Unnao was constituted as a municipality.

== Urban agglomeration ==
The Unnao urban agglomeration comprises the municipal limits of Unnao city and Shuklaganj, along with the villages of Unnao, including Adarsh Nagar, P.D. Nagar, Taki Nagar, Pitambar Nagar, and P.N Kheda, among others. Additionally, the rural areas of Deeh, Dostinagar, Turkmannagar, Ganjauli, and Dhaudhi Rautapur (among others) contribute to a total population of 303,224.

== Geography ==
=== Location and boundaries ===
The district is roughly a parallelogram in shape and is situated between latitudes 26°8' N and 27°2' N, and longitudes 80°3' E and 81°3' E. It is bordered by Hardoi district to the North, Lucknow district to the East, Rae Bareli district to the South, and the Ganga River to the west, which separates it from the districts of Kanpur and Fatehpur.

=== River systems and water resources ===
The Ganga, Kalyani, and Sai are the main rivers of the district. The Ganga forms the western and southern boundaries, while the Sai largely delineates the northern and eastern boundaries. Other significant rivers in the district include the Kalyani, Tanai, Loni, and Morahi (Naurahi), all of which are tributaries of the Ganga. Although these rivers tend to run dry during the hot weather, they typically hold water for most of the year and are used for irrigation purposes.

==== Ganga ====
The only great river of the district is the Ganga, which first touches the district near the village of Purwa Gahir, in pargana Bangarmau, and flows southeastward, acting as a boundary between the districts of Kanpur and Fatehpur. While its general flow direction is from northwest to southeast, the river takes several sharp bends, notably near Umriya Bhagwantpur, Rustampur in tehsil Safipur, Rautapur in tehsil Unnao, and Ratua Khera and Duli Khera in tehsil Purwa. Near Baksar, the Ganga is joined by the Morahi river, flowing close to its old high bank, before leaving the district shortly after Baksar.

The river is not extensively utilized as a waterway or for irrigation purposes. While there are several ferries for pedestrians and pilgrims, none of them can be considered a significant trade route. The river's high banks generally prevent its use for irrigation, but some of its small drainage channels or sotas, which form islands in certain parganas, are occasionally used to irrigate crops in low-lying alluvial lands. Cultivated lands are often located far from the river and cannot be easily irrigated from it. The water from the river would need to pass through the sandy banks, leading to significant loss or absorption. The main channel of the river experiences constant changes, resulting in shifting cultivation practices in its immediate vicinity.

It appears from its old high bank that the river has a general tendency to shift its course to the west. In the days of Akbar, the river skirted the village of Ghatampur but has since then so altered its course that it now runs about 8 km to the southwest of the village.

==== Lakes ====
The larger lakes of the district, which hold water all the year round, are the Kundra Samundar near Jhalotar, the lake near Nawabganj, the lake near Kantha and the long chain of lakes in pargana Mauranwan. In Tehsil Safipur, the more important lakes are those at Mawai-Bhari and Kursat and the Harial Tal near Mustafabad. In Tehsil Hasanganj, besides the Kundra Samundar at Mawai, there are the Kulli Bani and Jalesar lakes near Ajgain and the chain of lakes called Basaha, travelling a distance of 96 km in the district and eventually leaving it for district Rae Bareli where it is reckoned as a tributary of the river Sai. The Katgari Lake near Asiwan is the western part of the tehsil with the stretches of water at Amarpur, Sambha, Sheothana, Marenda & Asakhera, but in its northern and eastern parts, there are only small and very shallow tanks which dry up when rainfall is deficient. In Tehsil Unnao there are no important lakes, instead a number of very shallow depressions, which get filled up with water during the rains and yield excellent crops of rice.

In Tehsil Purwa there are many lakes, situated in a well-defined belt stretching along the whole length of the tehsil. The main among them are the lakes at Kantha, Bhadain, Unchagaon, Qila, Akhori, Miri, Zorawarganj and Sarwan. The Barhna tank near Sagauli, the Mohan and Sukrar lakes near Mauranwan, and several others, like the Bharda lake, skirt around the district Rae Bareli. Besides these, there are the tanks at Sahrawan, the Bhundi tank at Gulariha, and the Kumbha tank at Bhagwantnagar. The lakes at Kantha, Sagauli, and Barela contain water all the year round, while the others generally provide irrigation for the Rabi crops only, drying up in the years of drought.

=== Geology ===
Geologically the district forms part of the vast Indo-Gangetic alluvial tract, of which the origin is attributed to a sag in the Earth's crust, formed, in the upper eocene times, between the northwardly drifting Gondwanaland and the rising Himalayan belt, and gradually filled in by sediments so as to constitute a level plane with a very gentle seaward slope. The alluvium formation of the district, comprising sand, silt and clay with occasional gravel, is of the early quaternary to sub-recent age. The older alluvium called bhangar forms slightly elevated terraces usually above the flood levels. It is rather dark in colour and generally rich in concretions and nodules of impure calcium carbonate, locally known as kankar. The newer alluvium, called khandar, forming the lowlands between the Ganga and Bhangar, is light coloured, poor in calcareous contain and composed of lenticular beds of sand, gravel and clays. The economic minerals found in the district are kankar, reh and sand.

=== Topology ===
Unnao lies in the great plains of the Ganges and hence the land is highly fertile. The soil is mostly alluvial. The Ganges separates Unnao from Kanpur district. The district is bounded by river Ganges in the west and the river Sai in the east. The entire district falling in Sai Sub-basin of the Ganges basin represents flat topography. The irrigation in the district takes place through Sharda Canal network system and tubewells. About 92% of the district area is under cultivation. The district has a subtropical climate. The district is mainly drained by the river Ganges and its tributaries Kalyani, Khar, Loni and Marahai in the western part of the district, and by Sai river in the eastern part of the district. All these rivers are perennial in nature. About 87% of the area of the net sown area (300,000 hectares) is irrigated both by surface water (Sharda Canal network system) and ground water through shallow and moderately deep tubewells. The share of surface water irrigation is 48% while that of ground water is 52%. The economy of the district mainly depends on agriculture.

=== Climate ===
Climate data for Unnao
Month	Jan	Feb	Mar	Apr	May	Jun	Jul	Aug	Sep	Oct	Nov	Dec	Year
Record high °C (°F)	28 (82)	32 (90)	40 (104)	44 (111)	46 (115)	48 (118)	41 (106)	38 (100)	38 (100)	36 (97)	32 (90)	28 (82)	48 (118)
Mean daily maximum °C (°F)	18 (64)	24 (75)	29 (84)	35 (95)	40 (104)	41 (106)	35 (95)	34 (93)	32 (90)	30 (86)	25 (77)	20 (68)	33 (91)
Mean daily minimum °C (°F)	6 (43)	12 (54)	14 (57)	20 (68)	22 (72)	25 (77)	26 (79)	23 (73)	22 (72)	16 (61)	12 (54)	7 (45)	15 (59)
Record low °C (°F)	−3 (27)	6 (43)	7 (45)	15 (59)	17 (63)	20 (68)	21 (70)	18 (64)	19 (66)	15 (59)	9 (48)	0 (32)	−3 (27)
Average precipitation mm (inches)	23 (0.9)	16 (0.6)	9 (0.4)	5 (0.2)	6 (0.2)	68 (2.7)	208 (8.2)	286 (11.3)	202 (8.0)	43 (1.7)	7 (0.3)	8 (0.3)	881 (34.7)

=== Surrounding towns ===
Unnao district is surrounded by some of the main cities of Uttar Pradesh – Lucknow, Kanpur, Raebareli and Hardoi.

== Healthcare ==
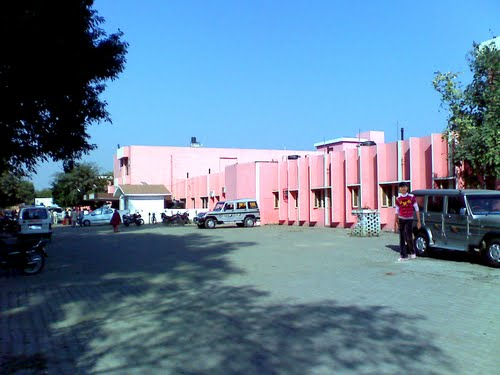
Unnao City Government Hospital

Unnao's hospital serves patients from nearby villages. The Uma Shankar Dikshit hospital is a government-run hospital located in A.B. Nagar near Ram Lila Ground. Another government hospital, which serves women, is located near the Unnao railway station. A medical college in the city is proposed. Trauma Center is proposed in government hospital.

There are 538 government health care facilities in the district, as can be seen from the table given below:

Category of Hospitals	Number of Hospital Available
District Hospital	1
Community Health Center	1
Primary Health Center	1
Additional Primary Health Center	4
Sub - Center	1
Female Hospitals	1
Ayurvedic Hospitals	4
Advanced Homoeopathic clinic priyadarshini nagar	1
Urban Health Post / Maternity Centers	1
Any Other Govt. Health Training Institute	1

== Economy ==
Tanning is the biggest industry in Unnao. Unnao is known for its leather industry and leather goods. Banthar Leather Technology Park, Magarwara Industrial area and Unnao Industrial area are major industrial suburbs of Unnao. Unnao is known for printing & dyeing lihaf (quilts) and mosquito net production. Major producers include Subhan Bux Usman Bux & Co., Aman Traders, Haq and Sons Dyeing and Printing company and other major producers include F.R Dyeing and Printing Works.

== Education ==
The city contains engineering colleges, several medical colleges, and management institutes. Saraswati Vidya Mandir D. S. N. College is the only government college in Unnao for higher studies. Engineering colleges are approved by AICTE and affiliated to Dr. A. P. J. Abdul Kalam Technical University, Lucknow. Saraswati Medical College is the only college available for higher medical education. The majority of the schools are affiliated to Uttar Pradesh Board but there are some that have affiliations to ICSE-ISC and CBSE.

== Transport ==
=== Rail ===
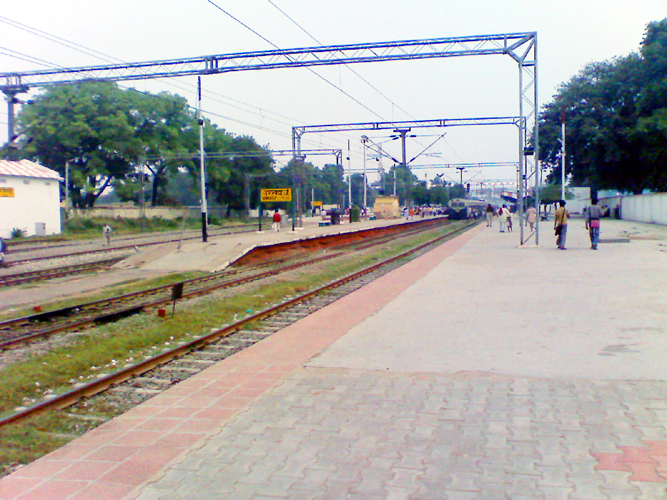
Unnao Railway Station

Unnao is seamlessly connected to Indian Railways. Unnao railway station is the junction point for Rae Bareli, Unchahar, Kunda Harnamganj, Prayag, Allahabad, Hardoi, Balamau situated at Lucknow-Kanpur stretch. Trains for major cities like Agra, Ahmedabad, Bangalore, Bhopal, Nagpur, Vijaywada, Chennai, Coimbatore, Palakkad, Bhubaneswar, Bhadrak, Cuttak, Chennai, Chandigarh, Chitrakoot, Cochin, Delhi, Gorakhpur, Ernakulam, Hyderabad, Jaipur, Jammu Tawi, Jhansi, Jalandhar, Amritsar, Panipat, Gorakhpur, Gwalior, Darbhanga, Kota, Mumbai, Nagpur, Patna, Puri, Surat, Trivandrum, Vadodara, Ujjain, Varanasi, Vadodara, can be boarded here. The railway stations in Unnao Urban Agglomeration are:-

- Unnao Railway Station- This is the major junction railway station in the city of Unnao and is connected to major cities of India with many express/mail trains.
- Magarwara Railway Station-This is a passenger/EMU train station in the industrial suburb of Magarwara.
- Sonik Railway Station-This is a railway station towards East of Unnao city near UPSIDC Industrial Area and has only passenger/EMU trains stoppage.
- Kanpur Bridge Left Bank Station- This is a station within the municipal limits of Shuklaganj, the twin city of Unnao and has only passenger/EMU stoppage.

=== Kanpur Lucknow High Speed Railway ===
Unnao will be the only railway station between Kanpur and Lucknow of the planned high speed railways.

=== Road ===
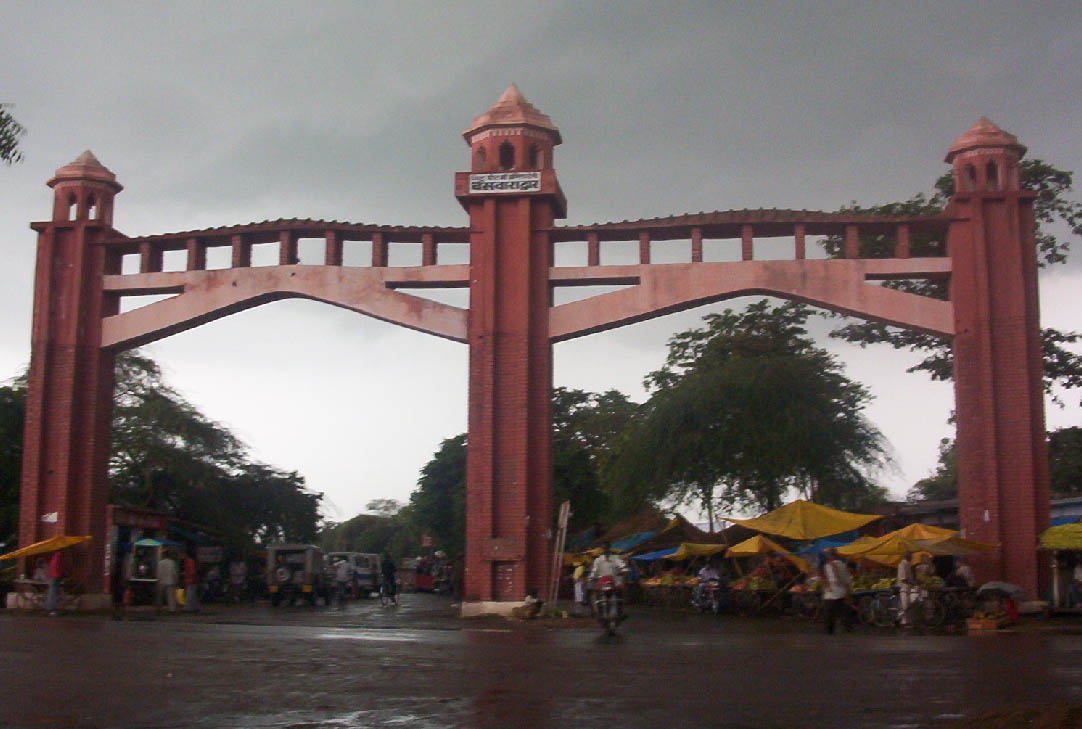
Unnao Bypass Gate near Nirala Nagar

Unnao is the only district of Uttar Pradesh through which three Expressways pass First Ganga Expressway (Meerut To Prayagraj) passes through Unnao City, Second Agra Lucknow Expressway Passes through Unnao District, Third Lucknow–Kanpur Expressway Passes through Unnao City.

The major national highway NH 25 passes through Unnao which has bypass from Unnao. The State Highway which is 78 km encompasses Unnao is in good condition. Agra–Lucknow Expressway India's longest access-controlled expressway passes through Unnao district. It is a six lane expressway. Ganga Expressway will also pass through Unnao which will enhance connectivity with national capital.

=== Air ===
The nearest airport is Kanpur Airport towards west (approx. 25 km) and Lucknow Airport towards east (approx. 50 km)

== Notable people ==
Unnao has been known as the land of pen (kalam) and sword (talwaar). It has been the land of Progressive Hindi writers, freedom fighters, educationists etc.

- Suryakant Tripathi 'Nirala'
- Chandrashekhar Azad
- Maulana Hasrat Mohani
- Kavi Kalash
- Christine Weston
- Hussain Ahmad Madani
- Sarvadaman D. Banerjee
- Bhagwati Charan Verma
- Shivmangal Singh 'Suman'
- Vishwambhar Dayal Tripathi
- Ram Vilas Sharma
- Dwarka Prasad Mishra
- Gulab Singh Lodhi
- Deepak Tripathi
- Ram Baksh Singh
- Hriday Narayan Dikshit
- Ziaur Rahman Ansari, union minister
- Uma Shankar Dikshit
- Sheila Dikshit, former Chief Minister of Delhi, daughter in law of Uma Shankar Dikshit
- Onkar Singh, Former Vice Chancellor of Veer Madho Singh Bhandari Uttarakhand Technical University, Dehradun and Founder Vice Chancellor of Madan Mohan Malaviya University of Technology, Gorakhpur
- Vishal Mishra, music director and singer
- Annu Tandon, former Member of Parliament
- Kuldeep Yadav, Indian international Cricketer
