= History of the Uttarakhand Legislative Assembly =

The Uttarakhand Legislative Assembly, also known as the Uttarakhand Vidhan Sabha, is a unicameral governing and law making body of Uttarakhand, one of the 28 states of India. It is seated at Dehradun, the winter capital, and Gairsain, the summer capital of Uttarakhand. The total strength of the assembly is 70 Members of the Legislative Assembly (MLA).

== Seats ==
Between 2002 and 2020, Uttarakhand Legislative Assembly had 71 seats, including one reserved seat for the member of Anglo-Indian community that was abolished on 25 January 2020 by the 104th Constitutional Amendment Act, 2019, reducing the strength of Assembly from 71 to 70 seats.

== 2016 Assembly suspension ==
Starting March 2016, Indian state of Uttarakhand underwent a political crisis. The Indian National Congress Chief Minister Harish Rawat replaced Vijay Bahuguna as the Chief Minister of Uttarakhand on 2014. After a political crisis in 2016, the President's rule was imposed ending his tenure as the Chief Minister when 9 rebel Congress MLAs withdrew their support to the Harish Rawat government. On 13 July 2016, Uttarakhand High Court lifted the President's rule and reinstated the Harish Rawat government. Next day the Supreme Court of India stayed the High Court's order and the President's rule was imposed again that lasted till May. In May, Harish Rawat government was once again reinstalled and the rebel MLAs were suspended by the Speaker on the grounds of defection.

== Electionwise composition of Assembly ==
Uttarakhand Legislative Assembly year-wise election results
Party	Year				
Party	2022 Elections	2017 Elections	2012 Elections	2007 Elections	2002 Elections
Bahujan Samaj Party	02	–	03	08	07
Bharatiya Janata Party	47	57	31	35	19
Indian National Congress	19	11	32	21	36
Nationalist Congress Party	–	–	–	–	01
Uttarakhand Kranti Dal^{[A]}	–	–	01	03	04
Independent	02	02	03	03	03
Total Seats	70	70	70	70	70

=== List of Assemblies ===
The following is the list of all the Uttarakhand Legislative Assemblies

Assembly	Election Year	Speaker	Chief Minister	Party	Opposition Leader	Party
Interim Uttaranchal Assembly	N/A	Prakash Pant	Nityanand Swami (2000–01)	Bharatiya; Janata; Party	Vacant	N/A
Interim Uttaranchal Assembly	N/A	Prakash Pant	Bhagat Singh Koshyari (2001–02)	Bharatiya; Janata; Party	Vacant	N/A
1st Assembly	2002	Yashpal Arya	Narayan Datt Tiwari	Indian; National; Congress	Bhagat Singh Koshyari (2002–03)	Bharatiya; Janata; Party
1st Assembly	2002	Yashpal Arya	Narayan Datt Tiwari	Indian; National; Congress	Matbar Singh Kandari (2003–07)	Bharatiya; Janata; Party
2nd Assembly	2007	Harbans Kapoor	Bhuwan Chandra Khanduri (2007–09)	Bharatiya; Janata; Party	Harak Singh Rawat	Indian; National; Congress
2nd Assembly	2007	Harbans Kapoor	Ramesh Pokhriyal (2009–11)	Bharatiya; Janata; Party	Harak Singh Rawat	Indian; National; Congress
2nd Assembly	2007	Harbans Kapoor	Bhuwan Chandra Khanduri (2011–12)	Bharatiya; Janata; Party	Harak Singh Rawat	Indian; National; Congress
3rd Assembly	2012	Govind Singh Kunjwal	Vijay Bahuguna (2012–14)	Indian; National; Congress	Ajay Bhatt	Bharatiya; Janata; Party
3rd Assembly	2012	Govind Singh Kunjwal	Harish Rawat (2014–17)	Indian; National; Congress	Ajay Bhatt	Bharatiya; Janata; Party
4th Assembly	2017	Premchand Aggarwal	Trivendra Singh Rawat (2017–21)	Bharatiya; Janata; Party	Indira Hridayesh (2017–21)	Indian; National; Congress
4th Assembly	2017	Premchand Aggarwal	Tirath Singh Rawat (2021)	Bharatiya; Janata; Party	Indira Hridayesh (2017–21)	Indian; National; Congress
4th Assembly	2017	Premchand Aggarwal	Pushkar Singh Dhami	Bharatiya; Janata; Party	Pritam Singh (2021–22)	Indian; National; Congress
5th Assembly	2022	Ritu Khanduri Bhushan	Pushkar Singh Dhami	Bharatiya; Janata; Party	Yashpal Arya	Indian; National; Congress

== Notes ==
- ^{A} In the 2012 Assembly election, Uttarakhand Kranti Dal contested as "Uttarakhand Kranti Dal (P)" led by then party president Trivendra Singh Panwar. The original party name and the election symbol (chair) were seized by the Election Commission of India following the factionism and leadership dispute within the party that led to its break-up. Its original name and party symbol were restored in 2017.

== See also ==
- List of speakers of the Uttarakhand Legislative Assembly
- List of chief ministers of Uttarakhand
- List of Uttarakhand ministries
- List of leaders of the opposition in the Uttarakhand Legislative Assembly
