= Swami ministry =

- 1st Ministry of Uttaranchal
- Date formed: 9 November 2000
- Date dissolved: 29 October 2001

People and organisations
- Head of state: Surjit Singh Barnala
- Head of government: Nityanand Swami
- Member parties: Bharatiya Janata Party
- Status in legislature: Majority

History
- Election: Interim Uttaranchal Assembly
- Successor: Koshyari ministry

The Nityanand Swami ministry was the Cabinet of Uttaranchal headed by the Chief Minister of Uttaranchal, Nityanand Swami from 2000 to 2001.

== Council of Ministers ==
Name	Office	Portfolio	Took Office	Left Office	Party
Bhagat Singh Koshyari	Cabinet Minister	Energy, Parliamentary Affairs, Irrigation	9 November 2000	29 October 2001	BJP
Ramesh Pokhriyal	Cabinet Minister	Finance, Rural Development, Medical Education, Planning, Revenue, Drinking Water, Trade Tax	9 November 2000	29 October 2001	BJP
Kedar Singh Phonia	Cabinet Minister	Not specified	9 November 2000	29 October 2001	BJP
Ajay Bhatt	Cabinet Minister	Not specified	9 November 2000	29 October 2001	BJP
Matbar Singh Kandari	Cabinet Minister	Forest	9 November 2000	29 October 2001	BJP
Mohan Singh Rawat	Cabinet Minister	Not specified	9 November 2000	29 October 2001	BJP
Banshidhar Bhagat	Cabinet Minister	Agriculture, Cooperatives, Animal Husbandry, Fisheries, Milk Development, Sugar Mill, Sugarcane Development	9 November 2000	29 October 2001	BJP
Narayan Ram Das	Minister of State	Not specified	9 November 2000	29 October 2001	BJP
Narayan Singh Rana	Minister of State	Not specified	9 November 2000	29 October 2001	BJP
Suresh Chand Arya	Minister of State	Transport	9 November 2000	29 October 2001	BJP
Tirath Singh Rawat	Minister of State	Education, Jail and Census	9 November 2000	29 October 2001	BJP
Nirupama Gaur	Minister of State	Not specified	9 November 2000	29 October 2001	BJP
