= List of ministers of finance of Uttarakhand =

== List of Finance Ministers of Uttarakhand ==
This is a list of finance ministers of Uttarakhand; which function as heads of the Indian state of Uttarakhand's Ministry of Finance and members of the Uttarakhand government's cabinet.

No.	Name (birth–death)	Portrait	Party	Term		Assembly (Election)	Chief Minister
1	Ramesh Pokhriyal (born 1959)		Bharatiya Janata Party	2000	2001	Interim Uttaranchal Assembly	Nityanand Swami
1	Ramesh Pokhriyal (born 1959)		Bharatiya Janata Party	2001	2002	Interim Uttaranchal Assembly	Bhagat Singh Koshyari
2	Narayan Datt Tiwari (1925–2018)		Indian National Congress	2002	2007	1st Assembly (2002 election)	Narayan Datt Tiwari
3	Bhuwan Chandra Khanduri (1934–2026)		Bharatiya Janata Party	2007	2009	2nd Assembly (2007 election)	Bhuwan Chandra Khanduri
(1)	Ramesh Pokhriyal (born 1959)		Bharatiya Janata Party	2009	2011	2nd Assembly (2007 election)	Ramesh Pokhriyal
(3)	Bhuwan Chandra Khanduri (1934–2026)		Bharatiya Janata Party	2011	2012	2nd Assembly (2007 election)	Bhuwan Chandra Khanduri
4	Vijay Bahuguna (born 1947)		Indian National Congress	13 March 2012	31 March 2012	3rd Assembly (2012 election)	Vijay Bahuguna
5	Indira Hridayesh (1941–2021)		Indian National Congress	1 April 2012	31 January 2014	3rd Assembly (2012 election)	Vijay Bahuguna
6	Harish Rawat (born 1948)		Indian National Congress	1 February 2014	3 March 2014	3rd Assembly (2012 election)	Harish Rawat
(5)	Indira Hridayesh (1941–2021)		Indian National Congress	4 March 2014	18 March 2017	3rd Assembly (2012 election)	Harish Rawat
7	Prakash Pant (1960–2019)		Bharatiya Janata Party	18 March 2017	5 June 2019	4th Assembly (2017 election)	Trivendra Singh Rawat
8	Trivendra Singh Rawat (born 1960)		Bharatiya Janata Party	5 June 2019	10 March 2021	4th Assembly (2017 election)	Trivendra Singh Rawat
9	Tirath Singh Rawat (born 1964)		Bharatiya Janata Party	10 March 2021	4 July 2021	4th Assembly (2017 election)	Tirath Singh Rawat
10	Pushkar Singh Dhami (born 1975)		Bharatiya Janata Party	4 July 2021	23 March 2022	4th Assembly (2017 election)	Pushkar Singh Dhami
11	Premchand Aggarwal (born 1961)		Bharatiya Janata Party	23 March 2022	17 March 2025	5th Assembly (2022 election)	Pushkar Singh Dhami
(10)	Pushkar Singh Dhami (born 1975)		Bharatiya Janata Party	17 March 2025	Incumbent	5th Assembly (2022 election)	Pushkar Singh Dhami

== See also ==
- List of chief ministers of Uttarakhand
- Uttarakhand Council of Ministers
