= Interim Uttaranchal Assembly =

Assembly of Uttaranchal state in India from 2000 to 2002

Interim Uttaranchal Legislative Assembly Antarim Uttaranchal Vidhan Sabha
- Interim Assembly

Type
- Type: Unicameral
- Houses: Uttaranchal Legislative Assembly

History
- Founded: 9 November 2000
- Disbanded: 14 February 2002
- Succeeded by: 1st Uttarakhand Assembly

Leadership
- Speaker: Prakash Pant, BJP
- Leader of the House: Nityanand Swami (2000–2001), BJP; Bhagat Singh Koshyari (2001–2002), BJP
- Chief Secretary: Ajay Vikram Singh, IAS

Structure
- Seats: 30^{†}
- Political groups: Government (23): BJP (23); Opposition (7): SP (3); BSP (2); INC (2)
- Length of term: 2000–2002

Elections
- Voting system: first-past-the-post
- Redistricting: 1977

Meeting place
- Vidhan Bhavan, Dehradun, Uttaranchal

Website
- Uttarakhand Legislative Assembly

Constitution
- Constitution of India

Footnotes
- ^{†}Including 22 MLAs from the erstwhile Uttar Pradesh Legislative Assembly and 8 MLCs from the erstwhile Uttar Pradesh Legislative Council.

The Interim Uttaranchal Legislative Assembly also known as Antarim Uttaranchal Vidhan Sabha was a unicameral governing and law making body of the newly formed Indian state of Uttaranchal (later Uttarakhand). As a Provisional Uttaranchal Legislative Assembly it came into existence with the formation of the State of Uttaranchal at 9 November 2000 which was later succeeded by the 1st Uttarakhand Assembly with the first assembly election that took place on February 14th, 2002. It was at that time consisted with total 30 Members including 22 Members of the Legislative Assembly and 8 Members of the Legislative Council from the Legislative Assembly and Legislative Council of Uttar Pradesh, off which then Uttaranchal was formed out.

== Party position in the Assembly ==
Rank	Party	Abbr.	Seats	Leader in the House
1	Bharatiya Janata Party	BJP	23	Nityanand Swami (2000–2001); Bhagat Singh Koshyari (2001–2002)
2	Samajwadi Party	SP	03	Ambrish Kumar
3	Bahujan Samaj Party	BSP	02	Muhammad Muhiuddin
4	Indian National Congress	INC	02	Indira Hridayesh
	Total		30	

== Key post holders in the Assembly ==
- Speaker : Prakash Pant
- Deputy Speaker : Vacant
- Leader of the House: Nityanand Swami (2000–2001)
  Bhagat Singh Koshyari (2001–2002)
- Leader of the Opposition : Vacant
- Chief Secretary : Ajay Vikram Singh

== Members of the Interim Uttaranchal Assembly ==
S. No.	Constituency	Members	Party
Members of the Legislative Assembly
1	Uttarkashi (SC)	Gyan Chand	BJP
2	Tehri	Lakhiram Joshi	BJP
3	Devprayag	Matbar Singh Kandari	BJP
4	Lansdowne	Bharat Singh Rawat	BJP
5	Pauri	Mohan Singh Rawat	BJP
6	Karnaprayag	Dr. Ramesh Pokhriyal 'Nishank'	BJP
7	Badri–Kedar	Kedar Singh Phonia	BJP
8	Didihat	Bishan Singh Chuphal	BJP
9	Pithoragarh	Krishna Chandra Punetha	BJP
10	Almora	Raghunath Singh Chauhan	BJP
11	Bageshwar (SC)	Narayan Ram Das	BJP
12	Ranikhet	Ajay Bhatt	BJP
13	Nainital	Banshidhar Bhagat	BJP
14	Khatima (SC)	Suresh Chand Arya	BJP
15	Haldwani	Tilak Raj Behar	BJP
16	Kashipur	Karan Chand Singh Baba	INC
17	Roorkee	Ram Singh Saini	SP
18	Laksar	Muhammad Muhiuddin	BSP
19	Haridwar	Ambrish Kumar	SP
20	Mussoorie	Rajendra Singh	BJP
21	Dehradun	Harbans Kapoor	BJP
22	Chakrata (ST)	Munna Singh Chauhan	SP
Members of the Legislative Council
23	Garhwal–Kumaon Graduates	Nityanand Swami	BJP
24	Garhwal–Kumaon Teachers	Dr. Indira Hridayesh	INC
25	Garhwal Local Authorities	Tirath Singh Rawat	BJP
26	Kumaon Local Authorities	Prakash Pant	BJP
27	N/A	Bhagat Singh Koshyari	BJP
28	N/A	Isham Singh	BSP
29	N/A	Narayan Singh Rana	BJP
30	N/A	Nirupama Gaur	BJP

== See also ==
- Uttarakhand Legislative Assembly
- 2002 Uttaranchal Legislative Assembly election
- Swami ministry
- Koshyari ministry
- Politics of Uttarakhand
