= List of leaders of the opposition in the Uttarakhand Legislative Assembly =

Chairman of largest party who not belongs to government

Leader of the Opposition of the Uttarakhand Legislative Assembly
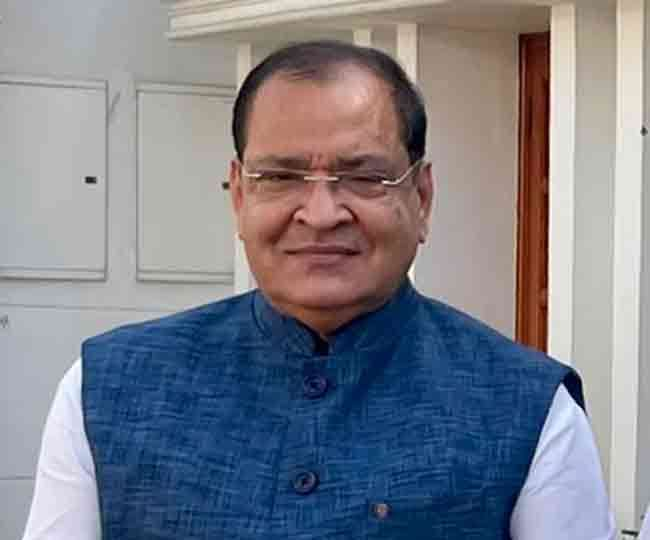
- Incumbent; Yashpal Arya since 10 April 2022
- Uttarakhand Legislative Assembly
- Abbreviation: LOP
- Appointer: Members of the Official Opposition in the Uttarakhand Legislative Assembly
- Term length: During the life of the Assembly (five years maximum); Renewable
- Precursor: List of leaders of the opposition in the Uttar Pradesh Legislative Assembly
- Inaugural holder: Bhagat Singh Koshyari (2002–2003)
- Formation: 9 December 2000; 25 years ago
- Website: Uttarakhand Legislative Assembly

The leader of the opposition in the Uttarakhand Legislative Assembly is the politician who leads the official opposition in the Uttarakhand Legislative Assembly.

== Eligibility ==
Official Opposition is a term used in Uttarakhand Legislative Assembly to designate the political party which has secured the second largest number of seats in the assembly. In order to get formal recognition, the party must have at least 10% of total membership of the Legislative Assembly. A single party has to meet the 10% seat criterion, not an alliance. Many of the other Indian state legislatures also follow this 10% rule while the rest of them prefer single largest opposition party according to the rules of their respective houses.

== Role ==
The opposition's main role is to question the government of the day and hold them accountable to the public. The opposition is equally responsible in upholding the best interests of the people of the country. They have to ensure that the Government does not take any steps, which might have negative effects on the people of the country.

The role of the opposition in legislature is basically to check the excesses of the ruling or dominant party, and not to be totally antagonistic. There are actions of the ruling party which may be beneficial to the masses and opposition is expected to support such steps.

In legislature, opposition party has a major role and must act to discourage the party in power from acting against the interests of the country and the common man. They are expected to alert the population and the Government on the content of any bill, which is not in the best interests of the country.

== List of leaders of the opposition of Uttarakhand ==
| No | Portrait | Name | Constituency | Term | | | Assembly (Election) | Chief Minister | Party |
|---|---|---|---|---|---|---|---|---|---|
| – | | Vacant | N/A | 9 November 2000 | 13 March 2002 | 1 year, 124 days | Interim Uttaranchal Assembly | Nityanand Swami; Bhagat Singh Koshyari | N/A |
| 1 | | Bhagat Singh Koshyari | Kapkot | 13 March 2002 | 17 December 2003 | 1 year, 279 days | 1st (2002) | Narayan Datt Tiwari | Bharatiya Janata Party |
| 2 | | Matbar Singh Kandari | Rudraprayag | 17 December 2003 | 2 March 2007 | 3 years, 75 days | 1st (2002) | Narayan Datt Tiwari | Bharatiya Janata Party |
| 3 | | Harak Singh Rawat | Lansdowne | 13 March 2007 | 9 March 2012 | 4 years, 362 days | 2nd (2007) | B. C. Khanduri; Ramesh Pokhriyal | Indian National Congress |
| 4 | | Ajay Bhatt | Ranikhet | 19 May 2012 | 14 March 2017 | 4 years, 299 days | 3rd (2012) | Vijay Bahuguna; Harish Rawat | Bharatiya Janata Party |
| 5 | | Indira Hridayesh | Haldwani | 27 March 2017 | 13 June 2021† | 4 years, 78 days | 4th (2017) | Trivendra Singh Rawat; Tirath Singh Rawat | Indian National Congress |
| 6 | | Pritam Singh | Chakrata | 23 July 2021 | 11 March 2022 | 231 days | 4th (2017) | Pushkar Singh Dhami | Indian National Congress |
| 7 | | Yashpal Arya | Bajpur | 10 April 2022 | Incumbent | 4 years, 150 days | 5th (2022) | Pushkar Singh Dhami | Indian National Congress |

== See also ==
- Government of Uttarakhand
- Governor of Uttarakhand
- Chief Minister of Uttarakhand
- Uttarakhand Legislative Assembly
- Speaker of the Uttarakhand Legislative Assembly
- Cabinet of Uttarakhand
- Chief Justice of Uttarakhand
- Leader of the Opposition in Lok Sabha
- Leader of the Opposition in Rajya Sabha
- List of current Indian opposition leaders
