= Tiwari ministry (Uttarakhand) =

- 3rd Ministry of Uttarakhand
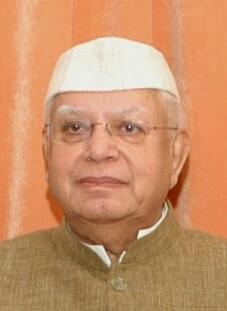
- N. D. Tiwari
- Date formed: 2 March 2002
- Date dissolved: 7 March 2007

People and organisations
- Head of state: Surjit Singh Barnala; Sudarshan Agarwal
- Head of government: N. D. Tiwari
- Member parties: Indian National Congress
- Status in legislature: Majority
- Opposition party: Bharatiya Janata Party
- Opposition leader: Bhagat Singh Koshyari; Matbar Singh Kandari

History
- Incoming formation: 1st Assembly
- Outgoing formation: 2nd Assembly
- Election: 2002
- Outgoing election: 2007
- Legislature term: 5 years
- Predecessor: Koshyari ministry
- Successor: First Khanduri ministry

The Narayan Datt Tiwari ministry was the Cabinet of Uttarakhand headed by the Chief Minister of Uttarakhand, N. D. Tiwari from 2002 to 2007.

== Council of Ministers ==
Name	Office	Constituency	Portfolio	Took Office	Left Office	Party
N. D. Tiwari	Chief Minister	Ramnagar	All Departments not allotted to other ministers	2 March 2002	7 March 2007	Indian National Congress
Indira Hridayesh	Cabinet Minister	Haldwani	Public Works, Parliamentary Affairs, State Assets, Information, Science & Technology	2 March 2002	7 March 2007	Indian National Congress
Narendra Singh Bhandari	Cabinet Minister	Pauri	Primary education, Secondary education, Language	2 March 2002	7 March 2007	Indian National Congress
Hira Singh Bisht	Cabinet Minister	Rajpur	Transport, Technical Education, Labour, Employment & Training	2 March 2002	7 March 2007	Indian National Congress
Tilak Raj Behar	Cabinet Minister	Rudrapur-Kichha	Medicine, Health & Family Welfare	2 March 2002	7 March 2007	Indian National Congress
Tejpal Singh Rawat	Cabinet Minister	Dhumakot	Tourism, Excise & Soldier Welfare	2 March 2002	7 March 2007	Indian National Congress
Mahendra Singh Mahra	Cabinet Minister	Lohaghat	Agriculture, Agricultural Marketing, Watershed Management	2 March 2002	7 March 2007	Indian National Congress
Pritam Singh	Cabinet Minister	Chakrata	Panchayati Raj, Sports, Rural Engineering, Freedom Fighters, Food & Civil Supplies	2 March 2002	7 March 2007	Indian National Congress
Nav Prabhat	Cabinet Minister	Vikasnagar	Environment and Forest, Urban Development, Urban employment and poverty alleviation	2 March 2002	7 March 2007	Indian National Congress
Govind Singh Kunjwal	Cabinet Minister	Jageshwar	Horticulture, Khadi and Village Industries, Micro, Small & Medium Enterprises	2 March 2002	7 March 2007	Indian National Congress
Amrita Rawat	Minister of State	Bironkhal	Energy, Women Empowerment, Irrigation and Child Welfare	2 March 2002	7 March 2007	Indian National Congress
Sadhu Ram	Minister of State	Sahaspur	Sugarcane Development and Sugar Industry	2 March 2002	7 March 2007	Indian National Congress
Shoorveer Singh Sajwan	Cabinet Minister	Rishikesh	Irrigation, flood control, Minor irrigation	2 March 2002	6 July 2004	Indian National Congress
Surendra Singh Negi	Cabinet Minister	Kotdwar	Rural Development, Drinking Water	2 March 2002	6 July 2004	Indian National Congress
Ram Prasad Tamta	Cabinet Minister	Bageshwar	Social Welfare, Women Welfare	2 March 2002	6 July 2004	Indian National Congress
Mantri Prasad Naithani	Cabinet Minister	Devprayag	Cooperatives, Animal husbandry, Milk development	2 March 2002	6 July 2004	Indian National Congress
Harak Singh Rawat	Cabinet Minister	Lansdowne	Revenue, Food & Civil Supplies, Census	2 March 2002	18 June 2003	Indian National Congress
Kishore Upadhyaya	Minister of State	Tehri	Industrial Development	2 March 2002	6 July 2004	Indian National Congress
