= Pokhriyal ministry =

- 5th Ministry of Uttarakhand
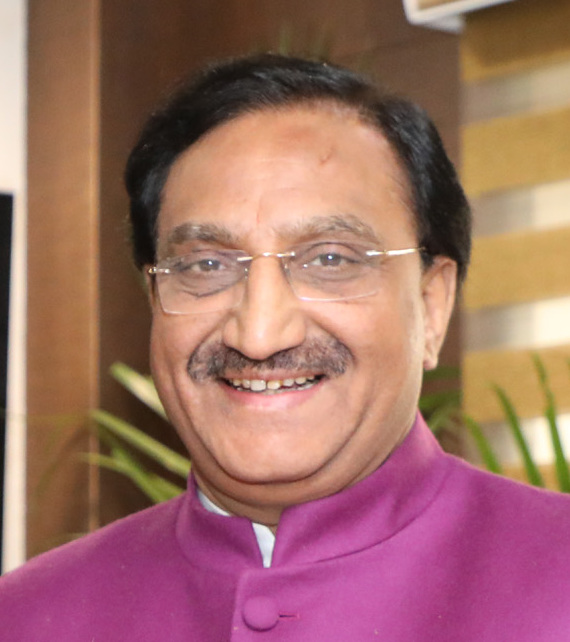
- Ramesh Pokhriyal
- Date formed: 27 June 2009
- Date dissolved: 10 September 2011

People and organisations
- Head of state: Banwari Lal Joshi; Margaret Alva
- Head of government: Ramesh Pokhriyal
- Member parties: Bharatiya Janata Party; Uttarakhand Kranti Dal; Independents
- Status in legislature: Majority
- Opposition party: Indian National Congress
- Opposition leader: Harak Singh Rawat

History
- Incoming formation: 2nd Assembly
- Legislature term: 5 years
- Predecessor: First Khanduri ministry
- Successor: Second Khanduri ministry

The Ramesh Pokhriyal ministry was the Cabinet of Uttarakhand headed by the Chief Minister of Uttarakhand, Ramesh Pokhriyal from 2009 to 2011.

== Council of Ministers ==
Here is the list of ministers.

Name	Office	Portfolio	Took Office	Left Office	Party
Ramesh Pokhriyal	Chief Minister		27 June 2009	10 September 2011	Bharatiya Janata Party
Matbar Singh Kandari	Cabinet Minister	Irrigation, Minor Irrigation, Flood Control, Food & Civil Supplies, Social Welfare and Handicapped Welfare	27 June 2009	10 September 2011	Bharatiya Janata Party
Prakash Pant	Cabinet Minister	Parliamentary Affairs, Legislatures, Drinking Water, Labour, Re-organisation, Externally aided project, Election, Uttarakhand river projects related to India Nepal Border	1 July 2009	10 September 2011	Bharatiya Janata Party
Diwakar Bhatt	Cabinet Minister	Revenue, Land management, Disaster management, Food & Civil Supplies, Soldier Welfare	1 July 2009	10 September 2011	Uttarakhand Kranti Dal
Madan Kaushik	Cabinet Minister	Excise, Sugarcane Development and Sugar Industry, Urban Development, Tourism	27 June 2009	10 September 2011	Bharatiya Janata Party
Trivendra Singh Rawat	Cabinet Minister	Agriculture, Agricultural Education, Agricultural Marketing, Fruit industry, Animal Husbandry, Milk Development, Fisheries	1 July 2009	10 September 2011	Bharatiya Janata Party
Rajendra Singh Bhandari	Cabinet Minister	Panchayati Raj, Alternative Energy, Census, Civil Defense and Home Guard, Jail	1 July 2009	10 September 2011	Independent
Vijaya Barthwal	Minister of State (Independent Charge)	Rural Development, Women Welfare and Child Development	1 July 2009	10 September 2011	Bharatiya Janata Party
Govind Singh Bisht	Minister of State (Independent Charge)	Education (Primary, Secondary and Higher)	1 July 2009	10 September 2011	Bharatiya Janata Party
Khajan Dass	Minister of State	Disaster Management, Social Welfare	1 July 2009	10 September 2011	Bharatiya Janata Party
Balwant Singh Bhauryal	Minister of State	Health & Family Welfare, Information Technology	1 July 2009	10 September 2011	Bharatiya Janata Party
Bishan Singh Chuphal	Cabinet Minister	Forests and wild animals, Environment, Watershed management, Transport, Cooperatives, Protocol, Rural Engineering	5 July 2009	24 December 2009	Bharatiya Janata Party
