= First Khanduri ministry =

- 4th Ministry of Uttarakhand
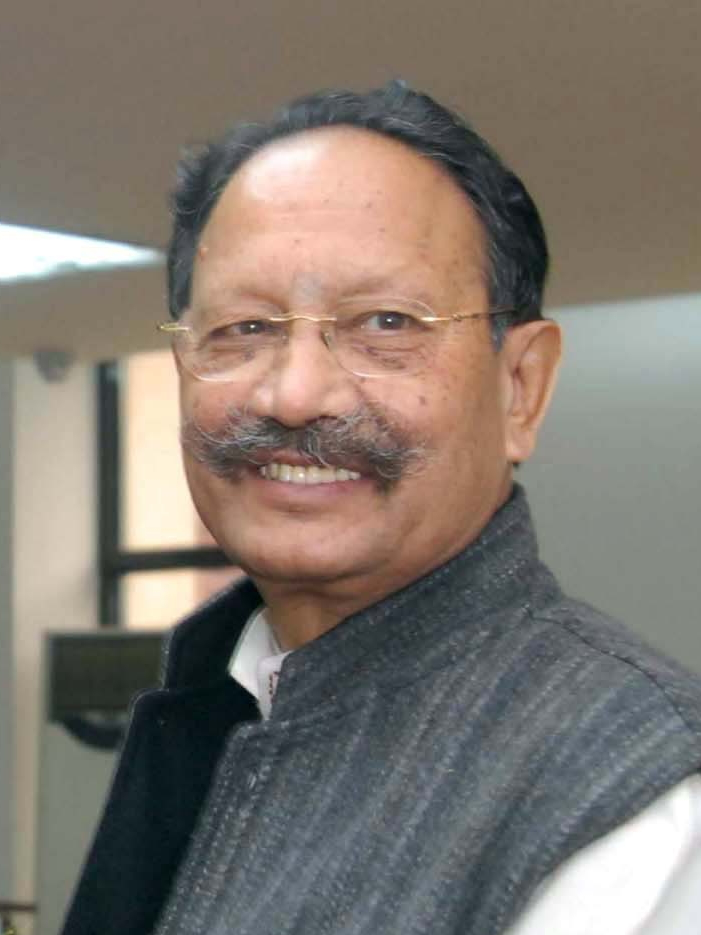
- B. C. Khanduri
- Date formed: 7 March 2007
- Date dissolved: 26 June 2009

People and organisations
- Head of state: Sudarshan Agarwal; Banwari Lal Joshi
- Head of government: B. C. Khanduri
- No. of ministers: 11
- Total no. of members: 12
- Member parties: Bharatiya Janata Party; Uttarakhand Kranti Dal; Independents
- Status in legislature: Majority
- Opposition party: Indian National Congress
- Opposition leader: Harak Singh Rawat

History
- Election: 2007
- Legislature term: 5 years
- Incoming formation: 2nd Assembly
- Predecessor: Tiwari ministry
- Successor: Pokhriyal ministry

This First Bhuwan Chandra Khanduri ministry was the Cabinet of Uttarakhand headed by the Chief Minister of Uttarakhand, B. C. Khanduri from 2007 to 2009.

== Council of Ministers ==
=== Cabinet Ministers ===
Portfolio	Minister	Took office	Left office	Party
Chief Minister; Department Personnel; Home; Public Works Department; Information; Urban Development; Departments not allotted to any Minister	B. C. Khanduri	7 March 2007	26 June 2009	BJP
Minister of Tourism, Culture, Pilgrimage & Endowment; Minister of Parliamentary Affairs	Prakash Pant	7 March 2007	26 June 2009	BJP
Minister of Health & Family Welfare; Minister of Science & Technology	Ramesh Pokhriyal	27 March 2007	26 June 2009	BJP
Minister of Irrigation & Water Resources	Matbar Singh Kandari	27 March 2007	26 June 2009	BJP
Minister of Environment & Forest; Minister of Transport	Banshidhar Bhagat	27 March 2007	26 June 2009	BJP
Minister of Rural Development & Panchayati Raj; Minister of Cooperatives	Bishan Singh Chuphal	27 March 2007	26 June 2009	BJP
Minister of Revenue & Rehabilitation; Minister of Food & Civil Supplies	Diwakar Bhatt	27 March 2007	26 June 2009	UKD
Minister of Agriculture; Minister of Animal Husbandry, Dairy Farming & Fisheries	Trivendra Singh Rawat	27 March 2007	26 June 2009	BJP
Minister of Education; Minister of Excise; Minister of Sugarcane Development & Sugar Industries	Madan Kaushik	27 March 2007	26 June 2009	BJP
Minister of Labour & Employment; Minister of Youth Welfare & Sports	Rajendra Singh Bhandari	27 March 2007	26 June 2009	Independent

=== Ministers of state ===
Portfolio	Minister	Took office	Left office	Party
Minister of Social Justice & Empowerment	Ajay Tamta	27 March 2007	26 June 2009	BJP
Minister of Women Empowerment & Child Development	Vina Mahrana	27 March 2007	26 June 2009	BJP
