= Koshyari ministry =

- 2nd Ministry of Uttaranchal
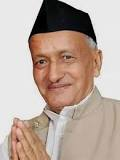
- Bhagat Singh Koshyari
- Date formed: 30 October 2001
- Date dissolved: 1 March 2002

People and organisations
- Head of state: Surjit Singh Barnala
- Head of government: Bhagat Singh Koshyari
- Member parties: Bharatiya Janata Party
- Status in legislature: Majority

History
- Outgoing formation: 1st Assembly
- Election: Interim Uttaranchal Assembly
- Outgoing election: 2002
- Predecessor: Swami ministry
- Successor: Tiwari ministry

The Bhagat Singh Koshyari was the Cabinet of Uttaranchal headed by the Chief Minister of Uttaranchal from 2001 to 2002.

== Council of Ministers ==
Name	Office	Portfolio	Took Office	Left Office	Party
Bhagat Singh Koshyari	Chief Minister		30 October 2001	1 March 2002	BJP
Ramesh Pokhriyal	Cabinet Minister	Finance, Rural Development, Medical Education, Planning, Revenue, Drinking Water, Trade Tax	30 October 2001	1 March 2002	BJP
Kedar Singh Phonia	Cabinet Minister		30 October 2001	1 March 2002	BJP
Matbar Singh Kandari	Cabinet Minister	Forest	30 October 2001	1 March 2002	BJP
Ajay Bhatt	Cabinet Minister		30 October 2001	1 March 2002	BJP
Harbans Kapoor	Cabinet Minister	Urban Development, Housing, Labour & Employment	30 October 2001	1 March 2002	BJP
Mohan Singh Rawat	Cabinet Minister		30 October 2001	1 March 2002	BJP
Narayan Ram Das	Cabinet Minister		30 October 2001	1 March 2002	BJP
