= Second Khanduri ministry =

- 6th Ministry of Uttarakhand
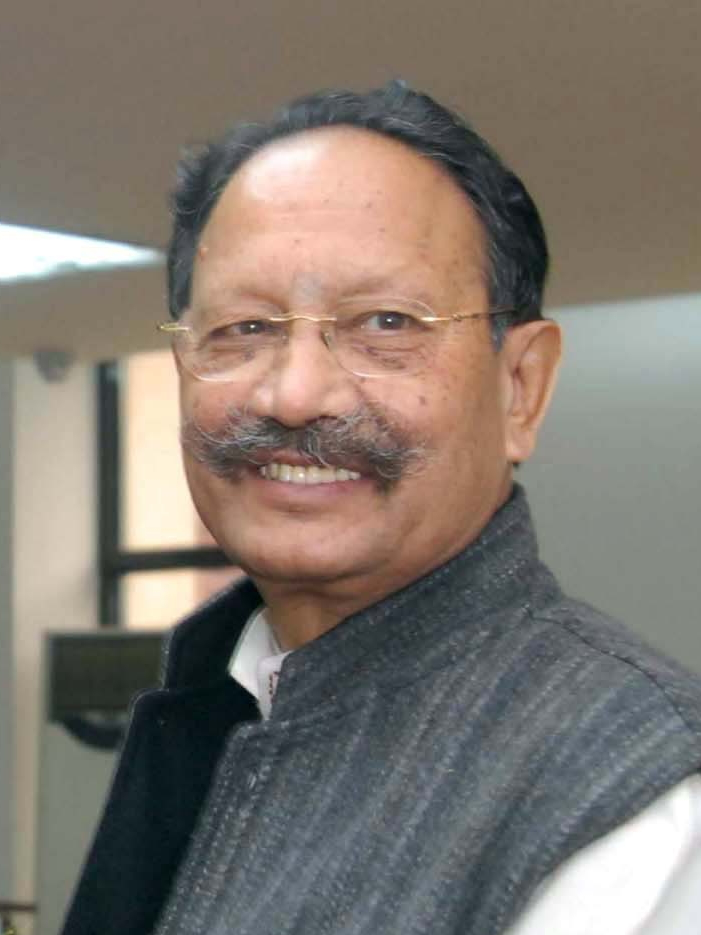
- B. C. Khanduri
- Date formed: 11 September 2011
- Date dissolved: 12 March 2012

People and organisations
- Head of state: Margaret Alva
- Head of government: B. C. Khanduri
- Member parties: Bharatiya Janata Party; Uttarakhand Kranti Dal; Independents
- Status in legislature: Majority
- Opposition party: Indian National Congress
- Opposition leader: Harak Singh Rawat

History
- Incoming formation: 2nd Assembly
- Outgoing formation: 3rd Assembly
- Outgoing election: 2012
- Legislature term: 5 years
- Predecessor: Pokhriyal ministry
- Successor: Bahuguna ministry

The Second Bhuwan Chandra Khanduri ministry was the Cabinet of Uttarakhand headed by the Chief Minister of Uttarakhand, B. C. Khanduri from 2011 to 2012.

== Council of Ministers ==
Name	Office	Portfolio	Took Office	Left Office
B. C. Khanduri	Chief Minister		11 September 2011	12 March 2012
Matbar Singh Kandari	Cabinet Minister	Irrigation, Minor Irrigation, Flood Control, Food & Civil Supplies, Social Welfare & Handicapped Welfare	11 September 2011	12 March 2012
Trivendra Singh Rawat	Cabinet Minister	Agriculture, Agricultural Education, Agricultural Marketing, Fruit industry, Animal Husbandry, Milk Development, Fisheries	11 September 2011	12 March 2012
Bishan Singh Chuphal	Cabinet Minister		11 September 2011	12 March 2012
Madan Kaushik	Cabinet Minister	Excise, Sugarcane Development, Sugar Mill Industries, Tourism	11 September 2011	12 March 2012
Prakash Pant	Cabinet Minister	Parliamentary Affairs, Legislatures, Drinking Water, Labour, Re-organisation, Election, External Planning	11 September 2011	12 March 2012
Diwakar Bhatt	Cabinet Minister	Food & Civil Supplies, Urban Development, Urban Employment, Poverty Alleviation	11 September 2011	12 March 2012
Rajendra Singh Bhandari	Cabinet Minister	Panchayati Raj, Alternative Energy, Census, Civil Defense and Home Guard, Jail	11 September 2011	12 March 2012
Vijaya Barthwal	Minister of State (Independent Charge)	Rural Development, Women Welfare & Child Development	11 September 2011	12 March 2012
Govind Singh Bisht	Minister of State (Independent Charge)		11 September 2011	12 March 2012
Khajan Dass	Minister of State	Disaster Management, Social Welfare	11 September 2011	12 March 2012
Balwant Singh Bhauryal	Minister of State	Health & Family Welfare, Information Technology	11 September 2011	12 March 2012
