= 4th Uttarakhand Assembly =

Fourth Uttarakhand Legislative Assembly

Type
- Type: Unicameral
- Houses: Uttarakhand Legislative Assembly

History
- Preceded by: 3rd Uttarakhand Assembly
- Succeeded by: 5th Uttarakhand Assembly

Leadership
- Speaker: Premchand Aggarwal, BJP
- Deputy Speaker: Raghunath Singh Chauhan, BJP
- Leader of the House: Trivendra Singh Rawat (2017–21), BJP; Tirath Singh Rawat (2021), BJP; Pushkar Singh Dhami (2021–2022), BJP
- Leader of the Opposition: Indira Hridayesh (2017–21), INC; Pritam Singh (2021–2022), INC
- Chief Secretary: Utpal Kumar Singh, IAS

Structure
- Seats: 70^{[†]}
- Political groups: Government (57): BJP (57); Opposition (11): INC (11); Others (2): Independent (2); Nominated (1) (Note: Nominated seat abolished in 2020.): BJP (1)
- Length of term: 2017–2022

Elections
- Voting system: first-past-the-post
- Last election: 15 February 2017
- Next election: 2022

Meeting place
- Vidhan Bhavan, Bhararisain (summer); Vidhan Bhavan, Dehradun (winter)

Website
- Uttarakhand Legislative Assembly

Constitution
- Constitution of India

Footnotes
- ^† 70 seats are open for the direct election while 1 seat was reserved for the member of Anglo-Indian community until 2020, following abolition of the seat.

The 2017 Uttarakhand Legislative Assembly election were the fourth Vidhan Sabha (Legislative Assembly) election of the state. Elections were held on 15 February 2017 when Bharatiya Janata Party emerged as the single largest party with 57 seats in the 70-seat legislature and formed the government. The Indian National Congress with 11 seats served as the official opposition.

After discussions it was announced that Trivendra Singh Rawat would be Chief Minister.

== Party position in the Assembly ==
Rank	Party	Abbr.	Seats	Leader in the House
1	Bharatiya Janata Party	BJP	57	Trivendra Singh Rawat (2017–2021); Tirath Singh Rawat (2021); Pushkar Singh Dhami (2021–2022)
2	Indian National Congress	INC	11	Indira Hridayesh (2017–2021); Pritam Singh (2021–2022)
3	Independent	Ind.	02	N/A
	Total		70	

== Key post holders in the Assembly ==
- Speaker : Premchand Aggarwal
- Deputy Speaker : Raghunath Singh Chauhan
- Leader of the House: Trivendra Singh Rawat (2017–2021)
  Tirath Singh Rawat (2021)
  Pushkar Singh Dhami (2021–2022)
- Leader of the Opposition : Indira Hridayesh (2017–2022)
  Pritam Singh (2021–2022)
- Chief Secretary : Utpal Kumar Singh

== Members of the Fourth Uttarakhand Assembly ==
S. No.	Constituency	Elected Member	Party affiliation
1	Purola (SC)	Raj Kumar	BJP
2	Yamunotri	Kedar Singh Rawat	BJP
3	Gangotri	Gopal Singh Rawat^{†}	BJP
4	Badrinath	Mahendra Bhatt	BJP
5	Tharali (SC)	Magan Lal Shah^{†}	BJP
6	Karnaprayag	Surendra Singh Negi	BJP
7	Kedarnath	Manoj Rawat	INC
8	Rudraprayag	Bharat Singh Chaudhary	BJP
9	Ghansali (SC)	Shakti Lal Shah	BJP
10	Devprayag	Vinod Kandari	BJP
11	Narendranagar	Subodh Uniyal	BJP
12	Pratapnagar	Vijay Singh Panwar	BJP
13	Tehri	Dhan Singh Negi	BJP
14	Dhanaulti	Pritam Singh Panwar	BJP
15	Chakrata (ST)	Pritam Singh	INC
16	Vikasnagar	Munna Singh Chauhan	BJP
17	Sahaspur	Sahdev Singh Pundir	BJP
18	Dharampur	Vinod Chamoli	BJP
19	Raipur	Umesh Sharma 'Kau'	BJP
20	Rajpur Road (SC)	Khajan Dass	BJP
21	Dehradun Cantonment	Harbans Kapoor^{†}	BJP
22	Mussoorie	Ganesh Joshi	BJP
23	Doiwala	Trivendra Singh Rawat	BJP
24	Rishikesh	Premchand Aggarwal	BJP
25	Haridwar	Madan Kaushik	BJP
26	BHEL Ranipur	Adesh Chauhan	BJP
27	Jwalapur (SC)	Suresh Rathod	BJP
28	Bhagwanpur (SC)	Mamta Rakesh	INC
29	Jhabrera (SC)	Deshraj Karnwal	BJP
30	Piran Kaliyar	Furqan Ahmad	INC
31	Roorkee	Pradip Batra	BJP
32	Khanpur	Pranav Singh 'Champion'	BJP
33	Manglaur	Muhammad Nizamuddin	INC
34	Laksar	Sanjay Gupta	BJP
35	Haridwar Rural	Yatishwaranand	BJP
36	Yamkeshwar	Ritu Khanduri Bhushan	BJP
37	Pauri (SC)	Mukesh Singh Koli	BJP
38	Srinagar	Dr. Dhan Singh Rawat	BJP
39	Chaubattakhal	Satpal Maharaj	BJP
40	Lansdowne	Dilip Singh Rawat	BJP
41	Kotdwar	Dr. Harak Singh Rawat	BJP
42	Dharchula	Harish Singh Dhami	INC
43	Didihat	Bishan Singh Chuphal	BJP
44	Pithoragarh	Prakash Pant^{†}	BJP
45	Gangolihat (SC)	Mina Gangola	BJP
46	Kapkot	Balwant Singh Bhauryal	BJP
47	Bageshwar (SC)	Chandan Ram Das	BJP
48	Dwarahat	Mahesh Singh Negi	BJP
49	Salt	Surendra Singh Jeena^{†}	BJP
50	Ranikhet	Karan Mahara	INC
51	Someshwar (SC)	Rekha Arya	BJP
52	Almora	Raghunath Singh Chauhan	BJP
53	Jageshwar	Govind Singh Kunjwal	INC
54	Lohaghat	Puran Singh Phartyal	BJP
55	Champawat	Kailash Chandra Gahtori	BJP
56	Lalkuan	Navin Chandra Dumka	BJP
57	Bhimtal	Ram Singh Kaira	BJP
58	Nainital (SC)	Sanjiv Arya	BJP
59	Haldwani	Dr. Indira Hridayesh^{†}	INC
60	Kaladhungi	Banshidhar Bhagat	BJP
61	Ramnagar	Diwan Singh Bisht	BJP
62	Jaspur	Adesh Singh Chauhan	INC
63	Kashipur	Harbhajan Singh Cheema	BJP
64	Bajpur (SC)	Yashpal Arya	BJP
65	Gadarpur	Arvind Pandey	BJP
66	Rudrapur	Rajkumar Thukral	BJP
67	Kichha	Rajesh Shukla	BJP
68	Sitarganj	Saurabh Bahuguna	BJP
69	Nanakmatta (ST)	Dr. Prem Singh Rana	BJP
70	Khatima	Pushkar Singh Dhami	BJP
71	Anglo-Indian (until 25 January 2020)	George Ivan Gregory Mann (Note: The reserved seat for the member of Anglo-Indian community was abolished on 25 January 2020 by the 104th Constitutional Amendment Act, 2019, reducing the strength of Assembly from 71 to 70 seats.)	BJP

Key

^{†} – Died in office

=== By-elections ===
S. No.	Constituency	Elected Member	Party affiliation
5	Tharali (SC)	Munni Shah	BJP
44	Pithoragarh	Chandra Pant	BJP
49	Salt	Mahesh Singh Jeena	BJP

== See also ==
- 2017 Uttarakhand Legislative Assembly election
- Trivendra Singh Rawat ministry
- Tirath Singh Rawat ministry
- First Dhami ministry
- Politics of Uttarakhand
