= Khanduri ministry =

Khanduri ministry may refer to:

- First Khanduri ministry, the 4th government of Uttarakhand headed by B. C. Khanduri from 2007 to 2009
- Second Khanduri ministry, the 6th government of Uttarakhand headed by B. C. Khanduri from 2011 to 2012

== See also ==
- B. C. Khanduri
