= Sumit Hridayesh =

Indian politician

Member of the Uttarakhand Legislative Assembly
- Incumbent
- Assumed office 10 March 2022
- Preceded by: Indira Hridayesh
- Constituency: Haldwani

Personal details
- Party: Indian National Congress
- Parent: Indira Hridayesh (mother)
- Education: Michigan State University
- Profession: Politician

Sumit Hridayesh is an Indian politician and the MLA from Haldwani Assembly constituency. He is a member of the Indian National Congress.

== Political career ==
Hridayesh had contested the Haldwani mayoral election in 2018 as a Congress candidate but lost to Jogendra Pal Singh Rautela of the Bharatiya Janata Party (BJP) by a margin of 10,854 votes. In 2022, he was declared the Congress representative from Haldwani Assembly constituency following the death of his mother Indira Hridayesh. He won the seat by a margin of 7,814 votes, defeating the city's then mayor, Jogendra Pal Singh Rautela.
