= K. C. Singh Baba =

Indian politician

Karan Chand Singh Baba

Maharaja of Kumaon
- Reign: 1997 – present
- Born: 29 March 1947 (age 79); Lucknow, United Provinces, British India
- Spouse: Mani Mala Singh
- Issue: 2 sons, 1 daughter

Karan Chand Singh Baba करण चन्द सिंह बाबा

Member of Parliament
- In office 2004–2014
- Preceded by: Mahendra Singh Pal
- Succeeded by: B. S. Koshyari
- Constituency: Nainital–Udhamsingh Nagar

Personal details
- Born: 29 March 1947 (age 79) Lucknow, United Provinces, British India
- Party: Indian National Congress
- Spouse: Mani Mala Singh
Children
2 sons, 1 daughter
Styles of Karan Chand Singh Baba
- Reference style: His Highness
- Spoken style: Your Highness
- Alternative style: Kumaon Naresh
- As of 16 September, 2006

Rajadhiraj Karan Chand Singh Baba (born 29 March 1947) is the current Maharaja of Kumaon and also an Indian politician who was a member of the 14th and 15th Lok Sabha of the Parliament of India. He represented the Nainital-Udhamsingh Nagar constituency of Uttarakhand and is a member of the Indian National Congress (INC) political party.

He is a graduate of St.Joseph's College in Nainital. Currently he stays in Kashipur Fort, Kashipur.

== Positions held ==
| Year | Description |
|---|---|
| 1986–89 | Chairman – Municipal Council, Kashipur, Uttar Pradesh |
| 1989–91 | Elected to the 10th Uttar Pradesh Assembly |
| 1996–2000 | Elected to the 12th Uttar Pradesh Assembly |
| 2002–02 | Elected to Interim Uttaranchal Assembly |
| 2004–09 | Elected to 14th Lok Sabha: Member, Committee on Science & Technology, Environment & Forests; Member, Committee on Public Undertakings |
| 2009–14 | Elected to 15th Lok Sabha: Member, Committee on Public Undertakings; Member, Committee on Agriculture; Member, Committee, Science & Technology, Environment & Forests Member, Committee on Sports |

=== Sports and Clubs ===
- Uttar Pradesh Power Lifting Champion (five times),
- Winner of strongest Man of U.P. and Best Lifter Award;
- Two times National Power Lifting Champion,
- Held national records in Bench Press;
- Asia Championship; won two Silver and two Bronze Medals;
- Member of the Indian National Team that won the Asian Championship held in Indonesia, 1984.
