= Govind Singh Bisht =

Indian politician

Member of the Uttarakhand Legislative Assembly
- In office 2007–2012
- Preceded by: Harish Chandra Durgapal
- Succeeded by: Constituency abolished
- Constituency: Dhari

Personal details
- Party: Bharatiya Janata Party

Govind Singh Bisht is an Indian politician and member of the Bharatiya Janata Party. Bisht was a member of the Uttarakhand Legislative Assembly from Dhari constituency in Nainital District. He was also a cabinate minister in Khanduri ministry from 2011 to 2012.

== Education ==
Bisht is a graduate and he did his L.L.B from Lucknow University in 1981.
