= Raja Ka Rampur =

- Town
- Location in Uttar Pradesh, India
- Coordinates: 27°36′N 79°12′E
- Country: India
- State: Uttar Pradesh
- District: Etah

Population (2018)
  - Total: 14,960

Languages
  - Official: Hindi
- Time zone: UTC+5:30 (IST)
- Website: etah.nic.in

Raja Ka Rampur is a town, and one of the oldest nagar panchayat in Etah district in the Indian state of Uttar Pradesh.

It is situated on Etah-Aliganj-Rudain-Kampil-Kaimganj road route.

== History ==
It began as a settlement of farmers and tribes of Panchal Kingdom, close to banks of Ganga and Kampil rivers. It was part of Kingdom of Rudrayan of Mahabharat period (now Rudain). In the 14th century, Ramsingh from Kannauj migrated there with families of various castes and established a small and local kingdom. However, during the British period, Raja-Ka-Rampur became an important town. The Lord Dau Ji temple is there.

== Demographics ==
As of 2011 Indian Census, Raja Ka Rampur had a population of 35,740. Males constitute 53% of the population and females 47%. Raja Ka Rampur has an average literacy rate of 52%, lower than the national average of 59.5%: male literacy is 60%, and female literacy is 44%. In Raja Ka Rampur, 18% of the population is under 6.

== Transport ==
The nearest Railway Stations are Ballupur and Rudain, which come under NER. Rail services connect directly to Farrukhabad-Kanpur on one side and Kasganj-Hathras-Mathura-Agra on the other side. Bus service reaches District Headquarters Etah, Aligarh- Delhi route, which is also connected to Bareilly.

== Education ==
The districts oldest college is BDRS Inter College. Two more Intermediate colleges: RBL Inter College and the Govt. Girls Inter College are present. It has one post-graduate degree college, Dr RKGD College. The schools in the town include Amar Shahid Mahaveer Singh Smarak Balika Vidyalaya, Champa Devi Junior Girls High School, and Adarsh Vidhya Mandir Junior High School. Mahavir singh Academy & S.N. Memorial Public School.
