= Prakash Pant =

Indian politician and pharmacist (1960–2019)

Finance Minister of Uttarakhand
- In office 18 March 2017 – 5 June 2019
- Chief Minister: Trivendra Singh Rawat
- Preceded by: Indira Hridayesh
- Succeeded by: Trivendra Singh Rawat

Minister of Tourism,Drinking Water, Election, Culture, Pilgrimage & Environment
- In office 7 March 2007 – 12 March 2012
- Chief Minister: B.C. Khanduri; Ramesh Pokhriyal; B.C. Khanduri

1'st Speaker of the Uttarakhand Legislative Assembly
- In office 2000–2002
- Preceded by: Office established
- Succeeded by: Yashpal Arya

MLA of Uttarakhand Legislative Assembly
- In office 2002–2012
- Preceded by: Krishna Chandra Punetha
- Succeeded by: Mayukh Mahar
- Constituency: Pithoragarh
- In office 2017–2019
- Preceded by: Mayukh Mahar
- Succeeded by: Chandra Pant
- Constituency: Pithoragarh

Member of Legislative Council
- In office 1998–2002
- Succeeded by: Constituency abolished
- Constituency: Kumaon Local Authorities

Personal details
- Born: 11 November 1960 Pithoragarh, Uttarakhand, India
- Died: 5 June 2019 (aged 58) Houston, Texas, U.S.
- Party: Bharatiya Janata Party
- Spouse: Chandra Pant
- Children: 1
- Education: Diploma in Pharmacy (D.Pharm) from Government Polytechnic College in Dwarahat and B.A. degree from the Eastern Institute for Integrated Learning in Management

Prakash Pant (11 November 1960 - 5 June 2019) was an Indian politician and pharmacist and a member of Bharatiya Janata Party who served as the first speaker of Uttarakhand Legislative Assembly. He was elected from Pithoragarh (Vidhan Sabha constituency) in the 2002 , 2007 and 2017 but in 2012, he lost to Mayukh Mahar of Indian National Congress by a significant margin before regaining it from him in 2017. He was the first speaker of Uttarakhand Legislative Assembly. He was also a minister in Government of Uttarakhand with portfolios of Finance, Tourism, Culture, Pilgrimage Endowment, parliamentary Affairs & Reorganization. He was MLC from 1998 till 2002 before the formation of Uttarakhand.

He died of lung cancer in Houston, Texas on 5 June 2019.

== Early life and education ==
Prakash Pant was born on November 11, 1960, into a humble family in a small village in Pithoragarh, Uttarakhand. Prakash Pant completed his intermediate in the year 1977. In 1980, he graduated in pharmacy from Dwarahat. Pant displayed leadership qualities from an early age. In 2004, he won a gold medal in the state shooting championship. He was a well-traveled person and had lived in various countries like the UK, Japan, China, Australia, and New Zealand. Despite being in government service, he worked selflessly among the underprivileged and marginalized sections of society to help them prosper and rise. He resigned from government service to work solely for the underprivileged and joined politics.

== Personal life ==
His wife Chandra Pant is a teacher by profession who was also a member of legislative assembly from pithoragarh from 2019 till 2022. His daughter Namita Pant is an officer in the Indian army.

== Political career ==
Prakash Pant possessed leadership qualities from an early age. A pharmacist by profession, Pant began his political career in 1977 when he was elected general secretary of the Military Science Board. Ten years later, he was elected as the member of Legislative Council U.P. Soon when Uttaranchal (now Uttarakhand) became a state in 2000, Pant became the first speaker of the state assembly. In the first Assembly elections in 2002, he was elected to Uttarakhand Assembly from Pithoragarh and then again in 2007. With the Khanduri government coming to power, he became a cabinet minister and was given the parliamentary affairs portfolio. In 2012 election, he faced his first defeat from Mayukh Mahar of the Congress, by a huge margin but won in 2017 from Pithoragarh. At that time he was a frontrunner for the post of Chief Minister of Uttarakhand but he instead ended up becoming the second most important person, the Finance Minister of Uttarakhand. Up until his death, Pant was a Cabinet Minister in the state of Uttarakhand and held portfolios of Finance, Tourism, Culture, Pilgrimage Endowment, Parliamentary Affairs, and Reorganization.

== Electoral performance ==
Election	Constituency	Party	Result	Votes %	Opposition Candidate	Opposition Party	Opposition vote %	Ref
2017	Pithoragarh	BJP	Won	49.16%	Mayukh Mahar	INC	45.15%	
2012 bye election	Sitarganj	BJP	Lost	19.82%	Vijay Bahuguna	INC	77.14%	
2012	Pithoragarh	BJP	Lost	36.37%	Mayukh Mahar	INC	59.46%	
2007	Pithoragarh	BJP	Won	50.86%	Ravindra Singh (Kiran Maldar)	INC	39.52%	
2002	Pithoragarh	BJP	Won	39.15%	Mayukh Mahar	INC	24.18%	
