= Rudraprayag Assembly constituency =

Uttarakhand Legislative Assembly constituency

Coordinates: 30.28°N 78.98°E

Rudraprayag
- Constituency No. 8 for the Uttarakhand Legislative Assembly

Constituency details
- Country: India
- Region: North India
- State: Uttarakhand
- District: Rudraprayag
- Lok Sabha constituency: Garhwal
- Established: 2002
- Total electors: 103,675 (2022)
- Reservation: None

Member of Legislative Assembly
- 5th Uttarakhand Legislative Assembly
- Incumbent Bharat Singh Chaudhary
- Party: Bharatiya Janata Party
- Elected year: 2022

Rudraprayag is one of the 70 electoral Uttarakhand Legislative Assembly constituencies of Uttarakhand state in India. It includes Rudraprayag area of Ruraprayag Tehsil and is a part of Garhwal (Lok Sabha constituency). As of 2022, its representative is Bharat Singh Chaudhary of the Bharatiya Janata Party.

== Members of the Legislative Assembly ==
Election	Member	Party
2002	Matbar Singh Kandari	Bharatiya Janata Party
2007	Matbar Singh Kandari	Bharatiya Janata Party
2012	Harak Singh Rawat	Indian National Congress
2017	Bharat Singh Chaudhary	Bharatiya Janata Party
2022	Bharat Singh Chaudhary	Bharatiya Janata Party

== Election results ==
=== 2027 Assembly election ===
2027 Uttarakhand Legislative Assembly election: Rudraprayag
Party	Candidate	Votes	%	±%
INC				
BJP				
NOTA	None of the above			
Majority				
Turnout				
gain from		Swing		

=== Assembly Election 2022 ===
2022 Uttarakhand Legislative Assembly election: Rudraprayag
Party	Candidate	Votes	%	±%
BJP	Bharat Singh Chaudhary	29,660	46.78%	▼3.37
INC	Pradeep Prasad Thapliyal	19,858	31.32%	▲6.19
Independent	Matbar Singh Kandari	4,838	7.63%	New
UKD	Mohit Dimri	4,623	7.29%	New
Independent	Sudhir Negi	1,219	1.92%	New
NOTA	None of the above	871	1.37%	▼0.79
CPI	Sudhir Rauthan	694	1.09%	▼0.18
AAP	Pyar Singh Negi	413	0.65%	New
Independent	Mahabir Singh Jagwan	412	0.65%	New
BMP	Birendra Pratap Singh	323	0.51%	New
Margin of victory		9,802	15.46%	▼9.56
Turnout		63,397	59.89%	▲0.61
Registered electors		1,05,849		▲7.29
BJP hold		Swing	▼3.37	

=== Assembly Election 2017 ===
2017 Uttarakhand Legislative Assembly election: Rudraprayag
Party	Candidate	Votes	%	±%
BJP	Bharat Singh Chaudhary	29,333	50.15%	▲23.63
INC	Laxmi Singh Rana	14,701	25.14%	▼3.87
Independent	Pradeep Prasad Thapliyal	5,818	9.95%	New
Independent	Jagmohan Singh Rauthan	3,342	5.71%	New
NOTA	None of the above	1,266	2.16%	New
BSP	Surjeet Lal	801	1.37%	▼1.17
CPI	Lalita Prasad	746	1.28%	New
Independent	Bhagwati Prasad	711	1.22%	New
Independent	Jai Om Prakash	642	1.10%	New
Independent	Jagdish Singh	359	0.61%	New
Margin of victory		14,632	25.02%	▲22.53
Turnout		58,488	59.28%	▼2.73
Registered electors		98,657		▲14.74
BJP gain from INC		Swing	▲21.14	

=== Assembly Election 2012 ===
2012 Uttarakhand Legislative Assembly election: Rudraprayag
Party	Candidate	Votes	%	±%
INC	Harak Singh Rawat	15,469	29.01%	▲9.56
BJP	Matbar Singh Kandari	14,143	26.52%	▼7.49
Independent	Bharat Singh Chaudhary	7,988	14.98%	New
URM	Arjun Singh	6,331	11.87%	New
Independent	Virendra Singh	3,354	6.29%	New
BSP	Dheer Singh	1,355	2.54%	▼3.61
UKD	Kishori Nandan Dobhal	910	1.71%	▼9.98
SP	Kuldip Singh	720	1.35%	▼1.12
Independent	Bhagwati Prasad	717	1.34%	New
LJP	Kundan Lal	716	1.34%	New
Independent	Vijendra Prasad	477	0.89%	New
Margin of victory		1,326	2.49%	▼12.08
Turnout		53,326	62.02%	▲2.19
Registered electors		85,984		
INC gain from BJP		Swing	▼5.00	

=== Assembly Election 2007 ===
2007 Uttarakhand Legislative Assembly election: Rudraprayag
Party	Candidate	Votes	%	±%
BJP	Matbar Singh Kandari	16,394	34.01%	▼3.64
INC	Virendra Singh Butola	9,374	19.45%	▼3.79
NCP	Bharat Singh Chaudhary	6,322	13.11%	New
UKD	Srikrishna Bhatt	5,635	11.69%	▲3.09
Independent	Beer Singh Rawat	3,123	6.48%	New
BSP	Vikram Singh	2,964	6.15%	▼0.88
BJSH	Virendra Singh Bisht	1,501	3.11%	New
SP	Jaspal Singh	1,189	2.47%	▲0.36
Independent	Anand Singh	688	1.43%	New
Vishwa Vikas Sangh	Leela Nand Bahuguna	572	1.19%	New
SAP	Mahaveer Singh	445	0.92%	▼3.53
Margin of victory		7,020	14.56%	▲0.14
Turnout		48,207	59.96%	▲9.51
Registered electors		80,571		
BJP hold		Swing	▼3.64	

=== Assembly Election 2002 ===
2002 Uttaranchal Legislative Assembly election: Rudraprayag
Party	Candidate	Votes	%	±%
BJP	Matbar Singh Kandari	15,031	37.65%	New
INC	Gajendra Singh	9,275	23.23%	New
UKD	Shrikrishna	3,432	8.60%	New
BSP	Dharma Lal	2,806	7.03%	New
Independent	Bhagwati Prasad	2,313	5.79%	New
SAP	Kishori Nandan	1,779	4.46%	New
Independent	Gulab Singh	1,286	3.22%	New
Uttarakhand Janwadi Party	Badri Prashad Jasola	988	2.47%	New
SP	Jaspal Singh	840	2.10%	New
Independent	Umed Singh	805	2.02%	New
Independent	Prem Prakash	560	1.40%	New
Margin of victory		5,756	14.42%	
Turnout		39,923	50.34%	
Registered electors		79,328		
BJP win (new seat)				

== See also ==
- Badri–Kedar (Uttarakhand Assembly constituency)
- List of constituencies of the Uttarakhand Legislative Assembly
- Rudraprayag district
