= Bhagat Singh Koshyari =

Indian politician (born 1942)

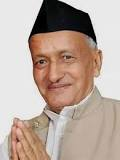
- Koshyari, c. 2020

22nd Governor of Maharashtra
- In office 5 September 2019 – 17 February 2023
- Chief Minister: Devendra Fadnavis; Uddhav Thackeray; Eknath Shinde
- Preceded by: C. Vidyasagar Rao
- Succeeded by: Ramesh Bais

Governor of Goa (Additional Charge)
- In office 18 August 2020 – 6 July 2021
- President: Ram Nath Kovind
- Chief Minister: Pramod Sawant
- Preceded by: Satya Pal Malik
- Succeeded by: P. S. Sreedharan Pillai

2nd Chief Minister of Uttaranchal
- In office 30 October 2001 – 1 March 2002
- Preceded by: Nityanand Swami
- Succeeded by: N. D. Tiwari

Member of Parliament, Rajya Sabha
- In office 26 November 2008 – 16 May 2014
- Preceded by: Harish Rawat
- Succeeded by: Manorama Dobriyal Sharma
- Constituency: Uttarakhand

Member of Parliament, Lok Sabha
- In office 16 May 2014 – 23 May 2019
- Preceded by: K. C. Singh Baba
- Succeeded by: Ajay Bhatt
- Constituency: Nainital–Udhamsingh Nagar

1'st Leader of Opposition, Uttarakhand Legislative Assembly
- In office 13 March 2002 – 17 December 2003
- Preceded by: Office established
- Succeeded by: Matbar Singh Kandari

Cabinet Minister, Government of Uttarakhand
- In office 9 November 2000 – 29 October 2001

Member of Interim Uttaranchal Assembly
- In office 9 November 2000 – 1 March 2002
- Constituency: MLC

Member of Uttaranchal Legislative Assembly
- In office 1 March 2002 – 27 November 2008
- Preceded by: Constituency established
- Succeeded by: Sher Singh Gariya
- Constituency: Kapkot

Personal details
- Born: 17 June 1942 (age 84) Bageshwar, United Provinces, British India (present-day Uttarakhand, India)
- Party: Bharatiya Janata Party
- Education: Master of Arts
- Alma mater: Agra University (MA)
- Occupation: Teacher, Author, Journalist
- Awards: Padma Bhushan (2026)

Bhagat Singh Koshyari (born 17 June 1942) is an Indian politician, journalist, author and former teacher who served as the 22nd governor of Maharashtra from 2019 to 2023. An RSS veteran, Koshyari served as National Vice-President of BJP and party's 3rd State president for Uttarakhand. He also served as 2nd Chief Minister of Uttarakhand (formerly Uttaranchal) from 2001 to 2002 and thereafter, was the first leader of the opposition in the Uttarakhand Legislative Assembly from 2002 to 2003. He also served as an MLC in Uttar Pradesh Legislative Council (when Uttarakhand was part of undivided Uttar Pradesh; later continued in Uttarakhand Legislative Council) and MLA in Uttarakhand Legislative Assembly. He later served as an MP in Rajya Sabha from 2008 to 2014 from Uttarakhand and then the MP in the 16th Lok Sabha from Nainital-Udhamsingh Nagar constituency, earning him the distinction of being elected in both houses of State Legislature and both houses of National Parliament respectively.

As Governor of Maharashtra, Koshyari tainted his legacy when he ignored rules and swore in Devendra Fadnavis as CM and Ajit Pawar as Deputy CM of Maharashtra without his party's consent. He was on the post for less than 80 hours, becoming Deputy CM with the shortest tenure in Devendra Fadnavis led government. Koshyari then played singular role in the dissolution of the Maha Vikas Aghadi government. This action received a rap from the SC and was termed as Illegal by the Supreme Court of India in their order dated 11 May 2023.

Koshyari was awarded with the Padma Bhushan in 2026 for his dedication towards the welfare of the people.

== Personal and professional life ==
Bhagat Singh Koshyari was born on 17 June 1942 to Gopal Singh Koshyari and Motima Devi at Palanadhura Chetabgarh in Bageshwar district of then United Provinces in British India (present Uttarakhand).

Koshyari holds a master's degree in English and studied at Almora College, Almora (then affiliated with Agra University, now S.S.J. Campus Almora of Kumaon University). During this period, Koshyari was also a general secretary of the students' union of Almora College, Almora, between 1961 and 1962. He has also represented the Executive Council of Kumaon University, from 1979 to 1982, 1982 to 1985 and 1988 to 1991.

He has had a successful career as a teacher and journalist. He had worked as a lecturer at Raja Inter College, Raja Ka Rampur, Etah district, Uttar Pradesh for few years. Koshyari is a founder and managing editor of Parvat Piyush, a weekly published from Pithoragarh, Uttarakhand since 1975. He has also published two books, Uttaranchal Pradesh Kyun? and Uttaranchal Sangharsh Evam Samadhan.

== Political career ==
He joined the Rashtriya Swayamsevak Sangh (RSS). He took part in the struggle against the Emergency and was imprisoned he was detained in Almora and Fatehgarh Central Jail under the Maintenance of Internal Security Act (MISA), from 3 July 1975 to 23 March 1977.

In May 1997 he became a member of Uttar Pradesh Legislative Council, upper house of legislature of Uttar Pradesh. In 2000, he was appointed minister of Energy, Irrigation, Law, and Legislative Affairs of the newly created state of Uttaranchal. In 2001 he replaced Nityanand Swami as the chief minister of Uttarakhand. He has also served as the President of the BJP of his state. As a result of his party's defeat in the 2002 Assembly elections, he resigned in March 2002 as the chief minister. However, he was elected from Kapkot assembly constituency, and became the leader of the opposition of the Uttarakhand Legislative Assembly, till 2007.

In the 2007 Assembly elections in Uttarakhand, he was elected again from Kapkot assembly constituency. However, despite the BJP's victory, Koshyari was deprived of the Chief Minister's post by his chief rival, Bhuwan Chandra Khanduri. Media reports have cited that the BJP's central leadership was biased for Bhuwan Chandra Khanduri, despite Koshyari supported by RSS and majority of the elected MLAs. In November 2008 he was elected a member of the Rajya Sabha from Uttarakhand and remained a member till his election to the Lok Sabha in 2014. He has been appointed a national vice-president of BJP and also BJP chief in Uttarakhand.

In the 2014 Indian general election, he was elected to the 16th Lok Sabha from Nainital Uddhamsingh Nagar, Lok Sabha constituency.

On 5 September 2019, he was appointed as the Governor of Maharashtra. Further, in August 2020 he was also appointed as the Governor of Goa (additional charge). He stepped down as the Governor of Maharashtra on 12 February 2023, a month after he met Prime Minister Narendra Modi and expressed his desire to resign from his post and retire, after many decades as a politician and social activist.

== Social activities ==
He founded various schools in Uttarakhand (Saraswati Shishu Mandir, Pithoragarh, Vivekanand Vidya Mandir Inter College, Pithoragarh; and Saraswati Vihar Higher Secondary School, Nainital).

Even after years in politics, he remains steadfast in his dedication to education. He is served as the Governor of Maharashtra and is the (ex-officio) Chancellor of the University of Mumbai. From 2019 till 2023,(during his tenure as the Governor), there have been several crucial developments in the state's higher education atmosphere. These range from the introduction of the NEP 2020, and the setting up of many state cluster universities - Dr. Homi Bhabha State University & HSNC University, Mumbai of which he was the (ex-officio) chancellor.

== Controversies ==
While Koshyari served as the governor, he sparked a row in a speech by saying, "There will be no money left, and Mumbai will cease to exist as the financial capital of India, if Rajasthani-Marwaris and Gujaratis are removed from these areas of Maharashtra". This statement received large backlash from the opposition parties; even the ruling BJP distanced itself from the situation. Koshyari later apologised for hurting the sentiments of Marathi people. Shiv Sena Chief Uddhav Thackeray lashed out to the Governor for his insensitive and senile remarks terming it an insult to Marathi pride.

In November 2022, while giving a speech to students of a university, attended by NCP leader Sharad Pawar and Union Minister Nitin Gadkari, Governor Koshyari called Shivaji an olden days idol, sparking a row of discontent over whole Maharashtra.

== See also ==
- Koshyari ministry

Lok Sabha
Preceded by Karan Chand Singh Baba	Member of Parliament for Nainital–Udhamsingh Nagar; 2014 - 2019	Succeeded by Ajay Bhatt
Political offices
Preceded by Nityanand Swami	Chief Minister of Uttaranchal; 30 October 2001 – 1 March 2002	Succeeded by N. D. Tiwari
Preceded by C. Vidyasagar Rao	Governor of Maharashtra; 5 September 2019 - 17 February 2023	Succeeded by Ramesh Bais
Preceded by Satya Pal Malik	Governor of Goa; Additional Charge; 18 August 2020 - 6 July 2021	Succeeded by P. S. Sreedharan Pillai
