= Pritam Singh (politician, born 1958) =

Indian politician

- प्रीतम सिंह
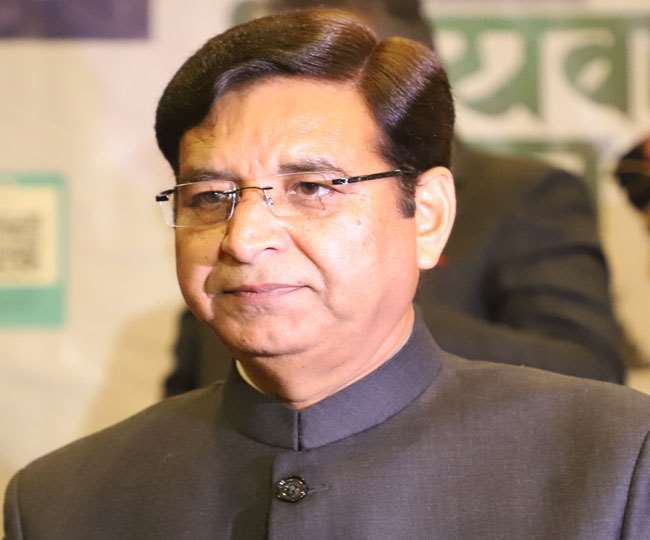

Leader of the Opposition Uttarakhand Legislative Assembly
- In office 22 July 2021 – 10 March 2022
- Preceded by: Indira Hridayesh
- Succeeded by: Yashpal Arya

Member Uttarakhand Legislative Assembly
- Incumbent
- Assumed office 24 February 2002
- Preceded by: Munna Singh Chauhan SP
- Constituency: Chakrata

Member Uttar Pradesh Legislative Assembly
- In office 1993–1996
- Preceded by: Munna Singh Chauhan JD
- Succeeded by: Munna Singh Chauhan SP
- Constituency: Chakrata

President Uttarakhand Pradesh Congress Committee
- In office 4 May 2017 – 22 July 2021
- Preceded by: Kishore Upadhyaya
- Succeeded by: Ganesh Godiyal

Personal details
- Born: 11 November 1958 (age 67) Dehradun, Uttar Pradesh, India (now in Uttarakhand, India)
- Party: Indian National Congress
- Website: https://www.pritamsinghinc.in/

Pritam Singh is an Indian politician who is a six-term Member of Legislative Assembly (MLA) from Chakrata, Uttarakhand Legislative Assembly. A member of the Indian National Congress he is serving as Central Election Committee (CEC) Member. He has served as the Leader of Opposition (CLP Leader Uttarakhand) in the Uttarakhand Legislative Assembly and has also served as the president of Uttarakhand Pradesh Congress Committee (Uttarakhand PCC). He is a six-term Member of the Uttarakhand Legislative Assembly. During the Congress government (2002–2007 and 2012–2017) in Uttarakhand he had served as a Cabinet Minister for Home, Rural Development, Food and Civil Supplies, Panchayti Raj and Minor Irrigation in Government of Uttarakhand. He was also elected as a Member of the Uttar Pradesh Legislative Assembly in 1993. Singh represents Chakrata assembly.

== Early life and education ==
Singh was born in Virnad village in Dehradun district of the Uttar Pradesh (now Uttarakhand) on 11 November 1958 in a Jaunsari family. He is the eldest son of Gulab Singh who was a member of the Indian National Congress, an eight term Member of the Uttar Pradesh Legislative Assembly. He is a law graduate and a member of the Bar Council of Uttarakhand. He is married to Anita Singh and has one daughter and one son.

== Positions held ==
Year	Description
1988 - 1993	Block Pramukh - Chakrata
1993 - 1996	Elected to 12th Uttar Pradesh Assembly from Chakrata Assembly
2002 - 2007	Elected to 1st Uttarakhand Assembly from Chakrata Assembly (2nd term): Cabinet Minister - Panchayati Raj, Sports, Rural Engineering, Freedom Fighters, Food & Civil Supplies (2002-07)
2007 - 2012	Elected to 2nd Uttarakhand Assembly from Chakrata Assembly (3rd term): Member - Committee on SC, ST and Other Caste (2007-09); Member - Public Accounts Committee (2008–12); Chairman - Public Accounts Committee (2010–11); Best Legislator Award 2011
2012 - 2017	Elected to 3rd Uttarakhand Assembly from Chakrata Assembly (4th term): Cabinet Minister - Food & Civil Supplies, Minor Irrigation, Rural Development, Panchayati Raj (2012–14); Cabinet Minister - Food & Civil Supplies, Minor Irrigation, Rural Development, Panchayati Raj, Home, Backward Area development (2014–17)
2017 - 2022	Elected to 4th Uttarakhand Assembly from Chakrata Assembly (5th term): Leader of Opposition (2021-22); Member - Public Accounts Committee (2017–22)
2022 - Till date	Elected to 5th Uttarakhand Assembly from Chakrata Assembly (6th term)

== Electoral Performances ==
Year	Election	Party	Constituency Name	Result	Votes gained	Vote share%	Margin	Ref
1991	11th Uttar Pradesh Assembly	Indian National Congress	Chakrata	Lost	29,270	33.14%	6,305	
1993	12th Uttar Pradesh Assembly	Indian National Congress	Chakrata	Won	36,503	30.62%	500	
1996	13th Uttar Pradesh Assembly	Indian National Congress	Chakrata	Lost	35,073	28.11%	15,941	
2002	1st Uttarakhand Assembly	Indian National Congress	Chakrata	Won	18,468	49.59%	8,176	
2007	2nd Uttarakhand Assembly	Indian National Congress	Chakrata	Won	22,504	49.55%	3,741	
2012	3rd Uttarakhand Assembly	Indian National Congress	Chakrata	Won	33,187	50.53%	6,654	
2017	4th Uttarakhand Assembly	Indian National Congress	Chakrata	Won	34,968	48.31%	1,543	
2019	17th Lok Sabha	Indian National Congress	Tehri Garhwal	Lost	2,64,747	30.22%	3,00,586	
2022	5th Uttarakhand Assembly	Indian National Congress	Chakrata	Won	36,853	50.64%	9,436	

Party political offices
Preceded by Kishore Upadhyaya	President; Uttarakhand Pradesh Congress Committee; 4 May 2017 – 22 July 2021	Succeeded by Ganesh Godiyal
