= Nirupama Gaur =

Indian politician

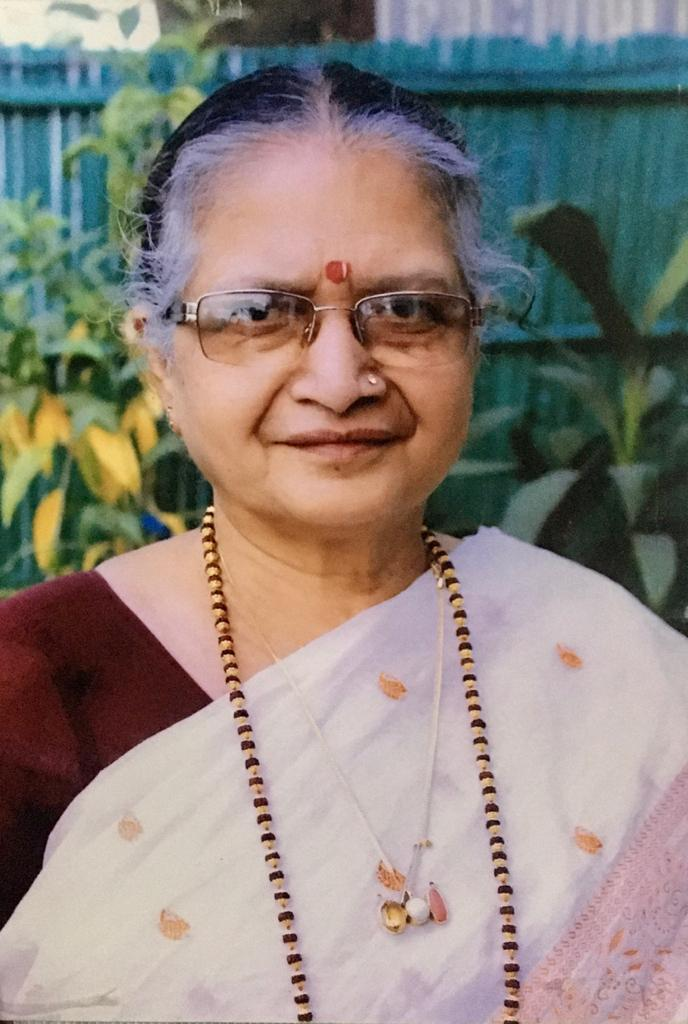

Nirupama Gaur is an Indian politician and member of the Bharatiya Janata Party, as she was also the First Lady minister of Uttarakhand. Nirupama Gaur was a member of the Uttar Pradesh Legislative Council from Lucknow in Uttar Pradesh. She was also the chairperson of Uttarakhand's social welfare board from the year 2008 to 2012. She currently lives with her children and grandchildren in Roorkee, Uttarakhand.
