= Bishan Singh Chuphal =

Indian politician (born 1955)

Bishan Singh Chupal

Minister of Minister of Drinking Water Minister of Rural Construction, Uttarakhand government
- In office 16 March 2021 – 23 March 2022
- Chief Minister: Tirath Singh Rawat; Pushkar Singh Dhami

Minister of Parliamentary affairs, Uttarakhand government
- In office 11 September 2011 – 12 March 2012
- Chief Minister: B.C. Khanduri

Minister of Rural Development & Panchayati Raj Minister of Cooperatives, Uttarakhand government
- In office 27 March 2007 – 26 June 2009
- Chief Minister: B.C. Khanduri

Minister of Forests and wild animals, Environment, Watershed management, Transport, Cooperatives, Protocol, Rural Engineering, Uttarakhand government
- In office 5 July 2009 – 24 December 2009
- Chief Minister: Ramesh Pokhriyal

Member of Uttarakhand Legislative Assembly from the Didihat constituency in Pithoragarh district
- Incumbent
- Assumed office 1996
- Preceded by: Kashi Singh Airy

5th President of Bharatiya Janata Party, Uttarakhand
- In office 13 July 2009 – 8 February 2013
- Preceded by: Bachi Singh Rawat
- Succeeded by: Tirath Singh Rawat

Personal details
- Born: 13 May 1955 (age 71)
- Party: Bharatiya Janata Party
- Education: M.A. and B.Ed. from Kumaun University
- Occupation: politician

Bishan Singh Chuphal (born 13 May 1955), also knowns as Vishan Singh, is an Indian politician from Uttarakhand. He is a six time incumbent member of Uttarakhand Legislative Assembly from the Didihat constituency in Pithoragarh district and is a former cabinet minister of Uttarakhand He is from Bharatiya Janata Party and has served as the President of the Uttarakhand unit of the party. He is one of the few politicians who has not lost an election and is the only person to serve as member of Uttarakhand Legislative Assembly in all the assemblies since its formation in 2000.

== Early life and education ==
He is from Didihat, Pithoragarh District, Uttarakhand. He is the son of Narayan Singh, a farmer. He completed his M.A. in 1976 and B.Ed. in 1977 at Kumaun University, Nainital.

== Personal life ==
Chuphal is married. He has three children. His daughter Deepika Chuphal is the current Zila Parishad vice president of Pithoragarh district and an entrepreneur who gained recognition for leaving a job to start a spices business to create local employment. His elder son Deepak Chuphal is an advocate by profession.

== Career ==
He was given the responsibility of BJP Mandal President in 1980. In 1982, he was elected unopposed as the head of his village. In 1983, he was elected as the Block Pramukh of Didihat Block. He served as the district president of BJP from 1984 to 1990 and then from 1994 to 1996. He came to be known as the people's struggler, due to his simplicity and dedication towards his people.

Chuphal first became an MLA winning the 1996 Uttar Pradesh Legislative Assembly election from Didihat Assembly constituency which was part of UP before the formation of Uttarakhand state. In 1996, he defeated then incumbent Kashi Singh Airy of UKD.

Later, he won the 2002 Uttarakhand Legislative Assembly election representing the Bharatiya Janata Party defeating Ghanshyam Joshi of the UKD. He retained the seat for the third time in the 2007 Uttarakhand Legislative Assembly election defeating Hem Pant of the Indian National Congress. He became cabinet minister in the Khanduri ministry and Pokhriyal ministry. He also served as the state president of BJP Uttarakhand from 2009 to 2013. He won the seat for the fourth consecutive time in the 2012 Uttarakhand Legislative Assembly election defeating Rewati Joshi, of the Indian National Congress. He again won the Didihat seat in the 2017 election beating Kishan Bhandari, an independent candidate. Later he became a cabinet minister in Tirath ministry and Dhami ministry. He won for the sixth consecutive time when he defeated Kishan Bhandari, an independent candidate again in the 2022 Uttarakhand Legislative Assembly election.

== Electoral performance ==
Election	Constituency	Party	Result	Votes %	Opposition Candidate	Opposition Party	Opposition vote %
2022	Didihat	BJP	Won	37.69%	Kishan Bhandari	Independent	31.79%
2017	Didihat	BJP	Won	33.61%	Kishan Bhandari	Independent	29.04%
2012	Didihat	BJP	Won	46.44%	Rewati Joshi	INC	23.06%
2007	Didihat	BJP	Won	31.17%	Hem Pant	INC	25.46%
2002	Didihat	BJP	Won	39.32%	Ghanshyam Joshi	UKD	25.83%
1996	Didihat	BJP	Won	38.12%	Kashi Singh Airy	UKD	30.33%
