= Ajay Bhatt (politician) =

Indian politician (born 1961)

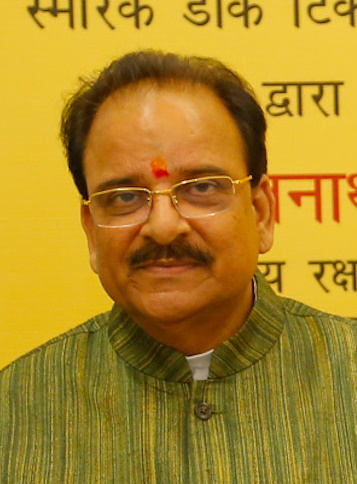
- Bhatt in 2022

Union Minister of State for Defence
- In office 7 July 2021 – 10 June 2024
- Minister: Rajnath Singh
- Preceded by: Shripad Naik
- Succeeded by: Sanjay Seth

Union Minister of State for Tourism
- In office 7 July 2021 – 10 June 2024
- Minister: G. Kishan Reddy
- Preceded by: Prahlad Singh Patel
- Succeeded by: Suresh Gopi

Member of Parliament, Lok Sabha
- Incumbent
- Assumed office 23 May 2019
- Preceded by: Bhagat Singh Koshyari
- Constituency: Nainital–Udhamsingh Nagar, Uttarakhand

Leader of the Opposition in Uttarakhand Legislative Assembly
- In office 2012–2017
- Preceded by: Harak Singh Rawat
- Succeeded by: Indira Hridayesh

Member of Uttarakhand Legislative Assembly
- In office 2012–2017
- Preceded by: Karan Mahara
- Succeeded by: Karan Mahara
- Constituency: Ranikhet
- In office 1996–2007
- Preceded by: Bachi Singh Rawat
- Succeeded by: Karan Mahara
- Constituency: Ranikhet

President of Bharatiya Janata Party, Uttarakhand
- In office 1 January 2016 – 15 January 2020
- Preceded by: Tirath Singh Rawat
- Succeeded by: Banshidhar Bhagat

Personal details
- Born: 1 May 1961 (age 65) Ranikhet, Uttar Pradesh, India (present-day Uttarakhand)
- Party: Bhartiya Janata Party
- Spouse: Pushpa Bhatt (m. 1986)
- Children: 4
- Occupation: Politician; lawyer

Ajay Bhatt (born 1 May 1961) is an Indian politician who has served as the Minister of State in the Ministry of Defence and Ministry of Tourism in Second Modi ministry. He is also a Member of Parliament from Nainital-Udham Singh Nagar. He was State President of the Bharatiya Janata Party in Uttarakhand from 2016 to 2020. Ajay Bhatt defeated former Chief Minister of Uttarakhand and Senior Indian National Congress leader Harish Rawat by a huge margin of 3,39,096 votes in Nainital-Udham Singh Nagar constituency in 2019 General Elections. He was re-elected in 2024.

He has served as the Leader of the Opposition in Uttarakhand Legislative Assembly before state elections in 2017. He held several portfolios in the Government of Uttarakhand as a Minister. He is regarded as one of the senior most BJP leaders of Uttarakhand. He has also served as MLA from Ranikhet Legislative Assembly. He has a nephew named Liladhar Bhatt, who is, unlike him in Congress, and Tarun Bhatt, his other nephew also supports Ajay Bhatt. Ajay Bhatt was known for the slogan "Sabki ek hi ratt..Ajay Bhatt..Ajay Bhatt", meaning everybody's chariot, ajay bhatt, ajay bhatt during Uttrakhand state elections in 2017.

== Electoral performance ==
Election	Constituency	Party	Result	Votes %	Opposition Candidate	Opposition Party	Opposition vote %	Ref
Lok Sabha
2024	Nainital-Udhamsingh Nagar	BJP	Won	61.03%	Prakash Joshi	INC	34.61%	
2019	Nainital-Udhamsingh Nagar	BJP	Won	61.35%	Harish Rawat	INC	34.41%	
Uttarakhand Legislative Assembly
2017	Ranikhet	BJP	Lost	34.13%	Karan Mahara	INC	46.23%	
2012	Ranikhet	BJP	Won	35.66%	Karan Mahara	INC	35.46%	
2007	Ranikhet	BJP	Lost	36.27%	Karan Mahara	INC	36.83%	
2002	Ranikhet	BJP	Won	33.75%	Pooran Singh	INC	26.13%	
