= Mohan Singh Rawat =

Indian politician (died 2023)

Mohan Singh Rawat (died 8 December 2023) was an Indian politician and member of the Bharatiya Janata Party. Rawat was a member of the Uttarakhand Legislative Assembly from the Pauri constituency in Pauri Garhwal district. Rawat died on 8 December 2023.
