= Banshidhar Bhagat =

Indian politician

Bansidhar Bhagat

State cabinet minister, Government of Uttarakhand
- In office 12 March 2021 – 23 March 2022
- In office 2007–2012
- In office 2000–2002

Member of Uttarakhand Legislative Assembly
- Incumbent
- Assumed office 2012
- Preceded by: Constituency established
- Constituency: Kaladhungi
- In office 2007–2012
- Preceded by: Indira Hridayesh
- Succeeded by: Indira Hridayesh
- Constituency: Haldwani
- In office 1991–2002
- Preceded by: Kishan Singh Taragi
- Succeeded by: Narayan Singh Jantwal
- Constituency: Nainital

8th President of Bharatiya Janata Party, Uttarakhand
- In office 16 January 2020 – 12 March 2021
- Preceded by: Ajay Bhatt
- Succeeded by: Madan Kaushik

Personal details
- Born: 9 August 1949 (age 77)
- Party: Bharatiya Janata Party

Banshidhar Bhagat (born 9 August 1949) is an Indian politician and member of the Bharatiya Janata Party. Bhagat is a member of the Uttarakhand Legislative Assembly from the Kaladhungi (Uttarakhand Assembly constituency) in Nainital district. Previously, he was the state president of BJP Uttarakhand unit. Also, he served as Cabinet Minister of Uttarakhand government. Bhagat was also a member of the Uttarakhand Legislative Assembly from the Haldwani (Uttarakhand Assembly constituency) and Nainital (Uttarakhand Assembly constituency) in Nainital district.

== Political career ==
Bhagat was first elected to the Uttar Pradesh legislative assembly in 1991 as a member of the Bharatiya Janata Party from Nainital Assembly constituency. He was subsequently re-elected from Nainital in 1993 and 1996. In 1996, he became a minister of state in U.P. Government. In 2000, he became a cabinet minister in Swami and Koshyari governments. In 2002, he shifted to Haldwani Assembly constituency, but he lost to Indira Hridayesh. In 2007, he defeated Indira Hridayesh from Haldwani Assembly constituency and became a cabinet minister. In 2012, he shifted to the newly formed Kaladhungi Assembly constituency and won. He was re-elected in 2017. He was later appointed as the president of BJP, Uttarakhand and served in that post from 2020 to 2021. In 2021, he was made a cabinet minister in the Uttarakhand government. He was re-elected from Kaladhungi in 2022.
