= Haldwani Assembly constituency =

Constituency of the Uttarakhand legislative assembly in India

Coordinates: 29.22°N 79.52°E

Haldwani
- Constituency No. 59 for the Uttarakhand Legislative Assembly

Constituency details
- Country: India
- Region: North India
- State: Uttarakhand
- District: Nainital
- Lok Sabha constituency: Nainital–Udhamsingh Nagar
- Total electors: 151,396
- Reservation: None

Member of Legislative Assembly
- 5th Uttarakhand Legislative Assembly
- Incumbent Sumit Hridayesh
- Party: Indian National Congress
- Elected year: 2022

Haldwani Legislative Assembly constituency is one of the seventy electoral Uttarakhand Legislative Assembly constituencies of Uttarakhand state in India. It includes ward no. 1 to 33 of Haldwani Municipal Corporation of Nainital District.

Haldwani Legislative Assembly constituency is a part of Nainital-Udhamsingh Nagar (Lok Sabha constituency).

== Members of Legislative Assembly ==
Election	Name	Party
1977	Dev Bahadur Singh	Indian National Congress
1980	Akbar Ahmad	Indian National Congress
1985	Moti Ram	Indian National Congress
1989	Narayan Datt Tiwari	Indian National Congress
1991	Narayan Datt Tiwari	Indian National Congress
1993	Tilak Raj Behar	Bharatiya Janata Party
1996	Tilak Raj Behar	Bharatiya Janata Party
Major boundary changes
2002	Indira Hridayesh	Indian National Congress
2007	Banshidhar Bhagat	Bharatiya Janata Party
Major boundary changes
2012	Indira Hridayesh	Indian National Congress
2017	Indira Hridayesh	Indian National Congress
2022	Sumit Hridayesh	Indian National Congress

== Election results ==
=== 2027 Assembly election ===
2027 Uttarakhand Legislative Assembly election: Haldwani
Party	Candidate	Votes	%	±%
INC				
BJP				
NOTA	None of the above			
Majority				
Turnout				
gain from		Swing		

=== Assembly Election 2022 ===
2022 Uttarakhand Legislative Assembly election: Haldwani
Party	Candidate	Votes	%	±%
INC	Sumit Hridayesh	50,116	50.18%	▲3.75
BJP	Dr. Jogender Pal Singh Rautela	42,302	42.36%	▲2.88
SP	Shoeb Ahmed	2,196	2.20%	▼8.76
AAP	Samit Tikkoo	1,759	1.76%	New
AIMIM	Abdul Mateen Siddiqui	910	0.91%	New
BSP	Jitendra Singh	741	0.74%	▼0.66
NOTA	None of the above	567	0.57%	▼0.13
Margin of victory		7,814	7.82%	▲0.87
Turnout		99,869	65.71%	▼1.46
Registered electors		1,51,985		▲8.25
INC hold		Swing	▲3.75	

=== Assembly Election 2017 ===
2017 Uttarakhand Legislative Assembly election: Haldwani
Party	Candidate	Votes	%	±%
INC	Indira Hridayesh	43,786	46.43%	▼6.42
BJP	Dr. Jogender Pal Singh Rautela	37,229	39.47%	▲15.87
SP	Shoeb Ahmed	10,337	10.96%	▼5.72
BSP	Shakeel Ahmad	1,324	1.40%	▼2.37
NOTA	None of the above	655	0.69%	New
Margin of victory		6,557	6.95%	▼22.28
Turnout		94,312	67.17%	▼3.13
Registered electors		1,40,407		▲22.37
INC hold		Swing	▼6.42	

=== Assembly Election 2012 ===
2012 Uttarakhand Legislative Assembly election: Haldwani
Party	Candidate	Votes	%	±%
INC	Indira Hridayesh	42,627	52.85%	▲20.74
BJP	Renu Adhikari	19,044	23.61%	▼12.37
SP	Abdul Mateen Siddiqui	13,453	16.68%	▼0.71
BSP	Raisul Hasan	3,043	3.77%	▲2.03
Independent	Mohmmad Asad Raza	617	0.76%	New
Margin of victory		23,583	29.24%	▲25.35
Turnout		80,664	70.30%	▲2.83
Registered electors		1,14,739		▼29.02
INC gain from BJP		Swing	▲16.86	

=== Assembly Election 2007 ===
2007 Uttarakhand Legislative Assembly election: Haldwani
Party	Candidate	Votes	%	±%
BJP	Banshidhar Bhagat	39,248	35.98%	▲2.81
INC	Indira Hridayesh	35,013	32.10%	▼6.08
SP	Abdul Mateen Siddiqui	18,967	17.39%	▲1.74
Independent	Mohan Pathak	10,361	9.50%	New
BSP	Munna Lal Sahu	1,904	1.75%	▼3.35
Independent	Sushil Bhatt	876	0.80%	New
UKD	Harish Singh	702	0.64%	New
Independent	Prem Prakash Belwal	587	0.54%	New
Margin of victory		4,235	3.88%	▼1.12
Turnout		1,09,074	67.52%	▲18.47
Registered electors		1,61,650		▲29.66
BJP gain from INC		Swing	▼2.19	

=== Assembly Election 2002 ===
2002 Uttaranchal Legislative Assembly election: Haldwani
Party	Candidate	Votes	%	±%
INC	Indira Hridayesh	23,327	38.18%	New
BJP	Banshidhar Bhagat	20,269	33.17%	New
SP	Abdul Mateen Siddiqui	9,563	15.65%	New
BSP	Abdul Qavi	3,113	5.09%	New
Independent	Naveen Tiwari	1,293	2.12%	New
Independent	Diwan Singh Bisht	1,212	1.98%	New
Independent	Khjan Chandra	695	1.14%	New
Independent	Laxman Singh Mehra	583	0.95%	New
Shivsena	Amit Agrawal	402	0.66%	New
Independent	Tej Singh	320	0.52%	New
Margin of victory		3,058	5.00%	
Turnout		61,103	49.08%	
Registered electors		1,24,677		
INC win (new seat)				
