= Narayan Ram Das =

Indian politician

Narayan Ram Das is an Indian politician and member of the Bharatiya Janata Party. Das was a member of the Uttarakhand Legislative Assembly from the Bageshwar constituency in Bageshwar District. He served as the Minister of State for Uttaranchal Development in Kalyan Singh's cabinet from September 1997 to November 1999.
