= Tirath Singh Rawat =

9th Chief Minister of Uttarakhand

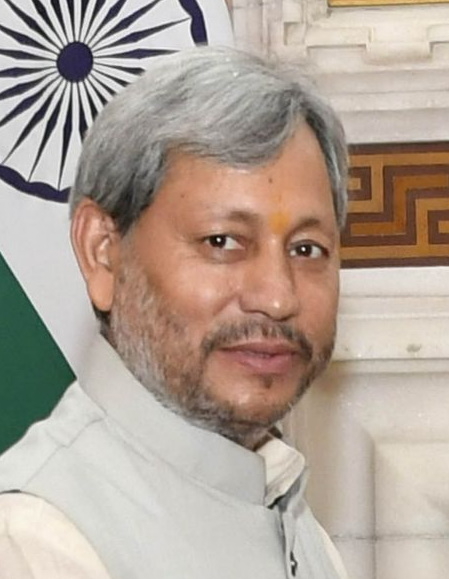

9th Chief Minister of Uttarakhand
- In office 10 March 2021 – 01 July 2021
- Preceded by: Trivendra Singh Rawat
- Succeeded by: Pushkar Singh Dhami

Member of Parliament, Lok Sabha
- In office 30 May 2019 – 4 June 2024
- Preceded by: B. C. Khanduri
- Succeeded by: Anil Baluni
- Constituency: Garhwal

Member of Vidhan Sabha, Uttarakhand
- In office 2012–2017
- Succeeded by: Satpal Maharaj
- Constituency: Chaubattakhal

Minister of Education, Uttarakhand
- In office 2000–2002
- Chief Minister: Nityanand Swami

6th President of the Bharatiya Janata Party, Uttarakhand
- In office 9 February 2013 – 31 December 2015
- Preceded by: Bishan Singh Chuphal
- Succeeded by: Ajay Bhatt

Personal details
- Born: 9 April 1964 (age 62) Seeron, Pauri Garhwal district, Uttar Pradesh (now Uttarakhand, India)
- Party: Bharatiya Janata Party
- Other political affiliations: National Democratic Alliance
- Spouse: Rashmi Tyagi Rawat
- Children: One daughter
- Education: Hemwati Nandan Bahuguna Garhwal University
- Website: Official website

Tirath Singh Rawat (born 9 April 1964) is an Indian politician, a former Chief Minister of Uttarakhand and former Member of Parliament from Lok Sabha. He served as CM and former leader of the house in state legislative assembly in 2021. He was elected to the 17th Lok Sabha from the Garhwal constituency in the 2019 Indian general election as member of the Bharatiya Janata Party. He was the state president of Bharatiya Janata Party Uttarakhand from February 2013 to December 2015 and former member of Uttarakhand Legislative Assembly from Chaubattakhal constituency from 2012 to 2017. He was also the first Education Minister of Uttarakhand.

== Early life and education ==
Tirath Singh Rawat was born to a Hindu Rajput family in 1964 in the Pauri Garhwal district of Uttar Pradesh (now in Uttarakhand), India. His father was Kalam Singh Rawat and his mother Gaura Devi. He holds a Master's degree in sociology and a diploma in journalism.

== Career ==
Rawat entered active student politics and became the organizational secretary of ABVP Uttarakhand unit and later national secretary of ABVP. He was also the student union president at Hemwati Nandan Bahuguna Garhwal University in 1992. Subsequently, he became the state vice-president of Uttar Pradesh Bharatiya Janata Yuva Morcha. He worked for Rashtriya Swayamsevak Sangh as a key worker, known as a pracharak, from 1983 to 1988.

He was the state vice-president of Uttar Pradesh Bharatiya Janata Yuva Morcha.

In 1997, he was elected as a member of Uttar Pradesh Legislative Council and was elected as legislature leader of BJP in the legislative council of Uttar Pradesh.

He was the first education minister of the newly formed state Uttarakhand.

After this, he was elected as state general secretary of Uttarakhand in 2007 and after that state chief electoral officer and state membership chief.

In 2012, he was elected as legislative assembly member (MLA) and in 2013 he became Uttarakhand BJP supremo.

As Uttarakhand BJP president, he won four of six BJP mayoral posts in municipal corporation elections. He was elected as MP from Garhwal Lok Sabha constituency on 23 May 2019. He defeated his nearest rival Manish Khanduri by more than 3.50 lakh votes.

He took oath as the Chief Minister of Uttarakhand on 10 March 2021. At the time, Rawat was a member of the Lok Sabha representing Pauri Garhwal, but not a member of the Uttarakhand state assembly. Under the constitution, to remain as Chief Minister of Uttarakhand, he needed to be elected to the state assembly within six months of being appointed Chief Minister (i.e. by 10 September 2021). Rawat did not contest the by-election for the Salt Assembly constituency seat in April 2021, in part because Rawat had tested positive for COVID-19 on 22 March 2021. There were two subsequent vacancies in the state assembly, but these occurred less than a year before the term of the assembly was due to end on 22 March 2022, and by-elections are not meant to be held in the last year of the assembly's term of office. Since Rawat could not get elected to the state assembly within the deadline, he and his cabinet colleagues resigned on 2 July 2021.

== Controversies ==
=== Narendra Modi as the avatar of Rama and Krishna ===
In March 2021, at a function organised by Hans Foundation, Rawat said, "The way people started considering Lord Ram and Krishna as gods in Dvapara and Treta yugas because of their works, in the same way, Prime Minister Narendra Modi will be considered as Lord Ram and Krishna in times to come." Leaders from the opposition party of Congress claimed this is sycophancy and criticised him for his remarks.

=== Views on women's clothing ===
In March 2021, Tirath Singh Rawat created controversy by saying that he was shocked to see a woman running an NGO in ripped jeans, and was concerned about the example she was setting for society. Priyanka Gandhi criticised Rawat on his remarks and also posted photos of Prime Minister Narendra Modi and Union Minister Nitin Gadkari in white shirts and khaki shorts (RSS uniform).

Rawat later apologised for his controversial remarks and added he has no problem with jeans. But he maintained his objections to ripped jeans, claiming wearing "torn" ones is "not right."

=== Colonisation of India ===
Shortly after taking office as Chief Minister, Rawat said that India was handling the COVID-19 pandemic better than the United States, which had enslaved India for two hundred years. It sparked outrage as it was the British Empire that had colonised India, and not the United States.

=== COVID-19 pandemic ===
Rawat took heavy criticism for his decision to pursue the Haridwar Kumbh Mela in Haridwar without any restrictions related to COVID-19. Rawat disputed the effects of COVID-19, saying that "Maa Ganga's blessings" would prevent ill effects. The 2021 Kumbh Mela gravely exacerbated the COVID-19 pandemic in India, and more than a thousand devotees tested positive for COVID-19 at the event. He also drew a distinction of the Kumbh Mela gathering and Tablighi gathering in Delhi during the preceding year, saying the latter was 'all inside a building' while Kumbh Mela is 'out in the open'. The Uttarakhand High Court criticised his decision to proceed with the Kumbh Mela under this circumstance. The Chota Char Dham Yatra, a tour of four holy sites in Uttarakhand, was suspended on 30 April due to the rise in cases of COVID-19.

=== Comments on corruption in Uttarakhand ===
In November 2022, Rawat stated that corruption was a major problem in the state. Speaking at a public event, he said that corruption has become a significant concern and called for greater efforts to address it. His remarks attracted attention because they were critical of the functioning of the state administration despite his affiliation with the ruling BJP.

== Awards ==
- Newsmakers Achievers Awards 2022

Political offices
Preceded by Trivendra Singh Rawat	Chief Minister of Uttarakhand; 10 March 2021 - 4 July 2021	Succeeded by Pushkar Singh Dhami
