= Harak Singh Rawat =

Indian politician

Dr. Harak Singh Rawat
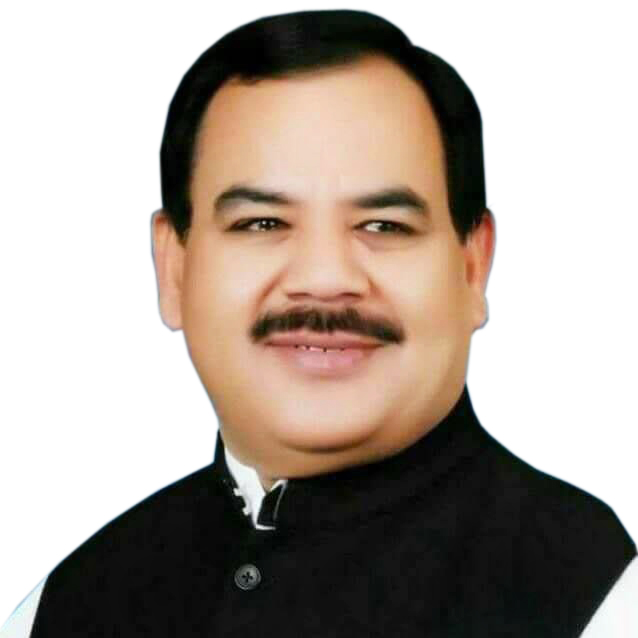

Cabinet Minister to the Government of Uttarakhand
- In office March 2017 – January 2022
- Chief Minister: Trivendra Singh Rawat; Tirath Singh Rawat; Pushkar Singh Dhami

Member of the Uttarakhand Legislative Assembly
- In office 2017 – January 2022
- Constituency: Kotdwar

Personal details
- Born: 15 December 1960 (age 65) Srinagar, Uttarakhand, India
- Party: Indian National Congress (1998- 2017 and 2022-present)
- Other political affiliations: Bharatiya Janata Party (2017- 16 Jan 2022) ((until 1998))

Dr. Harak Singh Rawat (born 15 December 1960) is a prominent political leader of the Uttarakhand state in India. He is a member of Indian National Congress after being expelled from the BJP in 2022. He became the youngest Minister of Uttar Pradesh State in the year 1991 and also won assembly election from Pauri as a member of the Bharatiya Janata Party. He has also won as an MLA from Rudraprayag, Lansdowne and Kotdwar and is one of the few leaders in the state with a wide appeal in a large area. He unsuccessfully contested as a candidate of Indian National Congress from Garhwal in 2014 Indian general election. He was expelled from BJP and the Cabinet led by Pushkar Singh Dhami stating that he has indulged in anti-party activities as he was demanding ticket for the Uttarakhand Assembly Elections 2022. He later joined Congress in the presence of former Uttarakhand CM Harish Rawat.

== Early life and education ==
Rawat completed postgraduate work in arts in 1984 and earned his Doctor of Philosophy in Military Science from Hemwati Nandan Bahuguna Garhwal University, Srinagar, Uttarakhand in 1996.

== Controversies ==
Supreme Court of India held Mr Rawat and divisional forest officer(DFO) Kishan Chand responsible for felling of thousands of trees in Corbett Tiger Reserve and causing damage to the environment. It said “In blatant disregard of the law and for commercial purposes the then forest minister and DFO Kishan Chand indulged in illicit felling of trees on a mass scale to construct buildings on pretext of tourism promotion". The Supreme Court further directed the state government to restore the forest back to its original condition and recoup the costs from the minister and the DFO .

Mr. Rawat has also been accused of protecting the DFO by giving him postings against the forest secretary recommendation of suspending him due to irregularities allegations against the DFO in his prior postings.

== Politics ==
- In 2017 elected from Kotdwara Uttarakhand Vidhan Sabha
- In 2012 elected from Rudraprayag Uttarakhand Vidhan Sabha
- In 2007 elected as Leader of opposition Uttarakhand Vidhan Sabha
- In 2007 was re-elected from Lansdowne Uttarakhand Vidhan Sabha
- In 2002 after winning from Lansdowne Constituency was designated Cabinet Minister of four departments – Revenue, Food & Civil Supplies, Disaster Management and Rehabilitation
- In 2002 was elected as MLA from 32 Lansdowne Vidhan Sabha Constituency
- In 1997 was appointed member of Uttar Pradesh Congress Working Committee
- From 1997–present member of Uttar Pradesh Congress Committee
- In 1997 was appointed vice-chairman (Equivalent to Cabinet Minister Rank) in Uttar Pradesh Khadi Gram Udyog Board
- In 1993 was re-elected as M.L.A. from Pauri Assembly
- From 1991 to 1993 was youngest Tourism Minister in U.P.
- In 1991 won assembly election from Pauri and became youngest Minister of U.P. State

== Positions held ==
Year	Description
1991–1993	Elected to 11th Uttar Pradesh Assembly from Pauri Assembly (1st term): Minister of State for Tourism, Government of Uttar Pradesh (19 July 1991 - 6 Dec 1992)
1993–1995	Elected to 12th Uttar Pradesh Assembly from Pauri Assembly (2nd term)
2002–2007	Elected to 1st Uttarakhand Assembly from Lansdowne Assembly (3rd term): Cabinet Minister
2007–2012	Elected to 2nd Uttarakhand Assembly from Lansdowne Assembly (4th term): Leader of Opposition
2012–2017	Elected to 3rd Uttarakhand Assembly from Rudraprayag Assembly (5th term): Cabinet Minister
2017–2022	Elected to 4th Uttarakhand Assembly from Kotdwar Assembly (6th term): Cabinet Minister

== Electoral Performances ==
Year	Election	Party	Constituency Name	Result	Votes gained	Vote share%	Margin	Ref
1989	10th Uttar Pradesh Assembly	BJP	Pauri	Lost	3,375	5.00%	18,312	
1991	11th Uttar Pradesh Assembly	BJP	Pauri	Won	31,997	48.70%	10,692	
1993	12th Uttar Pradesh Assembly	BJP	Pauri	Won	28,585	39.70%	5,326	
1996	13th Uttar Pradesh Assembly	JD	Pauri	Lost	18,816	22.60%	27,416	
1998	12th Lok Sabha	BSP	Garhwal	Lost	41,268	8.16%	2,38,990	
2002	1st Uttarakhand Assembly	INC	Lansdowne	Won	8,914	34.45%	468	
2007	2nd Uttarakhand Assembly	INC	Lansdowne	Won	12,899	41.97%	3,818	
2012	3rd Uttarakhand Assembly	INC	Rudraprayag	Won	15,469	29.01%	1,326	
2014	16th Lok Sabha	INC	Garhwal	Lost	2,21,164	32.43%	1,84,526	
2017	4th Uttarakhand Assembly	BJP	Kotdwar	Won	39,859	56.06%	11,318	
