= Indira Hridayesh =

Indian politician (1941–2021)

Dr. Indira Hridayesh
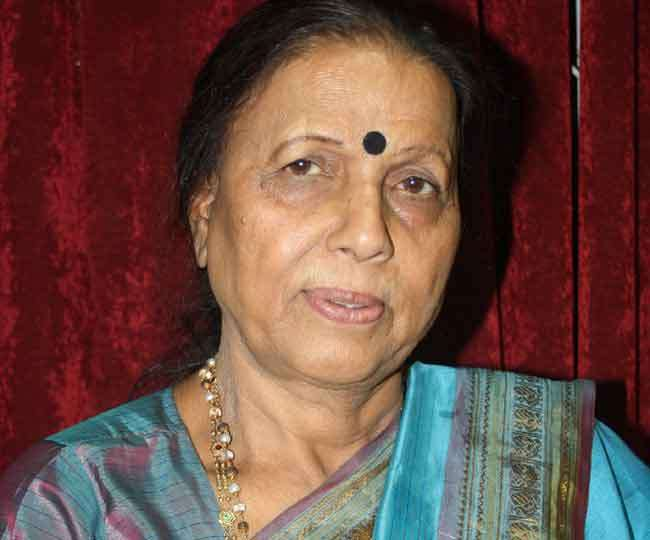

Leader of the Opposition Uttarakhand Legislative Assembly
- In office 27 March 2017 – 13 June 2021
- Preceded by: Ajay Bhatt
- Succeeded by: Pritam Singh

Member of Legislative Assembly for Haldwani
- In office 2012 – 13 June 2021
- Preceded by: Banshidhar Bhagat
- Succeeded by: Sumit Hridayesh
- In office 2002–2007
- Preceded by: Tilak Raj Behar
- Succeeded by: Banshidhar Bhagat

Personal details
- Born: 24 March 1941 Allahabad, United Provinces, British India (now in Uttar Pradesh, India)
- Died: 13 June 2021 (aged 80) Delhi, India
- Party: Indian National Congress
- Spouse: Hridayesh Kumar

Indira Hridayesh (24 March 1941 – 13 June 2021) was an Indian politician, from the state of Uttarakhand. She was a member of the Indian National Congress party. Hridayesh was elected to the Uttar Pradesh Legislative Council for four terms, from 1974 to 2000. She was elected to the Uttarakhand Legislative Assembly in 2002, 2012, and 2017. Between 2014 and 2017, she was the State Finance Minister for Uttarakhand. From 2017 till her death in 2021, she was the leader of the Opposition for the Uttarakhand Legislative Assembly.

== Biography ==
Hridayesh was born on 24 March 1941, either in Allahabad or in Pilbhit, in Uttar Pradesh, according to sources. Her family was from Dasauli, in Uttar Pradesh. She had a master's degree and a doctorate. She had three sons. She was diagnosed with COVID-19, and underwent cardiac surgery in 2021. She died on 13 June 2021, of cardiac arrest.

== Career ==
Hridayesh entered active politics in the mid-1970s, as part of the Indian National Congress (INC) party. She won her first election in 1974, to the upper house of the state of Uttar Pradesh's bicameral legislature, i.e. the Uttar Pradesh Legislative Council. She won second, third and fourth terms to the Uttar Pradesh Legislative Council from 1986 to 1992, 1992–1998, and 1998–2000. Hridayesh represented Haldwani constituency, which was in undivided Uttar Pradesh. In 2000, after Uttar Pradesh was divided into smaller states, she became a member of the Interim Uttaranchal Assembly for the new state of Uttarakhand. She won three more terms to the Uttarakhand Legislative Assembly, from 2002 to 2007, 2012–2017, and 2017-2021 but lost in 2007 to Banshidhar Bhagat. During her last term, she was leader of the opposition for the Uttarakhand Legislative Assembly.

From 2012 to 2017, she was the Minister of Finance for Uttarakhand, and also held the portfolio for parliamentary affairs, higher education, and planning, serving in successive governments headed by ND Tiwari, Vijay Bahuguna, and Harish Rawat. In 2014, she suggested that she would be a suitable candidate for Chief Minister of Uttarakhand, to replace the then-Chief Minister, Vijay Bahuguna, but her proposal was not accepted by the INC.

Hridayesh was considered an expert on parliamentary procedure, and was a key strategist for the INC in Uttarakhand politics.

== Electoral history ==
Hridayesh's electoral history is:

Year	Description
1974–1980	Elected to Uttar Pradesh Legislative Council (1st Term)
1986–1992	Elected to Uttar Pradesh Legislative Council (2nd Term)
1992–1998	Elected to Uttar Pradesh Legislative Council (3rd Term)
1998–2000	Elected to Uttar Pradesh Legislative Council (4th Term)
2000–2002	Member Interim Uttaranchal Assembly: Leader of the Opposition Uttarakhand Legislative Assembly
2002–2007	Elected to Uttarakhand Legislative Assembly (1st Term): Cabinet Minister for Public Works, Parliamentary Affairs, State Assets, Information, Science & Technology
2007	Lost from Haldwani to Banshidhar Bhagat
2012–2017	Elected to Uttarakhand Legislative Assembly (2nd Term): Cabinet Minister for Finance, Commercial Tax, Stamps and Registration, Entertainment Tax, Parliamentary Affairs, Legislative Affairs, Election, Census, Language, Protocol
2017 – 2021	Elected to Uttarakhand Legislative Assembly (3rd Term): Leader of the Opposition Uttarakhand Legislative Assembly
