= Nityanand Swami (politician) =

1st Chief Minister of Uttaranchal

1st Chief Minister of Uttaranchal
- In office 9 November 2000 – 29 October 2001
- Preceded by: Office Established
- Succeeded by: Bhagat Singh Koshyari

Chairman of the Uttar Pradesh Legislative Council
- In office 23 May 1996 – 8 November 2000
- Preceded by: Shiv Prasad Gupta
- Succeeded by: Om Prakash Sharma (acting)

Personal details
- Born: Nityanand Sharma; 27 December 1927 Narnaul, Punjab, British India (now in Haryana, India)
- Died: 12 December 2012 (aged 84) Dehradun, Uttarakhand, India
- Party: Bharatiya Janata Party
- Spouse: Chandrakanta Sharma
- Children: 4

Nityanand Swami (born Nityanand Sharma, 27 December 1927 – 12 December 2012) was the chief minister of the Indian state of Uttarakhand, named Uttaranchal during his administration. He was the first chief minister of the state, serving from 9 November 2000 to 29 October 2001.

== Early life and education ==
Swami was born in Narnaul, Haryana and spent almost all his life in Dehradun where his father served in Forest Research Institute. He entered the Freedom Struggle at an early age, under the umbrella of Rashtriya Swayamsevak Sangh, and contributed in the local resistances at Dehradun. Swami, as he was known among his friends was not only an intellectual but also a debater and spokesman. He was declared all round student of Dayanand Anglo-Vedic College, Dehradun in year 1949-52. In the 1950s and 1960s he was a worker of Bharatiya Jan Sangh and president of various trade unions; he preferred the non violent hunger strike Satyagraha in contrast to violent strikes of Bandh.

== Political career ==
Lawyer by profession, Swami entered active politics under the Bharatiya Jan Sangh. He had switched to the Indian National Congress for a brief period of time and to the Bharatiya Janata Party since then. As many as 18 times he was put in prison by the establishment when he supported the cause of struggling labourers. He participated in a number of hunger strikes.

In 1969 Swami was first elected as a member of Uttar Pradesh Legislative Assembly from the Dehradun constituency. In 1984, he was elected into the Uttar Pradesh Legislative Council from the graduate constituency of Garhwal and Kumaon. Swami represented the constituency of Garhwal and Kumaon for three years. He became Deputy Chairman of the Legislative Council of Uttar Pradesh in 1991 and was unanimously elected the Chairman of the same in 1992. Swami was elected the chairman of the U.P. legislative council in 1992.

Swami worked behind the scenes in the struggle for a separate Uttaranchal state. As the chairman of the council, he pursued matter and policies to uplift the qualities in these fields through various umbrella NGOs. He was honoured with the "Pride of the Doon" Award from Doon Citizen Council, Dehradun, in recognition of distinguished contributions to the region. The soft-spoken Swami was honoured with the Uttar Pradesh Ratna in 2000 for the dedicated public work on "Rashtrabhasha" Hindi. He was awarded the Sahitya Bharati by Hindi Prachar Samiti in 1994.

=== Chief Minister ===
On 9 November 2000, Nityanand Swami took the oath as the first chief minister of the new state of Uttaranchal (now Uttarakhand). He was asked by the Bharatiya Janata Party leadership to acquire the newly created office of Chief Minister. He served from 9 November 2000 to 29 October 2001 in the office and then resigned voluntarily in favor of Bhagat Singh Koshyari when asked by the BJP leadership.

== Personal life ==
He was married to Chandrakanta Swami and had four daughters.

== Death ==
He died at the age of 84, at the Combined Medical Institute (CMI), Dehradun on 12 December 2012.

Preceded by Post created	Chief Minister of Uttaranchal; 2000–2001	Succeeded by B. S. Koshyari
