= Uttarakhand Council of Ministers =

Executive branch of government in a state in India

The Uttarakhand Council of Ministers is the executive wing of Government of Uttarakhand and headed by Chief Minister of Uttarakhand, who is the head of government and leader of the state cabinet. The term of every executive wing is for five years. The council of ministers are assisted by department secretaries attached to each ministry who are from IAS Uttarakhand Cadre. The chief executive officer responsible for issuing orders on behalf of government is Chief Secretary to the state government. The current Chief Secretary is Anand Bardhan who took charge on 1 April 2025.

== Constitutional requirement ==
=== For the Council of Ministers to aid and advise Governor ===
According to Article 163 of the Constitution of India,

There shall be a Council of Ministers with the Chief Minister at the head to aid and advise the Governor in the exercise of his function, except in so far as he is by or under this Constitution required to exercise his functions or any of them in his discretion.

1. If any question arises whether any matter is or is not a matter as respects which the Governor is by or under this Constitution required to act in his discretion, the decision of the Governor in his discretion shall be final, and the validity of anything done by the Governor shall not be called in question on the ground that he ought or ought not to have acted in his discretion.
2. The question whether any, and if so what, advice was tendered by Ministers to the Governor shall not be inquired into in any court.

This means that the Ministers serve under the pleasure of the Governor and he/she may remove them, on the advice of the Chief Minister, whenever they want.

=== For other provisions as to Ministers ===
According to Article 164 of the Constitution of India,

The Chief Minister shall be appointed by the Governor and the other Ministers shall be appointed by the Governor on the advice of the Chief Minister, and the Minister shall hold office during the pleasure of the Governor:
Provided that in the States of Bihar, Madhya Pradesh and Orissa, there shall be a Minister in charge of tribal welfare who may in addition be in charge of the welfare of the Scheduled Castes and backward classes or any other work.

1. The Council of Minister shall be collectively responsible to the Legislative Assembly of the State.
2. Before a Minister enters upon his office, the Governor shall administer to him the oaths of office and of secrecy according to the forms set out for the purpose in the Third Schedule.
3. A Minister who for any period of six consecutive months is not a member of the Legislature of the State shall at the expiration of that period cease to be a Minister.
4. The salaries and allowances of Ministers shall be such as the Legislature of the State may from time to time by law determine and, until the Legislature of the State so determines, shall be a specified in the Second Schedule.

== Chief Minister ==
Like any Indian state, Chief Ministers of Uttarakhand is the real head of the government and responsible for state administration. He is the leader of the parliamentary party in the legislature and heads the state cabinet. The current Chief Minister is Pushkar Singh Dhami.

== State Cabinet ==
As per the Constitution of India, all portfolios of state government is vested in Chief Minister, who distribute various portfolio to individual ministers whom he nominates to the State Governor. The state governor appoints individual ministers for various portfolios and departments as per advice of Chief Minister and together form the State Cabinet. As the original portfolios are vested with CM, who delegates to others upon his/her wish, actions of individual ministers are part of collective responsibility of the state cabinet and Chief Minister is responsible for actions of each minister. The state cabinet along with Chief Minister, prepares General policy and individual department policy, which will be guiding policy for day-to-day administration of each minister.

=== Current Cabinet ===
This is the current Cabinet of Uttarakhand headed by the Chief Minister of Uttarakhand, Pushkar Singh Dhami:

Colour key for parties
Bharatiya Janata Party

№	Name	Constituency	Departments		Party
Chief Minister
1	Pushkar Singh Dhami	Champawat	Confidential (Council of Ministers); Establishment of Personnel and All India Services; Alertness, Swaraj, Corruption Elimination and Public Service; Secretariat Administration; General Administration; Planning; State Property; Information; Homes, Prisons, Citizen Protection and Home Guard, Military Welfare; Revenue; Industrial Development (Mining); Industrial Development; Labor	Drinking Water; Energy and Alternative Energy; Excise; Justice; Civil Aviation; Finance Commercial, Stamp and Registration; Housing	BJP
Cabinet Ministers
2	Satpal Maharaj	Chaubattakhal	Public Works Department; Panchayati Raj; Rural Construction; Tourism; Minor Irrigation	Culture; India-Nepal River Projects; Irrigation; Charity	BJP
3	Ganesh Joshi	Mussoorie	Agriculture	Agricultural Marketing; Agricultural Processing; Agricultural Education; Plantation and Horticulture; Silk Development; Bio Technology; Sainik Welfare; Rural Development	BJP
4	Dhan Singh Rawat	Srinagar	Education	Primary Education; Secondary Education; Sanskrit Education; Cooperative; Higher Education	BJP
5	Subodh Uniyal	Narendranagar	Forest; Elections; Technical Education; Parliamentary Affairs; Medical Health; Medical Education		BJP
6	Rekha Arya	Someshwar	Women and Child Development; Food and Civil Supplies; Consumer Affairs	Sports; Youth Welfare	BJP
7	Saurabh Bahuguna	Sitarganj	Animal Husbandry; Milk Development; Fisheries	Sugarcane Development; Sugar industry; Protocol; Employment	BJP
8	Madan Kaushik	Haridwar	Panchayati Raj; Disaster Management and Rehabilitation; Ayush and Ayush Education	Reorganization; Census	BJP
9	Bharat Singh Chaudhary	Rudraprayag	Rural Development; Small and Micro-Medium Enterprises	Khadi and Village Industries	BJP
10	Khajan Dass	Rajpur Road	Social Welfare; Minority Welfare	Student Welfare; Language	BJP
11	Pradip Batra	Roorkee	Transportation; Information Technology and Good Governance	Science and Technology; Biotechnology	BJP
12	Ram Singh Kaira	Bhimtal	Urban Development; Environmental Protection and Climate Change	Watershed Management	BJP

== Oath as the state chief minister/minister ==
I, <Name of Chief Minister/Minister>, do swear in the name of God/solemnly affirm that I will bear true faith and allegiance to the Constitution of India as by law established, that I will uphold the sovereignty and integrity of India, that I will faithfully and conscientiously discharge my duties as a Minister for the State of () and that I will do right to all manner of people in accordance with the Constitution and the law without fear or favour, affection or ill-will.

== See also ==
- Governor of Uttarakhand
- Uttarakhand Legislative Assembly
- Speaker of the Uttarakhand Legislative Assembly
- Leader of the Opposition in the Uttarakhand Legislative Assembly
- Chief Justice of Uttarakhand
- Union Council of Ministers
- List of agencies of the government of Uttarakhand
- List of departments of the government of Uttarakhand
