= Trivendra Singh Rawat =

8th Chief Minister of Uttarakhand, India

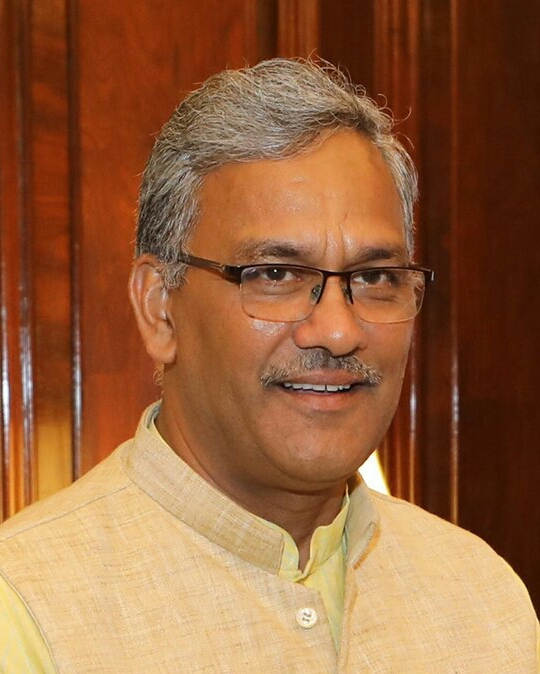

Member of Parliament, Lok Sabha
- Incumbent
- Assumed office 4 June 2024
- Preceded by: Ramesh Pokhriyal
- Constituency: Haridwar

8th Chief Minister of Uttarakhand
- In office 18 March 2017 – 10 March 2021
- Preceded by: Harish Rawat
- Succeeded by: Tirath Singh Rawat

Cabinet Minister Government of Uttarakhand
- In office 27 March 2007 – 13 March 2012
- Ministry: Agriculture & Animal Husbandry, Dairy Farming & Fisheries

Member of Uttarakhand Legislative Assembly
- In office 2017–2022
- Preceded by: Hira Singh Bisht
- Succeeded by: Brij Bhushan Gairola
- Constituency: Doiwala
- In office 2002–2012
- Preceded by: Constituency established
- Succeeded by: Ramesh Pokhriyal

Personal details
- Born: 20 December 1960 (age 65) Khairasain, Uttar Pradesh (now in Uttarakhand), India
- Party: Bharatiya Janata Party
- Education: Hemwati Nandan Bahuguna Garhwal University
- Occupation: Politician

Trivendra Singh Rawat (born 20 December 1960) is an Indian politician who served as the Chief Minister of Uttarakhand between 2017 and 2021. He is currently serving as the Member of Parliament from Haridwar Lok Sabha constituency since 2024 after winning as a Bharatiya Janata Party candidate.

Rawat was a member of the Rashtriya Swayamsevak Sangh from 1979 to 2002 and held the post of organising secretary of the Uttarakhand region, and later the Uttarakhand state, after the state's formation in 2000. He was elected from Doiwala in the State's first legislative assembly elections in 2002. He retained his seat in the 2007 elections and served as the State's Minister of Agriculture.

As a member of the Bharatiya Janata Party, Rawat served as Jharkhand's in-charge and Uttarakhand cadre's president. Winning from Doiwala again in 2017, he was named the Chief Minister after his party won majority and formed the government. Rawat resigned from the post on 9 March 2021 citing a "collective decision" made by the party.

== Early life and career ==
Rawat was born on 20 December 1960 in the village of Khairasain in the Kotdwar tehsil, in Pauri Garhwal district of Uttarakhand. He was the ninth and youngest child in the family. He obtained his master's degree in journalism from Birla Campus in Srinagar affiliated to the Hemwati Nandan Bahuguna Garhwal University.

Rawat joined the Rashtriya Swayamsevak Sangh in 1979 before becoming its pracharak (campaigner) for the Dehradun region in 1985. Subsequently, he joined the Bharatiya Janata Party (BJP), the political party associated with it. He was made BJP's organising secretary for the Uttarakhand region and worked with the senior leader Lalji Tandon at the time. He was also actively involved in the Uttarakhand movement, during which he was arrested several times. After the region received statehood in 2000, Rawat was made the state cadre's BJP president.

Rawat lost a by-election from Doiwala in 2014, when the seat was vacated by former Chief Minister Ramesh Pokhriyal.

=== Chief Minister ===
In 2017 he won the same Assembly constituency of Doiwala. His 27 July 2017 tweet about linguistic preferences sparked off controversy and he was accused of preferring Garhwali language over the Kumaoni language.

In July 2019, Rawat said that cow is the only animal that exhales oxygen and that living in close proximity to cows could cure tuberculosis. This unscientific statement sparked off a controversy.

On 9 March 2021, Rawat resigned from the post of the Chief Minister of Uttarakhand. This was following meetings with the BJP leaders in Delhi, whom the observers from centre gave their report about the growing dissent against Rawat among MLAs and ministers, including mismanagement during the Chamoli flash floods.

In May 2021, Rawat said that coronavirus is also a living organism which has a right to live, just like humans. The virus is changing its form constantly. The opposition criticised him and said that his statement is foolish and nonsense, and he has lost his mind and has no vision.

He did not the contest 2022 assembly election.

=== Member of Lok Sabha ===
In March 2024, Rawat was announced as the BJP candidate for the Haridwar constituency in the 2024 general elections, which he won by a margin of 164,056 votes.

Lok Sabha
Preceded by Ramesh Pokhriyal	Member of Parliament for Haridwar; 2024 –Present	Incumbent
Political offices
Preceded by Harish Rawat	Chief Minister of Uttarakhand; 18 March 2017 – 10 March 2021	Succeeded by Tirath Singh Rawat
