= Chief Minister of Uttarakhand =

Leader of the executive branch of Government of Uttarakhand

- Emblem of Uttarakhand

- Flag of India

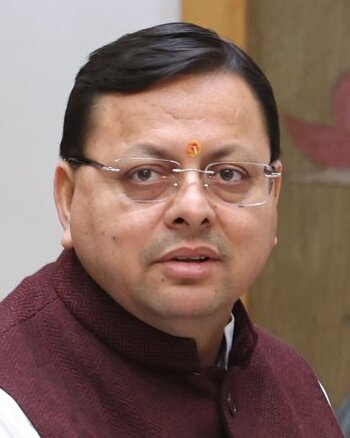
- Incumbent; Pushkar Singh Dhami since 4 July 2021
- Government of Uttarakhand
- Style: The Honourable (formal); Mr. Chief Minister (informal)
- Type: Leader of the Executive
- Status: Head of government
- Abbreviation: CMoUttarakhand
- Member of: State Cabinet; Legislative Assembly
- Reports to: Governor of Uttarakhand; Uttarakhand Legislative Assembly
- Residence: Chief Minister House, Bhararisain (summer); Chief Minister House, New Cantt Road, Dehradun (winter)
- Seat: Dehradun
- Nominator: MLAs of the majority party or alliance
- Appointer: Governor of Uttarakhand; by convention, based on appointee's ability to command confidence in the Assembly
- Term length: At the confidence of the assembly; Chief minister's term is for five years and is subject to no term limits.
- Inaugural holder: Nityanand Swami (2000–2001)
- Formation: 9 November 2000 (26 years ago)
- Salary: ₹175,000 (US$1,800)
- Website: https://cm.uk.gov.in

The chief minister of Uttarakhand is the Head of the government of the Indian state of Uttarakhand. In accordance with the Constitution of India, the governor is a state's de jure head, but de facto executive authority rests with the chief minister. Following elections to the legislative assembly, the state's governor usually invites the party (or coalition) with a majority of seats to form the government. The governor appoints the chief minister, whose council of ministers are collectively responsible to the assembly. Given the confidence of the assembly, the chief minister's term is for five years and is subject to no term limits.Chief Minister also serves as Leader of the House in the Legislative Assembly.

Ten people have served as the state's chief minister since its formation on 9 November 2000. Seven of them, including the inaugural officeholder Nityanand Swami and the incumbent Pushkar Singh Dhami represented the (BJP) while the rest represented the Indian National Congress.

== Oath as the state chief minister ==
The chief minister serves five years in the office. The following is the oath of the chief minister of state:

I, <Name of Chief Minister>, do swear in the name of God/solemnly affirm that I will bear true faith and allegiance to the Constitution of India as by law established, that I will uphold the sovereignty and integrity of India, that I will faithfully and conscientiously discharge my duties as a Minister for the State of () and that I will do right to all manner of people in accordance with the Constitution and the law without fear or favour, affection or ill-will.

Oath of Secrecy

"I, [Name], do swear in the name of God / solemnly affirm that I will not directly or indirectly communicate or reveal to any person or persons any matter which shall be brought under my consideration or shall become known to me as a Minister for the State of [Name of State] except as may be required for the due discharge of my duties as such Minister."Pad ki Shapath (Oath of Office) "Main, [CM ka Naam], Ishwar ki shapath leta hoon / satyanishtha se pratigyan karta hoon ki main vidhi dwara sthapit Bharat ke Samvidhan ke prati sachi shraddha aur nishtha rakhunga. Main Bharat ki prabhuta aur akhandta akshunn rakhunga. Main [State ka Naam] ke Rajya ke Mukhya Mantri ke roop mein apne kartavyon ka shraddhapoorvak aur shuddh antahkaran se nirvahan karunga, tatha main bhay ya pakshpat, anurag ya dwesh ke bina, sabhi prakar ke logon ke prati Samvidhan aur vidhi ke anusar nyay karunga." B. Gopniyata ki Shapath (Oath of Secrecy) "Main, [CM ka Naam], Ishwar ki shapath leta hoon / satyanishtha se pratigyan karta hoon ki jo vishay [State ka Naam] ke Rajya ke Mukhya Mantri ke roop mein mere vichar ke liye laya jayega athva mujhe gyaat hoga, use kisi vyakti ya vyaktityon ko, tab ke sivay jab ki aise Mukhya Mantri ke roop mein apne kartavyon ke uchit nirvahan ke liye aisa karna apekshit ho, main pratyaksh (directly) ya apratyaksh (indirectly) roop mein sansuchit ya prakat nahi karunga."

== Chief ministers of Uttarakhand (2000–present) ==
#	Portrait	Name	Constituency	Term of office			Assembly (election)	Party (Note: This column only names the chief minister's party. The state government he heads may be a complex coalition of several parties and independents; these are not listed here.)
1		Nityanand Swami	MLC (Graduates Quota)	9 November 2000	29 October 2001	354 days	Interim	Bharatiya Janata Party
2		Bhagat Singh Koshyari	MLC (MLAs Quota)	30 October 2001	1 March 2002	122 days	Interim	Bharatiya Janata Party
3		N. D. Tiwari	Ramnagar	2 March 2002	7 March 2007	5 years, 5 days	1st (2002)	Indian National Congress
4		B. C. Khanduri	Dhumakot	7 March 2007	27 June 2009	2 years, 111 days	2nd (2007)	Bharatiya Janata Party
5		Ramesh Pokhriyal	Thalisain	27 June 2009	11 September 2011	2 years, 75 days	2nd (2007)	Bharatiya Janata Party
(4)		B. C. Khanduri	Dhumakot	11 September 2011	13 March 2012	184 days	2nd (2007)	Bharatiya Janata Party
6		Vijay Bahuguna	Sitarganj	13 March 2012	31 January 2014	1 year, 324 days	3rd (2012)	Indian National Congress
7		Harish Rawat	Dharchula	1 February 2014	27 March 2016	2 years, 55 days	3rd (2012)	Indian National Congress
–		Vacant (President's rule)	N/A	27 March 2016	21 April 2016	25 days	3rd (2012)	N/A
(7)		Harish Rawat	Dharchula	21 April 2016	22 April 2016	1 day	3rd (2012)	Indian National Congress
–		Vacant (President's rule)	N/A	22 April 2016	11 May 2016	19 days	3rd (2012)	N/A
(7)		Harish Rawat	Dharchula	11 May 2016	18 March 2017	311 days	3rd (2012)	Indian National Congress
8		Trivendra Singh Rawat	Doiwala	18 March 2017	10 March 2021	3 years, 357 days	4th (2017)	Bharatiya Janata Party
9		Tirath Singh Rawat	N/A	10 March 2021	4 July 2021	116 days	4th (2017)	Bharatiya Janata Party
10		Pushkar Singh Dhami	Khatima	4 July 2021	23 March 2022	5 years, 135 days	4th (2017)	Bharatiya Janata Party
10		Pushkar Singh Dhami	Champawat	23 March 2022	Incumbent	5 years, 135 days	5th (2022)	Bharatiya Janata Party

== Statistics ==
=== List by chief minister ===
Fraction of time of holding CMO by party (as of July 2026)
1. Bharatiya Janata Party (60.9%)
2. Indian National Congress (38.6%)
3. President's Rule (0.47%)

#	Chief Minister	Party	Length of term	
#	Chief Minister	Party	Longest tenure	Total tenure
1	Pushkar Singh Dhami	BJP	5 years, 135 days	5 years, 135 days
2	N. D. Tiwari	INC	5 years, 5 days	5 years, 5 days
3	Trivendra Singh Rawat	BJP	3 years, 357 days	3 years, 357 days
4	Harish Rawat	INC	2 years, 55 days	3 years, 2 days
5	B. C. Khanduri	BJP	2 years, 111 days	2 years, 295 days
6	Ramesh Pokhriyal	BJP	2 years, 75 days	2 years, 75 days
7	Vijay Bahuguna	INC	1 year, 324 days	1 year, 324 days
8	Nityanand Swami	BJP	354 days	354 days
9	Bhagat Singh Koshyari	BJP	122 days	122 days
10	Tirath Singh Rawat	BJP	116 days	116 days

== See also ==
- Government of Uttarakhand
- Governor of Uttarakhand
- Uttarakhand Legislative Assembly
- Speaker of the Uttarakhand Legislative Assembly
- Leader of the Opposition in the Uttarakhand Legislative Assembly
- Cabinet of Uttarakhand
- Chief Justice of Uttarakhand
- List of current Indian chief ministers
- List of prime ministers of India
