= Ramesh Pokhriyal =

5th Chief Minister of Uttarakhand, India

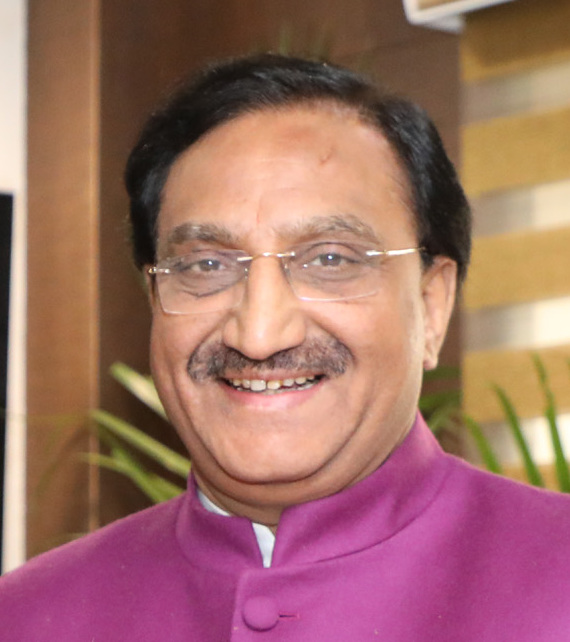

Union Minister of Education
- In office 29 July 2020 – 7 July 2021
- Prime Minister: Narendra Modi
- Preceded by: Himself as Minister of Human Resource Development
- Succeeded by: Dharmendra Pradhan

Minister of Human Resource Development
- In office 30 May 2019 – 29 July 2020
- Prime Minister: Narendra Modi
- Preceded by: Prakash Javadekar
- Succeeded by: Himself as Minister of Education

Member of Parliament, Lok Sabha
- In office 16 May 2014 – 4 June 2024
- Preceded by: Harish Rawat
- Succeeded by: Trivendra Singh Rawat
- Constituency: Haridwar

5th Chief Minister of Uttarakhand
- In office 27 June 2009 – 11 September 2011
- Preceded by: B. C. Khanduri
- Succeeded by: B. C. Khanduri

Personal details
- Born: 15 July 1959 (age 67) Pinani, Uttarakhand, India
- Party: Bharatiya Janata Party
- Spouse: Kusum Kanta Pokhriyal (m. 1985; died 2012)
- Children: 3
- Education: Hemwati Nandan Bahuguna Garhwal University

Ramesh Pokhriyal "Nishank" (born 15 July 1959) is an Indian politician from Bharatiya Janata Party. He served as the Human Resource Development Minister in the Union Government of India starting from 31 May 2019. The name of his ministry was changed to Education Ministry in July 2020, following the ministry's name change, his title was changed to Minister of Education.

He represented the Haridwar Parliamentary constituency of Uttarakhand in the 17th Lok Sabha. He was the 5th Chief Minister of Uttarakhand from 2009 to 2011. Due to corruption allegations he was asked to resign from his post by the BJP Central Leadership.

== Personal life ==
Pokhriyal was born in Pinani village, Pauri Garhwal, Uttarakhand to Paramanand Pokhriyal and Vishambhari Devi. He received an M.A. degree from Hemwati Nandan Bahuguna Garhwal University.

Pokhriyal married Kusum Kanta Pokhriyal on 7 May 1985, with whom he has three daughters. One of their daughters, Aarushi Nishank is a classical dancer, actress, producer and model. His wife died on 11 November 2012 in Dehradun at the age of 50.

== Political career ==
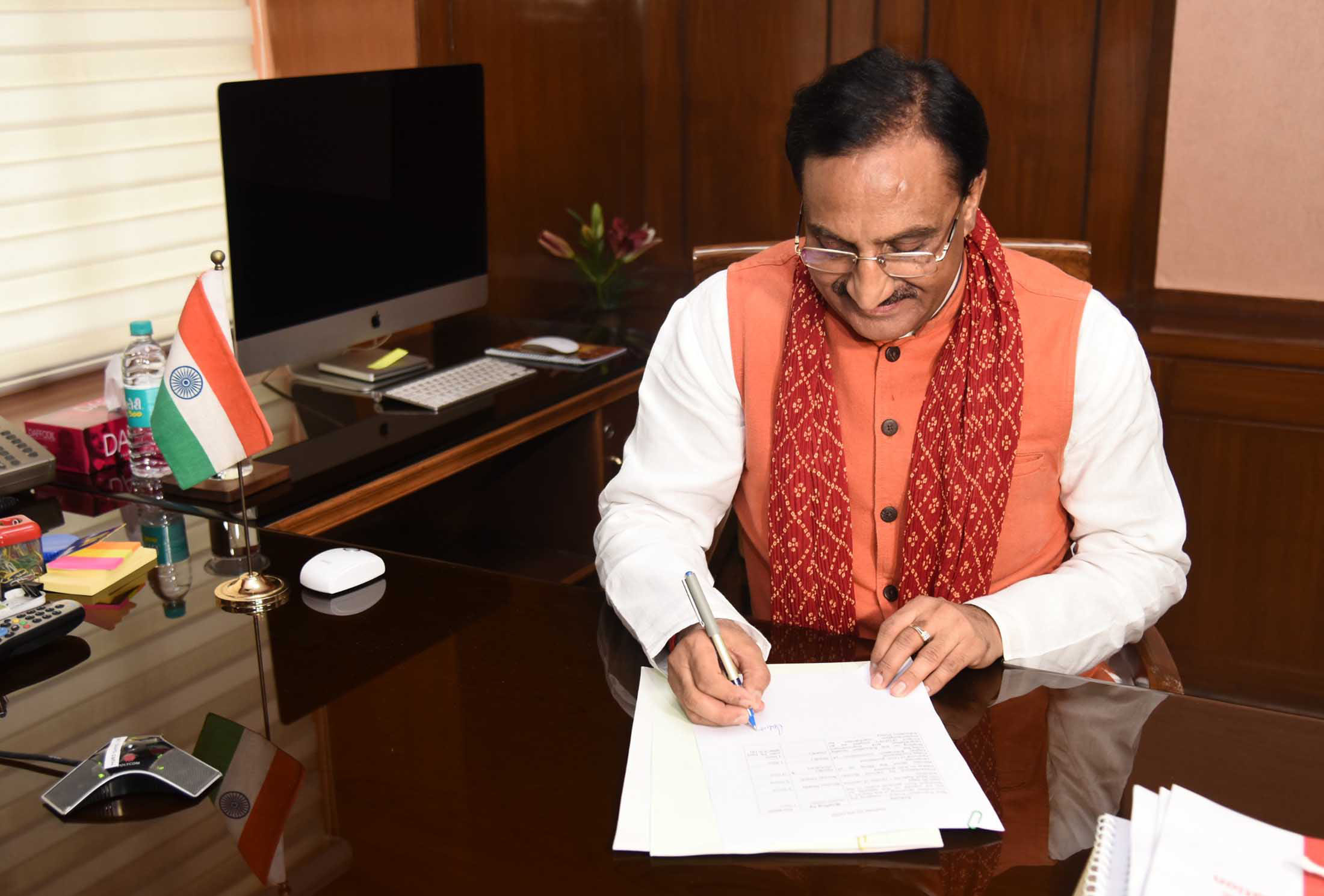
Pokhriyal taking charge as the Union Minister for Human Resource Development (now Education), in New Delhi on 31 May 2019.

Pokhriyal started his career as a teacher in Rashtriya Swayamsevak Sangh-affiliated Saraswati Shishu Mandir. He was first elected to public office in the erstwhile undivided Uttar Pradesh as a member of the Uttar Pradesh Legislative Assembly from Karnaprayag constituency in 1991, defeating a five-time Congress MLA. He was re-elected in 1993 and 1996 from the same constituency. In 1997 he was appointed to the position of Uttaranchal development minister. He contested 2002 election from Thalisain and lost, but in 2007 election won the seat. He was also Uttarakhand's chief minister (from 2009 to 2011). In 2012 election he changed his seat to Doiwala and Won. In 2014 and 2019 election he won and represented as Haridwar MP and the chairman of the Assurance Committee. He was the member of the Legislative Assembly of Uttar Pradesh for three consecutive terms from 1991 to 2002 and member of the Legislative Assembly of Uttarakhand from 2007 to 2014 for two consecutive terms. On 30 May 2019, he was sworn in as Minister of Human Resource Development in the 2nd Modi Government. Following the ministry's name change to the Ministry of Education (India) in July 2020, he served under the title of Minister of Education.

== Literary career ==
Pokhriyal has written novels, stories and poems. He has authored more than 100 books in Hindi, some of which have been translated to English as well as other Indian languages. Most of his books were published by two private publishers – Vani Prakashan and Diamond Books, and many were published between 2009 and 2011, when he was chief minister of Uttarakhand.

One of his works was adapted into the Garhwali film Major Nirala, which was produced by his daughter Aarushi Nishank and released in 2018.

He is honoured by Hindi Writers Guild, Canada in 2021 and was conferred with the "Sahitya Gaurav Samman".

Lok Sabha
Preceded by Harish Rawat	Member of Parliament for Haridwar; 2014 – 2024	Succeeded by Trivendra Singh Rawat
Political offices
Preceded by B. C. Khanduri	Chief Minister of Uttarakhand; 27 June 2009 – 10 September 2011	Succeeded by B. C. Khanduri
Preceded by Prakash Javadekar	Minister of Education; 31 May 2019 – 7 July 2021	Succeeded by Dharmendra Pradhan
