= Matbar Singh Kandari =

Indian politician

Matbar Singh Kandari is a political leader of Uttarakhand. He was cabinet minister in the government of Uttrakhand, India.

Matbar Singh Kandari was made minister in the Kalyan Singh government and Mayawati government when Uttar Pradesh was undivided. He became leader of opposition during first Uttarakhand assembly from 2005 until 2007. He is one of the senior leaders of Uttarakhand. He became MLA from Rudraprayag and Karnaprayag assembly seats of Uttarakhand.
