= 1993 Uttar Pradesh Legislative Assembly election =

1993 Uttar Pradesh legislative assembly election
- 18 November 1993

All 425 seats of Uttar Pradesh Legislative Assembly 213 seats needed for a majority
- Turnout: 57.13%
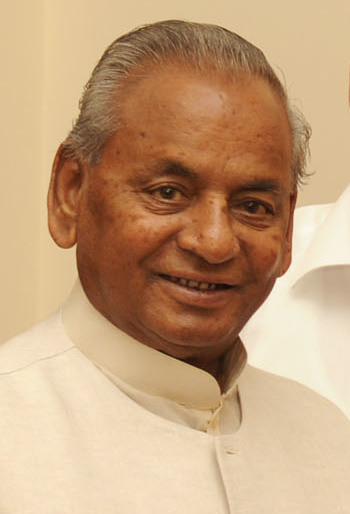

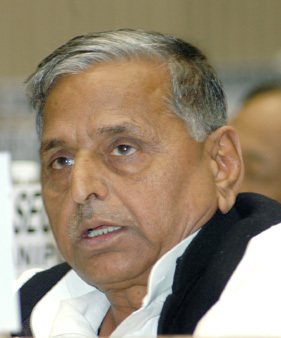

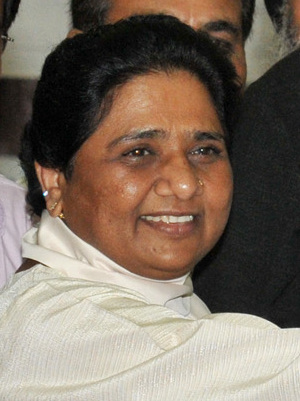
	Majority party	Minority party	Third party
Leader	Kalyan Singh	Mulayam Singh Yadav	Mayawati
Party	BJP	SP	BSP
Alliance	BJP	SP+BSP	BSP+SP
Leader's seat	Atrauli; Kasganj	Shikohabad; Jaswantnagar; Nidhaulikalan Assembly constituency	Did not contest
Last election	221	New	12
Seats won	177	109	67
Seat change	▼44	New	▲55
Popular vote	16,637,720	8,963,697	5,554,076
Percentage	33.30%	17.94%	11.12%
Swing	▼0.78%	New	▲1.68%
Chief Minister before election
President's Rule
Elected Chief Minister
Mulayam Singh Yadav
SP

Legislative Assembly elections were held in Uttar Pradesh on the 18 November 1993. President's rule was imposed in UP in December 1992. Elections were conducted in November 1993. The Bharatiya Janata Party remained the largest party, winning 174 of the 425 seats. Mulayam Singh Yadav of Samajwadi Party, who had contested the election with Bahujan Samaj Party, was sworn in as Chief Minister on 4 December 1993. The government was supported by Congress and Janata Dal. In October 1995, the coalition between SP and BSP was dissolved, and again President's Rule was imposed.

== Parties and alliances ==
=== Bharatiya Janata Party ===
Party	Flag	Symbol	Leader	Seats contested
Bharatiya Janata Party			Kalyan Singh	422

=== Indian National Congress ===
Party	Flag	Symbol	Leader	Seats contested
Indian National Congress			Narayan Dutt Tiwari	421

=== SP+BSP ===
Party	Flag	Symbol	Leader	Seats contested
Samajwadi Party			Mulayam Singh Yadav	256
Bahujan Samaj Party			Mayawati	164

== Results ==
Party	Seats				Popular vote		
Party	Contested	Won	FD	+/−	Votes	%	±pp
Bharatiya Janata Party	422	177	20	▼44	16,637,720	33.3	▲1.85
Samajwadi Party	256	109	52	New entry	8,963,697	17.94	New entry
Bahujan Samaj Party	164	67	40	▲55	5,554,076	11.12	▲1.68
Indian National Congress	421	28	264	▼18	7,533,272	15.08	▼2.24
Janata Dal	377	27	244	▼65	6,162,231	12.33	▼6.51
Communist Party of India	37	3	33	▼1	321,617	0.61	▼0.43
Communist Party of India (Marxist)	17	1	11	Steady	236,402	0.47	▲0.15
Janata Party	298	1	296	▼33	262,048	0.52	▼12.0
Uttarakhand Kranti Dal	13	1	12	▲1	75,177	0.15	
Independents	6557	8	6530	▲1	3,400,751	6.81	▼0.63
Valid votes			49,968,394	97.72			
Invalid votes			1,164,573	2.28			
Votes cast/ turnout			51,146,036	57.13			
Abstentions			38,384,705	42.87			
Registered voters			89,530,741	100			

== Elected members ==
Constituency	Reserved for (SC/ST/None)	Member	Party
Uttarkashi (SC)	SC	Barfiya Lal Juwantha	Samajwadi Party
Tehri	None	Shoorveer Singh Sajwan	Indian National Congress
Deoprayag	None	Matbar Singh Kandari	Bharatiya Janata Party
Lansdowne	None	Surendra Singh Negi	Independent
Pauri	None	Harak Singh Rawat	Bharatiya Janata Party
Karanprayag	None	Ramesh Pokhariyal Nishank	Bharatiya Janata Party
Badri-Kedar	None	Kedar Singh Phonia	Bharatiya Janata Party
Didihat	None	Kashi Singh Airy	Uttarakhand Kranti Dal
Pithoragarh	None	Mahendra Singh Mahra (Manoo Bhai)	Indian National Congress
Almora	None	Govind Singh Kunjwal	Indian National Congress
Bageshwar (SC)	SC	Ram Prasad	Indian National Congress
Ranikhet	None	Bachi Singh Rawat	Bharatiya Janata Party
Nainital	None	Banshidhar Bhagat	Bharatiya Janata Party
Khatima (SC)	SC	Yashpal Arya	Indian National Congress
Haldwani	None	Tilak Raj Behar	Bharatiya Janata Party
Kashipur	None	Rajiv Kumar	Bharatiya Janata Party
Seohara	None	Mahaveer Singh	Bharatiya Janata Party
Dhampur	None	Rajender Singh	Bharatiya Janata Party
Afzalgarh	None	Inder Dev Singh	Bharatiya Janata Party
Nagina (SC)	SC	Satish Kumar	Janata Dal
Nazibabad (SC)	SC	Ramswroop Singh	Communist Party of India
Bijnor	None	Mahendra Pal Singh	Bharatiya Janata Party
Chandpur	None	Tej Pal Singh	Independent
Kanth	None	Mahboob Ali	Janata Party
Amroha	None	Hazi Muhammad Hayat	Janata Dal
Hasanpur	None	Tula Ram Saini	Bharatiya Janata Party
Gangeshwari	SC	Preetam Singh	Bharatiya Janata Party
Sambhal	None	Satya Prakash	Bharatiya Janata Party
Bahjoi	None	Satyender Singh	Bharatiya Janata Party
Chandausi	SC	Karan Singh	Samajwadi Party
Kundarki	None	Chandra Vijay Singh alias Baby Raja	Bharatiya Janata Party
Moradabad West	None	Samarpal Singh	Janata Dal
Moradabad	None	Sandeep Aggarwal	Bharatiya Janata Party
Moradabad Rural	None	Suresh Pratap Singh	Bharatiya Janata Party
Thakurdwara	None	Sarvesh Kumar Alias Rakesh	Bharatiya Janata Party
Suartanda	None	Shiv Bahadur Saxena	Bharatiya Janata Party
Rampur	None	Azam Khan	Samajwadi Party
Bilaspur	None	Harendra Singh	Samajwadi Party
Shahabad	SC	Swami Parma Nand Dandi	Bharatiya Janata Party
Bisauli	None	Daya Sindhu Shankhdar	Bharatiya Janata Party
Gunnaur	None	Rajesh Kumar	Samajwadi Party
Sahaswan	None	Mir Mazhar Ali Urf Nanhe Mian	Samajwadi Party
Bilsi	SC	Yogender Kumar Sagar	Bharatiya Janata Party
Budaun	None	Jugender Singh Yadav	Samajwadi Party
Usehat	None	Banwari Singh	Samajwadi Party
Binawar	None	Ram Sewak Singh	Bharatiya Janata Party
Dataganj	None	Avinash Kumar Singh	Bharatiya Janata Party
Aonla	None	Mahi Pal Singh Yadav	Samajwadi Party
Sunha	None	Kunwar Serva Raj Ringh	Samajwadi Party
Faridpur	SC	Siya Ram Sagar	Samajwadi Party
Bareilly Cantonment	None	Praveen Singh Aron	Samajwadi Party
Bareilly City	None	Rajesh Agarwal	Bharatiya Janata Party
Nawabganj	None	Bhagwat Saran Gangwar	Bharatiya Janata Party
Bhojipura	None	Harish Kumar Gangwar	Samajwadi Party
Kawar	None	Sharafat Yar Khan	Samajwadi Party
Baheri	None	Manzoor Ahmad	Samajwadi Party
Pilibhit	None	B. K. Gupta	Bharatiya Janata Party
Barkhera	SC	Kishan Lal	Bharatiya Janata Party
Bisalpur	None	Ram Saran Varma	Bharatiya Janata Party
Puranpur	None	Virendra Mohan Singh	Janata Dal
Powayan	SC	Chet Ram	Indian National Congress
Nigohi	None	Puttu Singh Yadav	Samajwadi Party
Tilhar	None	Virendra Pratap Singh Alias Munna	Indian National Congress
Jalalabad	None	Ram Murti Singh	Samajwadi Party
Dadraul	None	Ram Autar	Indian National Congress
Shahjahanpur	None	Suresh Kumar Khanna	Bharatiya Janata Party
Mohamdi	SC	Jagan Nath Prasad	Bharatiya Janata Party
Haiderabad	None	Ram Kumar Verma	Bharatiya Janata Party
Paila	SC	Shashi Bala Bharti	Bharatiya Janata Party
Lakhimpur	None	Ram Gopal	Bharatiya Janata Party
Srinagar	None	Kr. Dhirendra Bahadur Singh	Samajwadi Party
Nighasan	None	Nirvendra Kumar Munna	Samajwadi Party
Dhaurehara	None	Yeshpal Chaudary	Samajwadi Party
Behta	None	Mukhtar Anis	Janata Dal
Biswan	None	Sunder Pal Singh	Samajwadi Party
Mahmoodabad	None	Narender Singh	Bharatiya Janata Party
Sidhauli	SC	Shyam Lal Rawat	Samajwadi Party
Laharpur	None	Anil Kumar	Samajwadi Party
Sitapur	None	Rajendra Kumar Gupta	Bharatiya Janata Party
Hargaon	SC	Daulat Ram	Bharatiya Janata Party
Misrikh	None	Om Prakash Gupta	Samajwadi Party
Machhrehta	SC	Balgovind Rajvanshi	Bahujan Samaj Party
Beniganj	SC	Sushila Saroj	Samajwadi Party
Sandila	None	Kunwar Mahavir Singh	Bharatiya Janata Party
Ahirori	SC	Jadu Rani	Samajwadi Party
Hardoi	None	Naresh Agrawal	Indian National Congress
Bawan	SC	Chhotey Lal S/o Narain	Bahujan Samaj Party
Pihani	None	Ashok Bajpai	Samajwadi Party
Shahabad	None	Baboo Khan	Samajwadi Party
Bilgram	None	Vishram Singh	Samajwadi Party
Mallawan	None	Ram Asray Verma	Janata Dal
Bangarmau	None	Ashok Kumar Singh Bebi	Samajwadi Party
Safipur	SC	Babu Lal	Bharatiya Janata Party
Unnao	None	Manohar Lal	Samajwadi Party
Hadha	None	Sunder Lal Lodhi	Bharatiya Janata Party
Bhagwant Nagar	None	Devaki Nandan	Bharatiya Janata Party
Purwa	None	Hriday Narayan	Samajwadi Party
Hasanganj	SC	Ram Khelawan	Bahujan Samaj Party
Malihabad	SC	Gauri Shankar	Samajwadi Party
Mohana	None	Rajendra Prasad	Samajwadi Party
Lucknow East	None	Bhagwati Prasad Shukla	Bharatiya Janata Party
Lucknow West	None	Ram Kumar Shukla	Bharatiya Janata Party
Lucknow Central	None	Ram Prakash	Bharatiya Janata Party
Lucknow Cantonment	None	Satish Bhatia	Bharatiya Janata Party
Sarojini Nagar	None	Shyam Kishore Yadav	Samajwadi Party
Mohanlalganj	SC	Sant Bux Rawat	Samajwadi Party
Bachhrawan	SC	Raja Ram Tyagi	Bharatiya Janata Party
Tiloi	None	Mayankeshwar Sharan Singh	Bharatiya Janata Party
Rae Bareli	None	Akhilesh Kumar Singh	Indian National Congress
Sataon	None	Ram Naresh Yadav	Samajwadi Party
Sareni	None	Girish Narain Pande	Bharatiya Janata Party
Dalmau	None	Gajadhar Singh	Samajwadi Party
Salon	SC	Dal Bahadur Kori	Bharatiya Janata Party
Kunda	None	Kunwar Raghuraj Pratap Singh Urf Raja Bhaiya	Independent
Bihar	SC	Suresh Pasi	Samajwadi Party
Rampurkhas	None	Pramod Tiwari	Indian National Congress
Garwara	None	Ramesh Bahadur Singh	Bharatiya Janata Party
Pratapgarh	None	Lal Bahadur Singh	Samajwadi Party
Birapur	None	Laxmi Narayan Pandey (guruji)	Bharatiya Janata Party
Patti	None	Ram Lakhan	Samajwadi Party
Amethi	None	Jamuna Mishra	Bharatiya Janata Party
Gauriganj	None	Tej Bhan Singh	Bharatiya Janata Party
Jagdishpur	SC	Nand Lal	Samajwadi Party
Isauli	None	Indra Bhadra Singh	Independent
Sultanpur	None	Barkat Ali Khan	Samajwadi Party
Jaisinghpur	None	A. Raish	Samajwadi Party
Chanda	None	Safdar Raja Khan	Bahujan Samaj Party
Kadipur	SC	Bhagelu Ram	Bahujan Samaj Party
Katehari	None	Ram Dev Verma	Bahujan Samaj Party
Akbarpur	None	Ram Achal Rajbhar	Bahujan Samaj Party
Jalalpur	None	Ram Lakhan Verma	Bahujan Samaj Party
Jahangirganj	SC	Dhamu Ram Bhaskar	Bahujan Samaj Party
Tanda	None	Masswood Ahamad	Bahujan Samaj Party
Ayodhya	None	Lallu Singh	Bharatiya Janata Party
Bikapur	None	Parashu Ram S/o Algu	Samajwadi Party
Milkipur	None	Mitrasen Yadav	Communist Party of India
Sohawal	SC	Avdhesh Prasad	Samajwadi Party
Rudauli	None	Ishtiyak Ahmad	Samajwadi Party
Dariyabad	SC	Radhey Shyam	Samajwadi Party
Siddhaur	None	Baij Nath Rawat	Bharatiya Janata Party
Haidergarh	None	Sunder Lal Dixit	Bharatiya Janata Party
Masauli	None	Beni Prasad	Samajwadi Party
Nawabganj	None	Chhote Lal Yadav	Samajwadi Party
Fatehpur	SC	Hardev Singh	Samajwadi Party
Ramnagar	None	Raj Laxmi Verma	Bharatiya Janata Party
Kaiserganj	None	Ramtej	Samajwadi Party
Fakharpur	None	Mayankar Singh	Bharatiya Janata Party
Mahsi	None	Dilip Kumar Verma	Samajwadi Party
Nanpara	None	Fajur Rahman Ansari	Bahujan Samaj Party
Charda	SC	Shabbir Ahmad	Samajwadi Party
Bhinga	None	Chandra Mani Kant	Bharatiya Janata Party
Bahraich	None	Waqar Ahmad Shah	Samajwadi Party
Ikauna	SC	Achhaiber Lal	Bharatiya Janata Party
Gainsari	None	Shiv Pratap Yadav	Samajwadi Party
Tulsipur	None	Rizwan Zaheer Alias Rajju Bhaiya	Samajwadi Party
Balrampur	None	Vinay Kumar Pandey Vinno	Samajwadi Party
Utraula	None	Vishavnath Prasad Gupta	Bharatiya Janata Party
Sadullah Nagar	None	Ram Pratap Singh	Bharatiya Janata Party
Mankapur	SC	Ram Bishnu Azad	Indian National Congress
Mujehna	None	Ghan Shyam Shukla	Bharatiya Janata Party
Gonda	None	Tulsi Das Rai Chandani	Bharatiya Janata Party
Katra Bazar	None	Sri Ram Singh	Bharatiya Janata Party
Colonelganj	None	Ajai Pratap Singh Alias Lalla Bhaiya	Bharatiya Janata Party
Dixir	SC	Rama Pati Shastri	Bharatiya Janata Party
Harraiya	None	Jagdamba	Bharatiya Janata Party
Captainganj	None	Ram Prasad Choudhary	Samajwadi Party
Nagar East	SC	Ram Karan Arya	Samajwadi Party
Basti	None	Jagdambika Pal	Indian National Congress
Ramnagar	None	Baboo Ram Verma	Samajwadi Party
Domariaganj	None	Prem Prakash Alias Jippy Tewari	Bharatiya Janata Party
Itwa	None	Swayamver Choudhary	Bharatiya Janata Party
Shohratgarh	None	Ravindra Pratap Alias Pappu Chaudhary	Bharatiya Janata Party
Naugarh	None	Dhanraj Yadav	Bharatiya Janata Party
Bansi	None	Jai Pratap Singh	Bharatiya Janata Party
Khesraha	None	Amar Singh	Bharatiya Janata Party
Menhdawal	None	Chandra Shekhar	Bharatiya Janata Party
Khalilabad	SC	Ram Prakash	Bharatiya Janata Party
Hainsarbazar	SC	Lal Mani Prasad	Bahujan Samaj Party
Bansgaon	SC	Molai	Bahujan Samaj Party
Dhuriapar	None	Mohsin	Bahujan Samaj Party
Chillupar	None	Hari Shankar Tiwari	Indian National Congress
Kauriram	None	Ambika Singh	Independent
Mundera Bazar	SC	Bachan Ram	Bharatiya Janata Party
Pipraich	None	Jitendra Kumar Jiswal Urf Pappu Bhaiya	Independent
Gorakhpur	None	Shiv Pratap Shukla	Bharatiya Janata Party
Maniram	None	Om Prakash	Independent
Sahjanwa	None	Prabha Rawat	Samajwadi Party
Paniara	None	Ganpat Singh	Bharatiya Janata Party
Pharenda	None	Shivendra	Bharatiya Janata Party
Lakshmipur	None	Akhilesh S/o Ghanshyam	Samajwadi Party
Siswa	None	Sharda Prasad	Bharatiya Janata Party
Maharajganj	SC	Chandra Kishor	Bharatiya Janata Party
Shyamdeurawa	None	Ramadhar Yadav	Janata Dal
Naurangia	SC	Purnmasi Dehati	Samajwadi Party
Ramkola	None	Ambika Singh	Bharatiya Janata Party
Hata	SC	Rama Pati Urf Rama Kant	Bharatiya Janata Party
Padrauna	None	Baleshwar Yadav	Samajwadi Party
Seorahi	None	Nand Kishor Misra	Bharatiya Janata Party
Fazilnagar	None	Vishna Nath	Janata Dal
Kasia	None	Brahma Shankar Tripathi	Janata Dal
Gauri Bazar	None	Shakir	Bahujan Samaj Party
Rudrapur	None	Mukti Nath	Samajwadi Party
Deoria	None	Ravindra Pratap Mall	Bharatiya Janata Party
Bhatpar Rani	None	Kameshwar Upadhyay	Indian National Congress
Salempur	None	Anand Yadav	Bahujan Samaj Party
Barhaj	None	Sawami Nath	Samajwadi Party
Nathupur	None	Rajendra Kumar	Bahujan Samaj Party
Ghosi	None	Achaibar Bharti	Bahujan Samaj Party
Sagri	None	Barkhu Ram Verma	Bahujan Samaj Party
Gopalpur	None	Irshad	Bahujan Samaj Party
Azamgarh	None	Raj Bali Yadav	Bahujan Samaj Party
Nizamabad	None	Angad Yadava	Bahujan Samaj Party
Atraulia	None	Balaram Yadav	Samajwadi Party
Phulpur	None	Ramakant Yadav	Samajwadi Party
Saraimir	SC	Samaee	Bahujan Samaj Party
Mehnagar	SC	Daroga Saroj	Samajwadi Party
Lalganj	None	Sukh Deo	Bahujan Samaj Party
Mubarakpur	None	Ram Darshan	Samajwadi Party
Muhammadabad Gohna	SC	Faujdar	Bahujan Samaj Party
Mau	None	Naseem	Bahujan Samaj Party
Rasra	SC	Ghura Ram	Bahujan Samaj Party
Siar	None	Shardanand Anchal	Samajwadi Party
Chilkahar	None	Sangram Singh Yadav	Bahujan Samaj Party
Sikanderpur	None	Deena Nath Chaudhary	Samajwadi Party
Bansdih	None	Bachcha Pathak	Indian National Congress
Doaba	None	Bikram Singh	Indian National Congress
Ballia	None	Markandey Singh	Bharatiya Janata Party
Kopachit	None	Ambika Chaudhary	Samajwadi Party
Zahoorabad	None	Isteyak Ansari	Bahujan Samaj Party
Mohammadabad	None	Afzal Ansari	Communist Party of India
Dildarnagar	None	Om Prakash	Samajwadi Party
Zamania	None	Jai Ram Kushwaha	Bahujan Samaj Party
Jakhania	SC	Chandra Shekhar	Bahujan Samaj Party
Sadat	SC	Ram Dhani	Samajwadi Party
Saidpur	None	Sri Lal Ji	Bahujan Samaj Party
Dhanapur	None	Ramjeet Bhardawaj	Bahujan Samaj Party
Chandauli	SC	Dina Nath Bhaskar	Bahujan Samaj Party
Chakiya	SC	Rajesh Kumar	Bharatiya Janata Party
Mughalsarai	None	Chhabboo	Bharatiya Janata Party
Varanasi Cantonment	None	Jyotsana	Bharatiya Janata Party
Varanasi South	None	Shyam Dev Rai Chaudhari (dada)	Bharatiya Janata Party
Varanasi North	None	Amarnath Yadav	Bharatiya Janata Party
Chiraigaon	None	Maya Shankar Pathak	Bharatiya Janata Party
Kolasla	None	Udal	Communist Party of India
Gangapur	None	Bachnu Ram Patel	Bharatiya Janata Party
Aurai	None	Rang Nath	Bharatiya Janata Party
Gyanpur	None	Ram Kishor Bind	Bahujan Samaj Party
Bhadohi	SC	Mewa Lal Bagi	Bahujan Samaj Party
Barsathi	None	Paras Nath Yadav	Samajwadi Party
Mariahu	None	Savitri Devi	Samajwadi Party
Kerakat	SC	Jagarnath Chaudhari	Bahujan Samaj Party
Bayalsi	None	Shriram Yadav	Bahujan Samaj Party
Jaunpur	None	Mohammad Arshad Khan	Bahujan Samaj Party
Rari	None	Lalji Yadav Aliias Jogi	Bahujan Samaj Party
Shahganj	SC	Ram Dawar	Bahujan Samaj Party
Khutahan	None	Uma Kant Yadav	Bahujan Samaj Party
Garwara	None	Umashankar	Bahujan Samaj Party
Machhlishahr	None	Jawala Prasad Yadava	Janata Dal
Dudhi	SC	Vijai Singh	Janata Dal
Robertsganj	SC	Tirath Raj	Bharatiya Janata Party
Rajgarh	None	Ram Lotan	Bahujan Samaj Party
Chunar	None	Om Prakash Singh	Bharatiya Janata Party
Majhwa	None	Bhagwat Pal	Bahujan Samaj Party
Mirzapur	None	Sarjeet Singh Dang	Bharatiya Janata Party
Chhanbey	SC	Sri Ram	Bahujan Samaj Party
Meja	SC	Raj Bali Jaisal	Bahujan Samaj Party
Karchana	None	Nand Lal Singh Patel	Bahujan Samaj Party
Bara	None	Ram Sevak Singh Patel	Bahujan Samaj Party
Jhusi	None	Jawahar Yadav (Pandit)	Samajwadi Party
Handia	None	Jokhu Lal Yadav	Bahujan Samaj Party
Pratappur	None	Jawahar Lal Diwakar	Bahujan Samaj Party
Soraon	None	Hira Mani Patel	Bahujan Samaj Party
Nawabganj	None	Nazamuddin	Bahujan Samaj Party
Allahabad North	None	Narendra Kumar Singh Gaur	Bharatiya Janata Party
Allahabad South	None	Keshri Nath Tripathi	Bharatiya Janata Party
Allahabad West	None	Atique Ahmed	Independent
Chail	SC	Shiv Dani	Bharatiya Janata Party
Sirathu	SC	Ram Sajiwan Nirmal	Bahujan Samaj Party
Khaga	None	Vir Abhimanyu Singh	Samajwadi Party
Kishunpur	SC	Murlidhar	Bahujan Samaj Party
Haswa	None	Mahender Pratap Narain Singh	Bharatiya Janata Party
Fatehpur	None	Radhey Shyam Gupta	Bharatiya Janata Party
Jahanabad	None	Madan Gopal Verma	Janata Dal
Bindki	None	Amarjit Singh Jansewah	Bharatiya Janata Party
Aryanagar	None	Mahesh Chandra	Bahujan Samaj Party
Sisamau	SC	Rakesh Sonkar	Bharatiya Janata Party
Generalganj	None	Neeraj Chaturvedi	Bharatiya Janata Party
Kanpur Cantonment	None	Satish Mahana	Bharatiya Janata Party
Govind Nagar	None	Bal Chandra Misra	Bharatiya Janata Party
Kalyanpur	None	Prem Lata Katiyar	Bharatiya Janata Party
Sarsaul	None	Jagram Singh	Samajwadi Party
Ghatampur	None	Rakesh Sachan	Janata Dal
Bhognipur	SC	Bhagwati Prasad Sagar	Bahujan Samaj Party
Rajpur	None	Choudhary Narendra Singh	Indian National Congress
Sarvankhera	None	Jaswant Singh	Samajwadi Party
Chaubepur	None	Hari Kishan	Bharatiya Janata Party
Bilhaur	SC	Shiv Kumar Beriya	Samajwadi Party
Derapur	None	Ram Dass Pal	Samajwadi Party
Auraiya	None	Inder Pal Singh	Samajwadi Party
Ajitmal	SC	Rekha Chhagla	Bahujan Samaj Party
Lakhna	SC	Sukh Devi	Samajwadi Party
Etawah	None	Jaybir Singh Bhadouriya	Samajwadi Party
Jaswantnagar	None	Mulayam Singh Yadav	Samajwadi Party
Bharthana	None	Maharaj Singh Yadav Itaily	Samajwadi Party
Bidhuna	None	Dani Ram Verma	Samajwadi Party
Kannauj	SC	Banwari Lal Dohray	Bharatiya Janata Party
Umardha	None	Kn. Arvindra Pratap Singh	Samajwadi Party
Chhibramau	None	Ram Prakash Tripathi	Bharatiya Janata Party
Kamalganj	None	Urmila Rajput	Bharatiya Janata Party
Farrukhabad	None	Brahma Dutt Dwivedi	Bharatiya Janata Party
Kaimganj	None	Pratap Singh Yadav	Samajwadi Party
Mohammdabad	None	Chandra Bhoshan Singh Alias Munnu Babu	Bharatiya Janata Party
Manikpur	SC	Mannu Lal Kureel	Bharatiya Janata Party
Karwi	None	Bhairon Prasad Mishra	Bharatiya Janata Party
Baberu	None	Gaya Charan Dinkar	Bahujan Samaj Party
Tindwari	None	Vishambhar Prasad	Bahujan Samaj Party
Banda	None	Raj Kumar Shivhare	Bharatiya Janata Party
Naraini	None	Surendra Pal Verma	Samajwadi Party
Hamirpur	None	Ashok Kumar Singh Chandel	Janata Dal
Maudaha	None	Bashir	Bahujan Samaj Party
Rath	None	Dhoo Ram	Bahujan Samaj Party
Charkhari (SC)	SC	Udai Prakash	Bahujan Samaj Party
Mahoba	None	Arimardan Singh	Janata Dal
Mehroni	None	Devendra Kumar Singh	Bharatiya Janata Party
Lalitpur	None	Arvind Kumar S/o Hajari Lal	Bharatiya Janata Party
Jhansi	None	Ravinder Shukla	Bharatiya Janata Party
Babina (SC)	SC	Ratan Lal Ahirwar	Bharatiya Janata Party
Mauranipur (SC)	SC	Bihari Lal Arya	Indian National Congress
Garoutha	None	Ranjit Singh Judev	Indian National Congress
Konch (SC)	SC	Chain Sukh Bharti	Bahujan Samaj Party
Orai	None	Akbar Ali	Bahujan Samaj Party
Kalpi	None	Shri Ram	Bahujan Samaj Party
Madhogarh	None	Shiv Ram Kushwaha	Bahujan Samaj Party
Bhongaon	None	Upadesh Singh Chauhan	Samajwadi Party
Kishni (SC)	SC	Rameshwar Dayal	Samajwadi Party
Karhal	None	Baboo Ram Yadav S/o Shri Jorawar Singh	Samajwadi Party
Shikohabad	None	Mulayam Singh Yadav	Samajwadi Party
Jasrana	None	Ramvir Singh Yadav	Samajwadi Party
Ghiror	None	Urmila Devi Yadav	Samajwadi Party
Mainpuri	None	Narendra Singh Yadav	Bharatiya Janata Party
Aliganj	None	Awadhpal Singh Yadav	Samajwadi Party
Patiyali	None	Sajjan Pal Singh Urf Rajjan Pal Singh	Bharatiya Janata Party
Sakit	None	Suraj Singh Shakya	Bharatiya Janata Party
Soron	None	Onkar Singh	Bharatiya Janata Party
Kasganj	None	Kalyan Singh	Bharatiya Janata Party
Etah	None	Pitam Singh	Bharatiya Janata Party
Nidhauli Kalan	None	Mulayam Singh Yadav	Samajwadi Party
Jalesar (SC)	SC	Raghuveer Singh	Samajwadi Party
Firozabad	None	Nasiruddin	Samajwadi Party
Bah	None	Mahendra Aridaman Singh	Janata Dal
Fatehabad	None	Chhotey Lal Verma	Bharatiya Janata Party
Tundla (SC)	SC	Ramesh Chandra Chanchal	Samajwadi Party
Etmadpur (SC)	SC	Chandra Bhan Maurya	Samajwadi Party
Dayalbagh	None	Udaybhan Singh	Bharatiya Janata Party
Agra Cantonment	None	Ramesh Kant Lawania	Bharatiya Janata Party
Agra East	None	Satya Prakash Vikal	Bharatiya Janata Party
Agra West (SC)	SC	Ram Babu Harit	Bharatiya Janata Party
Kheragarh	None	Mandleshwar Singh	Indian National Congress
Fatehpur Sikri	None	Badan Singh	Bharatiya Janata Party
Goverdhan (SC)	SC	Ajay Kumar	Bharatiya Janata Party
Mathura	None	Ram Swaroop	Bharatiya Janata Party
Chhata	None	Tejpal Singh	Janata Dal
Mant	None	Shyam Sunder Sharma	Indian National Congress
Gokul	None	Pranat Pal Singh	Bharatiya Janata Party
Sadabad	None	Vishamwar Singh	Janata Dal
Hathras	None	Rajveer Singh	Bharatiya Janata Party
Sasni (SC)	SC	Hari Shankar Mahor	Bharatiya Janata Party
Sikandara Rao	None	Amar Singh	Samajwadi Party
Gangiri	None	Veereshwar Singh Alias Veeresh Yadav	Samajwadi Party
Atrauli	None	Kalyan Singh	Bharatiya Janata Party
Aligarh	None	Krashan Kumar Navman	Bharatiya Janata Party
Koil (SC)	SC	Kishanlal Diler	Bharatiya Janata Party
Iglas	None	Vijendra Singh (toda Wale)	Indian National Congress
Barauli	None	Muneesh Gaur	Bharatiya Janata Party
Khair	None	Jagveer Singh	Janata Dal
Jewar (SC)	SC	Luxmi Chand	Bharatiya Janata Party
Khurja	None	Harpal Singh	Bharatiya Janata Party
Debai	None	Ram Singh	Bharatiya Janata Party
Anupshahr	None	Naval Kishor	Bharatiya Janata Party
Siana	None	Vasudev Singh	Bharatiya Janata Party
Agota	None	Kiran Pal Singh	Janata Dal
Bulandshahr	None	D. P. Yadav	Samajwadi Party
Shikarpur (SC)	SC	Ram Prasad	Bharatiya Janata Party
Sikandrabad	None	Virendra Pal Singh	Bharatiya Janata Party
Dadri	None	Sameer Bhati	Janata Dal
Ghaziabad	None	Baleshwar Tyagi	Bharatiya Janata Party
Muradnagar	None	Prem Singh	Janata Dal
Modinagar	None	Narendra Singh Shishodiya	Bharatiya Janata Party
Hapur (SC)	SC	Gajraj Singh	Indian National Congress
Garhmukteshwar	None	Krishanaveer Singh Sirohi	Bharatiya Janata Party
Kithore	None	Ramkrishan Verma	Bharatiya Janata Party
Sardhana	None	Ravindra Pundir	Bharatiya Janata Party
Meerut Cantonment	None	Amit Agrawal	Bharatiya Janata Party
Meerut	None	Akhlakh	Janata Dal
Kharkhauda	None	Jai Pal Singh	Bharatiya Janata Party
Siwalkhas	SC	Charan Singh	Janata Dal
Khekra	None	Madan Bhaiya	Samajwadi Party
Baghpat	None	Kaukab Hameed	Indian National Congress
Barnawa	None	Tripal Singh Dhama	Bharatiya Janata Party
Chhaprauli	None	Narendra Singh	Janata Dal
Kandhla	None	Ratan Pal Panwar	Bharatiya Janata Party
Khatauli	None	Sudhir Kumar Baliyan	Bharatiya Janata Party
Jansath (SC)	SC	Suresh Chand Titauria	Bharatiya Janata Party
Morna	None	Ram Pal Singh	Bharatiya Janata Party
Muzaffarnagar	None	Suresh Sangal	Bharatiya Janata Party
Charthawal (SC)	SC	Randhir Singh	Bharatiya Janata Party
Baghra	None	Harendra Singh	Janata Dal
Kairana	None	Munnavar Hasan	Janata Dal
Thana Bhawan	None	Jagat Singh	Bharatiya Janata Party
Nakur	None	Yash Pal Singh	Indian National Congress
Sarsawa	None	Nirbhay Pal Sharma	Indian National Congress
Nagal (SC)	SC	Mamchand	Bharatiya Janata Party
Deoband	None	Shasi Bala Pundir	Bharatiya Janata Party
Harora (SC)	SC	Mohar Singh	Bharatiya Janata Party
Saharanpur	None	Lal Krishan Gandhi	Bharatiya Janata Party
Muzaffarabad	None	Rani Deolata	Bharatiya Janata Party
Roorkee	None	Prithvi Singh Vikseet	Bharatiya Janata Party
Lhaksar	None	Tajpal Singh Panwar	Bharatiya Janata Party
Haridwar	None	Jagdish Muni	Bharatiya Janata Party
Mussoorie	None	Rajendra Singh	Bharatiya Janata Party
Dehra Dun	None	Harbans Kapoor	Bharatiya Janata Party
Chakrata (ST)	ST	Pritam Singh	Indian National Congress
