= Gutiyari Lal Duwesh =

Indian politician

MLA, 16th Legislative Assembly
- In office Mar 2012 – 2017
- Preceded by: Julfikar Ahmed Bhutto
- Succeeded by: Girraj Singh Dharmesh
- Constituency: Agra Cantt.

MLA, 15th Legislative Assembly
- In office May 2007 – Mar 2012
- Preceded by: Ram Babu Harit
- Succeeded by: None
- Constituency: Agra West

Personal details
- Born: 12 February 1970 (age 56) Bharatpur, Rajasthan
- Citizenship: India
- Party: Bahujan Samaj Party
- Spouse: Munni Devi Duwesh
- Parent: Akali Ram (Father)
- Profession: Businessman & politician

Gutiyari Lal Duwesh is an Indian politician and member of the 15th and the 16th Legislative assemblies of Uttar Pradesh. Duwesh represented the Agra Cantt. constituency of Uttar Pradesh and is a member of the Bahujan Samaj Party political party. On 12 March 2019, in Lucknow he has joined Bhartiya Janata Party and left Bahujan Samaj Party having the Supremo Km. Mayawati. This is one of the biggest shocks to the B.S.P. because since then, nothing is running smoothly in B.S.P. community.

== Early life and education ==
Gutiyari Lal Duwesh was born in the village Bartai in Bharatpur, Rajasthan, India in 1970. He belongs to the scheduled caste community (Jatav). Duwesh's highest attained education is high school. Prior to entering politics, he was a businessperson by profession.

== Political career ==
Gutiyari Lal Duwesh has been a MLA for two terms (2007 & 2012). During both his two terms, he represented Agra West (ceased to exist after "Delimitation of Parliamentary and Assembly Constituencies Order, 2008") and Agra Cantt. assembly constituencies respectively. He was a member of the Bahujan Samaj Party.

== Posts Held ==
#	From	To	Position	Comments
01	2007	2012	Member, 15th Legislative Assembly	
02	2012	2017	Member, 16th Legislative Assembly	

== See also ==
- Agra Cantt.
- Uttar Pradesh Legislative Assembly
- 16th Legislative Assembly of Uttar Pradesh
- Politics of India
- Bahujan Samaj Party
