= Karnaprayag Assembly constituency =

Constituency of the Uttarakhand legislative assembly in India

Coordinates: 30.26°N 79.22°E

Karnaprayag
- Constituency No. 6 for the Uttarakhand Legislative Assembly

Constituency details
- Country: India
- Region: North India
- State: Uttarakhand
- District: Chamoli
- Lok Sabha constituency: Garhwal
- Total electors: 94,018
- Reservation: None

Member of Legislative Assembly
- 5th Uttarakhand Legislative Assembly
- Incumbent Anil Nautiyal
- Party: Bharatiya Janata Party
- Elected year: 2022

Karnaprayag Legislative Assembly constituency is one of the 70 assembly constituencies of Uttarakhand a northern state of India. Karnaprayag is part of Garhwal Lok Sabha constituency.

== Members of Legislative Assembly ==
Election	Name	Party
1967	Y. Prasad	Indian National Congress
1969	Sher Singh Danu	Bharatiya Jana Sangh
1974	Shiva Nand Nautiyal	Indian National Congress
1977	Shiva Nand Nautiyal	Janata Party
1980	Shiva Nand Nautiyal	Independent politician
1985	Shiva Nand Nautiyal	Lok Dal
1989	Shivanand	Indian National Congress
1991	Ramesh Pokhriyal	Bharatiya Janata Party
1993	Ramesh Pokhriyal	Bharatiya Janata Party
1996	Ramesh Pokhriyal	Bharatiya Janata Party
Major boundary changes
2002	Anil Nautiyal	Bharatiya Janata Party
2007	Anil Nautiyal	Bharatiya Janata Party
2012	Anusuya Prasad Maikhuri	Indian National Congress
2017	Surendra Singh Negi	Bharatiya Janata Party
2022	Anil Nautiyal	Bharatiya Janata Party

== Election results ==
=== 2027 Assembly election ===
2027 Uttarakhand Legislative Assembly election: Karnaprayag
Party	Candidate	Votes	%	±%
INC				
BJP				
NOTA	None of the above			
Majority				
Turnout				
gain from		Swing		

=== Assembly Election 2022 ===
2022 Uttarakhand Legislative Assembly election: Karnaprayag
Party	Candidate	Votes	%	±%
BJP	Anil Nautiyal	28,911	49.01%	▼2.68
INC	Mukesh Negi	22,196	37.63%	▼0.21
Independent	Teeka Prasad Maikhuri	2,961	5.02%	New
Independent	Balwant Singh Negi	1,063	1.80%	New
NOTA	None of the above	936	1.59%	▲0.10
Independent	Madan Mohan Singh Bhandari	897	1.52%	New
CPI(ML)L	Indresh Maikhuri	590	1.00%	▼1.44
AAP	Dayal Singh Bisht	486	0.82%	New
UKD	Umesh Khanduri	464	0.79%	▼1.47
Margin of victory		6,715	11.38%	▼2.47
Turnout		58,988	60.17%	▲3.76
Registered electors		98,042		▲1.51
BJP hold		Swing	▼2.68	

=== Assembly Election 2017 ===
2017 Uttarakhand Legislative Assembly election: Karnaprayag
Party	Candidate	Votes	%	±%
BJP	Surendra Singh Negi	28,159	51.69%	▲34.81
INC	Anusuya Prasad Maikhuri	20,610	37.83%	▲15.28
CPI(ML)L	Indresh Maikhuri	1,331	2.44%	▲1.16
UKD	Balwant Singh Negi	1,232	2.26%	▲0.77
BSP	Jyoti Kanwasi	857	1.57%	▲0.53
NOTA	None of the above	810	1.49%	New
Independent	Bhagat Singh Negi	673	1.24%	New
Independent	Mohan Singh Negi	300	0.55%	New
Independent	Padam Singh	281	0.52%	New
Margin of victory		7,549	13.86%	▲13.40
Turnout		54,475	56.40%	▼2.56
Registered electors		96,579		▲15.24
BJP gain from INC		Swing	▲29.13	

=== Assembly Election 2012 ===
2012 Uttarakhand Legislative Assembly election: Karnaprayag
Party	Candidate	Votes	%	±%
INC	Anusuya Prasad Maikhuri	11,147	22.56%	▲2.89
Independent	Surendra Singh Negi	10,920	22.10%	New
BJP	Harish Pujari	8,343	16.88%	▼19.20
Independent	Anil Nautiyal	6,631	13.42%	New
Independent	Awatar Singh	3,576	7.24%	New
Independent	Neelam Chandra	3,093	6.26%	New
Independent	Arun Maithani	1,802	3.65%	New
URM	Vijayesh Nawani	1,543	3.12%	New
UKD	Chatur Singh Negi	738	1.49%	▼1.52
CPI(ML)L	Indresh Maikhuri	632	1.28%	New
BSP	Dhumi Lal	516	1.04%	▼8.80
Margin of victory		227	0.46%	▼15.96
Turnout		49,415	58.96%	▼0.34
Registered electors		83,807		
INC gain from BJP		Swing	▼13.52	

=== Assembly Election 2007 ===
2007 Uttarakhand Legislative Assembly election: Karnaprayag
Party	Candidate	Votes	%	±%
BJP	Anil Nautiyal	15,716	36.08%	▲9.14
INC	Prithvipal	8,565	19.66%	▼0.31
Independent	Surendra Singh Bisht	6,558	15.06%	New
BSP	Radhakrishna Bhatt	4,287	9.84%	▲7.13
Independent	Awatar Singh Pundir	1,996	4.58%	New
CPI(M)	Birendra Mingwal	1,348	3.09%	New
UKD	Geeta Bisht	1,313	3.01%	▼3.02
Independent	Ranjeet Singh	662	1.52%	New
Independent	Man Singh	610	1.40%	New
NCP	Birendra Singh Negi (Ghavri)	520	1.19%	▼20.96
BJSH	Pratap Singh	496	1.14%	New
Margin of victory		7,151	16.42%	▲11.63
Turnout		43,558	59.63%	▲4.70
Registered electors		73,445		
BJP hold		Swing	▲9.14	

=== Assembly Election 2002 ===
2002 Uttaranchal Legislative Assembly election: Karnaprayag
Party	Candidate	Votes	%	±%
BJP	Anil Nautiyal	9,224	26.94%	New
NCP	Surendra Singh	7,584	22.15%	New
INC	Bharat Singh Alias Bharat Singh Chaudhary	6,838	19.97%	New
Independent	Surendra Singh Bisht	3,630	10.60%	New
UKD	Madan Alias Dr. Madan Mohan Nawani	2,067	6.04%	New
Independent	Arjun Singh	933	2.73%	New
BSP	Shankar Kala	928	2.71%	New
Independent	Rajendra Singh	729	2.13%	New
CPI(ML)L	Kishan Singh	659	1.93%	New
SP	Surendra Singh	647	1.89%	New
LJP	Bhupal Singh	549	1.60%	New
Margin of victory		1,640	4.79%	
Turnout		34,233	54.64%	
Registered electors		62,688		
BJP win (new seat)				

== See also ==
- Garhwal (Lok Sabha constituency)
- Badrinath (Uttarakhand Assembly constituency)
- Tharali (Uttarakhand Assembly constituency)
