= Manzoor Ahmad (disambiguation) =

Manzoor Ahmad or variations may refer to:

- Manzoor Ahmad (born 1934), Pakistani scientist
- Manzoor Ahmad (politician) (1938–2002), Indian politician
- Mansoor Ahmed (1968–2018), Pakistani field hockey player
- Mansoor Ahmed (cricketer) (born 1981), Pakistani cricketer
- Manzoor Ahmed (born 1992), Pakistani footballer
