= Badri–Kedar Assembly constituency =

Former constituency of Uttarakhand, India

Coordinates: 30.74°N 79.29°E

Badri–Kedar
- Former constituency for the Uttarakhand Legislative Assembly

Constituency details
- Country: India
- Region: North India
- State: Uttarakhand
- District: Chamoli
- Established: 1967
- Abolished: 2002

Badri–Kedar Legislative Assembly constituency was a part of Uttar Pradesh Legislative Assembly from 1967 to 2000. It became a part of Interim Uttaranchal Assembly from 2000 to 2002.

== Members of Legislative Assembly ==
Key

INC Independent JP BJP

Election	Member	Party
1967	Ganga Dhar	Indian National Congress
1969	Narendra Singh	Independent
1974	Narendra Singh	Indian National Congress
1977	Pratap Singh	Janata Party
1980	Kunwar Singh Negi	Independent
1985	Santan Barthwal	Indian National Congress
1989	Kunwar Singh Negi	Indian National Congress
1991	Kedar Singh Phonia	Bharatiya Janata Party
1993	Kedar Singh Phonia	Bharatiya Janata Party
1996	Kedar Singh Phonia	Bharatiya Janata Party
Formation of Uttarakhand State; Major boundary changes
This Assembly constituency has been bifurcated into Badrinath and Kedarnath Assembly constituencies

== See also ==
- Badrinath (Uttarakhand Assembly constituency)
- Kedarnath (Uttarakhand Assembly constituency)
- Rudraprayag (Uttarakhand Assembly constituency)
- Chamoli district
