= Almora Assembly constituency =

Constituency of the Uttarakhand legislative assembly in India

Coordinates: 29.6°N 79.65°E

Almora
- Constituency No. 52 for the Uttarakhand Legislative Assembly

Constituency details
- Country: India
- Region: North India
- State: Uttarakhand
- District: Almora
- Lok Sabha constituency: Almora
- Total electors: 90,372
- Reservation: None

Member of Legislative Assembly
- 5th Uttarakhand Legislative Assembly
- Incumbent Manoj Tewari
- Party: Indian National Congress
- Elected year: 2022

Almora Legislative Assembly constituency is one of the 70 Legislative Assembly constituencies of Uttarakhand state in India.

It is part of Almora district.

== Member of the Legislative Assembly ==
Year	Member	Party
1957	Govind Singh	Bharatiya Jana Sangh
1962	Ganga Singh	Indian National Congress
1967	R Chandra	Bharatiya Jana Sangh
1969	Hari Singh	Indian National Congress
1974	Rama	Indian National Congress
1977	Shobhan Singh Jeena	Janata Party
1980	Govardhan	Indian National Congress
1985	Saraswati Devi	Indian National Congress
1989	Saraswati Devi	Indian National Congress
1991	Puran Chandra Sharma	Bhartiya Janata Party
1993	Govind Singh Kunjwal	Indian National Congress
1996	Raghunath Singh Chauhan	Bhartiya Janata Party
2002	Kailash Sharma	Bhartiya Janata Party
2007	Manoj Tiwari	Indian National Congress
2012	Manoj Tiwari	Indian National Congress
2017	Raghunath Singh Chauhan	Bharatiya Janata Party
2022	Manoj Tiwari	Indian National Congress

== Election results ==
=== 2027 Assembly election ===
2027 Uttarakhand Legislative Assembly election: Almora
Party	Candidate	Votes	%	±%
INC				
BJP				
NOTA	None of the above			
Majority				
Turnout				
gain from		Swing		

=== Assembly Election 2022 ===
2022 Uttarakhand Legislative Assembly election: Almora
Party	Candidate	Votes	%	±%
INC	Manoj Tiwari	24,439	44.90	▲4.60
BJP	Kailash Sharma	24,312	44.67	▼5.92
Independent	Vinay Kirola	2,067	3.80	New
AAP	Amit Joshi	1,665	3.06	New
UKD	Bhanu Prakash Joshi	518	0.95	New
Independent	Vinod Chandra Tiwari	413	0.76	New
None of the Above	Nota	401	0.74	▼0.45
BSP	Ashok Kumar	365	0.67	▼2.49
UKPP	Gopal Ram	136	0.25	New
Margin of victory		127	0.23	▼10.05
Turnout		54,428	59.42	▲0.55
Registered electors		91,603		▲3.07
INC gain from BJP		Swing	▼5.68	

=== Assembly Election 2017 ===
2017 Uttarakhand Legislative Assembly election: Almora
Party	Candidate	Votes	%	±%
BJP	Raghunath Singh Chauhan	26,464	50.58	▲19.00
INC	Manoj Tiwari	21,085	40.30	▲6.24
BSP	Dr. Sanjay Tamta	1,654	3.16	▼11.09
None of the Above	None of the Above	623	1.19	New
Independent	Virendra Kumar	517	0.99	New
Independent	Mohd Habib	514	0.98	New
CPI(M)	Dinesh Pande	425	0.81	New
Margin of victory		5,379	10.28	▲7.80
Turnout		52,316	58.86	▼1.76
Registered electors		88,878		▲13.22
BJP gain from INC		Swing	▲16.52	

=== Assembly Election 2012 ===
2012 Uttarakhand Legislative Assembly election: Almora
Party	Candidate	Votes	%	±%
INC	Manoj Tiwari	16,211	34.06	▼12.80
BJP	Raghunath Singh Chauhan	15,030	31.58	▼9.00
BSP	Shekhar Lakhchaura	6,781	14.25	▲10.34
Independent	Kailash Sharma	6,582	13.83	New
Independent	Bala Devi	977	2.05	New
Independent	Nandan Ram Tamta	543	1.14	New
Independent	Jaswant Singh Adhikari	507	1.07	New
URM	Shobha Joshi	421	0.88	New
SP	Arjun Bhakuni	274	0.58	▼0.46
UKPP	Ad. Govind Lal Verma	251	0.53	New
Margin of victory		1,181	2.48	▼3.80
Turnout		47,589	60.62	▼2.52
Registered electors		78,503		▲4.53
INC hold		Swing	▼12.80	

=== Assembly Election 2007 ===
2007 Uttarakhand Legislative Assembly election: Almora
Party	Candidate	Votes	%	±%
INC	Manoj Tiwari	22,223	46.86	▲22.17
BJP	Kailash Sharma	19,243	40.58	▲11.29
BJSH	Ravinder Singh	1,877	3.96	New
BSP	Karam Singh	1,854	3.91	▼6.14
UKD	Shamsher Singh Bisht	1,735	3.66	▼0.89
SP	Kishan Singh	489	1.03	▼0.85
Margin of victory		2,980	6.28	▲1.69
Turnout		47,421	63.18	▲12.64
Registered electors		75,104		▲8.66
INC gain from BJP		Swing	▲17.57	

=== Assembly Election 2002 ===
2002 Uttaranchal Legislative Assembly election: Almora
Party	Candidate	Votes	%	±%
BJP	Kailash Sharma	10,224	29.29	New
INC	Manoj Tiwari	8,620	24.70	New
Independent	Dharam Singh Mehara	7,629	21.86	New
BSP	Ashok / A. K. Sikandar Panwar	3,507	10.05	New
UKD	P. C. Tewari	1,587	4.55	New
Independent	Puran Singh Rayal	1,108	3.17	New
NCP	Avtar Singh Rawat	678	1.94	New
SP	Girish Singh Mehata	657	1.88	New
Bharatiya Berozgar Mazdoor Kisan Dal	Rajendra Singh Vani	584	1.67	New
SAP	Neeraj Nayal	310	0.89	New
Margin of victory		1,604	4.60	
Turnout		34,904	50.52	
Registered electors		69,116		
BJP win (new seat)				

== See also ==
- List of constituencies of the Uttarakhand Legislative Assembly
- Almora district
