= Kanalichhina Assembly constituency =

Former constituency of the Uttarakhand legislative assembly in India

Coordinates: 29.68°N 80.27°E

Kanalichhina
- Former constituency for the Uttarakhand Legislative Assembly

Constituency details
- Country: India
- Region: North India
- State: Uttarakhand
- District: Pithoragarh
- Established: 2002
- Abolished: 2012

Kanalichhina Legislative Assembly constituency was one of the seventy electoral Uttarakhand Legislative Assembly constituencies of Uttarakhand state in India. It was abolished in 2012 following the delimitation.

Kanalichhina Legislative Assembly constituency was a part of Almora (Lok Sabha constituency).

== Members of Legislative Assembly ==
Year	Name	Party
2002	Kashi Singh Airy	Uttarakhand Kranti Dal
2007	Mayukh Mahar	Indian National Congress

== Election results ==
=== Assembly Election 2007 ===
2007 Uttarakhand Legislative Assembly election: Kanalichhina
Party	Candidate	Votes	%	±%
INC	Mayukh Mahar	12,911	42.21%	▲23.66
UKD	Kashi Singh Airy	8,438	27.59%	▼7.37
BJP	Shanti Bhandari	6,231	20.37%	▼3.91
Independent	Dinesh Chandra	673	2.20%	New
NCP	Krishnanand	558	1.82%	New
SAP	Mamta Chand	548	1.79%	▼0.81
BSP	Mohan Chandra Garkoti	508	1.66%	▲0.73
SP	Chandra Singh	285	0.93%	▼0.39
AIFB	Sundar Singh	226	0.74%	New
BJSH	Mahesh Chandra Upadhyay	209	0.68%	New
Margin of victory		4,473	14.62%	▲3.94
Turnout		30,587	65.88%	▲8.10
Registered electors		46,435		▼0.00
INC gain from UKD		Swing	▲7.25	

=== Assembly Election 2002 ===
2002 Uttaranchal Legislative Assembly election: Kanalichhina
Party	Candidate	Votes	%	±%
UKD	Kashi Singh Airy	9,378	34.96%	New
BJP	Jagjeevan	6,513	24.28%	New
INC	Manoj Ojha	4,977	18.55%	New
Independent	Bahadur Singh Karki	1,287	4.80%	New
Uttarakhand Janwadi Party	Tara Chand	1,017	3.79%	New
Independent	Madan Mohan Bhatt	880	3.28%	New
Independent	Mahesh Singh	832	3.10%	New
SAP	Lt. Col. Jagmohan Chand Thakur	698	2.60%	New
Independent	Krishna Bahadur	400	1.49%	New
SP	Mohan Ram	354	1.32%	New
BSP	Raghubar	250	0.93%	New
Independent	Krishna Nand Kapri	240	0.89%	New
Margin of victory		2,865	10.68%	
Turnout		26,826	57.86%	
Registered electors		46,437		
UKD win (new seat)				

== See also ==
- Didihat (Uttarakhand Assembly constituency)
- Pithoragarh (Uttarakhand Assembly constituency)
