= Surendra Singh Negi (Karnprayag politician) =

Indian politician

Member of the Uttarakhand Legislative Assembly
- In office 2017–2022
- Preceded by: Anusuya Prasad Maikhuri
- Succeeded by: Anil Nautiyal
- Constituency: Karnaprayag

Personal details
- Born: 9 September 1968 (age 58)
- Party: Bharatiya Janata Party
- Education: Highschool

Surendra Singh Negi is an Indian politician and member of the Bharatiya Janata Party. Negi was a member of the Uttarakhand Legislative Assembly from the Karnaprayag Assembly constituency in Chamoli district from 2017 till 2022.
