= Raghunath Singh Chauhan =

Indian politician

Deputy Speaker of the Uttarakhand Legislative Assembly
- In office 28 March 2017 – 10 March 2022
- Preceded by: Anusuya Prasad Maikhuri
- Succeeded by: Vacant
- Constituency: Almora

MLA, Uttarakhand Legislative Assembly
- In office 2017–2022
- Preceded by: Manoj Tiwari
- Succeeded by: Manoj Tiwari
- Constituency: Almora

MLA, Uttar Pradesh Legislative Assembly
- In office 1996–2002
- Preceded by: Govind Singh Kunjwal
- Succeeded by: Kailash Sharma
- Constituency: Almora

Personal details
- Party: Bharatiya Janata Party

Raghunath Singh Chauhan is an Indian politician and member of the Bharatiya Janata Party from Uttarakhand. He was the deputy speaker of fourth Uttarkhand Legislative Assembly from 2017 till 2022. He is former MLA in the Uttarakhand Legislative Assembly representing Almora constituency. Previously Chauhan had been a member of the Uttar Pradesh Legislative Assembly from the Almora constituency in Almora district at the time when Almora was part of Uttar Pradesh.
