= Jageshwar Assembly constituency =

Constituency of the Uttarakhand legislative assembly in India

Coordinates: 29.64°N 79.85°E

Jageshwar
- Constituency No. 53 for the Uttarakhand Legislative Assembly

Constituency details
- Country: India
- Region: North India
- State: Uttarakhand
- District: Almora
- Lok Sabha constituency: Almora
- Total electors: 93,523
- Reservation: None

Member of Legislative Assembly
- 5th Uttarakhand Legislative Assembly
- Incumbent Mohan Singh Mahara
- Party: Bharatiya Janata Party
- Elected year: 2022

Jageshwar Legislative Assembly constituency is one of the 70 Legislative Assembly constituencies of Uttarakhand state in India.

It is part of Almora district.

== Members of the Legislative Assembly ==
Year	Member	Party
2002	Govind Singh Kunjwal	Indian National Congress
2007	Govind Singh Kunjwal	Indian National Congress
2012	Govind Singh Kunjwal	Indian National Congress
2017	Govind Singh Kunjwal	Indian National Congress
2022	Mohan Singh Mahara	Bharatiya Janata Party

== Election results ==
=== 2027 Assembly election ===
2027 Uttarakhand Legislative Assembly election: Jageshwar
Party	Candidate	Votes	%	±%
INC				
BJP				
NOTA	None of the above			
Majority				
Turnout				
gain from		Swing		

=== Assembly Election 2022 ===
2022 Uttarakhand Legislative Assembly election: Jageshwar
Party	Candidate	Votes	%	±%
BJP	Mohan Singh Mahara	27,530	52.04%	▲5.57
INC	Govind Singh Kunjwal	21,647	40.92%	▼6.33
UKD	Manish Singh Negi	936	1.77%	▲0.22
AAP	Taradatt Pandey	840	1.59%	New
NOTA	None of the above	823	1.56%	▼0.20
BSP	Narayan Ram	584	1.10%	▼1.53
SP	Ramesh Sanwal	269	0.51%	New
UKPP	Narayan Ram	268	0.51%	New
Margin of victory		5,883	11.12%	▲10.34
Turnout		52,897	55.91%	▼0.58
Registered electors		94,604		▲4.66
BJP gain from INC		Swing	▲4.79	

=== Assembly Election 2017 ===
2017 Uttarakhand Legislative Assembly election: Jageshwar
Party	Candidate	Votes	%	±%
INC	Govind Singh Kunjwal	24,132	47.26%	▲8.32
BJP	Subhash Pandey	23,733	46.48%	▲15.82
BSP	Taradatt Pandey	1,345	2.63%	▼3.43
NOTA	None of the above	896	1.75%	New
UKD	Mahendra Singh Rawat	793	1.55%	▼18.31
Margin of victory		399	0.78%	▼7.50
Turnout		51,066	56.50%	▼0.42
Registered electors		90,388		▲10.23
INC hold		Swing	▲8.32	

=== Assembly Election 2012 ===
2012 Uttarakhand Legislative Assembly election: Jageshwar
Party	Candidate	Votes	%	±%
INC	Govind Singh Kunjwal	18,175	38.94%	▼6.37
BJP	Bachi Singh	14,310	30.66%	▼11.84
UKD	Subhash Pandey	9,270	19.86%	▲15.73
BSP	Tara Datt	2,830	6.06%	▲2.43
Independent	Surendra Sahay Gupta	1,288	2.76%	New
UKPP	Kiran Arya	720	1.54%	New
Margin of victory		3,865	8.28%	▲5.47
Turnout		46,674	56.92%	▼3.70
Registered electors		81,998		
INC hold		Swing	▼6.37	

=== Assembly Election 2007 ===
2007 Uttarakhand Legislative Assembly election: Jageshwar
Party	Candidate	Votes	%	±%
INC	Govind Singh Kunjwal	18,154	45.31%	▲8.89
BJP	Raghunath Singh Chauhan	17,027	42.50%	▲13.40
UKD	Brahmanand	1,655	4.13%	▼13.05
BSP	Krishan Chandra Nailwal	1,457	3.64%	▲0.72
SP	Ramesh Sanwal	1,034	2.58%	New
Independent	Narmada Tiwari	735	1.83%	New
Margin of victory		1,127	2.81%	▼4.51
Turnout		40,062	60.65%	▲8.03
Registered electors		66,091		
INC hold		Swing	▲8.89	

=== Assembly Election 2002 ===
2002 Uttaranchal Legislative Assembly election: Jageshwar
Party	Candidate	Votes	%	±%
INC	Govind Singh Kunjwal	11,547	36.42%	New
BJP	Raghunath Singh Chauhan	9,225	29.10%	New
UKD	Subhash Chandra Pandey	5,447	17.18%	New
Independent	Tara Dutt Pandey	1,792	5.65%	New
BSP	Krishna Chandra	926	2.92%	New
Independent	Naveen Chandra Pandey	875	2.76%	New
LJP	Geeta Devi	779	2.46%	New
Independent	Dr. Chandra Singh Negi	695	2.19%	New
RLD	Dr. Hirdesh Deepali	415	1.31%	New
Margin of victory		2,322	7.32%	
Turnout		31,701	52.59%	
Registered electors		60,286		
INC win (new seat)				

== See also ==
- List of constituencies of the Uttarakhand Legislative Assembly
- Almora district
