= Manoj Tiwari (Uttarakhand politician) =

Indian politician

Manoj Tewari
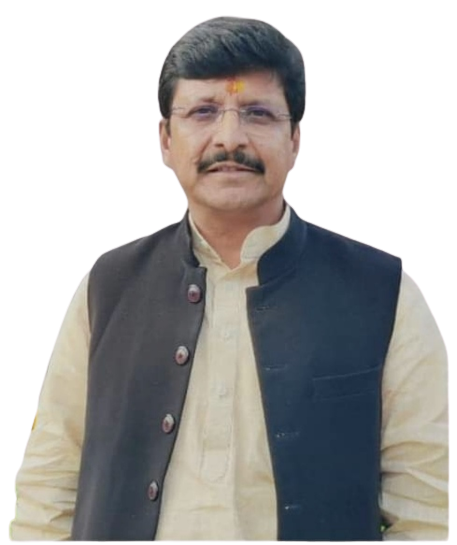

Member of Uttarakhand Legislative Assembly
- Incumbent
- Assumed office 2022
- Preceded by: Raghunath Singh Chauhan
- Constituency: Almora
- In office 2007–2017
- Preceded by: Kailash Sharma
- Succeeded by: Raghunath Singh Chauhan
- Constituency: Almora

Personal details
- Party: Indian National Congress
- Profession: MLA

Manoj Tewari is an Indian politician from Almora, Uttarakhand and a three term Member of the Uttarakhand Legislative Assembly. Manoj represented the Almora Assembly constituency in the 2nd, 3rd and 5th Uttarakhand legislative Assembly

== Electoral performance ==
Year	Election	Party	Constituency Name	Result	Votes gained	Vote share%	Margin
2002	1st Uttarakhand Assembly	Indian National Congress	Almora	Lost	8,620	24.70%	1,604
2007	2nd Uttarakhand Assembly	Indian National Congress	Almora	Won	22,223	46.86%	2,980
2012	3rd Uttarakhand Assembly	Indian National Congress	Almora	Won	16,211	34.07%	1,181
2017	4th Uttarakhand Assembly	Indian National Congress	Almora	Lost	21,085	41.07%	5,379
2022	5th Uttarakhand Assembly	Indian National Congress	Almora	Won	24,439	44.90%	127
