= Lilaram Sharma =

Indian politician and lawyer (1930-2012)

Member of Legislative assembly
- In office 1991–1993
- Preceded by: Kashi Singh Airy
- Succeeded by: Kashi Singh Airy
- Constituency: Didihaat

Personal details
- Born: 5 September 1930 Pithoragarh, Uttarakhand
- Died: 31 July 2012 (aged 81) Pithoragarh, Uttarakhand
- Party: Indian National Congress (since 1963)
- Other political affiliations: Praja Socialist Party (until 1963)
- Spouse: Basanti Devi
- Children: 4
- Education: L.L.B. and B.Sc from Allahbad University

Lilaram Sharma (5 September 1930 – 31 July 2012) was an Indian politician, social worker and lawyer who served as a MLA from Didihat Assembly constituency from 1991 till 1993 as a member of the Indian National Congress.

== Education ==
He had a degree of BSc from BITS, Pilani and L.L.B from Kanpur and was a professional lawyer.

== Political career ==
- 1962 – Contested from Pithoragarh Assembly constituency on PSP ticket but lost to Congress MLA Narendra Singh Bisht
- 1967 – Director, Parvatiya Vikas Parishad
- 1991 – Elected to Didihat on Congress ticket defeating former mla Narayan Singh Bhainsora.
- 2004 – Became Darja Rajya Mantri in N.D. Tiwari government

== Death ==
Sharma died on 31 July 2012, aged 81.
