= Lakhpat Singh Butola =

Indian politician

Member of Uttarakhand Legislative Assembly
- Incumbent
- Assumed office 13 July 2024
- Preceded by: Rajendra Singh Bhandari
- Constituency: Badrinath

Personal details
- Party: Indian National Congress

Lakhpat Singh Butola is an Indian politician from Uttarakhand. As a member of Indian National Congress, he is the incumbent MLA from Badrinath.
