= Girraj Singh Dharmesh =

Indian politician

Girraj Singh Dharmesh गिरिराज सिंह धर्मेश

Minister of State, Government of Uttar Pradesh
- In office 21 August 2019 – March 2022

Member of the Uttar Pradesh legislative assembly
- Incumbent
- Assumed office 2017
- Preceded by: Gutiyari Lal Duwesh
- Constituency: Agra Cantonment

Personal details
- Party: Bharatiya Janata Party
- Education: Agra University
- Occupation: MLA
- Profession: Politician

Girraj Singh Dharmesh is an Indian politician from the Bharatiya Janata Party. Dharmesh is a Member of the Uttar Pradesh Legislative Assembly from Agra Cantonment Constituency in Agra district.

He has been appointed Minister of state in a Yogi Adityanath cabinet on 21 August 2019.
