= Anil Baluni =

Indian politician

National Chief Spokesperson for Bharatiya Janata Party
- Incumbent
- Assumed office 26 September 2020
- President: J. P. Nadda; Nitin Nabin
- Preceded by: Shrikant Sharma

Member of Parliament, Lok Sabha
- Incumbent
- Assumed office 4 June 2024
- Preceded by: Tirath Singh Rawat
- Constituency: Garhwal

Member of Parliament, Rajya Sabha
- In office 3 April 2018 – 2 April 2024
- Preceded by: Mahendra Singh Mahra
- Succeeded by: Mahendra Bhatt
- Constituency: Uttarakhand

Personal details
- Born: 2 December 1970 (age 55) Pauri Garhwal, Uttarakhand
- Party: Bharatiya Janata Party
- Spouse: Deepti Joshi
- Children: 2
- Education: Delhi University (B.Com)
- Profession: Social Worker

Anil Baluni (born 2 December 1970) is an Indian politician who is serving as the chief spokesperson of the Bharatiya Janata Party. He is currently serving as a member of parliament from Garhwal Lok Sabha constituency since 2024. Prior to that, he also served as an MP for the Rajya Sabha from Uttarakhand from 2018 till 2024.

He was born in Pauri Garhwal of Uttarakhand but his official residences are Nainital and New Delhi.

== Personal life ==
He is married to Deepti Joshi and has a son and a daughter Ganga.

== Position Held ==
Year	Description
2018 - 2024	Elected to Rajya Sabha from Uttarakhand: Member - Committee on Science and Technology (2018–19); Member - Environment & Forests (2018–19); Member - AIIMS Rishikesh, Ministry of Health & Family Welfare (2019-2024); Member - Rajghat Samadhi Committee, Ministry of Urban Affairs & Employment (2019-2024); National Spokesperson BJP
2024–Present	Elected to Lok Sabha from Garhwal: Member - Committee on Communication and Information technology (2024–Present); Member - Member, The Joint Committee on the Constitution (One Hundred and Twenty– Ninth Amendment) Bill, 2024 and the Union Territories Laws (Amendment) Bill, 2024.; Member, Committee on Government Assurances (2025- till date); National Spokesperson BJP
