= Rajendra Singh Bhandari =

Indian politician

Member of the Uttarakhand Legislative Assembly
- In office 2022–2024
- Preceded by: Mahendra Bhatt
- Succeeded by: Lakhpat Singh Butola
- Constituency: Badrinath
- In office 2012–2017
- Preceded by: Kedar Singh Phonia
- Succeeded by: Mahendra Bhatt
- Constituency: Badrinath

Personal details
- Party: Bharatiya Janata Party (2024- Present)
- Other political affiliations: Indian National Congress (till 2024)
- Profession: Politician

Rajendra Singh Bhandari is an Indian politician and former MLA from Badrinath Assembly constituency. He is a Member of the Bhartiya Janta Party.

== Positions held ==
Year	Description
2007 - 2012	Elected to 2nd Uttarakhand Assembly (1st term): Cabinet Minister - Labour, Employment and training, Youth Welfare Sports, Khadi and Village Industries (2007-09); cabinet Minister - Panchayati Raj, Alternative Energy, Census Civil Defense and Home Guard, Jail (2009-12)
2012 - 2017	Elected to 3rd Uttarakhand Assembly (2nd term): Cabinet Minister - Agriculture, Agricultural Education Agricultural Marketing, Horticulture, Silk Development Soldier welfare, Medical Education, Rain water harvesting Bio-Technology (2016-17)
2022 - 2024	Elected to 5th Uttarakhand Assembly (3rd term)
