= Mahendra Bhatt =

Indian politician (born 1971)

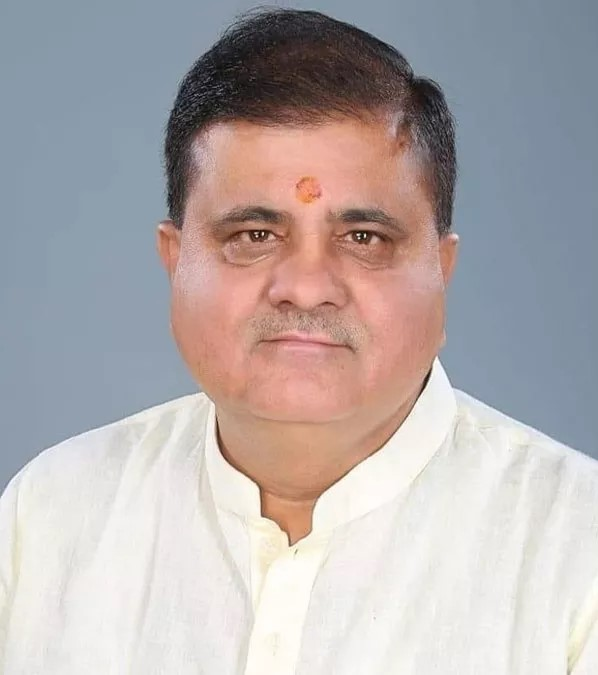
- Official portrait, 2024

Member of Parliament, Rajya Sabha
- Incumbent
- Assumed office 2 April 2024
- Preceded by: Anil Baluni
- Constituency: Uttarakhand

President of Bharatiya Janata Party, Uttarakhand
- Incumbent
- Assumed office 30 July 2022
- National President: J. P. Nadda; Nitin Nabin
- Preceded by: Madan Kaushik

Member of Uttarakhand Legislative Assembly
- In office 2017–2022
- Preceded by: Rajendra Singh Bhandari
- Succeeded by: Rajendra Singh Bhandari
- Constituency: Badrinath
- In office 2002–2007
- Preceded by: Constituency established
- Succeeded by: Rajendra Singh Bhandari
- Constituency: Nandaprayag

Personal details
- Born: 4 August 1971 (age 54) Brahmanthala, Uttar Pradesh, India (present day Uttarakhand)
- Party: Bharatiya Janata Party
- Spouse: Munni Devi (m. 1994)
- Children: 2 (1 son & 1 daughter)
- Education: M.Com
- Alma mater: Hemwati Nandan Bahuguna Garhwal University

Mahendra Bhatt (born 4 August 1971) is an Indian politician and member of the Bharatiya Janata Party. Mahendra Bhatt is currently serving as BJP Uttarakhand State President. He is also serving as an MP for the Rajya Sabha from Uttarakhand since 2024. Bhatt was a member of the Uttarakhand Legislative Assembly from the Badrinath constituency in Chamoli district (2017-2022) and from Nandprayag constituency (2002-2007).

== Positions held ==
Year	Description
2002 - 2007	Elected to 1st Uttarakhand Assembly
2017 - 2022	Elected to 4th Uttarakhand Assembly
2024–Present	Elected to Rajya Sabha from Uttarakhand

== Electoral performance ==
Election	Constituency	Party	Result	Votes %	Opposition Candidate	Opposition Party	Opposition vote %
2022	Badrinath	BJP	Lost	44.85%	Rajendra Singh Bhandari	INC	47.88%
2017	Badrinath	BJP	Won	46.42%	Rajendra Singh Bhandari	INC	37.60%
2007	Nandaprayag	BJP	Lost	19.87%	Rajendra Singh Bhandari	Independent	24.29%
2002	Nandaprayag	BJP	Won	20.71%	Satendra Bartwal	INC	15.74%

Rajya Sabha
Preceded by Anil Baluni	Member of Parliament for Uttarakhand; 2024 – present	Incumbent
Party political offices
Preceded by Madan Kaushik	President; Bharatiya Janata Party, Uttarakhand; 30 July 2022 – Present	Incumbent
