= Anusuya Prasad Maikhuri =

Indian politician (1961–2020)

Deputy Speaker of Uttarakhand Legislative Assembly
- In office 4 December 2012 – 20 March 2017
- Preceded by: Vacant
- Succeeded by: Raghunath Singh Chauhan

Member of Uttarakhand Legislative Assembly
- In office 2012–2017
- Preceded by: Anil Nautiyal
- Succeeded by: Surendra Singh Negi
- Constituency: Karnaprayag
- In office 2002–2007
- Preceded by: Constituency reestablised
- Succeeded by: Kedar Singh Phonia
- Constituency: Badrinath

Personal details
- Born: 4 April 1951 Maikhura, Chamoli, Uttar Pradesh, India
- Died: 5 December 2020 (aged 69) Dehradun, Uttarakhand, India
- Party: Indian National Congress

Anusuya Prasad Maikhuri (4 April 1951 – 5 December 2020) was an Indian politician. He was the Deputy Speaker of the Legislative Assembly in the state of Uttarakhand in India from 2012 to 2017. He was also MLA of the Karnprayag constituency from 2012 to 2017 and Badrinath constituency from 2002 to 2007.

In the Uttarakhand Assembly election of 2012, Maikhuri won the Karnaprayag constituency with a 227-vote margin. From 2002 to 2007, he was an elected MLA from the Badrinath constituency. Maikhuri and the former Speaker of the Assembly, Govind Singh Kunjwal, strongly favour the city of Gairsain as the permanent capital of Uttarakhand.

== Early life and education ==
Maikhuri was born in the village of Maikhura, of Karnaprayag tehsil, in Chamoli district, Uttarakhand. He received his MA, LLB, and Ph.D. from Hemwati Nandan Bahuguna Garhwal University. He served in the Sashastra Seema Bal for a short while but left job due to family reasons.

== Political career ==
Maikhuri's career began in village politics, as a Gram Pradhan of the village of Maikhura and then Pramukh of Karnaprayag block. In 2002, he won the assembly election from Badrinath, defeating Kedar Singh Phonia. He was also appointed Vice Chairman of Char Dham Vikas Parishad and Chairman of Badrinath Kedarnath Mandir Samiti from 2002 to 2007. In 2012, Maikhuri was elected to the Assembly from Karnaprayag. He was Deputy Speaker of the Uttarakhand Legislative Assembly from 2012 to 2017.

== Death ==
He died from complications from COVID-19 during the COVID-19 pandemic in India.
