= Hardwar Dubey =

Indian politician (1949–2023)

Member of Parliament, Rajya Sabha
- In office 26 November 2020 – 26 June 2023
- Preceded by: Chandrapal Singh Yadav
- Succeeded by: Dinesh Sharma
- Constituency: Uttar Pradesh

Minister of state for Finance Government of Uttar Pradesh
- In office 24 June 1991 – 6 December 1992
- Chief Minister: Kalyan Singh
- Minister: Rajendra Kumar Gupta

Member of Uttar Pradesh Legislative Assembly
- In office 1989–1993
- Preceded by: Krishna Vir Singh Kaushal
- Succeeded by: Ramesh Kant Lawania
- Constituency: Agra Cantonment

Personal details
- Born: 1 July 1949; Husainabad, Ballia, United Provinces, India
- Died: 26 June 2023 (aged 73); Delhi, India
- Political party: Bharatiya Janata Party
- Spouse: Dr. Kamla Pandey (m. 1978)
- Children: 1 son & 1 daughter
- Parents: Umashankar Dubey (father); Shyama Devi (mother)
- Education: M. A., LLB
- Alma mater: Agra University

Hardwar Dubey (1 July 1949 – 26 June 2023) was an Indian politician who was a Member of Parliament in the Rajya Sabha from Uttar Pradesh. He was a member of Uttar Pradesh Legislative Assembly from Agra Cantonment and minister of state in the Kalyan Singh ministry. He was a member of the Bharatiya Janata Party until his death.

== Early life ==
Dubey was originally from Ballia. He moved to Agra in 1969 and led Akhil Bharatiya Vidyarthi Parishad.

== Political career ==
In 1989, he contested and won the Agra Cantonment seat. He again won the 1991 elections and was made the minister of state for Finance in the Kalyan Singh ministry. Due to controversies, he resigned from the ministerial position within a year.

In 2005, he unsuccessfully contested by-elections from the Kheragarh Assembly seat. Earlier, he also lost in the Agra-Firozabad seat to the Uttar Pradesh Legislative Council election.

In 2011, he took over as BJP’s state spokesperson and in 2013 as state vice president.

== Death ==
Dubey died in Delhi on 26 June 2023, at the age of 73.
