= Julfikar Ahmed Bhutto =

Indian politician

Zulfiqar Ahmed Bhutto

Member of the Uttar Pradesh Legislative Assembly
- In office 2007–2012
- Constituency: Agra

Personal details
- Party: Bahujan Samaj Party
- Occupation: Politician businessman

Julfikar Ahmad Bhutto is an Indian politician who was a member of the 2007–2012 Uttar Pradesh Legislative Assembly for the Agra Cantonment Assembly constituency.
