= Anil Nautiyal =

Indian politician

Member of the Uttarakhand Legislative Assembly
- Incumbent
- Assumed office 2022
- Preceded by: Surendra Singh Negi
- Constituency: Karnaprayag
- In office 2002–2012
- Succeeded by: Anusuya Prasad Maikhuri
- Constituency: Karnaprayag

Personal details
- Born: 31 January 1958 (age 68) Village Sidoli, Uttarakhand, India
- Party: Bharatiya Janata Party
- Spouse: Shikha Nautiyal (m. 1987)
- Children: 2
- Parent: Late. Vidhyadutt Nautiyal (father)
- Education: Highschool
- Occupation: Politician

Anil Nautiyal is an Indian politician and member of the Bharatiya Janata Party. Nautiyal is a member of the Uttarakhand Legislative Assembly from the Karnaprayag constituency in Chamoli District.

Anil Nautiyal won 2022 Uttarakhand Legislative Assembly election by 6715 votes. He defeated Mukesh Negi of Indian National Congress.
