= Shiv Ram Kushwaha =

Indian politician

Member of the Uttar Pradesh Legislative Assembly
- In office 1989–1991
- Constituency: Madhogarh Assembly constituency
- In office 1993–1996

Personal details
- Born: 3 February 1946 (age 80)
- Party: Bahujan Samaj Party
- Spouse: Rammurti Devi Kushwaha
- Parent: Kamta Prasad Kushwaha

Shiv Ram Kushwaha (born 3 February 1946) was an Indian politician and a former member of Uttar Pradesh Legislative Assembly, who served as the member of Uttar Pradesh Legislative Assembly twice. He was elected to 12th Uttar Pradesh Legislative Assembly via 1993 Assembly elections on the ticket of Bahujan Samaj Party from Madhogarh Assembly constituency of Jalaun district of Uttar Pradesh.

== Life ==
Shiv Ram Singh Kushwaha was born to Kamta Prasad Kushwaha on 3 February 1946 in a locality called Baraha in Jalaun district of Uttar Pradesh. In his election affidavit submitted to Election Commission of India he declares himself to be an adherent of Hinduism and belonging to an Other Backward Class family. He held master's degree Sociology and Political Science. On 12 May 1964, after completing her education, he was married to Ram Murti Devi Kushwaha. They had three son and a daughter.

He was working as a lecturer before entering the politics through Bahujan Samaj Party. He was first elected to Uttar Pradesh Legislative Assembly in 1989 Assembly elections. This was followed by his re-election in the year 1993 to 12th Uttar Pradesh Legislative Assembly. He was also involved in activism for the downtrodden and was imprisoned in Lucknow and Urai prison in the year 1970 and 1981, due to his activism. In 1990, he also served as president of Uttar Pradesh wing of Kushwaha Mahasabha, a caste organisation.

He secured 40,871 votes in 1993 elections and defeated Keshav Singh of Bharatiya Janata Party. He also contested in 1991 Assembly elections from this constituency, in which he was defeated by Keshav Singh. However, he made a comeback after defeating Singh in 1993.
