= Mohan Singh Mahara =

Indian politician (born 1954)

Mohan Singh Mahara (born 1954) is an Indian politician from Uttarakhand. He is an MLA from Jageshwar Assembly constituency in Almora district. He won as an MLA in the 2022 Uttarakhand Legislative Assembly election representing the Bharatiya Janata Party.

== Early life and education ==
Mahara is from Jageshwar, Almora district, Uttarakhand. He is the son of Dalip Singh. He passed Class 10 and later discontinued his studies.

== Career ==
Mahara won from Jageshwar Assembly constituency representing the Bharatiya Janata Party in the 2022 Uttarakhand Legislative Assembly election. He polled 27,530 votes and defeated his nearest rival, Govind Singh Kunjwal of Indian National Congress, by a margin of 5,883 votes.
