= Didihat Assembly constituency =

Constituency of the Uttarakhand legislative assembly in India

Coordinates: 29.8°N 80.23°E

Didihat
- Constituency No. 43 for the Uttarakhand Legislative Assembly

Constituency details
- Country: India
- Region: North India
- State: Uttarakhand
- District: Pithoragarh
- Lok Sabha constituency: Almora
- Established: 1967
- Total electors: 82,849
- Reservation: None

Member of Legislative Assembly
- 5th Uttarakhand Legislative Assembly
- Incumbent Bishan Singh Chuphal
- Party: Bharatiya Janata Party
- Elected year: 2022

Didihat Legislative Assembly constituency is one of the 70 Legislative Assembly constituencies of Uttarakhand state in India.

It is part of Pithoragarh district.

== Members of the Legislative Assembly ==
Election	Member	Party
1967	Gopal Dutt Ojha	Indian National Congress
1969	Gopal Dutt Ojha	Indian National Congress
1974	Gopal Dutt Ojha	Indian National Congress
1977	Narayan Singh Bhainsora	Janata Party
1980	Charu Chandra Ojha	Indian National Congress
1985	Kashi Singh Airy	Independent politician
1989	Kashi Singh Airy	Independent politician
1991	Lilaram Sharma	Indian National Congress
1993	Kashi Singh Airy	Uttarakhand Kranti Dal
1996	Bishan Singh Chuphal	Bharatiya Janata Party
Major boundary changes
2002	Bishan Singh Chuphal	Bharatiya Janata Party
2007	Bishan Singh Chuphal	Bharatiya Janata Party
Major boundary changes
2012	Bishan Singh Chuphal	Bharatiya Janata Party
2017	Bishan Singh Chuphal	Bharatiya Janata Party
2022	Bishan Singh Chuphal	Bharatiya Janata Party

== Election results ==
=== 2027 Assembly election ===
2027 Uttarakhand Legislative Assembly election: Didihat
Party	Candidate	Votes	%	±%
INC				
BJP				
NOTA	None of the above			
Majority				
Turnout				
gain from		Swing		

=== Assembly Election 2022 ===
2022 Uttarakhand Legislative Assembly election: Didihat
Party	Candidate	Votes	%	±%
BJP	Bishan Singh Chuphal	20,594	37.69%	▲4.07
Independent	Kishan Bhandari	17,368	31.79%	New
INC	Pradeep Singh Pal	14,298	26.17%	▼1.80
NOTA	None of the above	831	1.52%	▲0.10
UKD	Govind Singh	717	1.31%	▼4.29
AAP	Diwan Singh Mehta	340	0.62%	New
Independent	Anil Singh	313	0.57%	New
SP	Surendra Singh Gurung	180	0.33%	New
Margin of victory		3,226	5.90%	▲1.33
Turnout		54,641	62.58%	▲1.47
Registered electors		87,311		▲3.13
BJP hold		Swing	▲4.07	

=== Assembly Election 2017 ===
2017 Uttarakhand Legislative Assembly election: Didihat
Party	Candidate	Votes	%	±%
BJP	Bishan Singh Chuphal	17,392	33.61%	▼12.83
Independent	Kishan Bhandari	15,024	29.04%	New
INC	Pradeep Singh Pal	14,470	27.97%	▲4.91
UKD	Kashi Singh Airy	2,896	5.60%	New
NOTA	None of the above	737	1.42%	New
BSP	Har Govind Pant	631	1.22%	▼21.20
Independent	Bikrant Panday	520	1.01%	New
Margin of victory		2,368	4.58%	▼18.80
Turnout		51,739	61.11%	▲0.93
Registered electors		84,662		▲12.20
BJP hold		Swing	▼12.83	

=== Assembly Election 2012 ===
2012 Uttarakhand Legislative Assembly election: Didihat
Party	Candidate	Votes	%	±%
BJP	Bishan Singh Chuphal	21,089	46.44%	▲15.27
INC	Rewati Joshi	10,472	23.06%	▼2.40
BSP	Jagjiwan Kanyal	10,183	22.42%	▲20.00
NCP	Diwan Singh	1,273	2.80%	New
UKPP	Krishnanand	839	1.85%	New
Independent	Jagdish Chand	817	1.80%	New
URM	Moti Ram Sagar	408	0.90%	New
Margin of victory		10,617	23.38%	▲17.67
Turnout		45,410	60.18%	▼1.43
Registered electors		75,458		▲15.83
BJP hold		Swing	▲15.27	

=== Assembly Election 2007 ===
2007 Uttarakhand Legislative Assembly election: Didihat
Party	Candidate	Votes	%	±%
BJP	Bishan Singh Chuphal	12,512	31.17%	▼8.14
INC	Hem Pant	10,218	25.46%	▲2.49
AIFB	Gajendra Singh	5,858	14.59%	New
Independent	Jagjeevan Kanyal	5,840	14.55%	New
UKD	Ghanshyam Joshi	2,914	7.26%	▼18.57
BSP	Yogesh	973	2.42%	▲0.78
Independent	Chandra Singh Karki	947	2.36%	New
SP	Kharak Singh	876	2.18%	▼0.06
Margin of victory		2,294	5.72%	▼7.77
Turnout		40,138	61.68%	▲9.24
Registered electors		65,148		▲2.36
BJP hold		Swing	▼8.14	

=== Assembly Election 2002 ===
2002 Uttaranchal Legislative Assembly election: Didihat
Party	Candidate	Votes	%	±%
BJP	Bishan Singh Chuphal	13,104	39.32%	▲1.20
UKD	Ghanshyam Joshi	8,609	25.83%	▼4.50
INC	Ramesh Chandra Kapri	7,655	22.97%	▲6.53
Independent	Basanti Devi	1,458	4.37%	New
Uttarakhand Janwadi Party	Kewla Nand Pant	1,206	3.62%	New
SP	Kamla Karki	749	2.25%	New
BSP	Jeet Ram	549	1.65%	New
Margin of victory		4,495	13.49%	▲5.70
Turnout		33,330	52.53%	
Registered electors		63,644		
BJP hold		Swing	▲1.20	

=== Assembly Election 1996 ===
1996 Uttar Pradesh Legislative Assembly election: Didihat
Party	Candidate	Votes	%	±%
BJP	Bishan Singh Chuphal	29,729	38.12%	
UKD	Kashi Singh Airy	23,658	30.33%	
INC	Gopal Dutt Ojha	12,822	16.44%	
AIIC(T)	Ramesh Chandra Kapri	7,328	9.40%	
Independent	Gajendra Singh	4,242	5.44%	
Independent	Govind Singh Kafaliya	217	0.28%	
Majority		6,071	7.79%	
Turnout		77,996	45.47%	
BJP gain from UKD		Swing		

=== Assembly Election 1993 ===
1993 Uttar Pradesh Legislative Assembly election: Didihat
Party	Candidate	Votes	%	±%
UKD	Kashi Singh Airy	22,623	35.88	
INC	Lilaram Sharma	22,377	35.49	
BJP	Jag Jiwan Singh Kanyal	16,274	25.81	
Independent	Kunwar Singh	594	0.94	
JD	Ganesh Singh Rautela	455	0.72	
Independent	Mena Bohra	379	0.60	
Doordarshi Party	Mahendra Singh	356	0.56	
Majority		246	0.39	
Turnout		63,058	41.95	
Registered electors		153,194		
UKD gain from INC		Swing		

=== Assembly Election 1991 ===
1991 Uttar Pradesh Legislative Assembly election: Didihat
Party	Candidate	Votes	%	±%
INC	Lilaram Sharma	24,534	39.50	
BJP	Narayan Singh Bhainsora	17,112	27.55	
UKD	Kashi Singh Airy	14,048	22.62	
Majority		7,422	11.95	
Turnout		62,104	39.17	
Registered electors		158,546		
INC gain from Independent		Swing		

=== Assembly Election 1989 ===
1989 Uttar Pradesh Legislative Assembly election: Didihat
Party	Candidate	Votes	%	±%
Independent	Kashi Singh Airy	29,286	43.37	
INC	Lilaram Sharma	28,763	42.60	
Independent	Uma Pandeya	773	1.14	
Doordarshi Party	Ram Prasad	686	1.02	
Majority		523	0.77	
Turnout		67,519	42.76	
Registered electors		157,895		
Independent hold		Swing		

=== Assembly Election 1985 ===
1985 Uttar Pradesh Legislative Assembly election: Didihat
Party	Candidate	Votes	%	±%
Independent	Kashi Singh Airy	23,715	47.04%	▲44.84
INC	Charu Chandra Ojha	20,660	40.98%	▼14.70
BJP	Lal Singh	5,564	11.04%	▼8.32
Doordarshi Party	Satish Chandra	471	0.93%	New
Majority		3,055	6.06%	▼30.26
Turnout		50,410	39.00%	▲11.38
Registered electors		129,255		
Independent gain from INC		Swing	▲44.84	

=== Assembly Election 1980 ===
1980 Uttar Pradesh Legislative Assembly election: Didihat
Party	Candidate	Votes	%	±%
INC	Charu Chandra Ojha	17,622	55.68%	▲25.20
BJP	Narayan Singh Bhainsora	6,127	19.36%	New
Independent	Lilaram Sharma	4,104	12.97%	New
Independent	Jagjiwan Singh Kanyal	1,875	5.92%	New
Independent	Ratan Singh	730	2.31%	New
Independent	Kashi Singh Airy	697	2.20%	New
Independent	Ratan Singh Dhami	491	1.55%	New
Majority		11,495	36.32%	▲16.10
Turnout		31,646	27.62%	▼1.26
INC gain from JP		Swing	▲25.20	

=== Assembly Election 1977 ===
1977 Uttar Pradesh Legislative Assembly election: Didihat
Party	Candidate	Votes	%	±%
JP	Narayan Singh Bhainsora	15,246	50.70%	New
INC	Charu Chandra Ojha	9,165	30.48%	▼15.74
Independent	Kalu Ram	3,082	10.25%	New
Independent	Shankar Datt Bhatt	1,303	4.33%	New
Independent	Diwani Ram	1,273	4.23%	New
Majority		6,081	20.22%	▲18.48
Turnout		30,069	28.88%	▼0.52
JP gain from INC		Swing	▲50.70	

=== 1974 Assembly Election ===
1974 Uttar Pradesh Legislative Assembly election: Didihat
Party	Candidate	Votes	%	±%
INC	Gopal Dutt Ojha	12,410	46.22%	▼4.88
Independent	Narayan Singh Bhainsora	11,942	44.48%	▲4.38
Independent	Kundan Singh	2,500	9.30%	New
Margin of victory		468	1.74%	▼9.26
Turnout		26,852	29.40%	▲1.30
INC hold		Swing	▼4.88	

=== 1969 Assembly Election ===
1969 Uttar Pradesh Legislative Assembly election: Didihat
Party	Candidate	Votes	%	±%
INC	Gopal Dutt Ojha	11,624	51.10%	▼7.02
Independent	Narayan Singh Bhainsora	9,122	40.10%	▲9.44
ABJS	Kishor Singh	2,001	8.80%	New
Margin of victory		2,502	11.00%	▼16.46
Turnout		22,747	28.10%	▼0.02
INC hold		Swing	▼7.02	

=== 1967 Assembly Election ===
1967 Uttar Pradesh Legislative Assembly election: Didihat
Party	Candidate	Votes	%	±%
INC	Gopal Dutt Ojha	13,542	58.12%	New
Independent	Narayan Singh Bhainsora	7,144	30.66%	New
Independent	G. S. Mehra	2,614	11.22%	New
Margin of victory		6,398	27.46%	New
Turnout		23,300	28.12%	New
Registered electors		82,849		
INC win (new seat)				

== See also ==
- List of constituencies of the Uttarakhand Legislative Assembly
- Pithoragarh district
