= Badrinath Assembly constituency =

Constituency of the Uttarakhand legislative assembly in India

Coordinates: 30.74°N 79.49°E

Badrinath
- Constituency No. 4 for the Uttarakhand Legislative Assembly

Constituency details
- Country: India
- Region: North India
- State: Uttarakhand
- District: Chamoli
- Lok Sabha constituency: Garhwal
- Total electors: 102,237
- Reservation: None

Member of Legislative Assembly
- 5th Uttarakhand Legislative Assembly
- Incumbent Lakhpat Singh Butola
- Party: Indian National Congress
- Elected year: 2024

Badrinath Legislative Assembly constituency is one of the 70 assembly constituencies of Uttarakhand a northern state of India. Badrinath is part of Garhwal Lok Sabha constituency.

== Members of Legislative Assembly ==
Year	Name	Party
1957	Ghyansham	Independent politician
1962	Yogeshwar Prasad Khanduri	Indian National Congress
1967–2002 : Constituency abolished, see Badri-Kedar Assembly constituency
2002	Anusuya Prasad Maikhuri	Indian National Congress
2007	Kedar Singh Phonia	Bharatiya Janata Party
2012	Rajendra Singh Bhandari	Indian National Congress
2017	Mahendra Bhatt	Bharatiya Janata Party
2022	Rajendra Singh Bhandari	Indian National Congress
2024^	Lakhpat Singh Butola	Indian National Congress

^By-election

== Election results ==
=== 2027 Assembly election ===
2027 Uttarakhand Legislative Assembly election: Badrinath
Party	Candidate	Votes	%	±%
INC				
BJP				
NOTA	None of the above			
Majority				
Turnout				
gain from		Swing		

=== 2024 by-election ===
Uttarakhand Legislative Assembly by-election 2024: Badrinath
Party	Candidate	Votes	%	±%
INC	Lakhpat Singh Butola	28,167	51.93	▲4.05
BJP	Rajendra Singh Bhandari	22,937	42.30	▼2.55
Independent	Naval Kishore Khali	1,813	3.34	New
NOTA	None of the Above	823	1.52	▲0.24
Majority		5,230	9.9	▲6.87
Turnout		54,228	49.8	▼15.29
INC hold		Swing		

=== Assembly Election 2022 ===
2022 Uttarakhand Legislative Assembly election: Badrinath
Party	Candidate	Votes	%	±%
INC	Rajendra Singh Bhandari	32,661	47.88	▲10.28
BJP	Mahendra Bhatt	30,595	44.85	▼1.56
AAP	Bhagwati Prasad Mandoli	871	1.28	New
NOTA	None of the Above	853	1.25	▲0.17
CPI	Vinod Joshi	798	1.17	▼2.55
BSP	Mukesh Lal Koshwal	552	0.81	▼1.77
Margin of victory		2,066	3.03	▼5.78
Turnout		68,211	65.09	▲2.25
Registered electors		1,04,795		▲3.00
INC gain from BJP		Swing	▲1.46	

=== Assembly Election 2017 ===
2017 Uttarakhand Legislative Assembly election: Badrinath
Party	Candidate	Votes	%	±%
BJP	Mahendra Bhatt	29,676	46.42	▲25.98
INC	Rajendra Singh Bhandari	24,042	37.60	▼1.30
CPI	Bharat Singh Kunwar	2,380	3.72	▼4.75
Independent	Vinod Fonia	2,370	3.71	New
BSP	Mukesh Lal Koshwal	1,652	2.58	▼0.44
Independent	Aruna Danwashi	916	1.43	New
SP	Keerat Singh Bhandari	859	1.34	▲0.30
NOTA	None of the Above	691	1.08	New
UKD	Devendra Singh Negi	487	0.76	New
Independent	Laxmi Prasad Sati	335	0.52	New
Margin of victory		5,634	8.81	▼9.65
Turnout		63,933	62.84	▼1.58
Registered electors		1,01,740		▲18.64
BJP gain from INC		Swing	▲7.51	

=== Assembly Election 2012 ===
2012 Uttarakhand Legislative Assembly election: Badrinath
Party	Candidate	Votes	%	±%
INC	Rajendra Singh Bhandari	21,492	38.90	▲6.78
BJP	Prem Ballabh Bhatt	11,291	20.44	▼21.43
URM	Kedar Singh Phonia	7,511	13.60	New
Independent	Nandan Singh Bisht	5,803	10.50	New
CPI	Anand Singh	4,681	8.47	New
BSP	Sabar Singh	1,671	3.02	▲0.27
Independent	Pankaj Vyas	1,267	2.29	New
LJP	Mohan Lal Bharti	699	1.27	New
SP	Alok Meherwal	579	1.05	New
Margin of victory		10,201	18.46	▲8.72
Turnout		55,246	64.42	▲1.85
Registered electors		85,758		▲35.30
INC gain from BJP		Swing	▼2.97	

=== Assembly Election 2007 ===
2007 Uttarakhand Legislative Assembly election: Badrinath
Party	Candidate	Votes	%	±%
BJP	Kedar Singh Phonia	16,607	41.87	▲10.15
INC	Dr. Anusuya Prasad Maikhuri	12,742	32.13	▼2.69
Independent	Bhawan Singh Chuahan	2,821	7.11	New
UKD	Devendar Singh Pharswan	2,505	6.32	▲4.36
BJSH	Indra Prakash Pant	1,384	3.49	New
BSP	Devendra Singh Negi	1,093	2.76	▼1.66
Independent	Bachi Ram Uniyal	786	1.98	New
CPI(ML)L	Atul Sati	366	0.92	New
Independent	Ganeshi Devi	366	0.92	New
NCP	Surendra Singh Bhilangwal	361	0.91	New
Independent	Indra Singh Bisht	259	0.65	New
Bhartiya Mahashakti Morcha	Badrish Lal	204	0.50	New
SAP	Kishan Singh	169	0.40	New
Margin of victory		3,865	9.74	▲6.65
Turnout		39,663	62.76	▲8.91
Registered electors		63,384		▲6.25
BJP gain from INC		Swing	▲7.06	

=== Assembly Election 2002 ===
2002 Uttaranchal Legislative Assembly election: Badrinath
Party	Candidate	Votes	%	±%
INC	Dr. Anusuya Prasad Maikhuri	11,145	34.81	New
BJP	Kedar Singh Phonia	10,154	31.72	New
CPI	Bharat Singh	3,043	9.50	New
Independent	Devendra Singh Farswan	1,572	4.91	New
BSP	Bachan Lal	1,413	4.41	New
Independent	Bachi Ram Uniyal	1,104	3.45	New
Independent	Dheerendra Singh Bisht (Dheeru Pradhan)	1,027	3.21	New
UKD	Arun Kumar	625	1.95	New
SP	Sabar Singh Kunwar	597	1.86	New
Independent	Ashok Hatwal	580	1.81	New
Uttarakhand Janwadi Party	Bhagwati Prasd Namburi	437	1.36	New
Nyaynishth Prajatantra	Indra Singh Sanwal	319	1.00	New
Margin of victory		991	3.10	
Turnout		32,016	53.77	
Registered electors		59,656		
INC win (new seat)				

== See also ==
- Badri–Kedar (Uttarakhand Assembly constituency)
