= Mansoor Ahmed (cricketer) =

Pakistani cricketer (born 1981)

Personal information
- Born: 10 September 1981 (age 45); Karachi, Pakistan
- Source: Cricinfo, 18 March 2021

Mansoor Ahmed (born 10 September 1981) is a Pakistani cricketer. He played in 44 first-class and 13 List A matches between 1999 and 2015.
