= Nidhauli Kalan =

- Town
- Location in Uttar Pradesh, India
- Coordinates: 27°35′N 78°30′E
- Country: India
- State: Uttar Pradesh
- District: Etah

Population (2001)
  - Total: 7,500

Languages
  - Official: Hindi
- Time zone: UTC+5:30 (IST)

Nidhauli Kalan is a town and a nagar panchayat in Sub District - Awagarh, Etah district in the Indian state of Uttar Pradesh.

== Demographics ==
As of 2001 India census, Nidhauli Kalan had a population of 7500. Males constitute 55% of the population and females 45%. Nidhauli Kalan has an average literacy rate of 48%, lower than the national average of 59.5%: male literacy is 55%, and female literacy is 40%. In Nidhauli Kalan, 17% of the population is under six years of age.
