= Kashi Singh Airy =

Indian politician (born 1953)

Member, Uttarakhand Legislative Assembly
- In office 2002–2007
- Preceded by: Constituency established
- Succeeded by: Mayukh Mahar
- Constituency: Kanalichhina

Member of Legislative assembly
- In office 1993–1996
- Preceded by: Lilaram Sharma
- Succeeded by: Bishan Singh Chuphal
- Constituency: Didihaat
- In office 1985–1991
- Preceded by: Charu Chandra Ojha
- Succeeded by: Lilaram Sharma

Personal details
- Born: 1 June 1953 (age 73) Dharchula, Uttarakhand, India
- Party: Uttarakhand Kranti Dal
- Education: L.L.B, M.Sc (Botany), M.A. from Kumaon University

Kashi Singh Airy (Hindi: काशी सिंह ऐरी; born 1 June 1953) is the leader and founding member of Uttarakhand Kranti Dal and a former member of the Uttar Pradesh Legislative Assembly and Uttarakhand Legislative Assembly. He founded the party in 1979 along with Bipin Chandra Tripathi, D. D. Pant and Indramani Badoni.

== Early life ==
Kashi Singh Airy was born on 1 June 1953, in Panthagaon village in Dharchula, Pithoragarh to Kehar Singh and mother Sunita Devi. He had his primary and secondary education at Baluwakot. He passed his intermediate education from GIC Narayan Nagar, Didihat and went to Pithoragarh for graduation, start student leadership, in 1973 he was elected vice president of student union GPGC Pithoragarh. After completing BSc he went to Nainital to pursue higher studies where he completed his post-graduation in M.Sc. in Botany in 1976 and M.A. in Social Science (Gold medal) from Kumaon University, and LL.B in 1988 from Lucknow University.

== Political career ==
As an activist for Uttarakhand Statehood Movement, he founded party Uttarakhand Kranti Dal with Bipin Chandra Tripathi, D. D. Pant and Indramani Badoni in Mussoorie on 25 July 1979. He served as MLA three times in Uttar Pradesh Legislative Assembly (1985–89, 1989–91 and 1993–96) from Didihat assembly constituency and after the creation of new state Uttarakhand on 9 November 2000 (then Uttaranchal) he served as a member in 1st Uttarakhand Legislative Assembly (2002–07) from Kanalichhina Assembly constituency.
