= Ram Babu Harit =

Indian politician

Dr Ram Babu Harit
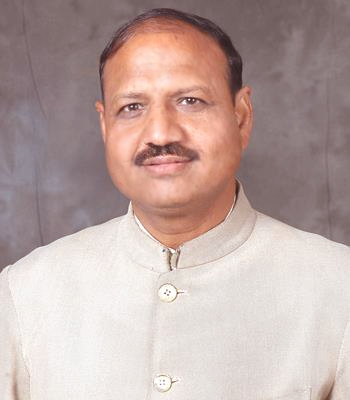
- Born: 02/02/1957; Agra, Uttar Pradesh, India
- Education: Motilal Nehru Medical College, University of Allahabad
- Occupations: Doctor; Politician; Businessman; Philanthropist; Social Worker
- Title: Ex- Minister of Health, Ex- MLA
- Spouse: Kamlesh Kumari
- Parent(s): Sita Ram Harit and Badami Devi

Dr. Ram Babu Harit is an Indian politician and member of the Bhartiya Janta Party. Harit was a member of the Uttar Pradesh Legislative Assembly from the Agra West constituency in Agra district as Bharatiya Janata Party candidate.
