= Gopal Dutt Ojha =

Indian politician and social worker (1932–2022)

Member of Legislative assembly
- In office 1967–1977
- Preceded by: Constituency established
- Succeeded by: Narayan Singh Bhainsora
- Constituency: Didihaat

Personal details
- Born: 27 May 1932 Didihat, Pithoragarh, Uttarakhand
- Died: 7 January 2022 (aged 89) Pithoragarh, Uttarakhand
- Party: INC
- Education: L.L.B. and B.A. from Allahabad University

Gopal Dutt Ojha (27 May 1932 – 7 January 2022) was an Indian politician and social worker who served as a three time MLA from Didihat Assembly constituency as a member of the Indian National Congress. Ojha was the first elected MLA from Didihat constituency of Pithoragarh district.

He was a Gandhian leader who did much for the society.

== Education ==
He had a degree of B.A and L.L.B and was a former professional lawyer.

Ojha once said that he chose Congress because he can relate to the views of the party. In the year 1967, he was elected as MLA from Didihaat. He was re-elected in 1969 and 1974.

== Political career ==
- 1962–1967 – President of Corporative bank
- 1967 – Elected to Didihat on Congress ticket (1st term)
- 1969 – Elected to Didihat on Congress ticket (2nd term)
- 1974 – Elected to Didihat on Congress ticket (3rd term)
- 1982–1989 – President of Pithoragarh district congress committee
- 1996–2005 – Member of Akhil Bharatiya congress committee

== Personal life ==
Ojha died at the age of 89 years on a Friday morning on the 7 January 2022. His last rites were performed at Rameshwar Ghat.
