= Ram Saran Verma =

Padma Shri awardee farmer from India

Ram Saran Verma (born 1968) is an Indian farmer recognized for introducing advanced and more profitable farming techniques to small Indian farmers and rural villages in his state. Verma has received numerous Indian farming awards for his work, and his farming techniques have been studied and replicated across his state. In 2019, he was honored India's fourth highest civilian award, the Padma Shri.

== Biography ==
Ram Saran Verman hails from Daulatpur village in Barabanki district of the Indian state of Uttar Pradesh. He dropped out of school in 8th grade and inherited 6 acres of farmland from his father. In 1984, he went on a tour of the states of Gujarat, Maharashtra, Haryana and Punjab to interact and learn from successful rural farmers and farming experts in those states. Using this experience, he introduced banana cultivation to his fields, which traditionally grew wheat, rice, sugarcane and mustard, and was one of the first farmers to introduce tissue culture farming in the state of Uttar Pradesh. Ram Saran Verma currently oversees farming on 150 acres of land, which directly and indirectly supports circa 20,000 people. He conducts free training sessions for agriculturalists from around the country.

He has been called the rural "high-tech farmer" by the Indian media, for introducing advanced farming techniques to improve yields in banana, tomato and potato crops for small rural Indian farmers. News18 India reported that at a function in 2012 to honour Ramsharan Verma, former Indian President A. P. J. Abdul Kalam called him a "farmer's wizard", and separately, that he had produced "gold from the soil". In 2014, India Today featured Ram Saran Verma as a "Field Revolutionary" and profiled him as one of the "changemakers" influencing India from a micro-level.

He is a recipient of the Jagjivan Ram Kisan Puraskar in 2007 and 2010 and the National Horticultural Award in 2014.

In 2019, for his services to Indian farming, he was conferred the Padma Shri award, India's fourth highest national honour which was given to 94 people in that year.
