= Agra West Assembly constituency =

Former constituency of the Uttar Pradesh legislative assembly in India

Coordinates: 27.19°N 77.93°E

Agra West
- Former constituency for the Uttar Pradesh Legislative Assembly

Constituency details
- Country: India
- Region: North India
- State: Uttar Pradesh
- District: Agra
- Established: 1967
- Abolished: 2008

Agra West Assembly constituency was a legislative assembly of Uttar Pradesh. As a consequence of the orders of the Delimitation Commission, Agra West Assembly constituency it ceased to exist from 2008.

== Member of Legislative Assembly ==
The Members of Legislative Assembly are given follows-

Year	Winner	Party	Ref.
1967	M. Singh	Republican Party of India	
1969	Hukam Singh	Bharatiya Lok Dal	
1974	Gulab Sehra	Indian National Congress	
1977	Gulab Sehra	Indian National Congress	
1980	Azad Kumar Kardam	Indian National Congress (I)	
1985	Virendra Son	Indian National Congress	
1989	Kishan Gopal	Bharatiya Janata Party	
1991	Kishan Gopal	Bharatiya Janata Party	
1993	Ram Babu Harit	Bharatiya Janata Party	
1996	Ram Babu Harit	Bharatiya Janata Party	
2002	Ram Babu Harit	Bharatiya Janata Party	
2007	Guteyari Lal Duves	Bahujan Samaj Party	
Delimitation:- After 2008, known as Agra South Assembly constituency
