= Narayan Singh Bhainsora =

Indian politician and social worker (1939–2020)

Member of Legislative assembly
- In office 1977–1980
- Preceded by: Gopal Dutt Ojha
- Succeeded by: Chauru Chandra Ojha
- Constituency: Didihaat

Personal details
- Born: 10 February 1939 Didihat, Pithoragarh, Uttarakhand
- Died: 17 June 2020 (aged 81) Pithoragarh, Uttarakhand
- Party: Bharatiya Janata Party
- Other political affiliations: Janata Party
- Education: M.A.

Narayan Singh Bhainsora (10 February 1939 – 17 June 2020) was an Indian politician and social worker who served as an MLA from Didihat Assembly constituency as a member of the Janata Party.

He was influenced by the ideologies of Vinobha Bhave and RSS as a child.

== Political career ==
- 1962–1967 – Gram Pradhan of baltir village
- 1967 – Elected to Didihat on Janata Party ticket
- 1989 – Unsuccessfully contested from Didihat from a BJP ticket.
- 1989 – Unsuccessfully contested from Didihat from a BJP ticket.
- 1991 – He quit the BJP and rejoined the Janata Party. He later rejoined the BJP
