= Kedar Singh Phonia =

Indian politician (1930–2022)

Minister of Tourism & Culture Minister of Youth Affairs & Sports Government of Uttar Pradesh
- In office 24 June 1991 – 6 December 1992
- Chief Minister: Kalyan Singh

Member of Uttarakhand Legislative Assembly
- In office 2007–2012
- Preceded by: Anusuya Prasad Maikhuri
- Succeeded by: Rajendra Singh Bhandari
- Constituency: Badrinath

Member of Uttar Pradesh Legislative Assembly
- In office 1991–2002
- Preceded by: Kunwar Singh Negi
- Succeeded by: constituency defunct
- Constituency: Badri-Kedar

Personal details
- Born: 6 October 1930 Joshimath, Chamoli district, Princely State of Tehri Garhwal, British Raj
- Died: 14 October 2022 (aged 92)
- Political party: Bharatiya Janata Party
- Spouse: Kamla Phonia (m. 1955)
- Children: 1 son, 3 daughters
- Parent: Madhav Singh Phonia (father)
- Education: M.A., Diploma (Tourism)
- Alma mater: Prague University

Kedar Singh Phonia (6 October 1930 – 14 October 2022) was an Indian politician and member of the Bharatiya Janata Party. Phonia was a member of the Uttarakhand Legislative Assembly from the Badrinath constituency in Chamoli district.

Phonia died on 14 October 2022, at the age of 92.
