= Agra Cantonment Assembly constituency =

Constituency of the Uttar Pradesh legislative assembly in India

Agra Cantonment
- Constituency No. 87 for the Uttar Pradesh Legislative Assembly

Constituency details
- Country: India
- Region: North India
- State: Uttar Pradesh
- District: Agra
- Established: 1967
- Total electors: 4,45,265 (2019)
- Reservation: SC

Member of Legislative Assembly
- 18th Uttar Pradesh Legislative Assembly
- Incumbent Girraj Singh Dharmesh
- Party: Bharatiya Janata Party

Agra Cantonment (a.k.a. Agra Cantt.) is one of the 403 constituencies of the Uttar Pradesh Legislative Assembly, India. It is a part of the Agra district and one of the five assembly constituencies in the Agra Lok Sabha constituency. First assembly elections in the Agra Cantonment assembly constituency were conducted in 1967, and the extant and serial number of this constituency was last defined in "Delimitation of Parliamentary and Assembly Constituencies Order, 2008". VVPAT facility with EVMs will arrive in the 2017 U.P assembly polls.

== Wards / Areas ==
Agra Cantt. assembly constituency comprises "Agra CB" and Ward numbers 2, 3, 6, 7, 13, 14, 16, 20, 21, 24, 34, 40, 46, 47, 50, 52, 53, 54, 60, 65 & 68 in Agra municipal corporation.

== Members of the Legislative Assembly ==
Election	Name	Party
1967	H.H.N.A.A.H. Babu	Indian National Congress
1969	Deoki Nandan Bibav	Indian National Congress
1974	Krishna Vir Singh Kaushal	Indian National Congress
1977	Krishna Vir Singh Kaushal	Indian National Congress
1980	Krishna Vir Singh Kaushal	Indian National Congress (Indira)
1985	Krishna Vir Singh Kaushal	Indian National Congress
1989	Hardwar Dubey	Bharatiya Janata Party
1991	Hardwar Dubey	Bharatiya Janata Party
1993	Ramesh Kant Lawania	Bharatiya Janata Party
1996	Kesho Mehra	Bharatiya Janata Party
2002	Mohammad Basheer	Bahujan Samaj Party
2007	Zulfikar Ahmed Bhutto	Bahujan Samaj Party
2012	Gutiyari Lal Duwesh	Bahujan Samaj Party
2017	Girraj Singh Dharmesh	Bharatiya Janata Party
2022	Girraj Singh Dharmesh	Bharatiya Janata Party

== Election results ==
=== 2027 ===
2027 Uttar Pradesh Legislative Assembly election: Agra Cantonment
Party	Candidate	Votes	%	±%
INDIA				
NDA				
BSP				
NOTA	None of the above			
Majority				
Turnout				
gain from		Swing		

=== 2022 ===
2022 Uttar Pradesh Legislative Assembly election: Agra Cantonment
Party	Candidate	Votes	%	±%
BJP	Girraj Singh Dharmesh	117,796	46.78	+2.01
SP	Kunwar Chand Vakil	69,099	27.44	+1.85
BSP	Bhartendra Arun	54,409	21.61	−4.83
INC	Sikandar Singh Valmiki	5,590	2.22	
NOTA	None of the above	1,420	0.56	+0.09
Majority		48,697	19.34	+1.01
Turnout		251,816	53.9	−5.23
BJP hold		Swing		

=== 2017 ===
2017 Uttar Pradesh Legislative Assembly election: Agra Cantonment
Party	Candidate	Votes	%	±%
BJP	Girraj Singh Dharmesh	113,178	44.77	
BSP	Gutiyari Lal Duwesh	66,853	26.44	
SP	Mamata Konan	64,683	25.59	
NOTA	None of the above	1,185	0.47	
Majority		46,325	18.33	
Turnout		252,816	59.13	
BJP gain from BSP		Swing	-	

=== 2012 ===
2012 Uttar Pradesh Legislative Assembly election: Agra Cantonment
Party	Candidate	Votes	%	±%
BSP	Gutiyari Lal Duwesh	67,786	32.47	−
BJP	Girraj Singh Dharmesh	61,371	29.40	−
SP	Chander Sen	44,684	21.89	−
	Remainder thirteen candidates	33,898	16.24	−
Majority		6,415	3.07	−
Turnout		208,739	54.44	−
BSP hold		Swing	-	

== See also ==
- Agra district
- Agra (Graduates constituency)
- Agra Lok Sabha constituency
- List of constituencies of the Uttar Pradesh Legislative Assembly
