= Govind Singh Kunjwal =

Indian politician

Speaker of Uttarakhand Legislative Assembly
- In office 26 March 2012 – 20 March 2017
- Preceded by: Harbans Kapoor
- Succeeded by: Premchand Aggarwal

Member of Uttarakhand Legislative Assembly
- In office 2002–2022
- Succeeded by: Mohan Singh Mahara
- Constituency: Jageshwar

Personal details
- Born: May 25, 1945 (age 81) Almora, Uttar Pradesh, India (Now Uttarakhand)
- Party: Indian National Congress

Govind Singh Kunjwal (born 25 May 1945) is an Indian National Congress leader and former member of the Uttarakhand Legislative Assembly in India. He was elected from the Jageshwar constituency in the 2002 election. He was former speaker of Uttarakhand Legislative Assembly.

He was heavily criticized for his role in Uttarakhand political trouble in 2016 where 9 MLAs from Indian National Congress changed their loyalty towards Bharatiya Janata Party.

== Electoral Performances ==
| Year | Election | Party | Constituency Name | Result | Votes gained | Vote share% | Margin |
|---|---|---|---|---|---|---|---|
| 1993 | 12th Uttar Pradesh Assembly | Indian National Congress | Almora | Won | 33,850 | | 6,490 |
| 1996 | 13th Uttar Pradesh Assembly | Indian National Congress | Almora | Lost | 25,010 | | 16,729 |
| 2002 | 1st Uttarakhand Assembly | Indian National Congress | Jageshwar | Won | | | |
| 2007 | 2nd Uttarakhand Assembly | Indian National Congress | Jageshwar | Won | | | |
| 2012 | 3rd Uttarakhand Assembly | Indian National Congress | Jageshwar | Won | | | |
| 2017 | 4th Uttarakhand Assembly | Indian National Congress | Jageshwar | Won | | | 399 |
| 2022 | 5th Uttarakhand Assembly | Indian National Congress | Jageshwar | Lost | | | |
