= Kailash Sharma =

Indian politician

Kailash Sharma is an Indian politician and member of the Bharatiya Janata Party. Sharma was a member of the Uttarakhand Legislative Assembly from the Almora constituency in Almora district.
