= Manzoor Ahmad (politician) =

Indian politician

- मंज़ूर अहमद
- In office 2nd Dec 1989 – 4th Apr 1991

10th Legislative Assembly of Uttar Pradesh
- In office 4th Dec 1993 – 28th Oct 1995

12th Legislative Assembly of Uttar Pradesh

Personal details
- Born: 28 November 1938 Baheri, Bareilly
- Died: 6 March 2002 (aged 63)
- Party: Samajwadi Party

Manzoor Ahmad (28 November 1938 – 6 March 2002) was a prominent Indian politician, co-founder and senior leader of Samajwadi Party, Chairman of Uttar Pradesh Waqf Board, and former member of Uttar Pradesh Jal Purchasing Committee, and of Uttar Pradesh Assembly Parliament Committee. He had been a member of the 10th Legislative Assembly of Uttar Pradesh as an Independent MLA, and of the 12th and 14th Legislative Assembly of Uttar Pradesh as a member of the Samajwadi Party representing the Baheri Assembly constituency.

== Murder ==
On 6 March 2002, Manzoor Ahmad was shot and killed near the Raj Bhavan in Lucknow. The incident occurred during a gathering of Samajwadi Party (SP) members who were attempting to submit a memorandum to the then Governor, Vishnu Kant Shastri.

Following the shooting, police, Provincial Armed Constabulary (PAC) and Rapid Action Force (RAF) personnel were deployed in the area. According to then ASP City Rajesh Pandey, officers reached the spot and found a man wearing a white kurta pajama lying face down with a gunshot wound on his back. The assailant was reportedly seen fleeing a short distance away and was apprehended after a brief pursuit.

Police recovered a bag from the detained suspect containing a pistol with an exit hole consistent with a shot fired from inside the bag. The victim was soon identified as MLA Manzoor Ahmad. Tensions escalated when some SP members attempted to assault the suspect while he was in police custody; officers intervened and transferred him to the Hazratganj police station. Ahmad was taken to the Civil Hospital, where he was declared dead.

In September 2003, the Allahabad High Court ordered a Central Bureau of Investigation (CBI) probe into the killing.
