= 1967 Uttar Pradesh Legislative Assembly election =

- February 21, 1967

425 seats in the Uttar Pradesh Legislative Assembly 213 seats needed for a majority
- Registered: 42,148,100
- Turnout: 22,989,751 (54.55%) ▲3.11%
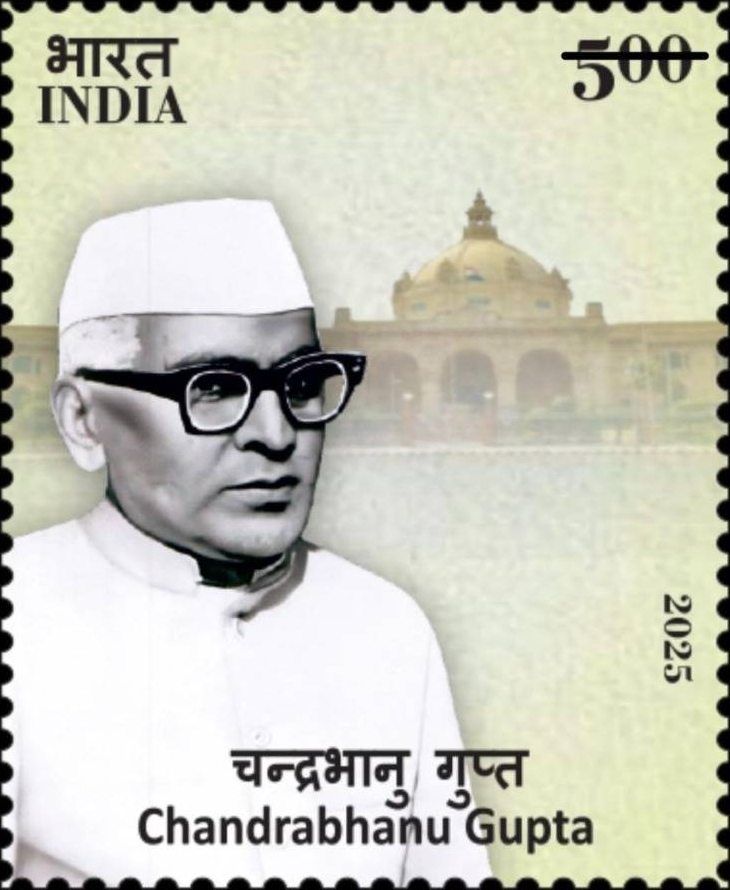

	Majority party	Minority party	Third party
			SSP
Leader	Chandra Bhanu Gupta
Party	INC	ABJS	SSP
Leader's seat	Ranikhet
Last election	249 seats, 36.33%	49 seats, 16.46%	24 seats, 8.21%
Seats won	199	98	44
Seat change	▼50	▲49	▲44
Popular vote	6,912,104	4,651,738	2,140,924
Percentage	32.20%	21.67%	9.97%
Swing	▼4.13%	▲5.21%	▲7.41%
Chief Minister before election
Chandra Bhanu Gupta
INC
Elected Chief Minister
Charan Singh
SVD

1967 Fourth general elections held in Uttar Pradesh. The Indian National Congress won the most seats as well as the largest share of the popular vote. But it could not secure enough seats for a majority and so a coalition of other parties formed the government with Charan Singh as the Chief Minister of Uttar Pradesh.

== Election results ==
Party	Votes	%	+/–	Seats	+/–
Indian National Congress	6,912,104	32.20	▼4.13%	199	▼50
Bharatiya Jana Sangh	4,651,738	21.67	▲5.21%	98	▲49
Samyukta Socialist Party	2,140,924	9.97	▲7.41%	44	▲20
Communist Party of India	692,942	3.23	▼1.85%	13	▼1
Swatantra Party	1,016,284	4.73	▲0.13%	12	▼3
Praja Socialist Party	878,738	4.09	▼7.43%	11	▼27
Republican Party of India	889,010	4.14	▲0.40%	10	▲2
Communist Party of India (Marxist)	272,565	1.27	new party	1	new party
Independents	4,013,661	18.70	▲5.99%	37	▲6
Total	21,467,966	100.00	–	425	▼5
Valid votes	21,467,966	93.38			
Invalid/blank votes	1,521,785	6.62			
Total votes	22,989,751	100.00			
Registered voters/turnout	42,148,100	54.55			

The Samyukta Vidhayak Dal (SVD) government was formed by the Bharatiya Jana Sangh (98 MLAs), Samyukta Socialist Party (44 MLAs), 21 MLAs from the Congress, Communist Party of India (13 MLAs), Swatantra Party (12 MLAs), Praja Socialist Party (11 MLAs), Republican Party of India (10 MLAs), Communist Party of India (Marxist) (1 MLA) and 22 Independent MLAs. SVD's total strength was 232 in the 425-member Uttar Pradesh Legislative Assembly and Charan Singh (leader of a faction that broke away from the Congress) became the Chief Minister of Uttar Pradesh.

== Elected members ==
Constituency	Reserved for (SC/ST/None)	Member	Party
Uttar Kashi	None	Krishna Singh	Indian National Congress
Tehri	None	T. Singh	Indian National Congress
Deoprayag	None	I. Mani	Independent
Lansdowne	None	B. D. Dhuliya	Swatantra Party
Ekeshwar	None	R. Prasad	Independent
Pauri	None	C. S. Rawat	Indian National Congress
Karanprayag	None	Y. Prasad	Indian National Congress
Badri Kedar	None	G. Dhar	Indian National Congress
Didihat	None	Gopal Dutt Ojha	Indian National Congress
Pithoragarh	None	Narendra Singh Bisht	Indian National Congress
Almora	None	R. Chandra	Bharatiya Jana Sangh
Bageshwar	SC	G. R. Dass	Indian National Congress
Dwarahat	None	H. D. Kardpal	Indian National Congress
Ranikhet	None	C. B. Gupta	Indian National Congress
Nainital	None	P. Singh	Praja Socialist Party
Haldwani	SC	I. Lal	Indian National Congress
Kashipur	None	R. Datt	Praja Socialist Party
Noorpur	None	K. Singh	Indian National Congress
Dhampur	None	G. Sahai	Indian National Congress
Afzalgarh	SC	C. G. Lal	Indian National Congress
Nagina	None	A. Rehman	Indian National Congress
Najibabad	None	K. D. Singh	Independent
Bijnor	None	K. S. Vir	Indian National Congress
Chandpur	None	N. Singh	Independent
Kanth	None	J. Singh	Independent
Amroha	None	S. Husain	Communist Party of India
Hasanpur	None	R. Uddin	Indian National Congress
Gangeshwari	SC	S. Lal	Indian National Congress
Sambhal	None	M. Kumar	Bharatiya Jana Sangh
Bahjoi	None	B.lal	Indian National Congress
Chandausi	None	I. Mohani	Indian National Congress
Kunderki	SC	M. Lal	Independent
Moradabad City	None	O. Saran	Indian National Congress
Moradabad Rural	None	K. Singh	Indian National Congress
Thakurdwara	None	A. Khan	Swatantra Party
Suar Tanda	None	M. Husain	Swatantra Party
Rampur	None	A. A. Khan	Swatantra Party
Bilaspur	None	M. Lal	Swatantra Party
Shahabad	SC	B. Dhar	Swatantra Party
Bisauli	None	S. Singh	Bharatiya Jana Sangh
Gunnaur	None	J. Kishore	Indian National Congress
Sahaswan	None	A. Lal	Bharatiya Jana Sangh
Ambiapur	SC	S. Lal	Bharatiya Jana Sangh
Budaun	None	M. A. Ahmad	Republican Party of India
Usehat	None	B. P. Singh	Bharatiya Jana Sangh
Dataganj	None	H. C. Singh	Independent
Binawar	None	G. S. Rathaur	Indian National Congress
Aonla	SC	D. Prakash	Bharatiya Jana Sangh
Alampur	None	N. Kishore	Indian National Congress
Faridpur	None	D. P. Singh	Indian National Congress
Nawabganj	None	C. R. Pachpra	Bharatiya Jana Sangh
Bareilly City	None	J. S. Agarwala	Indian National Congress
Bareilly Cantonment	None	R. Ballabh	Bharatiya Jana Sangh
Bhojipura	None	H. K. Gangwar	Bharatiya Jana Sangh
Shergarh	None	M. P. Singh	Bharatiya Jana Sangh
Baheri	None	R. Murti	Indian National Congress
Pilibhit	None	B. Ram	Bharatiya Jana Sangh
Barkhera	SC	K. Lal	Bharatiya Jana Sangh
Bisalpur	None	M. P. Singh	Praja Socialist Party
Puranpur	None	M. L. Acharya	Indian National Congress
Powayan	SC	K. Lal	Indian National Congress
Nigohi	None	R. Nath	Praja Socialist Party
Tilhar	None	S.vikram	Indian National Congress
Jalalabad	None	D. Singh	Bharatiya Jana Sangh
Dadraul	None	R. M. Anchal	Indian National Congress
Shahjahanpur	None	M. R. Khan	Indian National Congress
Mohamdi	SC	M. Lal	Bharatiya Jana Sangh
Haiderabad	None	R. Rajeshwar	Bharatiya Jana Sangh
Lakhimpur	None	C. R. Verma	Bharatiya Jana Sangh
Bankeyganj	SC	D. Prasad	Bharatiya Jana Sangh
Phoolbeher	None	B. Misra	Indian National Congress
Nighasan	None	K. Singh	Indian National Congress
Dhaurehra	None	J. Prasad	Praja Socialist Party
Behta	None	G. S. Bhatnagar	Indian National Congress
Biswan	None	G. P. Mehrotra	Bharatiya Jana Sangh
Mahmudabad	None	B. Prasad	Samyukta Socialist Party
Sidhauli	SC	M. Din	Bharatiya Jana Sangh
Sitapur	None	T. Prasad	Bharatiya Jana Sangh
Laharpur	None	V. Behari	Bharatiya Jana Sangh
Hargaon	SC	S. Ram	Bharatiya Jana Sangh
Misrikh	None	R. Bahadur	Indian National Congress
Machhrehta	SC	J. Lal	Bharatiya Jana Sangh
Beniganj	SC	A. Lal	Bharatiya Jana Sangh
Sandila	None	K. Nath	Bharatiya Jana Sangh
Ahirori	SC	M. Lal	Indian National Congress
Hardoi	None	D. Singh	Independent
Bawan	None	G. B. Singh	Bharatiya Jana Sangh
Pihani	SC	K. L. Balmiki	Indian National Congress
Shahabad	None	R. H. B. Singh	Indian National Congress
Bilgram	None	Kala Rani	Indian National Congress
Mallawan	None	L. Sharma	Independent
Bangarmau	None	S. Gopal	Bharatiya Jana Sangh
Unnao	None	Z. Rahaman	Indian National Congress
Bichhia	None	R. A. Singh	Indian National Congress
Bhagwantnagar	None	B. S. Visharad	Praja Socialist Party
Purwa	SC	Lakhan	Bharatiya Jana Sangh
Hasanganj	None	S. Ram	Indian National Congress
Miyanganj	SC	B. Lal	Communist Party of India
Malihabad	SC	B. Lal	Indian National Congress
Mahona	None	R. P. Trivedi	Indian National Congress
Lucknow East	None	R. S. Kapoor	Bharatiya Jana Sangh
Lucknow Central	None	S. K. Vidyarthi	Bharatiya Jana Sangh
Lucknow West	None	S. Sharma	Bharatiya Jana Sangh
Lucknow Cantonment	None	B. P. Awasthi	Independent
Sarojini Nagar	None	V. Kumar	Indian National Congress
Mohanlalganj	SC	N. Dass	Indian National Congress
Bachhrawan	SC	R. Dularey	Indian National Congress
Tiloi	None	W. Naqvi	Indian National Congress
Rae Bareli	None	M. M. Misra	Indian National Congress
Sataon	None	R. P. Singh	Indian National Congress
Sareni	None	G. Singh	Indian National Congress
Dalmau	None	S. S. Singh	Indian National Congress
Salon	None	D. B. Singh	Indian National Congress
Rokha	SC	R. Prasad	Indian National Congress
Kunda	None	N. Hasan	Indian National Congress
Bihar	SC	R. Swarup	Indian National Congress
Rampur Khas	None	R. Ajore	Indian National Congress
Lachmanpur	None	R. N. Shukla	Indian National Congress
Pratapgarh	None	A. Pratap	Indian National Congress
Birapur	None	R. Deo	Samyukta Socialist Party
Patti	SC	R. Kinkar	Indian National Congress
Amethi	None	R. P. Singh	Bharatiya Jana Sangh
Gauriganj	None	G. Singh	Independent
Jagdishpur	SC	R. Sewak	Bharatiya Jana Sangh
Issauli	None	R. B. Mishra	Indian National Congress
Jaisinghpur	None	S. Misra	Indian National Congress
Sultanpur	None	R. P. Shukla	Bharatiya Jana Sangh
Lambhua	None	U. Datt	Indian National Congress
Kadipur	SC	Sukhdeo	Indian National Congress
Katehri	None	R. Narain	Indian National Congress
Akbarpur	None	J. R. Verma	Indian National Congress
Jalalpur	None	J. Prasad	Independent
Jahangirganj	SC	B. Ram	Samyukta Socialist Party
Tanda	None	R. C. Azad	Indian National Congress
Maya	None	Rajbali	Communist Party of India
Ayodhya	None	B. Kishore	Bharatiya Jana Sangh
Bikapur	None	R. B. Dewedi	Indian National Congress
Milkipur	None	R. Lal	Indian National Congress
Sohawal	SC	J. Prasad	Indian National Congress
Rudauli	None	C. Kumar	Independent
Daryabad	None	G. Shanker	Indian National Congress
Siddhaur	SC	G. Das	Indian National Congress
Haidergarh	None	J. Bahadur	Samyukta Socialist Party
Masauli	None	J. Rahman	Indian National Congress
Nawabganj	None	A. Ram	Samyukta Socialist Party
Fatehpur	SC	N. Lal	Samyukta Socialist Party
Ramnagar	None	R. Asrey	Samyukta Socialist Party
Kaisarganj	None	D. Singh	Bharatiya Jana Sangh
Fakharpur	None	K. R. J. B. Rana	Bharatiya Jana Sangh
Mahsi	None	G. Prasad	Bharatiya Jana Sangh
Sheopur	None	R. A. S. Sengar	Bharatiya Jana Sangh
Nanpara	None	K. Lal	Bharatiya Jana Sangh
Charda	SC	Gajadhar	Bharatiya Jana Sangh
Bhinga	None	K. Prasad	Bharatiya Jana Sangh
Bahraich	None	K. B. Misra	Bharatiya Jana Sangh
Ikauna	SC	Bhagwati	Bharatiya Jana Sangh
Tulsipur	SC	S. Prasad	Bharatiya Jana Sangh
Gainsari	None	S. B. Singh	Bharatiya Jana Sangh
Bairampur	None	P. N. Tewari	Bharatiya Jana Sangh
Utraula	None	R. M. Khan	Indian National Congress
Sadullanagar	None	V. P. Singh	Indian National Congress
Mankapur	None	Kunwar Anand Singh	Indian National Congress
Mujehna	None	R. Dularey	Bharatiya Jana Sangh
Gonda	None	I. Saran	Indian National Congress
Katrabazar	None	R. Deo	Bharatiya Jana Sangh
Colonelganj	None	M. M. Singh	Independent
Tarabganj	None	S. P. Singh	Indian National Congress
Mahadeva	SC	B. Lal	Swatantra Party
Bikramjot	None	R. Kishore	Swatantra Party
Harraiya	SC	B. Ram	Bharatiya Jana Sangh
Bahadurpur	None	R. L. Singh	Indian National Congress
Basti	None	L. K. K. Pal	Swatantra Party
Saonghat	SC	S. L. Dhusiya	Indian National Congress
Domariaganj	None	J. D. Singh	Bharatiya Jana Sangh
Bhanwapur	None	J. Nand	Bharatiya Jana Sangh
Banganga	None	M. Singh	Bharatiya Jana Sangh
Naugarh	None	D. Yadava	Bharatiya Jana Sangh
Bansi	None	P. Dayal	Indian National Congress
Khesraha	None	R.b. Chand	Indian National Congress
Rudhauli	None	A. M. Khan	Indian National Congress
Menhdawal	None	C. S. Singh	Bharatiya Jana Sangh
Khalilabad	None	D. D. Pande	Indian National Congress
Hainsarbazar	SC	Santoo	Bharatiya Jana Sangh
Bansgaon	None	J. Singh	Samyukta Socialist Party
Dhuriapar	SC	Y. Devi	Indian National Congress
Chillupar	None	K. N. Singh	Indian National Congress
Kauriaram	None	A. Kumar	Samyukta Socialist Party
Jhangha	SC	R. Pati	Samyukta Socialist Party
Pipraich	None	M. Dighe	Samyukta Socialist Party
Gorakhpur	None	U. Pratap	Bharatiya Jana Sangh
Maniram	None	A. Nath	Independent
Sahjanwan	None	R. Karan	Praja Socialist Party
Paniara	None	B. Bahadur	Indian National Congress
Pharenda	None	G. Ram	Independent
Lakshmipur	None	Raghuraj	Bharatiya Jana Sangh
Siswa	None	Y. Singh	Indian National Congress
Mahrajganj	SC	Duryodhan	Indian National Congress
Shyam Deowra	None	B. Chaturvedi	Indian National Congress
Naurangia	SC	Dasharath	Indian National Congress
Ramkola	None	Rajdeo	Indian National Congress
Hata	None	R. Ram	Indian National Congress
Padrauna	None	Chandradeo	Indian National Congress
Seorahi	None	G. Singh	Indian National Congress
Fazilnagar	None	R. Rai	Indian National Congress
Kushinagar	None	R. Naresh	Samyukta Socialist Party
Gauri Bazar	None	C. Bali	Independent
Rudrapur	SC	Dr. S. Ram	Indian National Congress
Deoria	None	F. Chishti	Indian National Congress
Bhatpar Rani	None	A. Pd. Arya	Indian National Congress
Salempur	None	A. P. Mal	Indian National Congress
Barhaj	None	U. Sen	Samyukta Socialist Party
Nathupur	SC	M. Deo	Samyukta Socialist Party
Ghosi	None	Jharkhande	Communist Party of India
Sagri	None	Narbdeshwar	Communist Party of India
Gopalpur	None	M. N. Rai	Indian National Congress
Azamgarh	None	B. Prasad	Samyukta Socialist Party
Rani Ka Sarai	None	J. N. Misra	Samyukta Socialist Party
Atraulia	None	Markande	Samyukta Socialist Party
Phulpur	None	R. Bachan	Indian National Congress
Martinganj	SC	Arjun	Indian National Congress
Mehnagar	SC	Jainu	Bharatiya Jana Sangh
Lalganj	None	Tribeni	Indian National Congress
Mubarakpur	None	Vishwanath	Indian National Congress
Mohammadabad Gohna	SC	S. Nath	Indian National Congress
Mau	None	B. M. D. Agrawal	Bharatiya Jana Sangh
Rasra	SC	R. Ratan	Indian National Congress
Siar	None	Shivalal	Samyukta Socialist Party
Chilkahar	None	Kamta	Communist Party of India
Sikandarpur	None	R. Ram	Independent
Bansdih	None	Baijnath	Bharatiya Jana Sangh
Duaba	None	S. M. Singh	Indian National Congress
Ballia	None	R. Singh	Bharatiya Jana Sangh
Kopachit	None	S. Tiwari	Indian National Congress
Qasimabad	None	Raghubir	Republican Party of India
Mohammadabad	None	V. S. Singh	Indian National Congress
Dildarnagar	None	K . N . Rai	Indian National Congress
Zamania	None	R . S . Shastri	Communist Party of India
Ghazipur	None	P . Ram	Communist Party of India
Jakhania	SC	D . Ram	Indian National Congress
Sadat	None	Rajnath	Indian National Congress
Saidpur	None	Atma	Indian National Congress
Dhanapur	None	Baijnath	Samyukta Socialist Party
Chandauli	None	C . Shekhar	Samyukta Socialist Party
Chakia	SC	B . Ram	Samyukta Socialist Party
Mughalsarai	None	S . L . Yadava	Indian National Congress
Varanasi Cantonment	None	V . Pandey	Bharatiya Jana Sangh
Varanasi North	None	V . Prasad	Bharatiya Jana Sangh
Varanasi South	None	R.satin	Communist Party of India
Araziline	None	B.ram	Samyukta Socialist Party
Chiraigaon	None	H.bahadur	Indian National Congress
Kolaslah	None	Udal	Communist Party of India
Aurai	None	N.singh	Indian National Congress
Gyanpur	None	Muralidhar	Bharatiya Jana Sangh
Bhadohi	SC	H.ram	Indian National Congress
Barsathi	None	K.prasad	Indian National Congress
Mariahu	None	R.kishore	Indian National Congress
Kerakat	SC	R.samjhawan	Indian National Congress
Beyalsi	None	L.bahahur	Indian National Congress
Jaunpur	None	K.pati	Indian National Congress
Rari	None	R.bahadur	Independent
Shahganj	SC	M.prasad	Indian National Congress
Khutahan	None	L.shankar	Indian National Congress
Garwara	None	D.sewak	Bharatiya Jana Sangh
Machhlishahar	None	M.rauf	Indian National Congress
Dudhi	SC	A.prasad	Bharatiya Jana Sangh
Robertsganj	SC	R.narain	Indian National Congress
Rajgarh	None	Ramnath	Indian National Congress
Chunar	None	R.n.singh	Indian National Congress
Majhwa	SC	B.ram	Indian National Congress
Mirzapur	None	A.kumar	Samyukta Socialist Party
Chhanvey	None	S.brahmashram	Bharatiya Jana Sangh
Meja	SC	B.vir	Indian National Congress
Karchana	None	S.deen	Independent
Bara	None	H.n.bahuguna	Indian National Congress
Bahadurpur	None	R.nath	Samyukta Socialist Party
Handia	None	A.ram	Independent
Pratappur	None	M.hasan	Indian National Congress
Soraon	None	R.d.patel	Samyukta Socialist Party
Kaurihar	None	S.n.singh	Indian National Congress
Allahabad North	None	R.k.bajpai	Indian National Congress
Allahabad South	None	K.c.mohiley	Samyukta Socialist Party
Allahabad West	None	C.n.singh	Indian National Congress
Chail	SC	D.lal	Indian National Congress
Majhanpur	SC	N.r.shikshak	Bharatiya Jana Sangh
Sirathu	None	M.p.tewari	Indian National Congress
Khaga	None	C.kishore	Republican Party of India
Kishanpur	SC	B.prasad	Indian National Congress
Haswa	None	J.n. Singh	Indian National Congress
Fatehpur	None	S.hasan	Indian National Congress
Khajuha	None	P.datt	Indian National Congress
Bindki	None	R.kant	Indian National Congress
Aryanagar	SC	J.jatav	Indian National Congress
Chamanganj	None	B.badre	Samyukta Socialist Party
Generalganj	None	G.ram	Bharatiya Jana Sangh
Kanpur Cantonment	None	D.s. Bajpai	Indian National Congress
Govindnagar	None	P.tripathi	Indian National Congress
Kalyanpur	None	S.g.datta	Indian National Congress
Sarsaul	None	S.b.singh	Praja Socialist Party
Ghatampur	None	B. Singh	Indian National Congress
Bhoganipur	SC	K. Lal	Samyukta Socialist Party
Rajpur	None	R.s. Verma	Samyukta Socialist Party
Sarvankhera	None	R.n.singh	Indian National Congress
Chaubepur	None	R.kumar	Independent
Bilhaur	SC	M.l.dehalvi	Samyukta Socialist Party
Derapur	None	N.pandey	Indian National Congress
Auraiya	None	C.b.singh	Samyukta Socialist Party
Ajitmal	SC	D.r.charan	Samyukta Socialist Party
Lakhana	SC	K.lal	Samyukta Socialist Party
Etawah	None	B.bhushan	Bharatiya Jana Sangh
Jaswantnagar	None	Mulayam Singh Yadav	Samyukta Socialist Party
Bidhuna	None	Ramadhar	Samyukta Socialist Party
Bharthana	None	S.singh	Samyukta Socialist Party
Kannauj	SC	P.ram	Indian National Congress
Umardha	None	H.l.yadav	Samyukta Socialist Party
Chhibramau	None	R.p.tripathi	Bharatiya Jana Sangh
Kamalganj	None	B.singh	Bharatiya Jana Sangh
Farukhabad	None	M.singh	Indian National Congress
Kaimganj	None	G.c.tewari	Bharatiya Jana Sangh
Mohammadabad	None	R.s.yadav	Indian National Congress
Manikpur	SC	Indrapal	Bharatiya Jana Sangh
Karwi	None	R.sajiwan	Communist Party of India
Baberu	None	D.singh	Indian National Congress
Naraini	None	J.singh	Bharatiya Jana Sangh
Banda	None	G.s.saraf	Bharatiya Jana Sangh
Hamirpur	None	B.b.brahmachari	Bharatiya Jana Sangh
Maudaha	None	B.singh	Bharatiya Jana Sangh
Rath	None	R.s.rajpur	Bharatiya Jana Sangh
Charkhari	None	J.singh	Independent
Mahoba	SC	Zorawar	Bharatiya Jana Sangh
Mehroni	None	R.singh	Bharatiya Jana Sangh
Lalitpur	SC	A.prasad	Indian National Congress
Jhansi	None	U.narayan	Indian National Congress
Babina	None	S.p.goswami	Indian National Congress
Mauranipur	SC	B.bai	Indian National Congress
Gardutha	None	K.lal	Bharatiya Jana Sangh
Konch	SC	B.lal	Indian National Congress
Orai	None	C.sharma	Indian National Congress
Kalpi	None	C.s.singh	Bharatiya Jana Sangh
Madhogarh	None	G.narain	Indian National Congress
Bhongaon	None	J.n.tripathi	Communist Party of India
Kishni	None	S.r.singh	Samyukta Socialist Party
Karhal	SC	M.l.chamar	Swatantra Party
Shikohabad	None	R.swarup	Indian National Congress
Jasrana	None	R.s.verma	Indian National Congress
Ghiror	None	R.singh	Swatantra Party
Mainpuri	None	M.singh	Bharatiya Jana Sangh
Aliganj	None	L.singh	Indian National Congress
Paatiali	None	T.singh	Indian National Congress
Sakit	None	B.singh	Republican Party of India
Soron	SC	S.ram	Bharatiya Jana Sangh
Kasganj	None	K.charan	Indian National Congress
Etah	None	G.prasad	Swatantra Party
Nidhauli Klan	None	R.singh	Indian National Congress
Jalesar	SC	U.b.singh	Indian National Congress
Firozabad	None	R.ram	Independent
Bah	SC	R.das	Bharatiya Jana Sangh
Fatehabad	None	H.singh	Samyukta Socialist Party
Tundla	None	M.singh	Samyukta Socialist Party
Dayalbagh	SC	R.prasad	Indian National Congress
Agra Cantonment	None	H.h.n.a.a.h.babu	Indian National Congress
Agra East	None	R.s.agrawal	Bharatiya Jana Sangh
Agra West	None	M.singh	Republican Party of India
Kheragarh	None	J.p.rawat	Indian National Congress
Fatehpur Sikri	None	R.singh	Bharatiya Jana Sangh
Goverdhan	SC	Khem	Independent
Mathura	None	A.d.chjaran	Independent
Chhata	None	T.singh	Bharatiya Jana Sangh
Mat	None	A.l.raman	Indian National Congress
Gokul	None	G.prasad	Indian National Congress
Sadabad	None	A.a.khan	Indian National Congress
Hathras	None	R.s.singh	Bharatiya Jana Sangh
Sasni	SC	R.p. Deshmukh	Indian National Congress
Sikandra Rao	None	N.r. Sharma	Independent
Gangiri	None	B.singh	Praja Socialist Party
Atrauli	None	K.singh	Bharatiya Jana Sangh
Aligarh	None	I.p.singh	Bharatiya Jana Sangh
Koil	SC	K.l.diler	Bharatiya Jana Sangh
Iglas	None	M.l.gautam	Indian National Congress
Khair	None	P.lal	Indian National Congress
Chandaus	None	K.deo	Independent
Jewar	SC	H.singh	Praja Socialist Party
Khurja	None	B.dass	Indian National Congress
Chhatari	SC	D.singh	Indian National Congress
Debai	None	H.singh	Bharatiya Jana Sangh
Anupshahr	None	D.kumar	Bharatiya Jana Sangh
Siana	None	N.singh	Praja Socialist Party
Agota	None	J.singh	Republican Party of India
Bulandshahr	None	S.alam	Republican Party of India
Sikandrabad	None	R.c.vikal	Independent
Dadri	None	T.singh	Indian National Congress
Ghaziabad	None	P.lal	Republican Party of India
Muradnagar	None	G.s.chaudhri	Independent
Modinagar	None	S.prasad	Republican Party of India
Hapur	SC	D.d.sain	Republican Party of India
Garhmukteshwar	None	B.singh	Independent
Kithore	None	M.ahamd	Samyukta Socialist Party
Hastinapur	SC	R.l.sahayak	Indian National Congress
Sardhana	None	D.v.singh	Independent
Barnawa	None	J.singh	Independent
Meerut	None	M.l.kappor	Bharatiya Jana Sangh
Meerut Cantonment	None	V.tyagi	Samyukta Socialist Party
Rohta	SC	H.singh	Indian National Congress
Khekhra	None	P.singh	Indian National Congress
Baraut	None	A.dipanker	Communist Party of India
Chaprauli	None	C.singh	Indian National Congress
Kandhla	None	V.verma	Indian National Congress
Khatauli	None	S.singh	Communist Party of India
Jansath	SC	S.c.mazdoor	Indian National Congress
Morna	None	R.dutt	Indian National Congress
Muzaffarnagar	None	V.swarup	Independent
Charthawal	SC	H.chandra	Samyukta Socialist Party
Kairana	None	S.jang	Indian National Congress
Bhawan	None	R.c.singh	Indian National Congress
Nakur	None	N.singh	Independent
Sarsawa	None	M.m.a.khan	Indian National Congress
Nagal	SC	R.singh	Indian National Congress
Deoband	None	P.singh	Indian National Congress
Harora	SC	Shakuntala	Indian National Congress
Saharanpur	None	A.khaliq	Indian National Congress
Muzaffarabad	None	M.raj	Samyukta Socialist Party
Roorkee	None	J.n.sinha	Indian National Congress
Lhaksar	None	S.ahmad	Indian National Congress
Hardwar	None	M.g.giri	Independent
Dehra Dun	None	R.swarup	Independent
Mussoorie	None	G.singh	Indian National Congress
