= List of Lok Sabha members from Uttarakhand =

The Lok Sabha (meaning "House of the People") is the lower house of the Parliament of India. Uttarakhand state elects five members, and they are directly elected by the state electorates of Uttarakhand. Members are elected for five years by first-past-the-post voting. The number of seats allocated to the state or union territory is determined by the population of the state or union territory.

== Current members ==
Keys: BJP (5)
Source: Parliament of India (Lok Sabha)

No.	Current member	Party	Constituency		Current house	Election
No.	Current member	Party	Name	Reserved for (SC/ST/None)	Current house	Election
1	Mala Rajya Laxmi Shah	Bharatiya Janata Party	Tehri Garhwal	None	18th Lok Sabha	2024
2	Anil Baluni	Bharatiya Janata Party	Garhwal	None	18th Lok Sabha	2024
3	Ajay Tamta	Bharatiya Janata Party	Almora	SC	18th Lok Sabha	2024
4	Ajay Bhatt	Bharatiya Janata Party	Nainital–Udhamsingh Nagar	None	18th Lok Sabha	2024
5	Trivendra Singh Rawat	Bharatiya Janata Party	Haridwar	None	18th Lok Sabha	2024

== List of all Lok Sabha members from Uttarakhand ==
This is the list of all Lok Sabha members from Uttarakhand in chronological order.
Keys: BJP INC BSP
Source: Parliament of India (Lok Sabha)

No.	Name	Portrait	Party	Term	Tenure			Constituency		House	Election	Notes
No.	Name	Portrait	Party	Term	From	To	Total	Name	Reserved for (SC/ST/None)	House	Election	Notes
1	Bachi Singh Rawat		Bharatiya Janata Party	2	10 October 1999	16 May 2004	9 years, 215 days	Almora	None	13th Lok Sabha	1999	Elected as the Lok Sabha member from Uttar Pradesh. Continued the term as the Lok Sabha member from Uttarakhand onwards 9 November 2000.
1	Bachi Singh Rawat		Bharatiya Janata Party	2	16 May 2004	13 May 2009	9 years, 215 days	Almora	None	14th Lok Sabha	2004	
2	Bhuwan Chandra Khanduri		Bharatiya Janata Party	3	10 October 1999	16 May 2004	12 years 330 days	Garhwal	None	13th Lok Sabha	1999	Elected as the Lok Sabha member from Uttar Pradesh. Continued the term as the Lok Sabha member from Uttarakhand onwards 9 November 2000.
2	Bhuwan Chandra Khanduri		Bharatiya Janata Party	3	16 May 2004	29 August 2007	12 years 330 days	Garhwal	None	14th Lok Sabha	2004	Resigned due to his election to the 2nd Uttarakhand Assembly.
2	Bhuwan Chandra Khanduri		Bharatiya Janata Party	3	16 May 2014	23 May 2019	12 years 330 days	Garhwal	None	16th Lok Sabha	2014	
3	Harpal Singh Sathi		Bharatiya Janata Party	1	10 October 1999	16 May 2004	4 years, 219 days	Haridwar	SC	13th Lok Sabha	1999	Elected as the Lok Sabha members from Uttar Pradesh. Continued the term as the Lok Sabha members from Uttarakhand onwards 9 November 2000.
4	Manabendra Shah		Bharatiya Janata Party	2	10 October 1999	16 May 2004	7 years, 87 days	Tehri Garhwal	None	13th Lok Sabha	1999	Elected as the Lok Sabha members from Uttar Pradesh. Continued the term as the Lok Sabha members from Uttarakhand onwards 9 November 2000.
4	Manabendra Shah		Bharatiya Janata Party	2	16 May 2004	5 January 2007	7 years, 87 days	Tehri Garhwal	None	14th Lok Sabha	2004	Died in office 5 January 2007.
5	Narayan Datt Tiwari		Indian National Congress	1	10 October 1999	8 August 2002	2 years, 302 days	Nainital	None	13th Lok Sabha	1999	Elected as the Lok Sabha member from Uttar Pradesh. Continued the term as the Lok Sabha member from Uttarakhand onwards 9 November 2000. Resigned due to his election to the 1st Uttarakhand Assembly.
6	Mahendra Singh Pal		Indian National Congress	1	2002	16 May 2004	1 years ? days	Nainital	None	13th Lok Sabha	2002	Elected in the By-election.
7	Karan Chand Singh Baba		Indian National Congress	2	16 May 2004	13 May 2009	10 years, 0 days	Nainital	None	14th Lok Sabha	2004	
7	Karan Chand Singh Baba		Indian National Congress	2	13 May 2009	16 May 2014	10 years, 0 days	Nainital–Udhamsingh Nagar	None	15th Lok Sabha	2009	
8	Rajendra Kumar Badi		Samajwadi Party	1	16 May 2004	13 May 2009	4 years, 362 days	Haridwar	SC	14th Lok Sabha	2004	
9	Vijay Bahuguna		Indian National Congress	2	27 February 2007	13 May 2009	5 years, 132 days	Tehri Garhwal	None	14th Lok Sabha	2007	Elected in the By-election.
9	Vijay Bahuguna		Indian National Congress	2	13 May 2009	8 July 2012	5 years, 132 days	Tehri Garhwal	None	15th Lok Sabha	2009	Resigned due to his election to the 3rd Uttarakhand Assembly.
10	Tejpal Singh Rawat		Bharatiya Janata Party	1	2008	13 May 2009	1 year ? days	Garhwal	None	14th Lok Sabha	2008	Elected in the By-election.
11	Harish Rawat		Indian National Congress	1	13 May 2009	16 May 2014	5 years, 3 days	Haridwar	None	15th Lok Sabha	2009	
12	Pradeep Tamta		Indian National Congress	1	13 May 2009	16 May 2014	5 years, 3 days	Almora	SC	15th Lok Sabha	2009	
13	Satpal Maharaj		Indian National Congress	1	13 May 2009	16 May 2014	5 years, 3 days	Garhwal	None	15th Lok Sabha	2009	
14	Mala Rajya Laxmi Shah		Bharatiya Janata Party	4	13 October 2012	16 May 2014	13 years, 160 days	Tehri Garhwal	None	15th Lok Sabha	2012	Elected in the By-election.
14	Mala Rajya Laxmi Shah		Bharatiya Janata Party	4	16 May 2014	23 May 2019	13 years, 160 days	Tehri Garhwal	None	16th Lok Sabha	2014	
14	Mala Rajya Laxmi Shah		Bharatiya Janata Party	4	23 May 2019	4 June 2024	13 years, 160 days	Tehri Garhwal	None	17th Lok Sabha	2019	
14	Mala Rajya Laxmi Shah		Bharatiya Janata Party	4	4 June 2024	Incumbent	13 years, 160 days	Tehri Garhwal	None	18th Lok Sabha	2024	
15	Ajay Tamta		Bharatiya Janata Party	3	16 May 2014	23 May 2019	11 years, 310 days	Almora	SC	16th Lok Sabha	2014	
15	Ajay Tamta		Bharatiya Janata Party	3	23 May 2019	4 June 2024	11 years, 310 days	Almora	SC	17th Lok Sabha	2019	
15	Ajay Tamta		Bharatiya Janata Party	3	4 June 2024	Incumbent	11 years, 310 days	Almora	SC	18th Lok Sabha	2024	
16	Bhagat Singh Koshyari		Bharatiya Janata Party	1	16 May 2014	23 May 2019	5 years, 7 days	Nainital–Udhamsingh Nagar	None	16th Lok Sabha	2014	
17	Ramesh Pokhriyal		Bharatiya Janata Party	2	16 May 2014	23 May 2019	10 years, 19 days	Haridwar	None	16th Lok Sabha	2014	
17	Ramesh Pokhriyal		Bharatiya Janata Party	2	23 May 2019	4 June 2024	10 years, 19 days	Haridwar	None	17th Lok Sabha	2019	
18	Ajay Bhatt		Bharatiya Janata Party	2	23 May 2019	4 June 2024	6 years, 303 days	Nainital–Udhamsingh Nagar	None	17th Lok Sabha	2019	
18	Ajay Bhatt		Bharatiya Janata Party	2	4 June 2024	Incumbent	6 years, 303 days	Nainital–Udhamsingh Nagar	None	18th Lok Sabha	2024	
19	Tirath Singh Rawat		Bharatiya Janata Party	1	23 May 2019	4 June 2024	5 years, 12 days	Garhwal	None	17th Lok Sabha	2019	
20	Anil Baluni		Bharatiya Janata Party	1	4 June 2024	Incumbent	1 year, 291 days	Garhwal	None	18th Lok Sabha	2024	
21	Trivendra Singh Rawat		Bharatiya Janata Party	1	4 June 2024	Incumbent	1 year, 291 days	Haridwar	None	18th Lok Sabha	2024	

== See also ==
- List of Rajya Sabha members from Uttarakhand
- List of parliamentary constituencies in Uttarakhand
