= Elections in Uttarakhand =

Overview of the procedure of elections in the Indian state of Uttarakhand

Uttarakhand

Elections for the Uttarakhand Legislative Assembly (Uttarakhand Vidhan Sabha) in Uttarakhand state, India are conducted in accordance with the Constitution of India. The legislative assembly of Uttarakhand creates laws regarding the conduct of local body elections unilaterally while any changes by the state legislature to the conduct of state level elections need to be approved by the Parliament of India. In addition, the state legislature may be dismissed by the Parliament according to Article 356 of the Indian Constitution and President's rule may be imposed.

== Brief political history ==
Gangotri, Gangolihat and Srinagar are considered as bellwether seats as they voted for the winning party/alliance in every election since the state's formation. Ranikhet and Purola constituencies were considered a jinx for any party as they voted for the party which would sit in the opposition. However, this myth was broken in 2022, when the BJP formed the government while winning from both Ranikhet and Purola. It was also considered that every incumbent government would face defeat in the next election and not get re-elected. However, in 2022 the BJP broke this myth and got re-elected with an absolute majority. It is also believed that every incumbent chief minister loses their seat in the next election. This myth partially holds true (barring the first election in 2002). In Uttarakhand, the single-largest party has always formed the government despite not getting the majority.

=== Almora district ===
Most of the seats in the district were won by Congress in 2002 and 2007 while the BJP lead from the district in 2017 and 2022. It was evenly slit in 2012. It has shifted towards BJP since 2012 and has become one of its strongholds.

=== Bageshwar district ===
The district is considered a stronghold of the BJP as it won from this district in 2007,2017 and 2022. It was evenly split in 2012 and the Congress dominated it in 2002.

=== Chamoli district ===
The district was won by the BJP in 2002, 2007, 2012 and 2022. The Congress won it in 2012.It leans towards the BJP.

=== Champawat district ===
The district is considered a swing district as it was evenly split in 2007,2012 and 2022. The Congress and BJP won the district in 2002 and 2017 respectively. However, it has shifted towards BJP since incumbent CM Pushkar Singh Dhami's bypoll win from Champawat.

=== Dehradun district ===
It is considered as a stronghold of the BJP as it has voted majorly for the party in every election barring the 2002 election.

=== Haridwar district ===
The BJP dominated this district in 2012 and 2017. The BSP dominated in 2002 and 2007 and the Congress in 2022. The BJP secured its best rural local body result from the district in 2022.

=== Nainital district ===
The district was won by the BJP in 2007,2017 and 2022 and by the Congress in 2002 and 2012. It has shifted towards the BJP in recent years and become a stronghold of the party.

=== Pithoragarh district ===
It is another swing district as it was split evenly in 2002 and 2022. The BJP dominated the district in 2007 and 2017 and the Congress in 2012.

=== Pauri Garhwal district ===
The district was dominated by the BJP in 2007, 2017 and 2022 and by the Congress in 2002. It was evenly split in 2012. It has shifted towards BJP in recent years and has become one of its strongholds.

=== Rudraprayag district ===
The district was won by the BJP in 2002, 2007 and 2022. The Congress won it in 2012 and it was split in 2017. It typically leans towards the BJP and is considered a safe district for the party.

=== Tehri Garhwal district ===
The district was won by the BJP in 2017 and 2022 and by the Congress in 2002. It was evenly split in 2007 and 2012. It has shifted towards the BJP in recent years and has become one of its strongholds.

=== Udham Singh Nagar district ===
The district was won by the BJP in 2012 and 2017 and by the Congress in 2007 and 2022. It was split in 2002. It is another swing district.

=== Uttarkashi district ===
The district was won by the BJP in 2017 and 2022. It was evenly split in 2002 and 2012. In 2007, Congress dominated the district. It is considered a safe district for the BJP.

== Major political parties ==
The Bharatiya Janata Party, Indian National Congress have been the most popular parties in the state since its inception. Other influential parties include, Bahujan Samaj Party, Aam Aadmi Party and Uttarakhand Kranti Dal.

== Lok Sabha elections ==
Keys: BJP (18) INC (6) SP (1)

Election	Lok Sabha	Party-wise details		Constituencies						Ref.
Election	Lok Sabha	Party	Seats	Tehri Garhwal	Garhwal	Almora	Nainital	Nainital–Udhamsingh Nagar	Haridwar	Ref.
2004	14th Lok Sabha	BJP	3	BJP	BJP	BJP	INC	did not exist	SP	
2004	14th Lok Sabha	INC	1	BJP	BJP	BJP	INC	did not exist	SP	
2004	14th Lok Sabha	SP	1	BJP	BJP	BJP	INC	did not exist	SP	
2009	15th Lok Sabha	INC	5	INC	INC	INC	Constituency abolished	INC	INC	
2014	16th Lok Sabha	BJP	5	BJP	BJP	BJP	Constituency abolished	BJP	BJP	
2019	17th Lok Sabha	BJP	5	BJP	BJP	BJP	Constituency abolished	BJP	BJP	
2024	18th Lok Sabha	BJP	5	BJP	BJP	BJP	Constituency abolished	BJP	BJP	

== Vidhan Sabha elections ==
Keys: BJP (189) INC (119) BSP (20) UKD/UKD(P) (8) NCP (1) Independent (13)

Election	Vidhan Sabha	Party-wise details		Chief Minister	Party
Election	Vidhan Sabha	Party	Seats	Chief Minister	Party
2002	1st Vidhan Sabha	INC	36	Narayan Datt Tiwari	INC
2002	1st Vidhan Sabha	BJP	19	Narayan Datt Tiwari	INC
2002	1st Vidhan Sabha	BSP	7	Narayan Datt Tiwari	INC
2002	1st Vidhan Sabha	UKD	4	Narayan Datt Tiwari	INC
2002	1st Vidhan Sabha	NCP	1	Narayan Datt Tiwari	INC
2002	1st Vidhan Sabha	IND	3	Narayan Datt Tiwari	INC
2002	1st Vidhan Sabha	Total	70	Narayan Datt Tiwari	INC
2007	2nd Vidhan Sabha	BJP	35	Bhuwan Chandra Khanduri (2007–09)	BJP
2007	2nd Vidhan Sabha	INC	21	Bhuwan Chandra Khanduri (2007–09)	BJP
2007	2nd Vidhan Sabha	BSP	8	Ramesh Pokhriyal (2009–11)	BJP
2007	2nd Vidhan Sabha	UKD	3	Ramesh Pokhriyal (2009–11)	BJP
2007	2nd Vidhan Sabha	IND	3	Bhuwan Chandra Khanduri (2011–12)	BJP
2007	2nd Vidhan Sabha	Total	70	Bhuwan Chandra Khanduri (2011–12)	BJP
2012	3rd Vidhan Sabha	INC	32	Vijay Bahuguna (2012–14)	INC
2012	3rd Vidhan Sabha	BJP	31	Vijay Bahuguna (2012–14)	INC
2012	3rd Vidhan Sabha	BSP	3	Vijay Bahuguna (2012–14)	INC
2012	3rd Vidhan Sabha	UKD(P)	1	Harish Rawat (2014–17)	INC
2012	3rd Vidhan Sabha	IND	3	Harish Rawat (2014–17)	INC
2012	3rd Vidhan Sabha	Total	70	Harish Rawat (2014–17)	INC
2017	4th Vidhan Sabha	BJP	57	Trivendra Singh Rawat (2017–21)	BJP
2017	4th Vidhan Sabha	INC	11	Trivendra Singh Rawat (2017–21)	BJP
2017	4th Vidhan Sabha	IND	2	Pushkar Singh Dhami (2021-2022)	BJP
2017	4th Vidhan Sabha	Total	70	Pushkar Singh Dhami (2021-2022)	BJP
2022	5th Vidhan Sabha	BJP	47	Pushkar Singh Dhami (2022–incumbent)	BJP
2022	5th Vidhan Sabha	INC	19	Pushkar Singh Dhami (2022–incumbent)	BJP
2022	5th Vidhan Sabha	BSP	2	Pushkar Singh Dhami (2022–incumbent)	BJP
2022	5th Vidhan Sabha	IND	2	Pushkar Singh Dhami (2022–incumbent)	BJP
2022	5th Vidhan Sabha	Total	70	Pushkar Singh Dhami (2022–incumbent)	BJP

=== 1st Assembly Election, 2002 ===
2002 Uttarakhand Legislative Assembly elections were the first Vidhan Sabha (Legislative Assembly) elections held in the state. The Interim Uttaranchal Assembly was led by Chief Minister Bhagat Singh Koshyari prior to the election, but no chief ministerial candidate was named before the elections. The Indian National Congress emerged as the largest party with 36 seats in the 70-seat legislature whereas the Bharatiya Janata Party secured the second place with 19 seats. Veteran Congress leader N. D. Tiwari was chosen as the new Chief Minister despite him not being a member of the legislative assembly. He later won the by-election held to the Ramnagar constituency.

=== 2nd Assembly Election, 2007 ===
2007 Uttarakhand state assembly elections were the second Vidhan Sabha elections held in the state. The Bharatiya Janata Party emerged as the single largest party with 35 seats in the 70-seat legislature. One seat short of forming a majority, the BJP had to rely on the support of the Uttarakhand Kranti Dal and three independents to form the government. Former Union Minister B. C. Khanduri became the new Chief Minister despite him not being a member of the legislative assembly. He later won the by-election held to the Dhumakot constituency. The Indian National Congress was the official opposition, holding 21 seats. Ramesh Pokhriyal briefly held the post of chief minister after B.C. Khanduri resigned due to the BJP's dismal performance in the 2009 Lok Sabha elections from the state. However, he was replaced by B.C. Khanduri after two years due to corruption allegations revealed against him.

=== 3rd Assembly Election, 2012 ===
2012 Uttarakhand state assembly elections were the third Vidhan Sabha elections held in the state. Uttarakhand had turned out incumbent governments in the first two elections held in the state since its formation. The ruling Bharatiya Janata Party fought the election under the leadership of its Chief Minister B. C. Khanduri. The main opposition Indian National Congress was led in the assembly by Harak Singh Rawat, but no chief ministerial candidate was named before the elections. The tenure of former Chief Minister Ramesh Pokhriyal, which was marked by large-scale corruption accusations, was likely to be the main election issue.

The elections took place on 30 January, with the results being announced on 6 March. In a closely contested election, the Indian National Congress emerged as the single largest party with 32 seats followed by the Bharatiya Janata Party with 31 seats. Notably the incumbent Chief minister B. C. Khanduri lost from his seat. Vijay Bahuguna was appointed as Chief minister despite him not being a member of the legislative assembly. He later won the by-election held to the Sitarganj constituency.

Later, Harish Rawat took over as the chief minister in 2014. He was elected from a bypoll in Dharchula Assembly constituency. In 2016, a brief period of President's rule was imposed in the state after 9 Congress mla's including former chief minister Vijay Bahuguna and former minister Harak Singh Rawat, switched over to the BJP. Ultimately, Harish Rawat managed to hold on to his government.

=== 4th Assembly Election, 2017 ===
2017 Uttarakhand state assembly elections were the fourth Vidhan Sabha elections held in the state. The Bharatiya Janata Party riding on the popularity of Prime Minister Narendra Modi, secured a record landslide victory, winning 57 of the total 70 seats. The ruling Indian National Congress was reduced to a record low of 11 seats, with the incumbent Chief Minister Harish Rawat himself losing from both the seats that he had contested from. Although the BJP had not projected anyone as its chief ministerial candidate, Trivendra Singh Rawat was chosen as the new Chief Minister after the elections. In 2021, Tirath Singh Rawat briefly became the Chief Minister, followed by Pushkar Singh Dhami.

=== 5th Assembly Election, 2022 ===
2022 Uttarakhand state assembly elections were the fifth Vidhan Sabha elections held in the state. The Bharatiya Janata Party, despite its tally of seats shrinking significantly, secured a landslide victory, winning 47 of the total 70 seats. It was the first time in the history of Uttarakhand when the ruling party came back to power in the state winning back-to-back assembly elections, although the incumbent Chief Minister Pushkar Singh Dhami lost his seat. The main opposition Indian National Congress bagged 19 seats, with their party leader Harish Rawat also losing from his seat once again. Dhami was later elected from a bypoll in Champawat and was re-elected as the chief minister.

== Local Body elections ==
Local body elections are held every 5 years, each for the urban bodies and the rural bodies. The rural local bodies are non-partisan, though most candidates are backed by major political parties. Meawhile the BJP performs well in the urban local bodies. Congress is also a major party in these elections. The latest local body election was held in 2026.

== See also ==
- Local elections in Uttarakhand
- List of by-elections to the Uttarakhand Legislative Assembly
