= Uttarakhand Pradesh Congress Committee =

- President: Ganesh Godiyal
- Chairman: Yashpal Arya (Leader of the Opposition)
- Founded: 2000
- Split from: UPCC
- Headquarters: 21 Rajpur Road, Dehradun-248001, Uttarakhand
- Youth wing: Uttarakhand Youth Congress
- Women's wing: Uttarakhand Pradesh Mahila Congress Committee
- Ideology: Populism; Social liberalism; Democratic socialism; Social democracy; Secularism
- Political position: Centre
- ECI status: A State Unit of Indian National Congress
- Alliance: Indian National Developmental Inclusive Alliance
- Seats in Rajya Sabha: 0 / 3
- Seats in Lok Sabha: 0 / 5
- Seats in Uttarakhand Legislative Assembly: 20 / 70

Election symbol

Website
- uttarakhandpradeshcongress.com

Uttarakhand Pradesh Congress Committee or UPCC is the state wing of the Indian National Congress (INC) in Uttarakhand. It is responsible for organizing and coordinating the party's activities and campaigns within the state, as well as selecting candidates for local, state, and national elections. The current president of the Uttarakhand PCC is Ganesh Godiyal. The committee has a significant presence in the state's politics and has been in power in the state several times since its formation in 2000.

== Structure and composition ==
S.No.	Name	Designation
1.	Kumari Selja	AICC Incharge; Uttarakhand
2.	Ganesh Godiyal	President; Uttarakhand Pradesh Congress Committee
3.	Jyoti Rautela	President; Uttarakhand Pradesh Mahila Congress
4.	Vishal Singh Bhojak	President; Uttarakhand Pradesh Youth Congress
5.	Vikas Negi	President; Uttarakhand Pradesh NSUI

== List of presidents ==
S.No.	President	Portrait	Term		Ref.
1		Harish Rawat	9 November 2000	October 2007	
2		Yashpal Arya	October 2007	12 June 2014	
3		Kishore Upadhyaya	13 June 2014	3 May 2017	
4		Pritam Singh	4 May 2017	22 July 2021	
5		Ganesh Godiyal	22 July 2021	10 April 2022	
6		Karan Mahara	10 April 2022	11 November 2025	
(5)		Ganesh Godiyal	11 November 2025	Incumbent	

== List of chief ministers ==
S.No.	Portrait	Chief Ministers	Constituency	Term in Office			Assembly (Election)	Ministry	Ref(s)
S.No.	Portrait	Chief Ministers	Constituency	Start	End	Tenure	Assembly (Election)	Ministry	Ref(s)
1		Narayan Datt Tiwari	Ramnagar	2 March 2002	7 March 2007	5 years, 5 days	1st Assembly (2002)	Tiwari	
2		Vijay Bahuguna	Sitarganj	13 March 2012	31 January 2014	1 year, 324 days	3rd Assembly (2012)	Bahuguna	
3		Harish Rawat	Dharchula	1 February 2014	27 March 2016	2 years, 55 days	3rd Assembly (2012)	Rawat	
3		Harish Rawat	Dharchula	21 April 2016	22 April 2016	1 day	3rd Assembly (2012)	Rawat	
3		Harish Rawat	Dharchula	11 May 2016	18 March 2017	311 days (total 3 years and 2 days)	3rd Assembly (2012)	Rawat	

== List of Leaders of Opposition ==
S.no	Name	Portrait	Term			Assembly (Election)
1	Harak Singh Rawat		13 March 2007	9 March 2012	4 years, 362 days	2nd Assmebly (2007)
2	Indira Hridayesh		27 March 2017	13 June 2021	4 years, 78 days	4th Assembly (2017)
3	Pritam Singh		23 July 2021	11 March 2022	231 days	4th Assembly (2017)
4	Yashpal Arya		10 April 2022	Incumbent	4 years, 218 days	5th Assembly (2022)

== List of AICC Incharges ==
S.no	Incharge	Portrait	Term		
1.	Ch. Birender Singh				
2.	Ambika Soni		16 June 2013	2 April 2018	4 years, 290 days
3.	Anugrah Narayan Singh		2 April 2018	11 September 2020	2 years, 162 days
4.	Devender Yadav		11 September 2020	24 December 2023	3 years, 104 days
5.	Kumari Selja		24 December 2023	Incumbent	2 years, 325 days

== Electoral performance ==
=== Legislative Assembly elections ===
Year	Legislature	Party leader	Votes polled	Seats won	Change in seats	Outcome
2002	1st Vidhan Sabha	Harish Rawat	769,991	36 / 70	36	Government
2007	2nd Vidhan Sabha	Harish Rawat	1,116,511	21 / 70	▼15	Opposition
2012	3rd Vidhan Sabha	Yashpal Arya	1,436,042	32 / 70	▲11	Government with PDF
2017	4th Vidhan Sabha	Kishore Upadhyaya	1,665,664	11 / 70	▼21	Opposition
2022	5th Vidhan Sabha	Ganesh Godiyal	2,038,509	19 / 70	▲8	Opposition

=== Lok Sabha elections ===
Year	Legislature	Party leader	Votes polled	Seats won	Change in seats	Outcome
2004	14th Lok Sabha	Harish Rawat	1,024,062	1 / 5	1	Government with UPA
2009	15th Lok Sabha	Yashpal Arya	1,354,468	5 / 5	▲4	Government with UPA
2014	16th Lok Sabha	Yashpal Arya	1,494,440	0 / 5	▼5	Opposition
2019	17th Lok Sabha	Pritam Singh	1,520,767	0 / 5	Steady	Opposition
2024	18th Lok Sabha	Karan Mahara	1,564,258	0 / 5	Steady	Opposition

=== Local elections ===
Year	Municipal Corporation	Seats Won	Change in Seats	Status (in legislature)	Mayoral election result
Dehradun district
2008	Dehradun Municipal Corporation	24 / 60	—	Opposition	Lost
2013	Dehradun Municipal Corporation	22 / 60	▼2	Opposition	Lost
2018	Dehradun Municipal Corporation	34 / 100	▲12	Opposition	Lost
2025	Dehradun Municipal Corporation	24 / 100	▼10	Opposition	Lost
2018	Rishikesh Municipal Corporation	9 / 40	—	Opposition	Lost
2025	Rishikesh Municipal Corporation	6 / 40	▼3	Opposition	Lost
Haridwar district
2013	Haridwar Municipal Corporation	6 / 30	—	Opposition	Lost
2018	Haridwar Municipal Corporation	18 / 60	▲12	Minority	Won
2025	Haridwar Municipal Corporation	15 / 60	▼3	Opposition	Lost
2013	Roorkee Municipal Corporation	5 / 20	—	Opposition	Lost
2019	Roorkee Municipal Corporation	2 / 40	▼3	Opposition	Lost
2025	Roorkee Municipal Corporation	2 / 40	Steady	Opposition	Lost
Udham Singh Nagar
2013	Rudrapur Municipal Corporation	4 / 20	—	Opposition	Lost
2018	Rudrapur Municipal Corporation	10 / 40	▲6	Opposition	Lost
2025	Rudrapur Municipal Corporation	12 / 40	▲2	Opposition	Lost
2013	Kashipur Municipal Corporation	5 / 20	—	Opposition	Lost
2018	Kashipur Municipal Corporation	12 / 40	▲7	Opposition	Lost
2025	Kashipur Municipal Corporation	14 / 40	▲2	Opposition	Lost
Nainital
2013	Haldwani Municipal Corporation	5 / 20	—	Opposition	Lost
2018	Haldwani Municipal Corporation	16 / 60	▲11	Opposition	Lost
2025	Haldwani Municipal Corporation	18 / 60	▲2	Opposition	Lost
Pauri Garhwal
2018	Kotdwar Municipal Corporation	13 / 40	—	Government	Won
2025	Kotdwar Municipal Corporation	9 / 40	▼4	Opposition	Lost
2025	Srinagar Municipal Corporation	6 / 40	New entry	Third Place	Lost
Almora
2025	Almora Municipal Corporation	0 / 40	New entry	–	Lost
Pithoragarh
2025	Pithoragarh Municipal Corporation	12 / 40	New entry	Opposition	Lost

== List of Union Ministers ==
=== Cabinet ministers ===
No.	Portrait	Minister	Portfolio	Term in Office			Constituency (House)	Prime Minister
No.	Portrait	Minister	Portfolio	Assumed Office	Left Office	Time in Office	Constituency (House)	Prime Minister
1		Harish Rawat (born 1948)	Minister of Water Resources	28 October 2012	31 January 2014	1 year, 95 days	Haridwar (Lok Sabha)	Manmohan Singh

=== Minister of State (MoS) ===
No.	Portrait	Minister	Portfolio	Term in Office			Constituency (House)	Prime Minister
No.	Portrait	Minister	Portfolio	Assumed Office	Left Office	Time in Office	Constituency (House)	Prime Minister
1		Harish Rawat (born 1948)	Minister of State of Labour and Employment	28 May 2009	19 January 2011	1 year, 236 days	Haridwar (Lok Sabha)	Manmohan Singh
1		Harish Rawat (born 1948)	Minister of Agriculture and Food Processing Industries	19 January 2011	28 October 2012	1 year, 283 days	Haridwar (Lok Sabha)	Manmohan Singh
1		Harish Rawat (born 1948)	Minister of State of Parliamentary Affairs	12 July 2011	28 October 2012	1 year, 108 days	Haridwar (Lok Sabha)	Manmohan Singh

== List of District Congress Presidents ==
District	Organisational District	President	Term
Almora	Almora	Bhupendra Singh Bhoj	2025
Almora	Ranikhet	Deepak Kirola	2025
Bageshwar	Bageshwar	Arjun Chandra Bhatt	2025
Chamoli	Chamoli DCC	Suresh Dimri	2025
Champawat	Champawat	Chirag Singh Fartyal	2025
Dehradun	Dehradun City	Jasvinder Singh Gogi	2025
Dehradun	Pacchuwadoon	Sanjay Kishore	2025
Dehradun	Parwadoon	Mohit Uniyal	2025
Haridwar	Haridwar	Baleshwar Singh	2025
Haridwar	Haridwar City	Aman Garg	2025
Haridwar	Roorkee	Furqan Ahmad	2025
Haridwar	Roorkee City	Rajendra Kumar Chaudhary	2025
Nainital	Nainital	Rahul Chhimwal	2025
Nainital	Haldwani City	Govind Singh Bisht	2025
Pauri Garhwal	Pauri Garhwal	Vinod Singh Negi	2025
Pauri Garhwal	Kotdwar	Vikas Negi	2025
Pauri Garhwal	Kotdwar City	Meena Devi	2025
Pithoragarh	Pithoragarh	Mukesh Pant	2025
Pithoragarh	Didihat	Manohar Singh Tolia	2025
Rudraprayag	Rudraprayag	Kuldeep Kandari	2025
Tehri Garhwal	Tehri Garhwal	Murari Lal Khandwal	2025
Tehri Garhwal	Devprayag	Uttam Aswal	2025
Udham Singh Nagar	Udham Singh Nagar	Himanshu Gaba	2025
Udham Singh Nagar	Kashipur City	Alka Pal	2025
Udham Singh Nagar	Rudrapur City	Mamta Rani	2025
Uttarkashi	Uttarkashi	Pradeep Singh Rawat	2025
Uttarkashi	Purola	Dinesh Chouhan	2025

== See also ==
- Indian National Congress
- Congress Working Committee
- All India Congress Committee
- Pradesh Congress Committee
- Bharatiya Janata Party, Uttarakhand
- Uttarakhand Kranti Dal
