= List of by-elections to the Uttarakhand Legislative Assembly =

The following is a list of by-elections held for the Uttarakhand Legislative Assembly, India, since its formation in 2002.

== 2002–2007 ==
S.No.	Date	Constituency		MLA before election	Party before election	Elected MLA	Party after election	Ref.
1	8 August 2002	56	Ramnagar	Yogambar Singh Rawat	Indian National Congress	Narayan Datt Tiwari	Indian National Congress	
2	28 September 2004	48	Dwarahat	Bipin Chandra Tripathi	Uttarakhand Kranti Dal	Pushpesh Tripathi	Uttarakhand Kranti Dal	
3	28 September 2005	29	Kotdwar	Surendra Singh Negi	Indian National Congress	Surendra Singh Negi	Indian National Congress	

=== Dwarahat Assembly By-election 2004 ===
2004 Uttarakhand Legislative Assembly by-election : Dwarahat
Party	Candidate	Votes	%	±%
UKD	Pushpesh Tripathi	13,224	42.08%	▲5.09
INC	Mahesh Singh	8,160	25.96%	▲2.29
BJP	Mohan Singh Adhikari	4,359	13.87%	▼7.75
Independent	Jagat Singh Negi	2,599	8.27%	New
Independent	Prakash Chandra	1,105	3.52%	New
SP	Chani Ram	726	2.31%	▲0.32
Independent	Pramod Kumar	661	2.10%	New
BSP	Viond Kumar	595	1.89%	▼8.67
Margin of victory		5,064	16.12%	▲2.80
Turnout		31,429	48.98%	▼0.21
Registered electors		64,125		▲4.67
UKD hold		Swing	▲5.09	

== 2007–2012 ==
S.No.	Date	Constituency		MLA before election	Party before election	Elected MLA	Party after election	Ref.
1	29 August 2007	30	Dhumakot	Tejpal Singh Rawat	Indian National Congress	Bhuwan Chandra Khanduri	Bharatiya Janata Party	
2	28 May 2009	42	Kapkot	Bhagat Singh Koshyari	Bharatiya Janata Party	Sher Singh Garhia	Bharatiya Janata Party	
3	14 September 2009	11	Vikasnagar	Munna Singh Chauhan	Bharatiya Janata Party	Kuldip Kumar	Bharatiya Janata Party	

=== Dhumakot Assembly By-election 2007 ===
2007 Uttarakhand Legislative Assembly by-election : Dhumakot
Party	Candidate	Votes	%	±%
BJP	Bhuwan Chandra Khanduri	22,708	70.76%	▲30.16
INC	Surendra Singh Negi	8,537	26.60%	▼18.81
Independent	Manish Sundriyal	848	2.64%	New
Margin of victory		14,171	44.16%	▲39.35
Turnout		32,093	59.79%	▲4.77
Registered electors		53,986		▼6.40
BJP gain from INC		Swing	▲25.35	

=== Kapkot Assembly by-election 2009 ===
Uttarakhand Legislative Assembly by-election 2009: Kapkot
Party	Candidate	Votes	%	±%
BJP	Sher Singh Garhia	13,823	45.04	▼12.62
NCP	Kunti Parihar	6,656	21.68	new
INC	Chamu Singh Ghasiyal	5,651	18.41	▼13.44
Majority		7,167	23.36	▼2.46
Turnout		30,687	58.36	▼9.57
Registered electors		52,582		
BJP hold		Swing	▼2.46	

=== Assembly By-election 2009 ===
2009 Uttarakhand Legislative Assembly by-election : Vikasnagar
Party	Candidate	Votes	%	±%
BJP	Kuldip Kumar	24,934	37.12%	▼3.25
INC	Nav Prabhat	24,338	36.23%	▲2.96
Independent	Munna Singh Chauhan	14,807	22.04%	New
Independent	Haridas Kataria	702	1.05%	New
SP	Gulfam Ali	591	0.88%	▼1.37
Independent	Nasim Ahmad	378	0.56%	New
Independent	Liyaqat	350	0.52%	New
Margin of victory		596	0.89%	▼6.22
Turnout		67,175	58.88%	▼4.96
Registered electors		1,14,092		
BJP hold		Swing	▼3.25	

== 2012–2017 ==
S.No.	Date	Constituency		MLA before election	Party before election	Elected MLA	Party after election	Ref.
1	8 July 2012	68	Sitarganj	Kiran Mandal	Bharatiya Janata Party	Vijay Bahuguna	Indian National Congress	
2	21 July 2014	23	Doiwala	Ramesh Pokhriyal 'Nishank'	Bharatiya Janata Party	Hira Singh Bisht	Indian National Congress	
3	21 July 2014	42	Dharchula	Harish Singh Dhami	Indian National Congress	Harish Rawat	Indian National Congress	
4	21 July 2014	51	Someshwar (SC)	Ajay Tamta	Bharatiya Janata Party	Rekha Arya	Indian National Congress	
5	11 April 2015	28	Bhagwanpur (SC)	Surendra Rakesh	Bahujan Samaj Party	Mamta Rakesh	Indian National Congress	

=== Sitarganj Assembly Bye-election 2012 ===
2012 Uttarakhand Legislative Assembly by-election : Sitarganj
Party	Candidate	Votes	%	±%
INC	Vijay Bahuguna	53,766	77.14%	▲56.13
BJP	Prakash Pant	13,812	19.82%	▼19.85
Independent	S. Ali	793	1.14%	New
Uttarakhand Parivartan Party	D. S. Bisht	668	0.96%	New
Independent	P. Singh	438	0.63%	New
Margin of victory		39,954	57.33%	▲40.24
Turnout		69,695	76.22%	▼4.47
Registered electors		91,443		
INC gain from BJP		Swing	▲37.48	

=== Dharchula Assembly By-election 2014 ===
2014 Uttarakhand Legislative Assembly by-election : Dharchula
Party	Candidate	Votes	%	±%
INC	Harish Rawat	31,214	74.63%	▲41.68
BJP	Bishnu Datt Joshi	10,610	25.37%	▲3.52
NOTA	None of the above	1,028	2.46%	New
Margin of victory		20,604	49.26%	▲38.15
Turnout		41,824	52.61%	▼14.30
Registered electors		81,469		▲11.98
INC hold		Swing		

=== Doiwala Assembly By-election 2014 ===
2014 Uttarakhand Legislative Assembly by-election : Doiwala
Party	Candidate	Votes	%	±%
INC	Hira Singh Bisht	35,980	52.49%	▲23.51
BJP	Trivendra Singh Rawat	29,468	42.99%	▲12.35
Independent	Furqan	1,508	2.20%	New
INC	None of the above	542	0.79%	▼28.18
Independent	William Akbar Chand	363	0.53%	New
Independent	Rishi Kumar	348	0.51%	New
Margin of victory		6,512	9.50%	▲7.84
Turnout		68,550	53.55%	▼18.40
Registered electors		1,29,032		▲20.57
INC gain from BJP		Swing	▲21.85	

=== Bhagwanpur Assembly By-election 2015 ===
2015 Uttarakhand Legislative Assembly by-election : Bhagwanpur
Party	Candidate	Votes	%	±%
INC	Mamta Rakesh	59,205	71.46%	▲33.21
BJP	Rajpal Singh	22,296	26.91%	▲13.35
NOTA	None of the above	501	0.60%	New
Independent	Pritam Singh	269	0.32%	New
Margin of victory		36,909	44.55%	▲35.92
Turnout		82,842	73.92%	▼5.80
Registered electors		112,069		▲13.72
INC gain from BSP		Swing	▲21.71	

== 2017–2022 ==
S.No.	Date	Constituency		MLA before election	Party before election	Elected MLA	Party after election	Ref.
1	28 May 2018	5	Tharali (SC)	Magan Lal Shah	Bharatiya Janata Party	Munni Shah	Bharatiya Janata Party	
2	25 November 2019	44	Pithoragarh	Prakash Pant	Bharatiya Janata Party	Chandra Pant	Bharatiya Janata Party	
3	17 April 2021	49	Salt	Surendra Singh Jeena	Bharatiya Janata Party	Mahesh Singh Jeena	Bharatiya Janata Party	

=== Tharali Assembly Constituency ===
2018 Uttarakhand Legislative Assembly by-election : Tharali
Party	Candidate	Votes	%	±%
BJP	Munni Shah	25,737	49.04%	▲5.64
INC	Jeet Ram	23,756	45.27%	▲10.00
	Kasbi Lal Shah	1,365	2.60%	New
CPI(M)	Kunwar Ram	1,034	1.97%	▲0.71
NOTA	None of the above	705	1.34%	New
Independent	Beeri Ram	587	1.12%	New
Margin of victory		1,981	3.77%	▼4.36
Turnout		52,479	51.98%	▼6.82
Registered electors		1,02,569		▼0.45
BJP hold		Swing	▲5.64	

=== Pithoragarh Assembly Constituency ===
2019 Uttarakhand Legislative Assembly by-election : Pithoragarh
Party	Candidate	Votes	%	±%
BJP	Chandra Pant	26,086	52.44%	▲3.28
INC	Anju Lunthi	22,819	45.88%	▲0.72
NOTA	None of the above	844	1.70%	▲0.10
SP	Manoj Kumar Bhatt	835	1.68%	▲1.52
Margin of victory		3,267	6.57%	▲2.56
Turnout		49,740	45.65%	▼17.17
Registered electors		1,09,957		▲2.41
BJP hold		Swing	▲3.28	

=== Salt Assembly Election ===
2021 Uttarakhand Legislative Assembly by-election : Salt
Party	Candidate	Votes	%	±%
BJP	Mahesh Singh Jeena	21,874	52.87%	▲3.87
INC	Ganga Pancholi	17,177	41.52%	▼0.89
NOTA	None of the above	721	1.74%	New
Independent	Surendra Singh	620	1.50%	New
Uttarakhand Parivartan Party	Jagdish Chandra	493	1.19%	▲0.58
Independent	Shiv Singh Rawat	466	1.13%	New
Independent	Pan Singh	346	0.84%	New
	Nand Kishor	209	0.51%	New
Margin of victory		4,697	11.35%	▲4.76
Turnout		41,373	42.70%	▼3.42
Registered electors		97,150		▲1.48
BJP hold		Swing	▲3.87	

== 2022–2027 ==
S.No.	Date	Constituency		MLA before election	Party before election	Elected MLA	Party after election	Ref.
1	31 May 2022	55	Champawat	Kailash Chandra Gahtori	Bharatiya Janata Party	Pushkar Singh Dhami	Bharatiya Janata Party	
2	9 September 2023	47	Bageshwar (SC)	Chandan Ram Das	Bharatiya Janata Party	Parwati Das	Bharatiya Janata Party	
3	10 July 2024	4	Badrinath	Rajendra Singh Bhandari	Indian National Congress	Lakhpat Singh Butola	Indian National Congress	
4	10 July 2024	33	Manglaur	Sarwat Karim Ansari	Bahujan Samaj Party	Muhammad Nizamuddin	Indian National Congress	
5	20 November 2024	7	Kedarnath	Shaila Rani Rawat	Bharatiya Janata Party	Asha Nautiyal	Bharatiya Janata Party	

=== Champawat Assembly Constituency ===
2022 Uttarakhand Legislative Assembly by-election : Champawat
Party	Candidate	Votes	%	±%
BJP	Pushkar Singh Dhami	58,258	93.50%	▲43.24
INC	Nirmala Gahtori	3,233	5.19%	▼36.74
SP	Manoj Kumar Bhatt	413	0.66%	▲0.33
Independent	Himanshu Garhkoti	402	0.65%	New
NOTA	None of the Above	377	0.61%	▼0.86
Margin of victory		55,025	88.31%	▲80.12
Turnout		62,306	64.43%	▼2.64
Registered electors		97,619		▲0.19
BJP hold		Swing	▲43.24	

=== Bageshwar Assembly Constituency ===
Uttarakhand Legislative Assembly by-election, 2023: Bageshwar
Party	Candidate	Votes	%	±%
BJP	Parwati Das	33,247	49.54	▲6.4
INC	Basant Kumar	30,842	45.96	▲19.08
NOTA	None of the Above	1,257	1.87	▲0.71
UKD	Arjun Kumar Dev	857	1.28	New
SP	Bhagwati Prasad	637	0.95	▲0.27
Majority		2,405	3.58	▼12.68
Turnout		67,108	55.44	N/A
BJP hold		Swing		

=== Badrinath Assembly Constituency ===
Uttarakhand Legislative Assembly by-election 2024: Badrinath
Party	Candidate	Votes	%	±%
INC	Lakhpat Singh Butola	28,167	51.93	▲4.05
BJP	Rajendra Singh Bhandari	22,937	42.30	▼2.55
Independent	Naval Kishore Khali	1,813	3.34	New
NOTA	None of the Above	823	1.52	▲0.24
Sainik Samaj Party	Himmat Singh Negi	494	0.91	New
Majority		5,230	9.9	▲6.87
Turnout		54,228	49.8	▼15.29
INC hold		Swing		

=== Manglaur Assembly Constituency ===
2024 Uttarakhand Legislative Assembly by-election : Manglaur
Party	Candidate	Votes	%	±%
INC	Muhammad Nizamuddin	31,727	37.91	▲1.41
BJP	Kartar Singh Bhadana	31,305	37.4	▲16.04
BSP	Obaidur Rehman	19,559	23.37	▼13.81
NOTA	None of the Above	237	0.28	▼0.02
Majority		422	0.5	▼0.18
Turnout		83,699	69.73	▼5.85
INC gain from BSP		Swing		

=== Kedarnath Assembly Constituency ===
Uttarakhand Legislative Assembly by-election, 2024: Kedarnath
Party	Candidate	Votes	%	±%
BJP	Asha Nautiyal	23,814	43.74	▲7.7
INC	Manoj Rawat	18,192	33.42	▲12.74
Independent	Tribhuwan Rawat	9,311	17.10	New
UKD	Ashutosh Bhandari	1,314	2.41	▲0.30
NOTA	None of the Above	834	1.53	▲0.29
Majority		5,622	10.32	▼3.62
Turnout		53,526	58.89%	▼6.39
BJP hold		Swing		

== See also ==
- Elections in Uttarakhand
- List of Indian state legislative assembly elections
