= 2004 Indian general election in Uttaranchal =

- 10 May 2004

5 seats
- Turnout: 48.07%

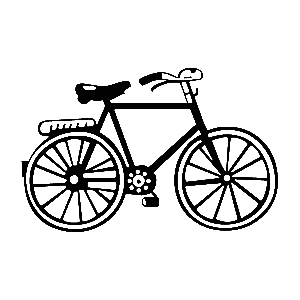
	First party	Second party	Third party
Party	BJP	INC	SP
Alliance	NDA	INC+ (post poll UPA)	SP+
Seats won	3	1	1
Popular vote	10,95,316	10,24,062	2,12,085
Percentage	40.98%	38.31%	7.93%
Swing	New	New	New
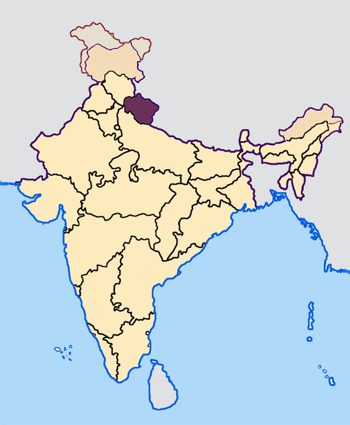
- Uttaranchal
Prime Minister before election
Atal Bihari Vajpayee
BJP
Prime Minister after election
Manmohan Singh
INC

The 2004 Indian general election in Uttaranchal, occurred for 5 seats in the state. 3 seats were won by the Bharatiya Janata Party, 1 seat by Indian National Congress and 1 seat by Samajwadi Party.

== Schedule ==
Event	Date
Date for Nominations	16 April 2004
Last Date for filing Nominations	23 April 2004
Date for scrutiny of nominations	24 April 2004
Last date for withdrawal of candidatures	26 April 2004
Date of poll	10 May 2004
Date of counting	13 May 2004

== Parties and alliances ==
=== National Democratic Alliance ===
Party	Flag	Symbol	Leader	Seats contested
Bharatiya Janata Party			B. C. Khanduri	5

=== United Progressive Alliance ===
Party	Flag	Symbol	Leader	Seats contested
Indian National Congress			Harish Rawat	5

== Results by Party ==
Party Name	Popular vote			Seats		
Party Name	Votes	%	±pp	Contested	Won	+/−
BJP	10,95,316	40.98	▲1.36	5	3	▼1
INC	10,24,062	38.31	▲0.17	5	1	Steady
SP	2,12,085	7.93	▲1.75	5	1	▲1
BSP	1,80,885	6.77	▼5.60	3	0	Steady
UKKD	43,899	1.64	▲1.13	4	0	Steady
Others	40,530	1.51	Steady	14	0	Steady
IND	76,094	2.85	▲1.32	18	0	Steady
Total	26,72,871	100%	-	54	5	-

== Elected MPs ==
Following is the list of elected MPs from Uttaranchal.

Constituency		Winner				Runner Up				Margin	%
#	Name	Candidate	Party	Votes	%	Candidate	Party	Votes	%	Margin	%
1	Tehri Garhwal	Manabendra Shah	BJP	267,395	47.63	Vijay Bahuguna	INC	249,949	44.52	17,446	3.11
2	Garhwal	B. C. Khanduri	BJP	257,726	51.21	Tejpal Singh Rawat	INC	206,764	41.09	50,962	10.13
3	Almora	Bachi Singh Rawat	BJP	225,742	44.68	Renuka Rawat	INC	215,690	42.69	10,052	1.99
4	Nainital	K. C. Singh Baba	INC	275,658	44.70	Vijay Bansal	BJP	226,474	36.73	49,184	7.98
5	Hardwar (SC)	Rajendra Kumar Badi	SP	157,331	32.35	Dr. Bhagwandass	BSP	119,672	24.61	37,659	7.74

== Assembly Segment wise lead ==
Party	Assembly segments	Position in Assembly (as of 2007 election)
Bharatiya Janata Party	40	35
Indian National Congress	22	21
Samajwadi Party	4	0
Bahujan Samaj Party	4	8
Others	0	6
Total	70	

== By-election ==
By-elections were held in 2007 for Tehri Garhwal constituency on the death of Elected MP Manabendra Shah and for Garhwal constituency as Elected MP B. C. Khanduri became the Chief Minister of Uttaranchal.

In the election for Tehri Garhwal constituency, Indian National Congress candidate Vijay Bahuguna defeated Manujendra Shah, son of Manabendra Shah by margin of over 22,000.

In the election for Garhwal constituency, Bharatiya Janata Party candidate Tejpal Singh Rawat defeated Satpal Maharaj.

== See also ==
- Elections in Uttarakhand
- Politics of Uttarakhand
- 2004 Indian general election
- 14th Lok Sabha
- List of members of the 14th Lok Sabha
