= 2009 Indian general election in Uttarakhand =

- 13 May 2009

5 seats
- Turnout: 53.43% (▲5.36%)
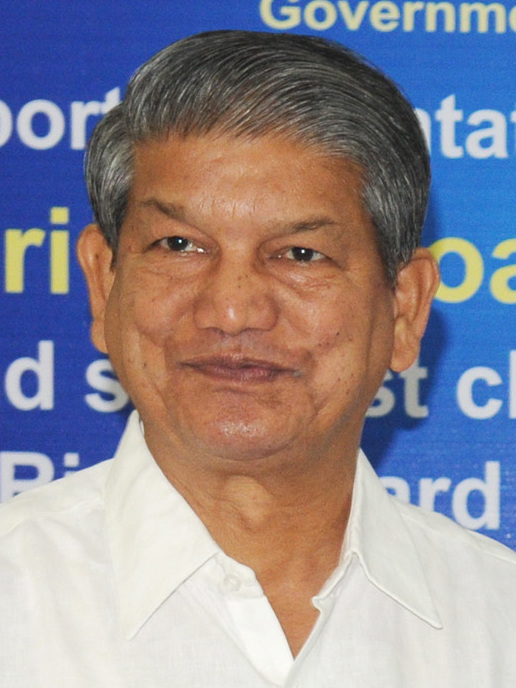

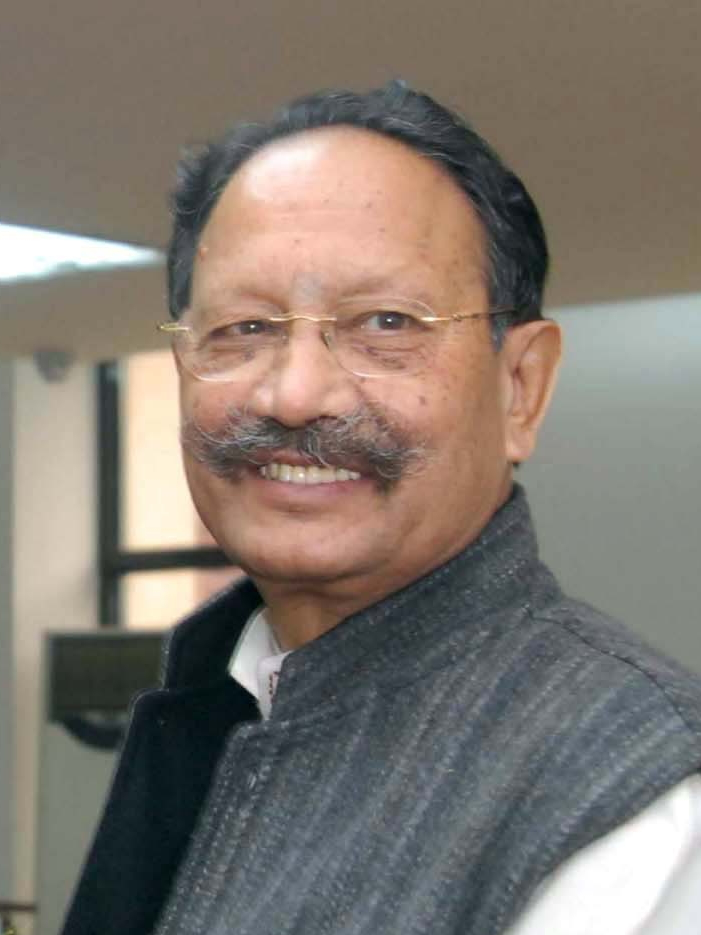
	First party	Second party
Leader	Harish Rawat	B.C. Khanduri
Party	INC	BJP
Alliance	UPA	NDA
Leader's seat	Haridwar	Did not contest
Last election	1	3
Seats won	5	0
Seat change	▲4	▼3
Popular vote	13,54,468	10,61,358
Percentage	43.14%	33.80%
Swing	▲4.83%	▼7.18%
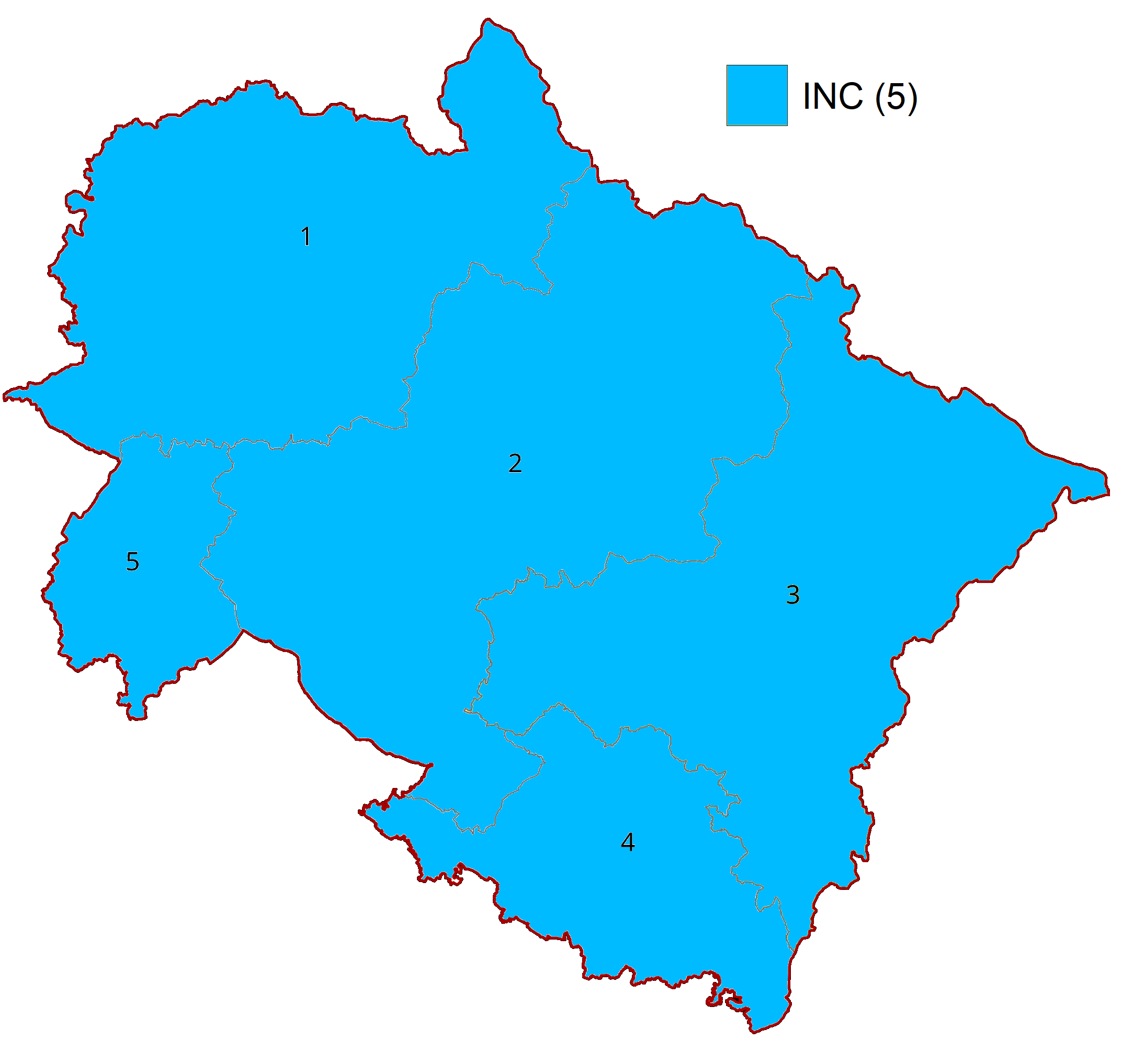
Prime Minister before election
Manmohan Singh
INC
Prime Minister after election
Manmohan Singh
INC

The 2009 Indian general election in Uttarakhand, occurred for 5 seats in the state. All 5 seats were won by the Indian National Congress.

== Parties and alliances ==
=== National Democratic Alliance ===
Party	Flag	Symbol	Leader	Seats contested
Bharatiya Janata Party			B. C. Khanduri	5

=== United Progressive Alliance ===
Party	Flag	Symbol	Leader	Seats contested
Indian National Congress			Harish Rawat	5

== Results ==
Party Name	Popular vote			Seats		
Party Name	Votes	%	±pp	Contested	Won	+/−
INC	13,54,468	43.14	▲4.83	5	5	▲4
BJP	10,61,358	33.80	▼7.18	5	0	▼3
BSP	4,78,394	15.24	▲8.47	5	0	Steady
SP	57,316	1.83	▼6.10	2	0	▼1
Others	1,02,383	3.25	Steady	30	0	Steady
IND	86,126	2.74	▼0.11	29	0	Steady
Total	31,40,045	100%	-	76	5	-

== Elected MPs ==
Following is the list of elected MPs from Uttarakhand.

Constituency		Winner				Runner Up				Margin	%
#	Name	Candidate	Party	Votes	%	Candidate	Party	Votes	%	Margin	%
1	Tehri Garhwal	Vijay Bahuguna	INC	263,083	45.04	Jaspal Rana	BJP	210,144	35.98	52,939	9.06
2	Garhwal	Satpal Maharaj	INC	236,949	44.41	Tejpal Singh Rawat	BJP	219,552	41.15	17,397	3.26
3	Almora	Pradeep Tamta	INC	200,824	41.77	Ajay Tamta	BJP	193,874	40.33	6,950	1.44
4	Nainital-Udhamsingh Nagar	K. C. Singh Baba	INC	321,377	42.64	Bachi Singh Rawat	BJP	232,965	30.91	88,412	11.73
5	Hardwar	Harish Rawat	INC	332,235	42.16	Swami Yatindranand Giri	BJP	204,823	25.99	127,412	16.17

== Post-election Union Council of Ministers from Uttarakhand ==
#	Name	Constituency	Designation	Department	From	To	Party
1	Harish Rawat	Hardwar	MoS	Labour and Employment	28 May 2009	19 January 2011	INC
1	Harish Rawat	Hardwar	MoS	Agriculture	19 January 2011	28 October 2012	INC
1	Harish Rawat	Hardwar	MoS	Food Processing Industries	19 January 2011	28 October 2012	INC
1	Harish Rawat	Hardwar	MoS	Parliamentary Affairs	12 July 2011	28 October 2012	INC
1	Harish Rawat	Hardwar	Cabinet Minister	Water Resources	28 October 2012	1 February 2014	INC

== Assembly segment wise lead ==
Party	Assembly segments	Position in Assembly (as of 2012 election)
Indian National Congress	51	32
Bharatiya Janata Party	19	31
Others	0	7
Total	70	

== By-election ==
By-elections were held in 2012 for Tehri Garhwal constituency as Elected MP Vijay Bahuguna became the Chief Minister of Uttarakhand.

In the election, Bharatiya Janata Party candidate Mala Rajya Laxmi Shah defeated Saket Bahuguna, son of Vijay Bahuguna by margin of over 22,000.

== See also ==
- Elections in Uttarakhand
- Politics of Uttarakhand
- 2009 Indian general election
- 15th Lok Sabha
- List of members of the 15th Lok Sabha
