= Painuli =

Brahmin community mainly from Uttarakhand, India

Painuly (पैन्यूली) is a Brahmin community primarily from the Indian state of Uttarakhand. Painuly are Gaur Brahmins, and their gotra is Bharadwaj.

Maa Rajarajeshwari or Maa Jagdamba Semwali Bhagwati in bhilang region of Tehri Garhwal is the Kul/Isth Devi and Batuk Bhairav/Batuknath is the Kul/Isth Devata or the family deities of the Painuly.

Painuly group is also known as 'Lekhwar' clan because these people did all the reading/writing and accounting work for the King of Garhwal apart from being their priests.

Some majar villages of painuly' s are Paniyala, likhwar gaon in Pratap nagar & Chandla,Laini, bhaatgaon in Ghansali.

== Notable people ==
- Paripoornanand Painuli (19 November 1924 – 13 April 2019) was an Indian Member of Parliament (5th Lok Sabha), social activist, and journalist with The Times of India. He represented the Tehri Garhwal Lok Sabha constituency and was a member of the Congress political party.
