= 2014 Indian general election in Uttarakhand =

- 7 May 2014

5 seats
- Turnout: 61.67% (▲8.24%)
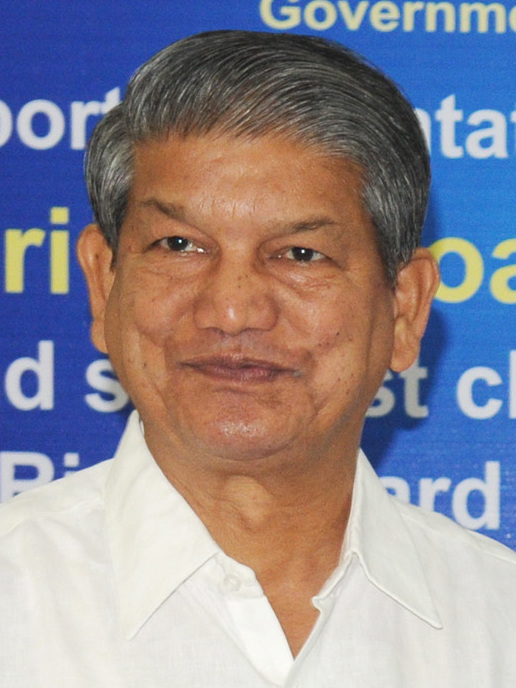
	First party	Second party
Leader	Bhagat Singh Koshyari	Harish Rawat
Party	BJP	INC
Alliance	NDA	UPA
Leader's seat	Nainital–Udhamsingh Nagar	Did not Contest
Last election	0	5
Seats won	5	0
Seat change	▲5	▼5
Popular vote	24,29,698	14,94,440
Percentage	55.90%	34.4%
Swing	▲22.1%	▼8.74%
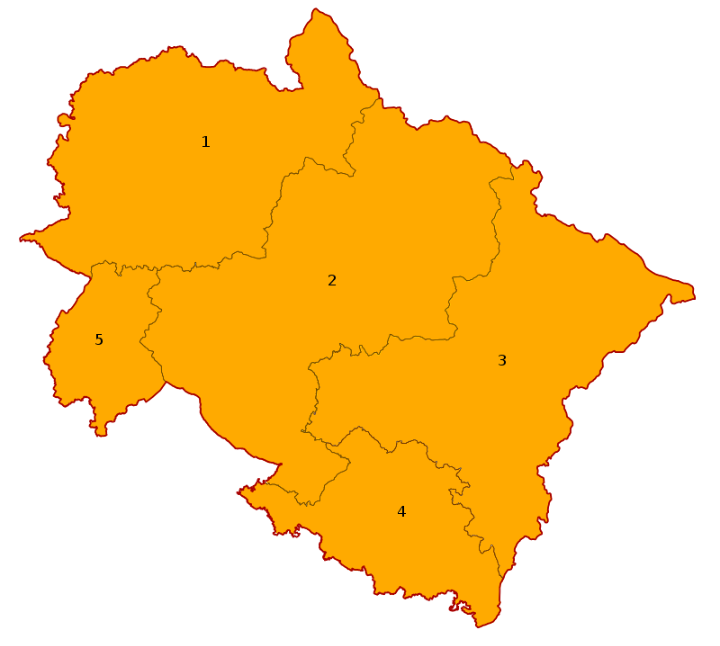
- Constituencies of the Lok Sabha in Uttarakhand
Prime Minister before election
Manmohan Singh
INC
Prime Minister after election
Narendra Modi
BJP

The 2014 Indian general election in Uttarakhand, occurred for 5 seats in the state. All 5 seats were won by the Bharatiya Janata Party.

== Parties and alliances ==
=== National Democratic Alliance ===
Party	Flag	Symbol	Leader	Seats contested
Bharatiya Janata Party			Bhagat Singh Koshyari	5

=== United Progressive Alliance ===
Party	Flag	Symbol	Leader	Seats contested
Indian National Congress			Harish Rawat	5

== Opinion polls ==
When conducted	Ref	Polling organisation/agency	Sample size		
When conducted	Ref	Polling organisation/agency	Sample size	INC	BJP
Aug–Oct 2013		Times Now-India TV-CVoter	24,284	0	5
Jan–Feb 2014		Times Now-India TV-CVoter	14,000	0	5

== Results ==
The results of the elections were declared on 16 May 2014.

=== Results by Party ===
Party Name	Popular vote			Seats		
Party Name	Votes	%	±pp	Contested	Won	+/−
BJP	24,29,698	55.32	▲21.52	5	5	▲5
INC	14,94,440	34.03	▼9.11	5	0	▼5
Others	3,43,551	7.82	Steady	37	0	Steady
IND	76,158	1.73	▼1.01	27	0	Steady
NOTA	48,043	1.09	Steady			
Total	43,91,890	100%	-	73	5	-

=== Elected MPs ===
Following is the list of elected MPs from Uttarakhand.

Constituency		Winner				Runner-up				Margin	
Constituency		Candidate	Party	Votes	%	Candidate	Party	Votes	%	Votes	%
1	Tehri Garhwal	Mala Rajya Laxmi Shah	BJP	446,733	57.50	Saket Bahuguna	INC	254,230	32.72	192,503	24.78
2	Garhwal	B. C. Khanduri	BJP	405,690	59.31	Harak Singh Rawat	INC	221,164	32.33	184,526	26.98
3	Almora	Ajay Tamta	BJP	348,186	53.00	Pradeep Tamta	INC	252,496	38.44	95,690	14.56
4	Nainital-Udhamsingh Nagar	Bhagat Singh Koshyari	BJP	636,769	57.79	K. C. Singh Baba	INC	352,052	31.95	284,717	25.84
5	Hardwar	Ramesh Pokhriyal	BJP	592,320	50.38	Renuka Rawat	INC	414,498	35.25	177,822	15.13

== Assembly Segment-wise lead ==
Party	Assembly segments	Position in Assembly (as of 2017 election)
Bharatiya Janata Party	63	57
Indian National Congress	7	11
Others	0	2
Total	70	

== See also ==
- Elections in Uttarakhand
- Politics of Uttarakhand
- 2014 Indian general election
- 16th Lok Sabha
- List of members of the 16th Lok Sabha
