= UPCC =

UPCC may refer to:

- Uttar Pradesh Congress Committee
- Uttarakhand Pradesh Congress Committee
