= 2019 Indian general election in Uttarakhand =

Indian lower house election in UK state

- 11 April 2019

5 seats
- Turnout: 61.88% (▲0.21%)
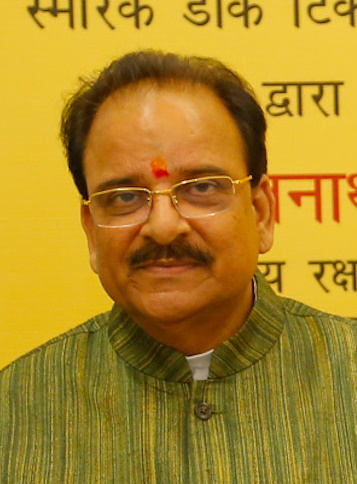

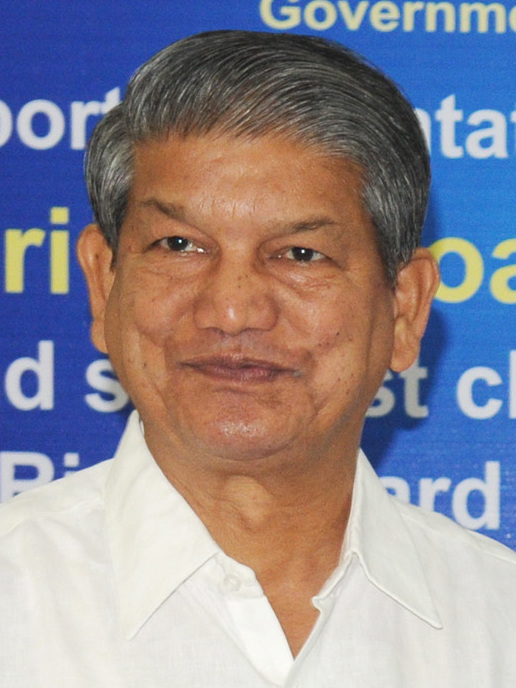
	First party	Second party
Leader	Ajay Bhatt	Harish Rawat
Party	BJP	INC
Alliance	NDA	UPA
Leader's seat	Nainital–Udhamsingh Nagar (won)	Nainital–Udhamsingh Nagar (lost)
Last election	5	0
Seats won	5	0
Seat change	Steady	Steady
Popular vote	29,54,833	15,20,767
Percentage	61.01%	31.40%
Swing	▲5.11%	▼3%
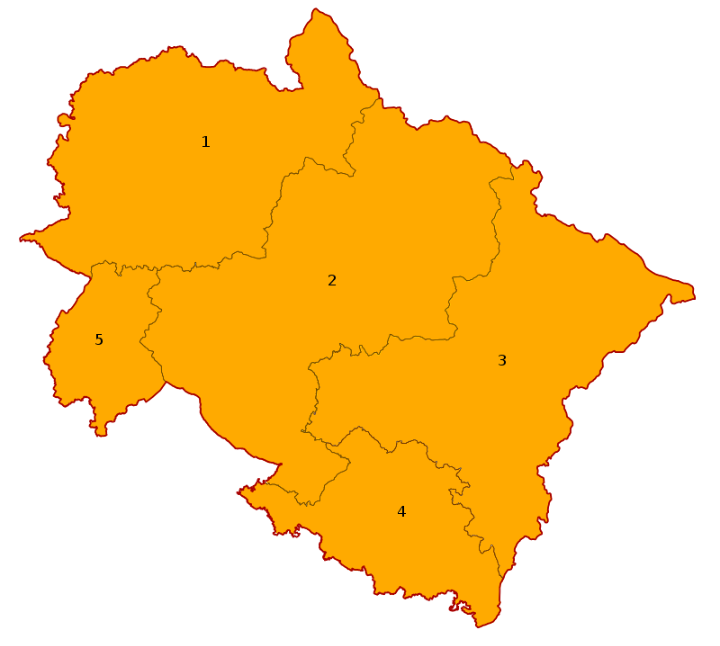
- Constituencies of the Lok Sabha in Uttarakhand
Prime Minister before election
Narendra Modi
BJP
Prime Minister after election
Narendra Modi
BJP

The 2019 Indian general election were held for the 5 Lok Sabha seats in Uttarakhand on 11 April 2019 to constitute the 17th Lok Sabha. All of the 5 seats were won by the Bharatiya Janata Party.

== Parties and alliances ==
=== National Democratic Alliance ===
Party	Flag	Symbol	Leader	Seats contested
Bharatiya Janata Party			Ajay Bhatt	5

=== United Progressive Alliance ===
Party	Flag	Symbol	Leader	Seats contested
Indian National Congress			Harish Rawat	5

== Candidates ==
Constituency					
Constituency		NDA		UPA	
1	Tehri Garhwal	BJP	Mala Rajya Laxmi Shah	INC	Pritam Singh
2	Garhwal	BJP	Tirath Singh Rawat	INC	Manish Khanduri
3	Almora (SC)	BJP	Ajay Tamta	INC	Pradeep Tamta
4	Nainital–Udhamsingh Nagar	BJP	Ajay Bhatt	INC	Harish Rawat
5	Haridwar	BJP	Ramesh Pokhriyal	INC	Ambrish Kumar

== Opinion polls ==
Date published	Polling agency			Lead
Date published	Polling agency	NDA	UPA	Lead
Jan 2019	India TV-CNX	4	1	3

== Results ==
=== Party wise ===
Party	BJP	INC	BSP
Votes	61.01%, 29,54,833	31.40%, 15,20,767	4.48%, 2,16,755
Seats	5 (100%)	0 (0.00%)	0 (0.00%)
Seats	5 / 5	0 / 5	0 / 5

=== Detailed Results ===
Party Name	Popular vote			Seats		
Party Name	Votes	%	±pp	Contested	Won	+/−
BJP	29,54,833	61.01	▲5.69	5	5	Steady
INC	15,20,767	31.40	▼2.63	5	0	Steady
BSP	2,16,755	4.48		4	0	Steady
Others	51,621	1.07	Steady	21	0	Steady
IND	48,003	0.99	▼0.74	17	0	Steady
NOTA	50,946	1.05	▼0.04			
Total	48,42,925	100%	-	52	5	-

=== Constituency wise ===
Constituency		Winner''				Runner-up				Margin	
Constituency		Candidate	Party	Votes	%	Candidate	Party	Votes	%	Votes	%
1	Tehri Garhwal	Mala Rajya Laxmi Shah	BJP	565,333	64.30	Pritam Singh	INC	264,747	30.11	300,586	34.19
2	Garhwal	Tirath Singh Rawat	BJP	506,980	67.78	Manish Khanduri	INC	204,311	27.31	302,669	40.47
3	Almora	Ajay Tamta	BJP	444,651	63.54	Pradeep Tamta	INC	211,665	30.25	232,986	33.29
4	Nainital-Udhamsingh Nagar	Ajay Bhatt	BJP	772,195	61.24	Harish Rawat	INC	433,099	34.35	339,096	26.89
5	Hardwar	Ramesh Pokhriyal 'Nishank'	BJP	665,674	52.28	Ambrish Kumar	INC	406,945	31.96	258,729	20.32

== Post-election Union Council of Ministers from Uttarakhand ==
#	Name	Constituency	Designation	Department	From	To	Party
1	Ramesh Pokhriyal 'Nishank'	Hardwar	Cabinet Minister	Minister of Human Resource Development (Renamed as Ministry of Education)	31 May 2019	7 July 2021 (Resigned)	BJP
2	Ajay Bhatt	Nainital-udhamsingh Nagar	MoS	MoS in the Ministry of Defence; MoS in the Ministry of Tourism	7 July 2021	9 June 2024	BJP

== Assembly segments wise lead of parties ==
2019 Uttarakhand Lok Sabha Elections Assembly Wise Map

Party	Assembly segments	Position in Assembly (as of 2022 election)
Bharatiya Janata Party	65	47
Indian National Congress	5	19
Bahujan Samaj Party	0	2
Others	–	2
Total	70	

== See also ==
- Elections in Uttarakhand
- Politics of Uttarakhand
- 2019 Indian general election
- 17th Lok Sabha
- List of members of the 17th Lok Sabha
