= 2024 Indian general election in Uttarakhand =

2024 Indian general elections in Uttarakhand

- 19 April 2024

All 5 Uttarakhand seats in the Lok Sabha
- Opinion polls
- Turnout: 57.69% (▼4.19%)
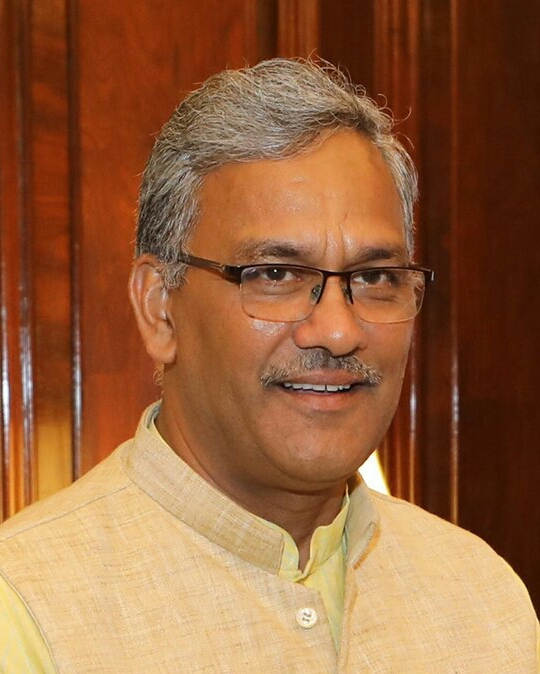

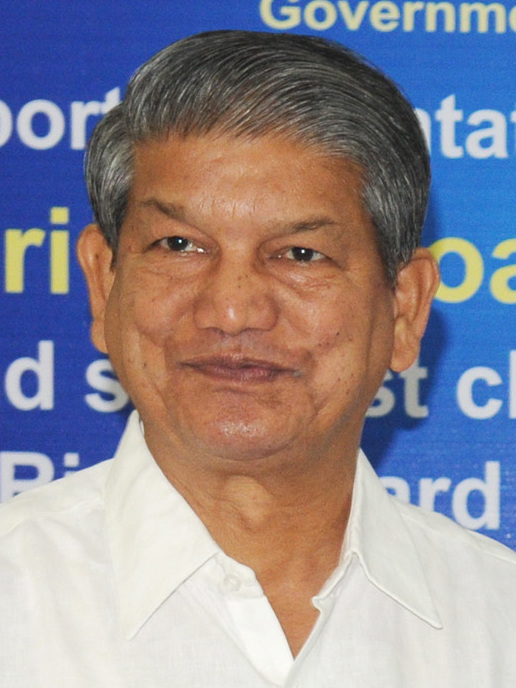
| | First party | Second party |
|---|---|---|
| Leader | Trivendra Singh Rawat | Harish Rawat |
| Party | BJP | INC |
| Alliance | NDA | INDIA |
| Leader since | 2021 | 2014 |
| Leader's seat | Haridwar | Not Contesting |
| Last election | 61.01%, 5 seats | 31.40%, 0 seat |
| Seats won | 5 | 0 |
| Seat change | Steady | Steady |
| Popular vote | 27,06,910 | 15,64,258 |
| Percentage | 56.81% | 32.83% |
| Swing | ▼4.20 pp | ▲1.43 pp |
- Seatwise Result Map of the 2024 general election in Uttarakhand
Prime Minister before election
Narendra Modi
BJP
Prime Minister after election
Narendra Modi
BJP

The 2024 Indian general election was held in Uttarakhand on 19 April 2024 to elect 5 members of the 18th Lok Sabha. The result of the election was announced on 4 June 2024

== Election schedule ==
The election schedule was announced by the Election Commission of India on 16 March 2024.

| Poll event | Phase |
|---|---|
| Poll event | I |
| Notification date | 20 March |
| Last date for filing nomination | 27 March |
| Scrutiny of nomination | 28 March |
| Last Date for withdrawal of nomination | 30 March |
| Date of poll | 19 April |
| Date of counting of votes/Result | 4 June 2024 |
| No. of constituencies | 5 |

== Parties and alliances ==
=== National Democratic Alliance ===
National Democratic Alliance

| Party | Flag | Symbol | Leader | Seats contested |
|---|---|---|---|---|
| Bharatiya Janata Party | | | Trivendra Singh Rawat | 5 |

=== Indian National Developmental Inclusive Alliance ===
Indian National Developmental Inclusive Alliance

| Party | Flag | Symbol | Leader | Seats contested |
|---|---|---|---|---|
| Indian National Congress | | | Karan Mahara | 5 |

=== Others ===
| Party | Symbol | Seats contested |
|---|---|---|
| Bahujan Samaj Party | | 5 |
| Peoples Party of India (Democratic) | | 5 |
| Uttarakhand Kranti Dal | | 3 |
| Bahujan Mukti Party | | 2 |
| Akhil Bharatiya Parivar Party | | 2 |
| Bharatiya Rashtriya Ekta Dal | | 2 |
| Uttarakhand Samanta Party | | 2 |
| Bharatiya Shakti Chetna Party | | 1 |
| Bharat Ki Lok Jimmedar Party | | 1 |
| Rashtriya Uttarakhand Party | | 1 |
| Sainik Samaj Party | | 1 |
| Socialist Unity Centre of India (Communist) | | 1 |
| Uttarakhand Parivartan Party | | 1 |
| Total | | 27 |

== Candidates ==
| Constituency | | | | | |
| Constituency | | NDA | | INDIA | |
| 1 | Tehri Garhwal | BJP | Mala Rajya Laxmi Shah | INC | Jot Singh Gunsola |
| 2 | Garhwal | BJP | Anil Baluni | INC | Ganesh Godiyal |
| 3 | Almora (SC) | BJP | Ajay Tamta | INC | Pradeep Tamta |
| 4 | Nainital–Udhamsingh Nagar | BJP | Ajay Bhatt | INC | Prakash Joshi |
| 5 | Haridwar | BJP | Trivendra Singh Rawat | INC | Virendra Rawat |

== Voter turnout ==
| Constituency | | Poll date | Turnout | Swing |
|---|---|---|---|---|
| 1 | Tehri Garhwal | 19 April 2024 | 53.76% | ▼5.11% |
| 2 | Garhwal | 19 April 2024 | 52.42% | ▼2.75% |
| 3 | Almora (SC) | 19 April 2024 | 48.74% | ▼3.57% |
| 4 | Nainital–Udhamsingh Nagar | 19 April 2024 | 62.47% | ▼6.75% |
| 5 | Haridwar | 19 April 2024 | 63.53% | ▼5.72% |
| | | | 57.22% | ▼4.66% |

== Surveys and polls ==
=== Opinion polls ===
| Polling agency | Date published | Margin of error | | | | Lead |
| Polling agency | Date published | Margin of error | NDA | INDIA | Others | Lead |
| ABP News-CVoter | March 2024 | ±5% | 5 | 0 | 0 | NDA |
| India Today-CVoter | February 2024 | ±3-5% | 5 | 0 | 0 | NDA |
| Times Now-ETG | December 2023 | ±3% | 4-5 | 0-1 | 0 | NDA |
| India TV-CNX | October 2023 | ±3% | 5 | 0 | 0 | NDA |
| Times Now-ETG | September 2023 | ±3% | 4-5 | 0-1 | 0 | NDA |
| Times Now-ETG | August 2023 | ±3% | 4-5 | 0-1 | 0 | NDA |

| Polling agency | Date published | Margin of error | | | | Lead |
| Polling agency | Date published | Margin of error | NDA | INDIA | Others | Lead |
| ABP News-CVoter | March 2024 | ±5% | 63% | 35% | 2% | 28 |
| India Today-CVoter | February 2024 | ±3-5% | 59% | 32% | 9% | 27 |

=== Exit polls ===
| Polling agency | | | | Lead |
| Polling agency | NDA | INDIA | Others | Lead |
| TV9 Bharatvarsh- People's Insight - Polstrat | 5 | 0 | 0 | NDA |
| Actual results | 5 | 0 | 0 | NDA |

== Results ==
=== Results by alliance or party ===
| Alliance/ Party | | Popular vote | | | Seats | | |
| Alliance/ Party | | Votes | % | ±pp | Contested | Won | +/− |
|---|---|---|---|---|---|---|---|
| NDA | BJP | 27,06,910 | 56.81 | ▼4.20 | 5 | 5 | Steady |
| INDIA | INC | 15,64,258 | 32.83 | ▲1.43 | 5 | 0 | Steady |
| BSP | | 86,246 | 1.81 | ▼2.67 | 5 | 0 | Steady |
| UKD | | 9,270 | 0.19 | ▼0.01 | 3 | 0 | Steady |
| Others | | 48,602 | 0.85 | ▼1.01 | 19 | 0 | Steady |
| IND | | 297,572 | 6.42 | ▲6.31 | 18 | 0 | Steady |
| NOTA | | 52,115 | 1.09 | ▲0.15 | | | |
| Total | | 47,64,973 | 100% | - | 55 | 5 | - |

=== Results by constituency ===
| Constituency | | Turnout | Winner | | | | Runner-up | | | | Margin |
| Constituency | | Turnout | Candidate | Party | Votes | % | Candidate | Party | Votes | % | Margin |
|---|---|---|---|---|---|---|---|---|---|---|---|
| 1 | Tehri Garhwal | 54.50 ▼ | Mala Rajya Laxmi Shah | BJP | 4,62,603 | 53.66 | Jot Singh Gunsola | INC | 1,90,110 | 22.05 | 2,72,493 |
| 2 | Garhwal | 53.14 ▼ | Anil Baluni | BJP | 4,32,159 | 58.6 | Ganesh Godiyal | INC | 2,68,656 | 36.43 | 1,63,503 |
| 3 | Almora (SC) | 49.33 ▼ | Ajay Tamta | BJP | 4,29,167 | 64.2 | Pradeep Tamta | INC | 1,95,070 | 29.18 | 2,34,097 |
| 4 | Nainital–Udhamsingh Nagar | 62.75 ▼ | Ajay Bhatt | BJP | 7,72,671 | 61.03 | Prakash Joshi | INC | 4,38,123 | 34.61 | 3,34,548 |
| 5 | Haridwar | 63.90 ▼ | Trivendra Singh Rawat | BJP | 6,53,808 | 50.19 | Virendra Rawat | INC | 4,89,752 | 37.6 | 1,64,056 |

== Assembly wise lead of Parties ==
=== Partywise wise leads ===
2024 Uttarakhand Lok Sabha Election Assembly Wise Leads

| Party | Assembly segments | Position in Assembly (as of 2022 election) |
|---|---|---|
| Bharatiya Janata Party | 60 | 47 |
| Indian National Congress | 7 | 19 |
| Bahujan Samaj Party | 0 | 2 |
| Independent | 3 | 2 |
| Total | 70 | |

=== Assembly wise leads ===
| Constituency | | Winner | | | | Runner-up | | | | Margin |
| # | Name | Candidate | Party | Votes | % | Candidate | Party | Votes | % | Margin |
Tehri Garhwal Lok Sabha constituency
| 1 | Purola (SC) | Bobby Panwar | IND | 25,647 | 55.01 | Mala Rajya Laxmi Shah | BJP | 13,536 | 29.03 | 12,111 |
| 2 | Yamunotri | Bobby Panwar | IND | 21,602 | 50.39 | Mala Rajya Laxmi Shah | BJP | 14,804 | 34.54 | 6,798 |
| 3 | Gangotri | Mala Rajya Laxmi Shah | BJP | 20,513 | 43.00 | Bobby Panwar | IND | 19,131 | 40.10 | 1,382 |
| 9 | Ghansali (SC) | Mala Rajya Laxmi Shah | BJP | 21,727 | 54.46 | Bobby Panwar | IND | 8,173 | 20.48 | 13,554 |
| 12 | Pratapnagar | Mala Rajya Laxmi Shah | BJP | 17,043 | 51.18 | Jot Singh Gunsola | INC | 7,538 | 22.64 | 9,505 |
| 13 | Tehri | Mala Rajya Laxmi Shah | BJP | 18,050 | 50.14 | Bobby Panwar | IND | 10,838 | 30.11 | 7,212 |
| 14 | Dhanaulti | Mala Rajya Laxmi Shah | BJP | 18,366 | 42.20 | Bobby Panwar | IND | 17,879 | 41.08 | 487 |
| 15 | Chakrata (ST) | Bobby Panwar | IND | 26,983 | 47.82 | Mala Rajya Laxmi Shah | BJP | 14,640 | 25.94 | 12,343 |
| 16 | Vikasnagar | Mala Rajya Laxmi Shah | BJP | 44,541 | 58.56 | Jot Singh Gunsola | INC | 25,342 | 33.31 | 19,199 |
| 17 | Sahaspur | Mala Rajya Laxmi Shah | BJP | 72,125 | 60.53 | Jot Singh Gunsola | INC | 38,215 | 32.07 | 33,910 |
| 19 | Raipur | Mala Rajya Laxmi Shah | BJP | 65,407 | 64.74 | Jot Singh Gunsola | INC | 24,710 | 24.46 | 40,697 |
| 20 | Rajpur Road (SC) | Mala Rajya Laxmi Shah | BJP | 40,178 | 65.95 | Jot Singh Gunsola | INC | 17,237 | 28.29 | 22,941 |
| 21 | Dehradun Cantonment | Mala Rajya Laxmi Shah | BJP | 49,270 | 70.02 | Jot Singh Gunsola | INC | 17,078 | 24.27 | 32,192 |
| 22 | Mussoorie | Mala Rajya Laxmi Shah | BJP | 45,749 | 62.72 | Jot Singh Gunsola | INC | 20,592 | 28.23 | 25,157 |
Garhwal Lok Sabha constituency
| 4 | Badrinath | Anil Baluni | BJP | 31,854 | 54.87 | Ganesh Godiyal | INC | 23,600 | 40.65 | 8,254 |
| 5 | Tharali (SC) | Anil Baluni | BJP | 31,398 | 57.02 | Ganesh Godiyal | INC | 20,192 | 36.67 | 11,206 |
| 6 | Karnaprayag | Anil Baluni | BJP | 32,215 | 61.98 | Ganesh Godiyal | INC | 17,019 | 32.74 | 15,196 |
| 7 | Kedarnath | Anil Baluni | BJP | 30,536 | 57.21 | Ganesh Godiyal | INC | 20,164 | 37.77 | 10,372 |
| 8 | Rudraprayag | Anil Baluni | BJP | 34,688 | 61.61 | Ganesh Godiyal | INC | 18,041 | 32.04 | 16,647 |
| 10 | Devprayag | Anil Baluni | BJP | 21,920 | 59.32 | Ganesh Godiyal | INC | 12,735 | 34.46 | 9,185 |
| 11 | Narendranagar | Anil Baluni | BJP | 31,147 | 69.21 | Ganesh Godiyal | INC | 11,570 | 25.71 | 19,577 |
| 36 | Yamkeshwar | Anil Baluni | BJP | 25,654 | 64.00 | Ganesh Godiyal | INC | 12,276 | 30.62 | 13,378 |
| 37 | Pauri (SC) | Anil Baluni | BJP | 22,707 | 51.11 | Ganesh Godiyal | INC | 19,499 | 43.89 | 3,208 |
| 38 | Srinagar | Anil Baluni | BJP | 28,484 | 48.42 | Ganesh Godiyal | INC | 27,786 | 47.23 | 698 |
| 39 | Chaubattakhal | Anil Baluni | BJP | 20,688 | 56.88 | Ganesh Godiyal | INC | 13,621 | 37.45 | 7,067 |
| 40 | Lansdowne | Anil Baluni | BJP | 21,237 | 63.53 | Ganesh Godiyal | INC | 10,301 | 30.81 | 10,936 |
| 41 | Kotdwar | Anil Baluni | BJP | 43,190 | 61.96 | Ganesh Godiyal | INC | 24,344 | 34.92 | 18,846 |
| 61 | Ramnagar | Anil Baluni | BJP | 42,813 | 55.61 | Ganesh Godiyal | INC | 31,544 | 40.97 | 11,269 |
Almora Lok Sabha constituency
| 42 | Dharchula | Ajay Tamta | BJP | 26,512 | 62.57 | Pradeep Tamta | INC | 13,415 | 31.66 | 13,097 |
| 43 | Didihat | Ajay Tamta | BJP | 25,910 | 66.00 | Pradeep Tamta | INC | 11,170 | 28.42 | 14,740 |
| 44 | Pithoragarh | Ajay Tamta | BJP | 34,336 | 63.40 | Pradeep Tamta | INC | 16,862 | 31.13 | 17,474 |
| 45 | Gangolihat (SC) | Ajay Tamta | BJP | 28,521 | 59.66 | Pradeep Tamta | INC | 15,840 | 33.13 | 12,681 |
| 46 | Kapkot | Ajay Tamta | BJP | 34,642 | 64.84 | Pradeep Tamta | INC | 15,080 | 28.23 | 19,562 |
| 47 | Bageshwar (SC) | Ajay Tamta | BJP | 41,056 | 63.29 | Pradeep Tamta | INC | 19,777 | 30.48 | 21,279 |
| 48 | Dwarahat | Ajay Tamta | BJP | 28,463 | 67.22 | Pradeep Tamta | INC | 10,312 | 24.35 | 18,151 |
| 49 | Salt | Ajay Tamta | BJP | 23,549 | 70.34 | Pradeep Tamta | INC | 7,450 | 22.25 | 16,099 |
| 50 | Ranikhet | Ajay Tamta | BJP | 20,612 | 59.39 | Pradeep Tamta | INC | 11,596 | 33.41 | 9,016 |
| 51 | Someshwar (SC) | Ajay Tamta | BJP | 24,664 | 56.57 | Pradeep Tamta | INC | 15,413 | 35.35 | 9,251 |
| 52 | Almora | Ajay Tamta | BJP | 27,099 | 57.65 | Pradeep Tamta | INC | 17,148 | 36.48 | 9,951 |
| 53 | Jageshwar | Ajay Tamta | BJP | 26,431 | 60.79 | Pradeep Tamta | INC | 13,417 | 30.86 | 13,014 |
| 54 | Lohaghat | Ajay Tamta | BJP | 36,206 | 71.77 | Pradeep Tamta | INC | 10,892 | 21.59 | 25,314 |
| 55 | Champawat | Ajay Tamta | BJP | 39,534 | 71.27 | Pradeep Tamta | INC | 13,270 | 23.92 | 26,264 |
Nainital–Udhamsingh Nagar Lok Sabha constituency
| 56 | Lalkuan | Ajay Bhatt | BJP | 54,351 | 70.21 | Prakash Joshi | INC | 20,128 | 26.00 | 34,223 |
| 57 | Bhimtal | Ajay Bhatt | BJP | 40,541 | 69.51 | Prakash Joshi | INC | 13,636 | 23.38 | 26,905 |
| 58 | Nainital (SC) | Ajay Bhatt | BJP | 34,589 | 60.47 | Prakash Joshi | INC | 19,424 | 33.96 | 15,165 |
| 59 | Haldwani | Ajay Bhatt | BJP | 45,273 | 48.95 | Prakash Joshi | INC | 44,761 | 48.39 | 512 |
| 60 | Kaladhungi | Ajay Bhatt | BJP | 81,241 | 73.92 | Prakash Joshi | INC | 24,830 | 22.59 | 56,411 |
| 62 | Jaspur | Prakash Joshi | INC | 42,931 | 48.86 | Ajay Bhatt | BJP | 39,663 | 45.14 | 3,268 |
| 63 | Kashipur | Ajay Bhatt | BJP | 60,312 | 60.10 | Prakash Joshi | INC | 34,802 | 34.68 | 25,510 |
| 64 | Bajpur (SC) | Ajay Bhatt | BJP | 50,115 | 50.17 | Prakash Joshi | INC | 44,171 | 44.22 | 5,944 |
| 65 | Gadarpur | Ajay Bhatt | BJP | 63,563 | 61.90 | Prakash Joshi | INC | 35,537 | 34.61 | 28,026 |
| 66 | Rudrapur | Ajay Bhatt | BJP | 92,106 | 74.05 | Prakash Joshi | INC | 28,242 | 22.70 | 63,864 |
| 67 | Kichha | Ajay Bhatt | BJP | 48,781 | 52.86 | Prakash Joshi | INC | 40,405 | 43.78 | 8,376 |
| 68 | Sitarganj | Ajay Bhatt | BJP | 59,612 | 65.13 | Prakash Joshi | INC | 28,316 | 30.93 | 31,296 |
| 69 | Nanakmatta (ST) | Ajay Bhatt | BJP | 45,697 | 55.73 | Prakash Joshi | INC | 32,087 | 39.13 | 13,610 |
| 70 | Khatima | Ajay Bhatt | BJP | 50,553 | 63.45 | Prakash Joshi | INC | 25,646 | 32.19 | 24,907 |
Haridwar Lok Sabha constituency
| 18 | Dharampur | Trivendra Singh Rawat | BJP | 69,803 | 62.35 | Virendra Rawat | INC | 38,292 | 34.20 | 31,511 |
| 23 | Doiwala | Trivendra Singh Rawat | BJP | 74,693 | 70.28 | Virendra Rawat | INC | 25,132 | 23.65 | 49,561 |
| 24 | Rishikesh | Trivendra Singh Rawat | BJP | 67,383 | 73.31 | Virendra Rawat | INC | 15,133 | 16.46 | 52,250 |
| 25 | Haridwar | Trivendra Singh Rawat | BJP | 60,936 | 70.96 | Virendra Rawat | INC | 18,988 | 22.11 | 41,948 |
| 26 | BHEL Ranipur | Trivendra Singh Rawat | BJP | 62,739 | 58.56 | Virendra Rawat | INC | 34,019 | 31.75 | 28,720 |
| 27 | Jwalapur (SC) | Virendra Rawat | INC | 42,979 | 48.34 | Trivendra Singh Rawat | BJP | 33,369 | 37.53 | 9,610 |
| 28 | Bhagwanpur (SC) | Virendra Rawat | INC | 44,209 | 47.97 | Trivendra Singh Rawat | BJP | 34,646 | 37.59 | 9,563 |
| 29 | Jhabrera (SC) | Virendra Rawat | INC | 35,896 | 41.36 | Trivendra Singh Rawat | BJP | 31,632 | 36.45 | 4,264 |
| 30 | Piran Kaliyar | Virendra Rawat | INC | 49,179 | 52.60 | Trivendra Singh Rawat | BJP | 30,989 | 33.14 | 18,190 |
| 31 | Roorkee | Trivendra Singh Rawat | BJP | 37,035 | 52.53 | Virendra Rawat | INC | 26,841 | 38.07 | 10,194 |
| 32 | Khanpur | Trivendra Singh Rawat | BJP | 46,252 | 44.10 | Virendra Rawat | INC | 36,755 | 35.05 | 9,497 |
| 33 | Manglaur | Virendra Rawat | INC | 44,101 | 57.37 | Trivendra Singh Rawat | BJP | 21,100 | 27.45 | 23,001 |
| 34 | Laksar | Virendra Rawat | INC | 33,407 | 44.28 | Trivendra Singh Rawat | BJP | 30,595 | 40.55 | 2,812 |
| 35 | Haridwar Rural | Trivendra Singh Rawat | BJP | 47,326 | 46.97 | Virendra Rawat | INC | 42,475 | 42.15 | 4,851 |

== See also ==
- 2024 Indian general election in Haryana
- 2024 Indian general election in Andaman and Nicobar Islands
- 2024 Indian general election in Himachal Pradesh
