= Paripoornanand Painuli =

Indian politician (1924–2019)

Paripoornanand Painuli (19 November 1924 – 12 April 2019) was an Indian politician and a member of the 5th Lok Sabha. He represented the Tehri Garhwal Lok Sabha Constituency and was a member of the Congress political party.

== Position held ==
Year	Description
1971	Elected to 5th Lok Sabha
