= Diwan Singh Bisht =

Indian politician

Member of the Uttarakhand Legislative Assembly
- Incumbent
- Assumed office 11 March 2017
- Preceded by: Amrita Rawat
- Constituency: Ramnagar
- In office 2007–2012
- Preceded by: N.D. Tiwari
- Succeeded by: Amrita Rawat

Personal details
- Born: 8 June 1954 (age 71)
- Party: Bharatiya Janata Party
- Profession: Politician

Diwan Singh Bisht is an Indian politician. He is a three-term Member of the Uttarakhand Legislative Assembly. Bisht represents the Ramnagar assembly constituency in Uttarakhand as a member of the Bhartiya Janata Party.
