= Uttarakhand Kranti Dal =

Regional political party of Uttarakhand

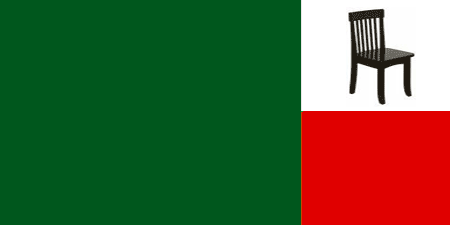
- Abbreviation: UKD
- Leader: Surendra Kukreti
- President: Surendra Kukreti
- Founder: Devi Datt Pant; Indramani Badoni; Kashi Singh Airy; Diwakar Bhatt; Surendra Kukreti
- Founded: 26 July 1979 (47 years ago)
- Headquarters: Kranti Bhavan, 10 Court Road, Dehradun-248001, Uttarakhand
- Ideology: Regionalism; Protectionism; Civic nationalism Democratic socialism Secularism
- Political position: Center-left
- Colours: Myrtle green
- ECI status: Registered Unrecognised Party
- Seats in Rajya Sabha: 0 / 3
- Seats in Lok Sabha: 0 / 5
- Seats in Uttarakhand Legislative Assembly: 0 / 70

Election symbol

Website
- ourukd.in

The Uttarakhand Kranti Dal (translation: Uttarakhand Revolutionary Party; abbr. UKD), is a registered unrecognised regional political party in Uttarakhand, India. Founded in 1979, the party was built upon the aim of establishing a separate hill-state to combat administrative neglect and ensure sustainable development with respect to the sensitive ecology of the Himalayan region. Through the 80s and late 90s UKD became the principal leader of the Uttarakhand Statehood Movement and is credited by for bringing about the separation and creation of Uttarakhand as the 27th state of India on 9 November 2000.

In the present Uttarakhand Legislative Assembly, elected in 2022, it did not have any member as compared with one member in the previous 2012, three members in 2007 and four members in 2002 assembly elections of the state.

== History ==
The UKD was established after an extended period of non-unified civil activism movements across Uttar the hilly districts of Uttar Pradesh on 26 July 1979 by Bipin Chandra Tripathi, Prof. Devi Datt Pant, Indramani Badoni and Kashi Singh Airy at Nanital. The party was formed under the leadership of some of the major political forces within the region and aimed at promoting unified activism to struggle for a separate state composed of the hill districts of Uttar Pradesh.

The founding convention was chaired by Prof. Devi Datt Pant, former vice-chancellor of Kumaon University. Under the young leadership of Kashi Singh Airy who took the charge of struggle and public agitations.

In 1988, Badoni did a 105-day foot march under the banner of Uttarakhand Kranti Dal. This procession ran from Tawaghat in Pithoragarh to Dehradun. He went from door to door in the village and told the people the benefits of a separate state. In 1992, he declared Gairsain the capital of Uttarakhand on the day of Makar Sankranti in Bageshwar.

The Uttarakhand Movement soon bore fruition after various cases of police administrative and police brutality in the later half of the movement, when the separate Uttaranchal state was formed on 9 November 2000 by the then BJP lead government. The change in state name to "Uttaranchal" garnered widespread criticism from UKD representatives and civilian activists for being an attempt at diluting the sacrifice of regional groups like the UKD.

However, in the first-ever state assembly elections in 2002, the party won only four out of 70 seats and was outmaneuvered by the Indian National Congress and Bharatiya Janata Party, both despite being latecomers to the Uttarakhand statehood movement, succeeded in capturing its momentum for electoral gain and formed governments in the state.

== Leadership ==
The party's current Central President is Surendra Kukreti, who was elected to the position in November 2025. He succeeded Pooran Singh Kathait, who had served as the central President since 2023. Under his leadership, Uttarakhand Kranti Dal is fighting for the causes of natives of Uttarakhand. There are various other leaders like Sh. Kashi Singh Airy, a prominent leader of the Uttarakhand statehood movement and a senior leader of Uttarakhand Kranti Dal, who was elected for Uttar Pradesh Legislative Assembly three times (1985–1989, 1989–1991, 1993–1996) from Didihat and was elected for first Uttarakhand Legislative Assembly. The executive president of the party is Harish Chandra Pathak—senior statehood activist and prominent face of Uttarakhand statehood movement who fought from the forefront in the creation of Uttarakhand state. Jaswant Singh Bisht was the first elected MLA of the party from Ranikhet constituency. Other personalities include Indramani Badoni, Devi Datt Pant, Bipin Chandra Tripathi and Diwakar Bhatt who were among the founding members and long time agitators for the Uttarakhand statehood movement.

== Factionalism and decline ==
In the 2012 Uttarakhand Assembly election, Uttarakhand Kranti Dal contested as Uttarakhand Kranti Dal (P) led by then party president Trivendra Singh Panwar. The original party name and the election symbol (chair) was frozen by the Election Commission of India following the factionalism and leadership dispute within the party that led to its breakup. The splinter group Uttarakhand Kranti Dal (D) led by former MLA and Cabinet Minister in the Khanduri government and later Pokhriyal government, Diwakar Bhatt broke away from the UKD with his supporters claiming the original party leadership. Pritam Singh Panwar was the only winning candidate of the party in the 2012 Assembly election, who ran under the UKD(P) banner.

Uttarakhand Kranti Dal's original name and party symbol were restored in 2017 with the merger of both groups.

The party's performance in various assembly and parliamentary elections has been on a consistent decline. The main reasons cited for UKD's decline in the politics of Uttarakhand are; inner factionalism, loss of voter base to other parties and frequent switching for power share between the BJP and Congress governments, which is often viewed negatively as political opportunism.

== Electoral performance ==
=== Uttar Pradesh ===
==== Legislative Assembly elections ====
Year	Legislature	Party leader	Seats won	Change in seats	Outcome
1980	8th Vidhan Sabha	Devi Datt Pant	0 / 425	New entry	–
1985	9th Vidhan Sabha	Indramani Badoni	0 / 425	Steady	–
1989	10th Vidhan Sabha	Bipin Chandra Tripathi	1 / 425	▲1	Opposition
1991	11th Vidhan Sabha	Bipin Chandra Tripathi	0 / 425	▼1	–
1993	12th Vidhan Sabha	Kashi Singh Airy	1 / 425	▲1	Opposition
1996	13th Vidhan Sabha	Kashi Singh Airy	0 / 425	▼1	–

==== Lok Sabha elections ====
Year	Legislature	Party leader	Seats won	Change in seats	Outcome
1980	7th Lok Sabha	Devi Datt Pant	0 / 85	New entry	–
1984	8th Lok Sabha	Indramani Badoni	0 / 85	Steady	–
1989	9th Lok Sabha	Bipin Chandra Tripathi	0 / 85	Steady	–
1991	10th Lok Sabha	Bipin Chandra Tripathi	0 / 85	Steady	–
1996	11th Lok Sabha	Kashi Singh Airy	0 / 85	Steady	–
1998	12th Lok Sabha	Kashi Singh Airy	0 / 85	Steady	–
1999	13th Lok Sabha	Kashi Singh Airy	0 / 85	Steady	–

=== Uttarakhand ===
==== Legislative Assembly elections ====
Year	Legislature	Party leader	Seats won	Change in seats	Outcome
2002	1st Vidhan Sabha	Bipin Chandra Tripathi	4 / 70	4	Opposition
2007	2nd Vidhan Sabha	Diwakar Bhatt	3 / 70	▼1	Government with BJP
2012	3rd Vidhan Sabha	Trivendra Singh Panwar	1 / 70	▼2	Government with INC
2017	4th Vidhan Sabha	Kashi Singh Airy	0 / 70	▼1	–
2022	5th Vidhan Sabha	Diwakar Bhatt	0 / 70	Steady	–

==== Lok Sabha elections ====
Year	Legislature	Party leader	Seats won	Change in seats	Outcome
2004	14th Lok Sabha	Bipin Chandra Tripathi	0 / 5	New entry	–
2009	15th Lok Sabha	Diwakar Bhatt	0 / 5	Steady	–
2014	16th Lok Sabha	Trivendra Singh Panwar	0 / 5	Steady	–
2019	17th Lok Sabha	Kashi Singh Airy	0 / 5	Steady	–
2024	18th Lok Sabha	Diwakar Bhatt	0 / 5	Steady	–

== Legacy ==
The party has taken on various campaigns in the past geared towards the social and economic upliftment of the Pahari people. The party has embraced a number of causes of concern to the diversity of people living in Uttarakhand, defining the Uttarakhandi identity in broad and inclusive terms. As such, its ideology of civic as opposed to ethnic nationalism can be compared to other centre-left nationalist parties like the Scottish National Party or the Plaid Cymru, although its orientation and goals are emphatically non-secessionist.

The party has been among the most active campaigners of the bhu Kanoon Movement and campaigned heavily to ensure judicial justice in the Ankita Bhandari Murder case.

== See also ==
- Revolutionary Party
- List of socialist parties
- Bharatiya Janata Party, Uttarakhand
- Uttarakhand Pradesh Congress Committee
- List of political parties in India
