= Ramnagar, Uttarakhand Assembly constituency =

Legislative assembly constituency in Uttarakhand, India

Coordinates: 29.39°N 79.13°E

Ramnagar
- Constituency No. 61 for the Uttarakhand Legislative Assembly

Constituency details
- Country: India
- Region: North India
- State: Uttarakhand
- District: Nainital
- Lok Sabha constituency: Garhwal
- Total electors: 121,868
- Reservation: None

Member of Legislative Assembly
- 5th Uttarakhand Legislative Assembly
- Incumbent Diwan Singh Bisht
- Party: Bharatiya Janata Party
- Elected year: 2022

Ramnagar Legislative Assembly constituency is one of the 70 Legislative Assembly constituencies of Uttarakhand state in India.

Ramnagar Legislative Assembly constituency, currently is a part of Garhwal (Lok Sabha constituency) as per the delimitation in 2008. Prior to the delimitation in 2008, it was a part of Nainital (Lok Sabha constituency).

It is part of Nainital district.

== Members of the Legislative Assembly ==
Election	Member	Party
2002	Yogambar Singh Rawat	Indian National Congress
2002^	N. D. Tiwari	Indian National Congress
2007	Diwan Singh Bisht	Bharatiya Janata Party
2012	Amrita Rawat	Indian National Congress
2017	Diwan Singh Bisht	Bharatiya Janata Party
2022	Diwan Singh Bisht	Bharatiya Janata Party

^ Denotes By-poll

== Election results ==
=== 2027 Assembly election ===
2027 Uttarakhand Legislative Assembly election: Ramnagar
Party	Candidate	Votes	%	±%
INC				
BJP				
NOTA	None of the above			
Majority				
Turnout				
gain from		Swing		

=== Assembly Election 2022 ===
2022 Uttarakhand Legislative Assembly election: Ramnagar
Party	Candidate	Votes	%	±%
BJP	Diwan Singh Bisht	31,094	37.44%	▼8.77
INC	Mahendra Singh Pal	26,349	31.72%	▼3.38
Independent	Sanjay Negi	16,843	20.28%	New
Independent	Shweta Mashiwal	2,576	3.10%	New
AAP	Shishupal Singh Rawat	2,375	2.86%	New
BSP	Hem Chandra Bhatt	1,405	1.69%	▼12.19
NOTA	None of the above	915	1.10%	▼0.04
Margin of victory		4,745	5.71%	▼5.39
Turnout		83,057	67.80%	▼3.42
Registered electors		1,22,510		▲12.49
BJP hold		Swing	▼8.77	

=== Assembly Election 2017 ===
2017 Uttarakhand Legislative Assembly election: Ramnagar
Party	Candidate	Votes	%	±%
BJP	Diwan Singh Bisht	35,839	46.21%	▲15.00
INC	Ranjeet Rawat	27,228	35.10%	▼1.89
BSP	Rajeev Agarwal	10,766	13.88%	▼3.81
UKPP	Prabhat Dhyani	1,229	1.58%	▲0.67
NOTA	None of the above	887	1.14%	New
Independent	Dhaneshwari Ghildiyal	397	0.51%	New
Margin of victory		8,611	11.10%	▲5.32
Turnout		77,563	71.22%	▲0.11
Registered electors		1,08,910		▲20.12
BJP gain from INC		Swing	▲9.21	

=== Assembly Election 2012 ===
2012 Uttarakhand Legislative Assembly election: Ramnagar
Party	Candidate	Votes	%	±%
INC	Amrita Rawat	23,851	36.99%	▲15.12
BJP	Diwan Singh Bisht	20,122	31.21%	▼6.96
BSP	Kishori Lal	11,406	17.69%	▼1.86
Independent	Hem Chandra Bhatt	4,438	6.88%	New
SP	Abdul Gaffar	1,493	2.32%	▼10.68
UKPP	Prabhat Dhyani	592	0.92%	New
Independent	Mohammed Sami	555	0.86%	New
UKD	Prem Chandra Joshi	484	0.75%	▼2.39
Independent	Havivurahaman	462	0.72%	New
Independent	Kamlesh	359	0.56%	New
Margin of victory		3,729	5.78%	▼10.51
Turnout		64,472	71.11%	▲5.73
Registered electors		90,668		
INC gain from BJP		Swing	▼1.17	

=== Assembly Election 2007 ===
2007 Uttarakhand Legislative Assembly election: Ramnagar
Party	Candidate	Votes	%	±%
BJP	Diwan Singh Bisht	25,949	38.17%	▲15.09
INC	Yogambar Singh Rawat	14,873	21.88%	▼11.19
BSP	Kishori Lal	13,296	19.56%	▲10.07
SP	A. Gaffar	8,838	13.00%	▲11.30
UKD	Prabhat Dhyani	2,136	3.14%	▲0.94
Independent	Sohan Singh	913	1.34%	New
Independent	Devi Dayal	644	0.95%	New
Independent	Bhuwan Chandra	370	0.54%	New
Margin of victory		11,076	16.29%	▲6.30
Turnout		67,989	65.48%	▲6.32
Registered electors		1,03,996		
BJP gain from INC		Swing	▲5.10	

=== Assembly Election 2002 ===
2002 Uttaranchal Legislative Assembly election: Ramnagar
Party	Candidate	Votes	%	±%
INC	Yogambar Singh Rawat	16,271	33.06%	New
BJP	Diwan Singh Bisht	11,356	23.08%	New
Independent	Bhagirath Lal	7,812	15.87%	New
BSP	Parvez	4,666	9.48%	New
Independent	Hem Chandra Bhatt	3,126	6.35%	New
UKD	Narendra Kumar Pathak	1,083	2.20%	New
SP	Abrar Hussain	838	1.70%	New
Independent	Bhupal Singh	815	1.66%	New
LJP	Anurag	746	1.52%	New
RLD	Chandra Shekhar	669	1.36%	New
NCP	Saraswati	609	1.24%	New
Margin of victory		4,915	9.99%	
Turnout		49,210	59.12%	
Registered electors		83,325		
INC win (new seat)				

== See also ==
- List of constituencies of the Uttarakhand Legislative Assembly
- Nainital district
