= Tejpal Singh Rawat =

Indian politician

Lieutenant General Tejpal Singh Rawat PVSM VSM

Member of Parliament, Lok Sabha
- In office 2008–2009
- Preceded by: B. C. Khanduri
- Succeeded by: Satpal Maharaj
- Constituency: Garhwal Lok Sabha constituency

Minister of Tourism, Uttarakhand
- In office 2002–2007
- Preceded by: State created
- Succeeded by: Prakash Pant

Minister of Exercise, Uttarakhand
- In office 2002–2007
- Preceded by: State created
- Succeeded by: Madan Kaushik

Minister of Soldier Welfare, Uttarakhand
- In office 2002–2007
- Preceded by: State created
- Succeeded by: B. C. Khanduri

Member of the Uttarakhand Legislative Assembly
- In office 2002–2007
- Preceded by: State created
- Succeeded by: B. C. Khanduri
- Constituency: Dhumakot

Personal details
- Party: Bharatiya Janata Party (from 2008)
- Other political affiliations: Indian National Congress (2002-2007)

Lt. Gen. (Retd.) Tejpal Singh Rawat is an Indian politician belonging to the Bharatiya Janata Party in the state of Uttarakhand. He was a member of 14th Lok Sabha. He was elected from Garhwal Parliamentary constituency of Uttarakhand in 2008 by-poll election. He is a retired Lt. Gen. from the Indian Army. He was decorated with PVSM and VSM. After his retirement in 2000, he joined politics and was elected to Uttarakhand Legislative Assembly in 2002 from Dhumakot Assembly constituency from Indian National Congress.

== Positions held ==
Year	Description
2002 - 2007	Elected to 1st Uttarakhand Assembly: Cabinet Minister - Tourism, Excise, Soldier Welfare
2007 - 2007	Elected to 2nd Uttarakhand Assembly
2008 - 2009	Elected to 14th Lok Sabha
