= Mala Rajya Laxmi Shah =

Indian Politician

Member of Parliament, Lok Sabha
- Incumbent
- Assumed office 13 October 2012
- Preceded by: Vijay Bahuguna
- Constituency: Tehri Garhwal

Personal details
- Born: 23 August 1950 (age 75) Kathmandu, Nepal
- Party: Bharatiya Janta Party
- Spouse: Manujendra Shah Sahib Bahadur
- Children: 1
- Profession: Politician, Social Worker

Mala Rajya Laxmi Shah (born 23 August 1950) is a political and social worker, Member of Parliament elected from the Tehri Garhwal constituency in the Indian state of Uttarakhand being a Bhartiya Janata Party Leader and titular queen of erstwhile Tehri Garhwal kingdom which merged to India.

== Early life and education ==
Mala Rajya Lakshmi Devi Sahiba was born on 23 August 1950 at the Thapathali Durbar, Kathmandu, Nepal. She married Manujendra Shah Sahib Bahadur, Maharaja of Tehri Garhwal, on 7 February 1975 and has a daughter, Kshirja Kumari Devi Sahiba (b. 16 January 1976 in New Delhi).

Mala is an Intermediate and studied at Convent of Jesus and Mary, Pune and Ratna Rajya Laxmi College, Kathmandu.

== Career ==
She was elected to the 15th Lok Sabha in a by-election and is a Member, BJP State Parliamentary Board in Uttarakhand. She defeated Saket Bahuguna son of Vijay Bahuguna, then chief minister of Uttarakhand and a candidate of Indian National Congress by a margin of over 22,000.

Mala Rajya Laxmi Shah is the daughter-in-law of erstwhile Tehri royal family scion Manabendra Shah, who represented the seat in Lok Sabha a record eight times. She is the first woman elected to Lok Sabha from the state since its creation as a separate state on 9 November 2000.
