= Garhwal Lok Sabha constituency =

Lok Sabha constituency in Uttarakhand

Coordinates: 29.9°N 78.8°E

Garhwal UK-2
- Lok Sabha constituency
- Interactive Map Outlining Garhwal Lok Sabha constituency

Constituency details
- Country: India
- Region: North India
- State: Uttarakhand
- Assembly constituencies: 14: Badrinath, Tharali, Karnaprayag, Kedarnath, Rudraprayag, Devprayag, Narendranagar, Yamkeshwar, Pauri, Srinagar, Chaubattakhal, Lansdowne, Kotdwar and Ramnagar
- Established: 1952
- Total electors: 13,69,388
- Reservation: None

Member of Parliament
- 18th Lok Sabha
- Incumbent Anil Baluni
- Party: BJP
- Alliance: NDA
- Elected year: 2024

Garhwal Lok Sabha constituency is one of the five Lok Sabha (parliamentary) constituencies in Uttarakhand. This constituency came into existence in 1957, following the delimitation of Lok Sabha constituencies. It comprises five districts namely Chamoli, Nainital (part), Pauri Garhwal, Rudraprayag and Tehri Garhwal (part).

== Assembly segments ==
After the formation of Uttarakhand

At present, Garhwal Lok Sabha constituency comprises the following fourteen Vidhan Sabha (legislative assembly) segments:

#	Name	District	Member	Party	Leading (in 2024)
4	Badrinath	Chamoli	Lakhpat Singh Butola	INC	BJP
5	Tharali (SC)	Chamoli	Bhupal Ram Tamta	BJP	BJP
6	Karnaprayag	Chamoli	Anil Nautiyal	BJP	BJP
7	Kedarnath	Rudraprayag	Asha Nautiyal	BJP	BJP
8	Rudraprayag	Rudraprayag	Bharat Singh Chaudhary	BJP	BJP
10	Devprayag	Tehri Garhwal	Vinod Kandari	BJP	BJP
11	Narendranagar	Tehri Garhwal	Subodh Uniyal	BJP	BJP
36	Yamkeshwar	Pauri Garhwal	Renu Bisht	BJP	BJP
37	Pauri (SC)	Pauri Garhwal	Rajkumar Pori	BJP	BJP
38	Srinagar	Pauri Garhwal	Dhan Singh Rawat	BJP	BJP
39	Chaubattakhal	Pauri Garhwal	Satpal Maharaj	BJP	BJP
40	Lansdowne	Pauri Garhwal	Dilip Singh Rawat	BJP	BJP
41	Kotdwar	Pauri Garhwal	Ritu Khanduri Bhushan	BJP	BJP
61	Ramnagar	Nainital	Diwan Singh Bisht	BJP	BJP

Before the formation of Uttarakhand

Garhwal Lok Sabha constituency comprised the following five Vidhan Sabha (legislative assembly) constituency segments of Uttar Pradesh:

District	Assembly constituency segments	
District	Name	SC/ST
Bijnor	Najibabad	
Chamoli
Chamoli	Badri–Kedar	
Chamoli	Karnaprayag	
Pauri Garhwal
Pauri Garhwal	Lansdowne	
Pauri Garhwal	Pauri	

== Members of Parliament ==
Year	Member	Party
1952	Bhakt Darshan	Indian National Congress
1957	Bhakt Darshan	Indian National Congress
1962	Bhakt Darshan	Indian National Congress
1967	Bhakt Darshan	Indian National Congress
1971	Pratap Singh Negi	Indian National Congress
1977	Pandit. Jagannath Sharma	Janata Party
1980	Hemwati Nandan Bahuguna	Indian National Congress
1982^	Hemwati Nandan Bahuguna	Independent
1984	Chandra Mohan Singh Negi	Indian National Congress
1989	Chandra Mohan Singh Negi	Janata Dal
1991	B. C. Khanduri	Bharatiya Janata Party
1996	Satpal Maharaj	All India Indira Congress (T)
1998	B. C. Khanduri	Bharatiya Janata Party
1999	B. C. Khanduri	Bharatiya Janata Party
2004	B. C. Khanduri	Bharatiya Janata Party
2008^	Tejpal Singh Rawat	Bharatiya Janata Party
2009	Satpal Maharaj	Indian National Congress
2014	B. C. Khanduri	Bharatiya Janata Party
2019	Tirath Singh Rawat	Bharatiya Janata Party
2024	Anil Baluni	Bharatiya Janata Party

^By election

== Election results ==
=== 2024 ===
2024 Indian general elections: Garhwal
Party	Candidate	Votes	%	±%
BJP	Anil Baluni	432,159	58.60	▼9.65
INC	Ganesh Godiyal	2,68,656	36.43	▲8.92
NOTA	None of the Above	11,375	1.54	▼0.11
Margin of victory		1,36,503	22.17	▼18.58
Turnout		7,46,210	53.14	▼1.98
BJP hold		Swing		

=== 2019 ===
2019 Indian general elections: Garhwal
Party	Candidate	Votes	%	±%
BJP	Tirath Singh Rawat	506,980	68.25	▲8.77
INC	Manish Khanduri	2,04,311	27.51	▼4.92
NOTA	None of the Above	12,276	1.65	▲0.38
Margin of victory		3,02,669	40.75	▲13.69
Turnout		7,48,022	55.17	▲1.19
BJP hold		Swing		

=== 2014 ===
2014 Indian general elections: Garhwal
Party	Candidate	Votes	%	±%
BJP	Bhuwan Chandra Khanduri	405,690	59.48	▲15.07
INC	Harak Singh Rawat	2,21,164	32.43	▼8.72
BSP	Dheer Singh Bisht	9,250	1.36	
NOTA	None of the Above	8,659	1.27	N/A
Margin of victory		1,84,526	27.06	▲23.80
Turnout		6,84,014	53.98	
BJP gain from INC		Swing	▲10.71	

=== 2009 ===
2009 Indian general elections: Garhwal
Party	Candidate	Votes	%	±%
INC	Satpal Maharaj	236,949	44.12	
BJP	Lt. Gen. (Retd.) Tejpal Singh Rawat	2,19,552	40.88	
BSP	Rajeev Agarwal	34,622	6.45	
CPI	Lalita Prasad Bhatt	7,330	1.36	
Margin of victory		17,397	3.26	
Turnout		5,33,843	48.87	
INC gain from BJP		Swing		

== See also ==
- List of constituencies of the Lok Sabha
- List of parliamentary constituencies in Uttarakhand
