= Tehri Garhwal Lok Sabha constituency =

Lok Sabha constituency in Uttarakhand

Coordinates: 30.4°N 78.5°E

Tehri Garhwal UK-1
- Lok Sabha constituency
- Interactive Map Outlining Tehri Garhwal Lok Sabha constituency

Constituency details
- Country: India
- Region: North India
- State: Uttarakhand
- Assembly constituencies: 14: Purola, Gangotri, Yamunotri, Ghansali, Pratapnagar, Tehri, Dhanaulti, Chakrata, Vikasnagar, Sahaspur, Raipur, Rajpur Road, Dehradun Cantonment and Mussoorie
- Established: 1957
- Total electors: 15,77,664
- Reservation: None

Member of Parliament
- 18th Lok Sabha
- Incumbent Mala Rajya Laxmi Shah
- Party: BJP
- Alliance: NDA
- Elected year: 2024

Tehri Garhwal Lok Sabha constituency is one of the five Lok Sabha (parliamentary) constituencies in Uttarakhand. This constituency came into existence in 1957, following the delimitation of Lok Sabha constituencies. It comprises the districts of Dehradun (part), Tehri Garhwal (part) and Uttarakashi.

== Assembly segments ==
After the formation of Uttarakhand

At present, Tehri Garhwal Lok Sabha constituency comprises the following fourteen Vidhan Sabha (legislative assembly) segments:

#	Name	District	Member	Party	Leading (in 2024)
1	Purola (SC)	Uttarkashi	Durgeshwar Lal	BJP	IND
2	Yamunotri	Uttarkashi	Sanjay Dobhal	IND	IND
3	Gangotri	Uttarkashi	Suresh Singh Chauhan	BJP	BJP
9	Ghansali (SC)	Tehri Garhwal	Shakti Lal Shah	BJP	BJP
12	Pratapnagar	Tehri Garhwal	Vikram Singh Negi	INC	BJP
13	Tehri	Tehri Garhwal	Kishore Upadhyaya	BJP	BJP
14	Dhanaulti	Tehri Garhwal	Pritam Singh Panwar	BJP	BJP
15	Chakrata (ST)	Dehradun	Pritam Singh	INC	IND
16	Vikasnagar	Dehradun	Munna Singh Chauhan	BJP	BJP
17	Sahaspur	Dehradun	Sahdev Singh Pundir	BJP	BJP
19	Raipur	Dehradun	Umesh Sharma 'Kau'	BJP	BJP
20	Rajpur Road (SC)	Dehradun	Khajan Dass	BJP	BJP
21	Dehradun Cantt	Dehradun	Savita Kapoor	BJP	BJP
22	Mussoorie	Dehradun	Ganesh Joshi	BJP	BJP

Before the formation of Uttarakhand

Tehri Garhwal Lok Sabha constituency comprised the following five Vidhan Sabha (legislative assembly) constituency segments of Uttar Pradesh:

District	Assembly constituency segments	
District	Name	SC/ST
Dehradun
Dehradun	Chakrata	ST
Dehradun	Mussoorie	
Tehri Garhwal
Tehri Garhwal	Devprayag	
Tehri Garhwal	Tehri	
Uttarkashi	Uttarkashi	SC

== Members of Parliament ==
Year	Member	Party
1952	Kamalendumati Shah	Independent politician
1957	Manabendra Shah	Indian National Congress
1962	Manabendra Shah	Indian National Congress
1967	Manabendra Shah	Indian National Congress
1971	Paripoornanand Painuli	Indian National Congress
1977	Trepan Singh Negi	Janata Party
1980	Trepan Singh Negi	Indian National Congress
1984	Brahm Dutt	Indian National Congress
1989	Brahm Dutt	Indian National Congress
1991	Manabendra Shah	Bharatiya Janata Party
1996	Manabendra Shah	Bharatiya Janata Party
1998	Manabendra Shah	Bharatiya Janata Party
1999	Manabendra Shah	Bharatiya Janata Party
2004	Manabendra Shah	Bharatiya Janata Party
2007^	Vijay Bahuguna	Indian National Congress
2009	Vijay Bahuguna	Indian National Congress
2012^	Mala Rajya Laxmi Shah	Bharatiya Janata Party
2014	Mala Rajya Laxmi Shah	Bharatiya Janata Party
2019	Mala Rajya Laxmi Shah	Bharatiya Janata Party
2024	Mala Rajya Laxmi Shah	Bharatiya Janata Party

^ by-poll

== Election results ==
=== 2024 ===
2024 Indian general election: Tehri Garhwal
Party	Candidate	Votes	%	±%
BJP	Mala Rajya Laxmi Shah	462,603	53.66	▼10.87
INC	Jot Singh Gunsola	1,90,110	22.05	▼8.17
IND	Bobby Panwar	1,68,081	19.5	New
BSP	Nemchand	6,908	0.8	▲0.15
NOTA	None of the Above	7,458	0.87	
Majority		2,72,493	31.61	▼2.7
Turnout		8,66,774	54.50	▼4.37
BJP hold		Swing	▼2.7	

=== 2019 ===
2019 Indian general elections: Tehri Garhwal
Party	Candidate	Votes	%	±%
BJP	Mala Rajya Laxmi Shah	565,333	64.53	▲7.03
INC	Pritam Singh	2,64,747	30.22	▼2.5
Independent	Gopal Mani	10,686	1.22	New
CPI(M)	Rajendra Purohit	6,626	0.76	New
Independent	Sardar Khan	5,457	0.62	New
NOTA	None of the Above	6,276	0.72	▼0.67
Margin of victory		3,00,586	34.31	▲9.63
Turnout		8,79,183	58.87	▲1.47
BJP hold		Swing		

=== 2014 ===
2014 Indian general elections: Tehri Garhwal
Party	Candidate	Votes	%	±%
BJP	Mala Rajya Laxmi Shah	446,733	57.50	▲9.39
INC	Saket Bahuguna	2,54,230	32.72	▼10.95
NOTA	None of the Above	10,762	1.39	N/A
Margin of victory		1,92,503	24.68	▲20.24
Turnout		7,76,214	57.39	▲14.73
BJP hold		Swing	▲9.39	

=== 2012 by-election ===
Bye-election, 2012: Tehri Garhwal
Party	Candidate	Votes	%	±%
BJP	Mala Rajya Laxmi Shah	245,835	48.11	▲12.19
INC	Saket Bahuguna	2,23,141	43.67	▼1.3
URM	Japinder Singh Uttarakhandi	7,466	1.46	New
UKD (P)	Trivendra Singh Panwar	6,939	1.36	New
UKD (D)	Yogi Rakesh Nath	4,100	0.80	New
Majority		22,694	4.44	▼4.62
Turnout		5,11,499	42.70	▼7.68
BJP gain from INC		Swing		

=== 2009 ===
2009 Indian general elections: Tehri Garhwal
Party	Candidate	Votes	%	±%
INC	Vijay Bahuguna	263,083	44.97	
BJP	Jaspal Rana	2,10,144	35.92	
Majority		52,939	9.06	
Turnout		5,84,296	50.38	
INC hold		Swing		

== See also ==
- List of constituencies of the Lok Sabha
- List of parliamentary constituencies in Uttarakhand
