= B. C. Khanduri =

4th Chief Minister of Uttarakhand (1934-2026)

Major General Bhuwan Chandra Khanduri AVSM
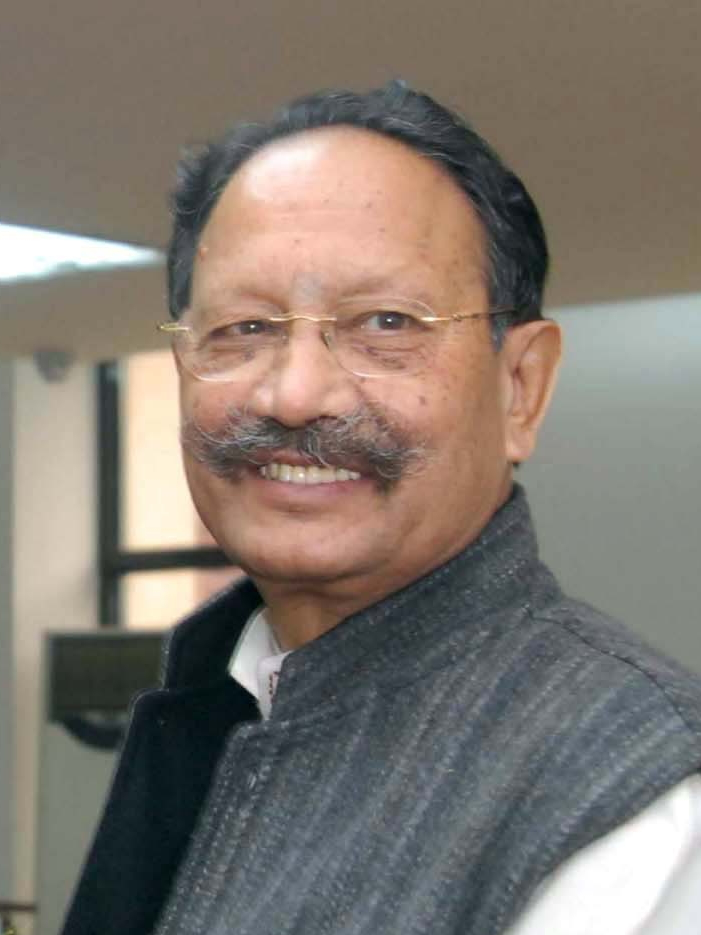
- Khanduri in 2007

4th Chief Minister of Uttarakhand
- In office 11 September 2011 – 13 March 2012
- Preceded by: Ramesh Pokhriyal
- Succeeded by: Vijay Bahuguna
- In office 8 March 2007 – 23 June 2009
- Preceded by: N. D. Tiwari
- Succeeded by: Ramesh Pokhriyal

Union Minister for Road Transport and Highways
- In office 7 November 2000 – 22 May 2004
- Prime Minister: Atal Bihari Vajpayee
- Preceded by: Atal Bihari Vajpayee
- Succeeded by: T. R. Baalu

Member of Parliament, Lok Sabha
- In office 16 May 2014 – 23 May 2019
- Preceded by: Satpal Maharaj
- Succeeded by: Tirath Singh Rawat
- Constituency: Garhwal
- In office 3 March 1998 – 8 March 2007
- Preceded by: Satpal Maharaj
- Succeeded by: Tejpal Singh Rawat
- Constituency: Garhwal
- In office 22 June 1991 – 12 May 1996
- Preceded by: Chandra Mohan Singh Negi
- Succeeded by: Satpal Maharaj
- Constituency: Garhwal

Personal details
- Born: 1 October 1934 Dehradun, United Provinces of Agra and Oudh, British India (now in Uttarakhand, India)
- Died: 19 May 2026 (aged 91) Dehradun, Uttarakhand, India
- Citizenship: India
- Party: Bharatiya Janata Party
- Spouse: Aruna Khanduri
- Children: 2, including Ritu
- Education: B.Sc.; B.E. (Civil); M.I.E. (India); PG Diploma in Management, Administrative Behavior and Leadership Course; Long Defence Management Course
- Alma mater: Defence Services Staff College, Wellington, Tamil Nadu; Defence Services Staff College, Camberley, England; Allahabad University 1951–53; College of Military Engineering, Pune 1957–59; Institute of Engineers, New Delhi; Institute of Defence Management, Secunderabad 1973–74; Institute of Public Administration, New Delhi 1976
- Awards: Ati Vishisht Seva Medal (1982); Mother Teresa International Award (2013)

Military service
- Allegiance: India
- Branch: Indian Army
- Service years: 1954–1991
- Rank: Major General
- As of 16 September, 2006

Major General Bhuwan Chandra Khanduri (Retd.), AVSM (1 October 1934 – 19 May 2026) was an Indian politician who served as the Chief Minister of Uttarakhand from 2007 to 2009 and 2011 to 2012. Between 2000 and 2004, he served in Prime Minister Atal Bihari Vajpayee's cabinet, as Minister of Transport and Highways. He was a Member of Parliament in the 10th, 12th, 13th, 14th and 16th Lok Sabha representing the Garhwal parliamentary constituency of Uttarakhand and was a senior member of the Bharatiya Janta Party.

== Background ==
Khanduri was born at Dehradun on 1 October 1934. His parents were Jai Ballabh Khanduri (father), a journalist, and Durga Devi Khanduri (mother), a social activist. Khanduri was married to Aruna Khanduri (née Nailwal). He had a son Manish Khanduri and daughter Ritu Khanduri Bhushan.

== Educational profile ==
Khanduri was B.Sc., B.E. and M.I.E. (India). He was also a post-graduate in defence management. He studied at College of Military Engineering, Pune, Allahabad University, Institute of Engineers, New Delhi, and Institute of Defence Management, Secunderabad.

== Army career ==
Khanduri served in Corps of Engineers, Indian Army, from 1954 to 1991. Positions held in the army include:

- Commander of Regiment (during the Indo-Pakistan War in 1971)
- Chief Engineer in the Army
- Commander of an Engineering Brigade
- Additional Military Secretary at Army Headquarters
- Additional Director General in the Engineer-in-Chief's division at the Army Headquarters

In 1983, he received the Ati Vishisht Seva Medal from the President of India for distinguished service of an exceptional order. He retired as a Major General.

== Political career ==
Khanduri was first elected to Lok Sabha from Garhwal in Uttarakhand in 1991 and in subsequent elections. He was the Minister of State (with independent charge) of the Ministry of Road Transport and Highways from 2000 to 2003 in the Union government headed by Atal Bihari Vajpayee. He was elevated to cabinet rank in 2003, and held the post until the end of the tenure of the NDA government in May 2004. He was a senior leader of Bhartiya Janata Party, having served on various parliamentary committees. As a minister, he implemented BJP's National Highways Development project. At the Ministry of Road Transport and Highways, he executed the National Highways Development Plan of the NDA and gave shape to the Golden Quadrilateral Project connecting the major Indian cities and the North–South and East–West Corridor Project.

In February 2007, he led the BJP to victory in the assembly elections in Uttarakhand and was subsequently chosen to be the new Chief Minister of the state. Among Khanduri's first accomplishments as Chief Minister was to cut expenses by reducing his own security and that of politicians and administrative officials, cutting back on their allowance for foreign trips and restricting the use of the Chief Minister's discretionary fund to the projects approved by the district magistrates. Following his election, he toured the entire state to gain first hand information about the conditions of the people. On 11 September 2011, Khanduri announced the setting up of a stronger Lokayukta to check rampant corruption. The Uttarakhand Government approved the draft of the Lokayukta Bill, bringing within its ambit all the ministers, including the Chief Minister, the MLAs and the government servants including IAS and IPS officers, with a provision of life imprisonment or more severe punishment. The eco-friendly and sustainable industrial development of the state was, inter-alia, among the top priorities of Khanduri.

In 2012, under his leadership the BJP fought the state legislative assembly elections with the slogan 'Khanduri Hai Zaroori'(meaning- Khanduri is necessary). In a closely fought election the BJP fell 1 seat behind Congress and ultimately lost the election after Congress stiched together a coailation with smaller parties. He lost from his own seat of Kotdwar. However, in 2014 general election, he made a comeback after he won from Garhwal Lok Sabha constituency by a massive margin. After 2019, he distanced himself from active politics.

== Political positions held ==
- Member of Parliament from the Garhwal Lok Sabha Constituency in 10th, 12th, 13th, 14th and 16th Lok Sabha
- 1992–97: Member of the National Executive, Bhartiya Janata Party
- 1992–97: Vice President of the BJP State Unit of Uttar Pradesh
- During 12th and 13th Lok Sabha: Chief whip of Bhartiya Janata Party in the Parliament
- 1998–99: Member of various parliamentary committees (Committee on Public Accounts, Rules Committee, Business Advisory Committee, and Committee on Home Affairs)
- 1999: Member of the Consultative Committee, Ministry of Defence, Member of the Committee on Public Undertakings
- 2000–01: Member of the Committee on Ethics; Consultative Committee, Ministry of Petroleum and Natural Gas
- 7 November 2000: Union Minister of State (Independent Charge), Ministry of Road Transport and Highways
- 2000–03: Member of National Executive, Bhartiya Janata Party
- 2007-09: He served as the 4th Chief Minister of Uttarakhand
- 2011–12: Chief Minister of Uttarakhand
- 6 March 2012 B C Khanduri lost the election from constituency Kotdwar, Uttrakhand
- 16 May 2014: Won the Garhwal constituency by a margin of 1,84,526 votes

He also represented Departments of Personnel, Public Grievances and Pensions, and Law and Company Affairs, and was a convener of the Subcommittee on Personnel Policy of Central Paramilitary Forces (CPMFs) under different capacities.

== Public image ==
While he presided over the state government of Uttarakhand he pushed for the implementation of a strong Lokayukta bill (public ombudsman), citizen charter and a transparent transfer policy for state employers. The passage of the Lokayukta earned Khanduri praise from Anna Hazare, who urged the Union government and other state governments to follow suit. The bill, however, has not been accepted by the Union of India. Presidential approval was given on 17 October 2013.

== Social activities ==
Khanduri had overseen the activities of the Chandra Ballabh Trust, an educational trust in Garhwal initiated by his grandfather in 1917. He was also associated with other organisations in various capacities including Purva Sainik Seva Parishad (Uttar Pradesh), Parvatiya Sanskriti Parishad in Dehradun, Govind Ballabh Pant Himalaya Environment and Development Committee and the Wild Life Society of India.

He was also the chairperson of the Uttaranchal Pradesh Sangarsh Samiti.

== Death ==
Khanduri died in Dehradun on 19 May 2026, at the age of 91. He had been unwell for a considerable time and had undergone frequent hospitalisations at the time of his death.

== See also ==
- B. C. Khanduri ministry (2007–09)
- B. C. Khanduri ministry (2011–12)

== Sources ==
- http://cm.uk.gov.in/
- http://uk.gov.in/

Lok Sabha
Preceded by Chandra Mohan Singh Negi	Member of Parliament for Garhwal; 1991–1996	Succeeded by Satpal Maharaj
Preceded by Satpal Maharaj	Member of Parliament for Garhwal; 1998–2007	Succeeded by Tejpal Singh Rawat
Preceded by Satpal Maharaj	Member of Parliament for Garhwal; 2014–2019	Succeeded by Tirath Singh Rawat
Political offices
Preceded by N. D. Tiwari	Chief Minister of Uttarakhand; 8 March 2007 – 23 June 2009	Succeeded by Ramesh Pokhriyal
Preceded by Ramesh Pokhriyal	Chief Minister of Uttarakhand; 11 September 2011 – 13 March 2012	Succeeded by Vijay Bahuguna
