= Haridwar Lok Sabha constituency =

Lok Sabha constituency in Uttarakhand

Coordinates: 29.9°N 78.1°E

Haridwar UK-5
- Lok Sabha constituency
- Interactive Map Outlining Haridwar Lok Sabha constituency

Constituency details
- Country: India
- Region: North India
- State: Uttarakhand
- Assembly constituencies: 14: Dharampur, Doiwala, Rishikesh, Haridwar, BHEL Ranipur, Jwalapur, Bhagwanpur, Jhabrera, Piran Kaliyar, Roorkee, Khanpur, Manglaur, Laksar and Haridwar Rural
- Established: 1977
- Total electors: 20,35,726
- Reservation: None

Member of Parliament
- 18th Lok Sabha
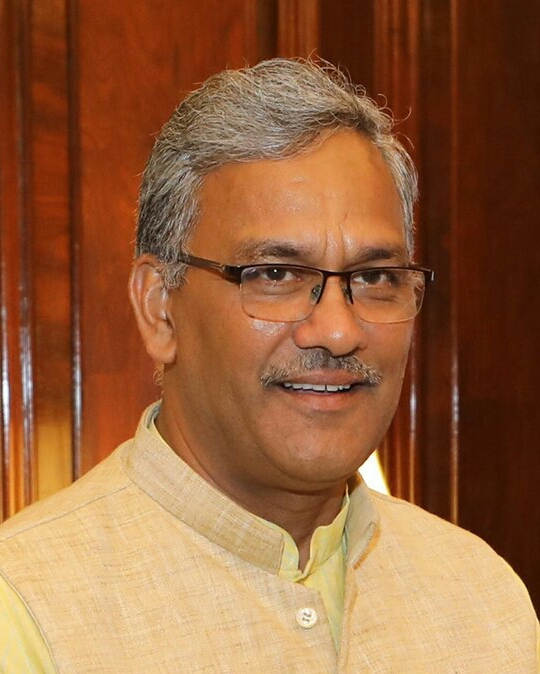
- Incumbent Trivendra Singh Rawat
- Party: BJP
- Alliance: NDA
- Elected year: 2024

Haridwar Lok Sabha constituency is one of the five Lok Sabha (parliamentary) constituencies in Uttarakhand. It comprises two districts namely Dehradun (part) and Haridwar. This constituency came into existence in 1977, following the delimitation of Lok Sabha constituencies. Between the period of 1977 and 2009, this constituency was reserved for the Scheduled Caste candidates.

== Assembly segments ==
After the formation of Uttarakhand

At present, Haridwar Lok Sabha constituency comprises the following fourteen Vidhan Sabha (legislative assembly) segments:

#	Name	District	Member	Party	Leading (in 2024)
18	Dharampur	Dehradun	Vinod Chamoli	BJP	BJP
23	Doiwala	Dehradun	Brij Bhushan Gairola	BJP	BJP
24	Rishikesh	Dehradun	Premchand Aggarwal	BJP	BJP
25	Haridwar	Haridwar	Madan Kaushik	BJP	BJP
26	BHEL Ranipur	Haridwar	Adesh Chauhan	BJP	BJP
27	Jwalapur (SC)	Haridwar	Ravi Bahadur	INC	INC
28	Bhagwanpur (SC)	Haridwar	Mamta Rakesh	INC	INC
29	Jhabrera (SC)	Haridwar	Virendra Kumar	INC	INC
30	Piran Kaliyar	Haridwar	Furqan Ahmad	INC	INC
31	Roorkee	Haridwar	Pradip Batra	BJP	BJP
32	Khanpur	Haridwar	Umesh Kumar	IND	BJP
33	Manglaur	Haridwar	Qazi Muhammad Nizamuddin	INC	INC
34	Laksar	Haridwar	Muhammad Shahzad	BSP	INC
35	Haridwar Rural	Haridwar	Anupama Rawat	INC	BJP

Before the formation of Uttarakhand

Haridwar Lok Sabha constituency comprised the following five Vidhan Sabha (legislative assembly) constituency segments of Uttar Pradesh:

District	Assembly constituency segments	
District	Name	SC/ST
Dehradun	Dehradun	
Haridwar
Haridwar	Haridwar	
Haridwar	Laksar	
Haridwar	Roorkee	
Muzaffarnagar	Purqazi	SC

== Members of Parliament ==
Year	Member	Party
1977	Bhagwan Das Rathod	Janata Party
1980	Jag Pal Singh	Janata Party (Secular)
1984	Sunder Lal	Indian National Congress
1987^	Ram Singh Mandebas	Indian National Congress
1989	Jag Pal Singh	Indian National Congress
1991	Ram Singh Mandebas	Bharatiya Janata Party
1996	Harpal Singh Sathi	Bharatiya Janata Party
1998	Harpal Singh Sathi	Bharatiya Janata Party
1999	Harpal Singh Sathi	Bharatiya Janata Party
2004	Rajendra Kumar Badi	Samajwadi Party
2009	Harish Rawat	Indian National Congress
2014	Ramesh Pokhriyal	Bharatiya Janata Party
2019	Ramesh Pokhriyal	Bharatiya Janata Party
2024	Trivendra Singh Rawat	Bharatiya Janata Party

== Election results ==
=== 2024 ===
2024 Indian general elections: Haridwar
Party	Candidate	Votes	%	±%
BJP	Trivendra Singh Rawat	653,808	50.19	▼2.18
INC	Virendra Rawat	4,89,752	37.60	▲5.58
IND	Umesh Kumar Patrakar	91,188	7.00	New entry
BSP	Jamil Ahmad	42,323	3.25	▼10.4
UKD	Mohan Singh Aswal	2,858	0.22	
NOTA	None of the Above	6,826	0.52	▲0.03
Margin of victory		1,66,056	12.59	▼7.76
Turnout		13,04,517	63.90	▼5.35
BJP hold		Swing		

=== 2019 ===
2019 Indian general elections: Haridwar
Party	Candidate	Votes	%	±%
BJP	Ramesh Pokhriyal	665,674	52.37	▲1.99
INC	Ambrish Kumar	406,945	32.02	▼3.23
BSP	Antriksh Saini	173,528	13.65	▲3.98
NOTA	None of the Above	6,281	0.49	▲0.23
Margin of victory		2,58,729	20.35	▲5.22
Turnout		12,71,030	69.25	▼2.31
BJP hold		Swing		

=== 2014 ===
2014 Indian general elections: Hardwar
Party	Candidate	Votes	%	±%
BJP	Ramesh Pokhriyal	592,320	50.38	▲24.39
INC	Renuka Rawat	4,14,498	35.25	▼6.91
BSP	Mohammad Islam	1,13,663	9.67	▼13.34
AAP	Kanchan Chaudhary Bhattacharya	18,170	1.55	N/A
SP	Anita Saini	5,765	0.49	▼4.18
NOTA	None of the Above	3,049	0.26	N/A
Margin of victory		1,77,822	15.13	▼1.04
Turnout		11,75,692	71.56	▲10.68
BJP gain from INC		Swing	▲8.22	

=== 2009 ===
2009 Indian general elections: Hardwar
Party	Candidate	Votes	%	±%
INC	Harish Rawat	332,235	42.14	
BJP	Yatindranand Giri	2,04,823	25.98	
BSP	Shahzad	1,81,296	23.00	
Margin of victory		1,27,412	16.17	
Turnout		7,88,121	60.89	
INC gain from SP		Swing		

== See also ==
- List of constituencies of the Lok Sabha
- List of parliamentary constituencies in Uttarakhand
