= Khushal Singh Adhikari =

Indian politician (born 1967)

Member of Uttarakhand Legislative Assembly
- Incumbent
- Assumed office 10 March 2022
- Preceded by: Puran Singh Phartyal
- Constituency: Lohaghat

Personal details
- Born: 1967 (age 58–59)
- Party: Indian National Congress
- Profession: Politician

Khushal Singh Adhikari (born 1967) is an Indian politician from Uttarakhand. He is an MLA from Lohaghat Assembly constituency in Champawat district. He won as an MLA in the 2022 Uttarakhand Legislative Assembly election representing the Indian National Congress.

== Early life and education ==
Adhikari is from Lohaghat, Champawat district, Uttarakhand. He is the son of Trilok Singh. He is a "A" class contractor by profession.

== Career ==
Adhikari won from Lohaghat Assembly constituency representing Indian National Congress in the 2022 Uttarakhand Legislative Assembly election. He polled 32,950 votes and defeated his nearest rival, Puran Singh Phartyal of Bharatiya Janata Party, by a margin of 6,038 votes. He had earlier lost from Lohaghat Assembly constituency in 2017 Uttarakhand Assembly election as an Indian National Congress candidate to Puran Singh Fartyal of Bharatiya Janata Party by a narrow margin of 834 votes.
