= Mahendra Singh Mahra =

Indian politician and agriculturist (born 1939)

Mahendra Singh Mehra

MP of Rajya Sabha for Uttarakhand
- In office 3 April 2012 – 2 April 2018
- Preceded by: Satyavrat Chaturvedi
- Succeeded by: Anil Baluni

Minister of agriculture and irrigation, Uttarakhand government
- In office 2002–2007
- Chief Minister: N.D. Tiwari

Member of Legislative assembly, Uttarakhand Legislative Assembly
- In office 2002–2012
- Preceded by: Constituency established
- Succeeded by: Puran Singh Fartyal
- Constituency: Lohaghat

Member of Legislative assembly
- In office 1993–1996
- Preceded by: Krishna Chandra Punetha
- Succeeded by: Krishna Chandra Punetha
- Constituency: Pithoragarh
- In office 1989–1991
- Preceded by: Kamal Kishan Pandey
- Succeeded by: Krishna Chandra Punetha
- Constituency: Pithoragarh

Personal details
- Born: 12 June 1939 (age 87) Pithoragarh, Uttarakhand
- Party: Indian National Congress
- Education: B.A. from Agra University

Mahendra Singh Mahra (born Siltham, Pithoragarh district, Uttarakhand) is an Indian politician and agriculturist who served as a Member of Parliament, Rajya Sabha from Uttarakhand (April 2012 to April 2018), served as Minister Agriculture, Agricultural Marketing & Watershed Management, Government of Uttarakhand (2002 to 2007) and served as a four time MLA representing Pithoragarh Assembly constituency in the first two terms and Lohaghat in the next two terms.

He also served as Member of the Parliamentary Standing Committee on Rural development. Presently he is a member of AIIMS, Rishikesh.

== Early life and education ==
Mahendra Singh Mahra was born on to Bishan Singh Mahra and Parvati Mahra who hailed from a Jagirdar Thakur family of a town of Pithoragarh. He finished his Primary and secondary education in a school run by the missionaries in Pithoragarh. Later, he graduated through a B.A. degree from Agra University.

His father Bishan Singh Mahra was the first chairperson of the township of Pithoragarh. His uncle Uday Singh Mahra served the people of the town by laying the founding stone of the town's only library, Nagar Palika, sports ground, etc. Following his father's and uncle's footsteps, young Mahra got into politics.

== Personal life ==
In the year 1984 Mahra married Vaijayanti who hails from the princely state of Bhavnagar. Vaijayanti's great-grandfather (paternal) was first cousin of Maharaja Krishna Kumar Singhji of Bhavnagar, Gujarat and her maternal great-grandfather was the younger brother of Maharaja Amar Singh ji, Rajadhiraj Banera, Rajasthan.

They have three children, two daughters and a son.

A football player, boxer and a heavy weight-lifter Mahra has, at various points, taken interest in increasing funding and resources dedicated to local sports with particular interest in youth sports.

== Political career ==
Mahra once said that he chose Congress because he can relate to the views of the party. He is a lifelong Congressman. In the year 1967 Mahra organized the district youth to welcome the then Prime Minister Mrs. Indira Gandhi and it was in her presence that he was sworn in as a member of Congress.

1970 - 1977 he served as a member of Nagar Palika Parishad, Pithoragarh 1974 - 1984 he became the President district youth Congress, Pithoragarh 1972 - 1988 Treasurer District Congress Committee, Pithoragarh 1980 - 1985 Member parvatiya vikas parishad Lucknow

January 1989 he became an unopposed Chairman Zila Parishad, Pithoragarh and the same year he organized a visit of Late. Prime Minister (Shri) Rajiv Gandhi and Smt. Sonia Gandhi to the district of Pithoragarh. December same year, 1989 he became an MLA for the first time. December 1989 to March 1991 MLA UP assembly November 1993 to September 1995 MLA UP Assembly 1991 to 2000 Member Pradesh Congress Committee, UP 1991 to 2007 Member All India Congress Committee, New Delhi 2000 to 2009 General Secretary Pradesh Congress Committee, Uttarakhand 2002 to 2007 Minister Agriculture, Agricultural Marketing & Watershed Management, Govt of Uttarakhand 2007 to 2012 MLA Uttarakhand Assembly 2012 to 2018 MP, Rajya Sabha.

== Electoral performance ==
=== Rajya Sabha Election 2012 ===
2012 Rajya Sabha elections : Uttarakhand
Party	Candidate	Votes	%
INC	Mahendra Singh Mahra	39	55.71
BJP	Anil Goyal	31	44.29
Majority		8	11.43
Turnout		70	100.0
INC hold			

=== Assembly Election 2012 ===
2012 Uttarakhand Legislative Assembly election: Lohaghat
Party	Candidate	Votes	%	±%
BJP	Puran Singh Phartyal	30,429	59.02%	▲26.58
INC	Mahendra Singh Mahra	18,894	36.65%	▲0.43
BSP	Govind Pandey	2,187	4.24%	▲1.65
Margin of victory		11,535	22.37%	▲18.59
Turnout		51,559	55.10%	▼1.89
Registered electors		93,567		
BJP gain from INC		Swing		

=== Assembly Election 2007 ===
2007 Uttarakhand Legislative Assembly election: Lohaghat
Party	Candidate	Votes	%	±%
INC	Mahendra Singh Mahra	15,433	36.21%	▲13.85
BJP	Krishna Chandra Punetha	13,823	32.43%	▲11.56
Independent	Lalit Mohan Pandey	4,635	10.88%	New
UKD	Prahlad Singh	3,209	7.53%	▼11.79
Independent	Kalyan Singh	1,529	3.59%	New
Independent	Sundar Singh	1,124	2.64%	New
BSP	Ambi Ram	1,103	2.59%	▼7.45
Independent	Suresh Tewari	1,052	2.47%	New
SP	Usha Devi	711	1.67%	▲0.44
Margin of victory		1,610	3.78%	▲2.29
Turnout		42,619	57.01%	▲5.15
Registered electors		74,780		
INC hold		Swing	▲13.85	

=== Assembly Election 2002 ===
2002 Uttaranchal Legislative Assembly election: Lohaghat
Party	Candidate	Votes	%	±%
INC	Mahendra Singh Mahra	7,648	22.36%	New
BJP	Krishna Chandra Punetha	7,138	20.87%	New
UKD	Navin Murari	6,609	19.32%	New
BSP	Puran Singh Phartyal	3,432	10.03%	New
Independent	Kailash Chandra Gahtori	2,767	8.09%	New
Independent	Hukam Singh Kunwar	1,839	5.38%	New
Independent	Har Govind Singh Bohra	1,614	4.72%	New
Independent	Abha Singh	844	2.47%	New
Independent	Lalit Lal Verma	807	2.36%	New
SP	Vipin Punetha	421	1.23%	New
Independent	Bhagwan Singh Mahra	401	1.17%	New
Independent	Lalit Prasad Pandey	345	1.01%	New
Independent	Ghyansham	339	0.99%	New
Margin of victory		510	1.49%	
Turnout		34,204	51.84%	
Registered electors		65,980		
INC win (new seat)				

=== Assembly Election 1996 ===
1996 Uttar Pradesh Legislative Assembly election: Pithoragarh
Party	Candidate	Votes	%	±%
BJP	Krishna Chandra Punetha	37,221	41.30%	▲1.09
INC	Mahendra Singh Mahra	26,276	29.20%	▼18.40
AIIC(T)	Laxman Singh	13,998	15.50%	New
UKD	Chandra Shekhar Kapri	9,280	10.30%	▲6.31
Margin of victory		10,945	12.10%	▲4.71
Turnout		91,772	45.10%	▲3.88
Registered electors		2,03,454		▲13.99
BJP gain from INC		Swing	▲9.75	

=== Assembly Election 1993 ===
1993 Uttar Pradesh Legislative Assembly election: Pithoragarh
Party	Candidate	Votes	%	±%
INC	Mahendra Singh Mahra	35,025	47.60%	▲9.09
BJP	Krishna Chandra Punetha	29,584	40.21%	▼5.68
UKD	Chandra Shekhar Kapri	2,933	3.99%	▼4.25
SP	Hira Singh Bora	2,454	3.33%	New
Independent	Harish Singh	527	0.72%	New
Doordarshi Party	Dev Shankar	524	0.71%	▼0.30
Independent	Hari Ram	462	0.63%	New
Independent	Hem Chandra Pande	411	0.56%	New
Independent	Amba Datt	385	0.52%	New
Majority		5,441	7.39%	▲0.01
Turnout		73,584	41.22%	▼1.99
Registered electors		1,78,491		▲5.94
INC gain from BJP		Swing	▲9.09	

=== Assembly Election 1991 ===
1991 Uttar Pradesh Legislative Assembly election: Pithoragarh
Party	Candidate	Votes	%	±%
BJP	Krishna Chandra Punetha	31,806	45.89%	▲33.71
INC	Mahendra Singh Mahra	26,697	38.51%	▼4.64
UKD	Navin Chandra Murari	5,711	8.24%	New
JD	Umed Singh	1,381	1.99%	New
Independent	Jodh Singh	1,228	1.77%	New
Independent	Gagan Singh	1,027	1.48%	New
Independent	Laxman Singh	763	1.10%	New
Doordarshi Party	Girish Chandra	703	1.01%	▲0.04
Majority		5,109	7.38%	▲5.88
Turnout		72,795	43.21%	▼0.49
Registered electors		1,68,478		▲0.58
BJP gain from INC		Swing	▲33.71	

=== Assembly Election 1989 ===
1989 Uttar Pradesh Legislative Assembly election: Pithoragarh
Party	Candidate	Votes	%	±%
INC	Mahendra Singh Mahra	31,606	43.15%	▲5.21
Independent	Naveen Chandra	30,509	41.65%	New
BJP	Krishna Chandra Punetha	8,924	12.18%	▲1.17
Independent	Narayan Ram	761	1.04%	New
Independent	Prahlad Singh	733	1.00%	New
Doordarshi Party	Kishan Ram	711	0.97%	New
Majority		1,097	1.50%	▼4.45
Turnout		73,244	43.70%	▲11.80
Registered electors		1,67,507		▲25.71
INC gain from JP		Swing	▲5.21	

=== Zila Panchayat Election 1989 ===
January 1989 Pithoragarh Zila Parishad Election : Chairman
Party	Candidate	Votes	%	±%
INC	Mahendra Singh Mahra	Unopposed		
INC hold		Swing		
