= Lohaghat Assembly constituency =

Legislative constituency of Uttarakhand, India

Coordinates: 29.4°N 80.09°E

Lohaghat
- Constituency No. 54 for the Uttarakhand Legislative Assembly

Constituency details
- Country: India
- Region: North India
- State: Uttarakhand
- District: Champawat
- Lok Sabha constituency: Almora
- Total electors: 107,240
- Reservation: None

Member of Legislative Assembly
- 5th Uttarakhand Legislative Assembly
- Incumbent Khushal Singh Adhikari
- Party: Indian National Congress
- Elected year: 2022

Lohaghat Legislative Assembly constituency is one of the 70 Legislative Assembly constituencies of Uttarakhand state in northern India.

It is part of Champawat district. Khushal Singh Adhikari is the current MLA from Lohaghat.

== Members of the Legislative Assembly ==
Election	Member	Party
2002	Mahendra Singh Mahra	Indian National Congress
2007	Mahendra Singh Mahra	Indian National Congress
2012	Puran Singh Fartyal	Bharatiya Janata Party
2017	Puran Singh Fartyal	Bharatiya Janata Party
2022	Khushal Singh Adhikari	Indian National Congress

== Election results ==
=== 2027 Assembly election ===
2027 Uttarakhand Legislative Assembly election: Lohaghat
Party	Candidate	Votes	%	±%
INC				
BJP				
NOTA	None of the above			
Majority				
Turnout				
gain from		Swing		

=== Assembly Election 2022 ===
2022 Uttarakhand Legislative Assembly election: Lohaghat
Party	Candidate	Votes	%	±%
INC	Khushal Singh Adhikari	32,950	51.65%	▲5.71
BJP	Puran Singh Phartyal	26,912	42.18%	▼5.18
Independent	Himesh Chandra Kalkhuriya	1,247	1.95%	New
NOTA	None of the above	1,104	1.73%	▼0.43
AAP	Rajesh Singh Bisht	908	1.42%	New
SP	Nisar Khan	363	0.57%	New
Independent	Prakash Singh Dhami	178	0.28%	New
Independent	Dheeraj Singh Ladwal	138	0.22%	New
Margin of victory		6,038	9.46%	▲8.04
Turnout		63,800	58.56%	▲1.47
Registered electors		1,08,949		▲6.41
INC gain from BJP		Swing	▲4.28	

=== Assembly Election 2017 ===
2017 Uttarakhand Legislative Assembly election: Lohaghat
Party	Candidate	Votes	%	±%
BJP	Puran Singh Phartyal	27,685	47.37%	▼11.65
INC	Khushal Singh Adhikari	26,851	45.94%	▲9.29
NOTA	None of the above	1,261	2.16%	New
Independent	Prakash Singh	725	1.24%	New
Independent	Jyoti Prakash Tamta	724	1.24%	New
BSP	Devilal Sharma Alias Raju	713	1.22%	▼3.02
Independent	Rajendra Singh	379	0.65%	New
Margin of victory		834	1.43%	▼20.95
Turnout		58,450	57.09%	▲1.98
Registered electors		1,02,389		▲9.43
BJP hold		Swing	▼11.65	

=== Assembly Election 2012 ===
2012 Uttarakhand Legislative Assembly election: Lohaghat
Party	Candidate	Votes	%	±%
BJP	Puran Singh Phartyal	30,429	59.02%	▲26.58
INC	Mahendra Singh Mahra	18,894	36.65%	▲0.43
BSP	Govind Pandey	2,187	4.24%	▲1.65
Margin of victory		11,535	22.37%	▲18.59
Turnout		51,559	55.10%	▼1.89
Registered electors		93,567		
BJP gain from INC		Swing		

=== Assembly Election 2007 ===
2007 Uttarakhand Legislative Assembly election: Lohaghat
Party	Candidate	Votes	%	±%
INC	Mahendra Singh Mahra	15,433	36.21%	▲13.85
BJP	Krishna Chandra Punetha	13,823	32.43%	▲11.56
Independent	Lalit Mohan Pandey	4,635	10.88%	New
UKD	Prahlad Singh	3,209	7.53%	▼11.79
Independent	Kalyan Singh	1,529	3.59%	New
Independent	Sundar Singh	1,124	2.64%	New
BSP	Ambi Ram	1,103	2.59%	▼7.45
Independent	Suresh Tewari	1,052	2.47%	New
SP	Usha Devi	711	1.67%	▲0.44
Margin of victory		1,610	3.78%	▲2.29
Turnout		42,619	57.01%	▲5.15
Registered electors		74,780		
INC hold		Swing	▲13.85	

=== Assembly Election 2002 ===
2002 Uttaranchal Legislative Assembly election: Lohaghat
Party	Candidate	Votes	%	±%
INC	Mahendra Singh Mahra	7,648	22.36%	New
BJP	Krishna Chandra Punetha	7,138	20.87%	New
UKD	Navin Murari	6,609	19.32%	New
BSP	Puran Singh Phartyal	3,432	10.03%	New
Independent	Kailash Chandra Gahtori	2,767	8.09%	New
Independent	Hukam Singh Kunwar	1,839	5.38%	New
Independent	Har Govind Singh Bohra	1,614	4.72%	New
Independent	Abha Singh	844	2.47%	New
Independent	Lalit Lal Verma	807	2.36%	New
SP	Vipin Punetha	421	1.23%	New
Independent	Bhagwan Singh Mahra	401	1.17%	New
Independent	Lalit Prasad Pandey	345	1.01%	New
Independent	Ghyansham	339	0.99%	New
Margin of victory		510	1.49%	
Turnout		34,204	51.84%	
Registered electors		65,980		
INC win (new seat)				

== See also ==
- List of constituencies of the Uttarakhand Legislative Assembly
- Champawat district
