= Sarju =

Sarju Kumaoni: सरज्यू, Hindi: सरयू
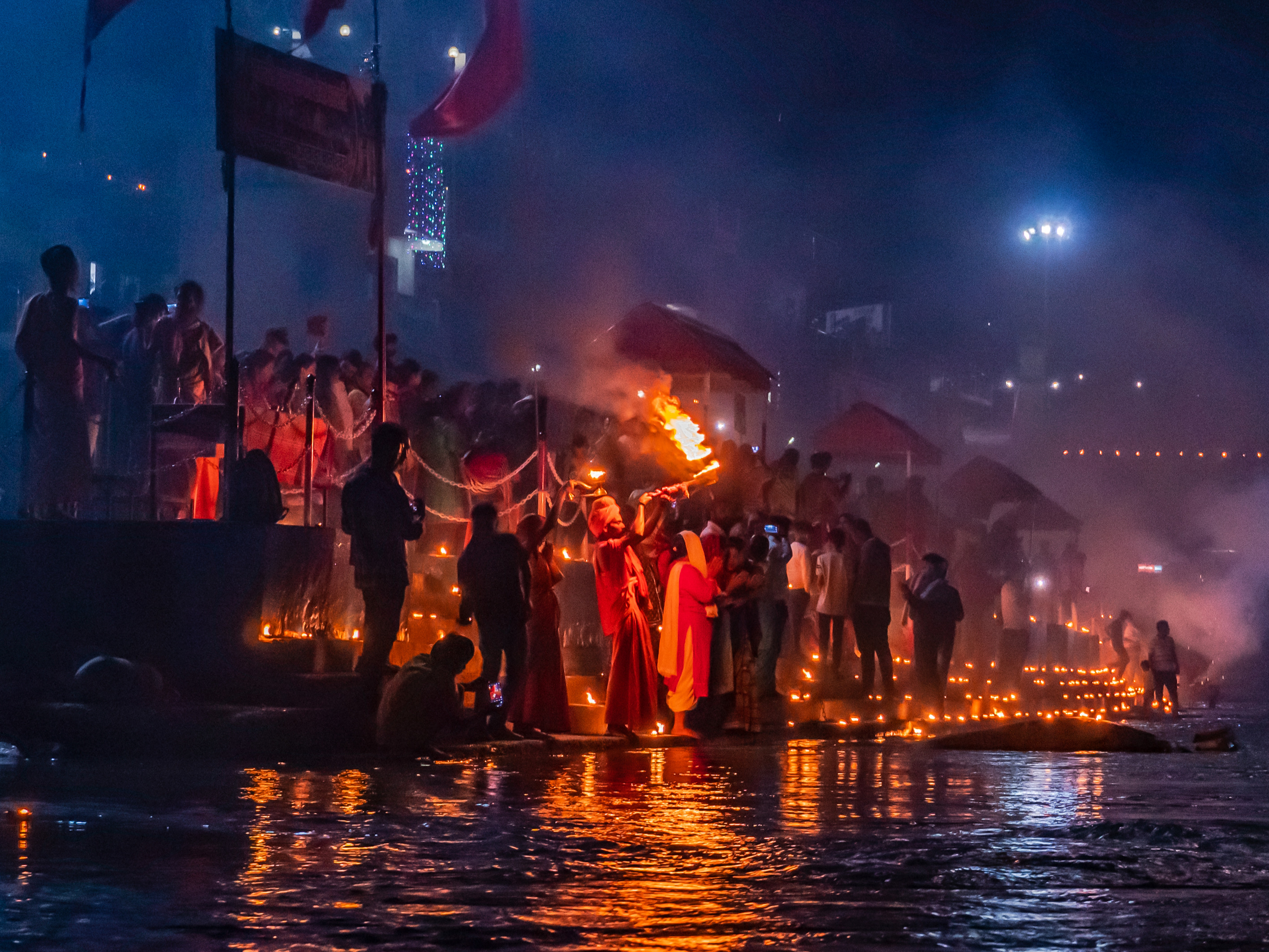
- Aarti at Sarju Ghat, Bageshwar

Location
- Country: India
- State: Uttarakhand
- region: Kumaon

Physical characteristics
- Source
  - location: Sarmul, 15 km south of Nanda Kot
  - coordinates: 30°7′58″N 80°1′56″E
  - elevation: 3,000 m (9,800 ft)
- Mouth
  - location: Sharda River, Uttarakhand, India
  - coordinates: 29°26′38″N 80°14′33″E
  - elevation: 429 m (1,407 ft)
- Length: 130 km (81 mi)

Basin features
- Tributaries
  - left: Ramganga, Punger
  - right: Gomati, Panar, Lahor

The Sarju (Kumaoni: सरज्यू, Hindi: सरयू), also known as Saryu, is a major river draining Central Kumaon region in the Indian state of Uttarakhand. Originating from Sarmul, Sarju flows through the cities of Kapkot, Bageshwar and Seraghat before joining Mahakali at Pancheshwar. The Sarju is the largest tributary of the Sharda River. The river forms the South-eastern border between the districts of Pithoragarh and Almora. Temperate and sub-Tropical forests cover the entire Catchment area of the River.

== Etymology ==
According to the Ramayana (Balakanda 24/7-10), the name of this river is derived from 'Sarovar'/Lake (Lake Manasarovar). The name is a noun derived from the Sanskrit root सृ sṛ "to flow". saráyu- as a masculine noun means "air, wind". In the feminine it is the name of the river.

== Hindu Scriptures ==
=== Ved ===
The name of Sarju /Sarayu river is found in Rigveda (4.30.18) and (5.53.9).

Uta tyā sadya āryā sarayorindra pāratah.

Arņācitrarathāvadhīḥ.

Translation- "O Indra! You have slain at once those two Āryas, Arṇa and Citraratha, (dwelling) on the opposite (bank) of the Sarayu."

mā vo rasānitabhā kubhā krumur mā vaḥ sindhur ni rīramat | mā vaḥ pari ṣṭhāt sarayuḥ purīṣiṇy asme it sumnam astu vaḥ

Translation- Let not the Rasa, the Anitabhā, the Kubhā, or the wide-roving ocean delay you; let not the watery Sarayu oppose you; may the happiness of your (approach) be ours

=== Ramayana ===
According to the Ramayana (Balkand 24/7-10), the sarju river originated from Lake Manasarovar , flows through Ayodhya and meets the Ganges River.

== Course ==
The Sarju rises at a place known as Sarmul (or Sarmool), which is located in the extreme north of the Bageshwar district of Uttarakhand. The source of the river is situated at 30°7′58″N 80°1′56″E on the southern slope of a ridge of the Nanda Kot and is separated on the east from the source of Ramganga and on the west from the sources of Kuphini (the eastern branch of Pindar River) by spurs leading down from the mass culminating at the Nanda Kot peak. It flows initially around 50 km (31 mi) in southwest direction by the Kumaon Himalayas where it receives Kanalgadh stream from the right and Punger river from the left. About 2 km (1.2 mi) further downstream, the river receives Lahor river from the right. Then the river turns towards south and flows through the city of Bageshwar, where it receives Gomati from the right.

The Sarju flows to the lower 65 km in mainly southeastern direction. Much of the drainage of Gangolihat region of Pithoragarh district flows into the river via Bhadrapatigad stream, which flows into it from the left. Similarly, several streams join it from right draining much of the Chaugarkha region situated in Almora district; notable ones being Gatgadh, Jalairgadh, Bhaurgadh, Alaknadi and Saniaungadh. About 55 km (34 mi) downstream from its confluence with Gomati in Bageshwar, it receives the Panar river from the right. A small river Jaingan gets merge into Sarju river at Seraghat in Almora-Pithoragarh border. About five Km further downstream, at 20 km (12 mi) above its mouth, Ramganga meets the left side on the Sarju at Rameshwar, situated at an elevation of 1,500 ft (460 m). Finally Sarju reaches at Pancheshwar at the Nepalese border to Sharda River after travelling a total of 130 km (81 mi).

== Geology ==
Sarju transfers a sedimental load of 498.4 kg/sec during the peak of raining season.

Water Quality Characteristics of Sarju during water years 1987 and 1988
Parameter	pH	Alkalinity	Hardness	Conductivity	Calcium	Magnesium	Sodium	Potassium	Chloride	Sulphate
Value	7.9	111.2	101.32	137.11	18.89	11.11	3.50	1.80	8.10	2.41

== Tributaries ==
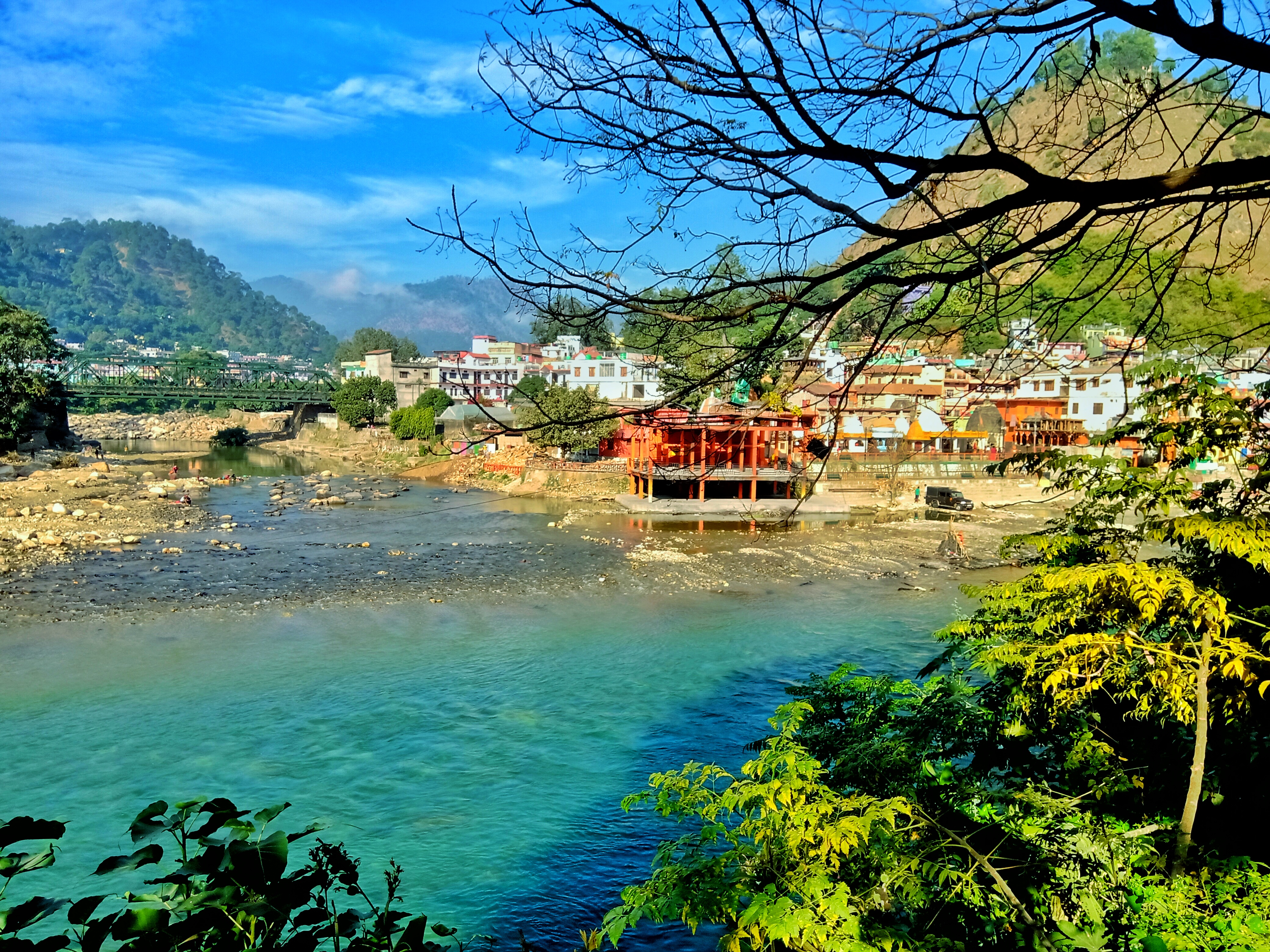
confluence of Gomati and Sarju at Bageshwar.

=== Gomati ===
Gomati river originates in the higher reaches of Bhatkot and merges into Sarju at Bageshwar. It flows through the Katyur Valley which constitutes a major Agricultural zone of Kumaon.

=== Kuloor ===
The Kuloor river rises above the Bhadrkali Temple near Sani-Udiyar, and flows through Rawatsera, Bans Patan and Ganai Gangoli, before joining the Sarju at Seraghat.

=== Punger ===
Punger river rises near village Sangar and joins Sarju from the left at Sartana.

=== Lahor ===
Lahor is a small river that joins Sarju from the right.

=== Panar ===
Panar originates on the northern slopes of the Mornaula Range, south-east of Almora. Panar joins Sarju near Rameshwar.

=== Ramganga ===
Ramganga East is the largest tributary of Sarju. It originates from the Namik Glacier in Pithoragarh district of Uttarakhand and flows towards Southeast. The river is fed by numerous small and big rivers and finally joins river Sarju at Rameshwar.

== Gallery ==
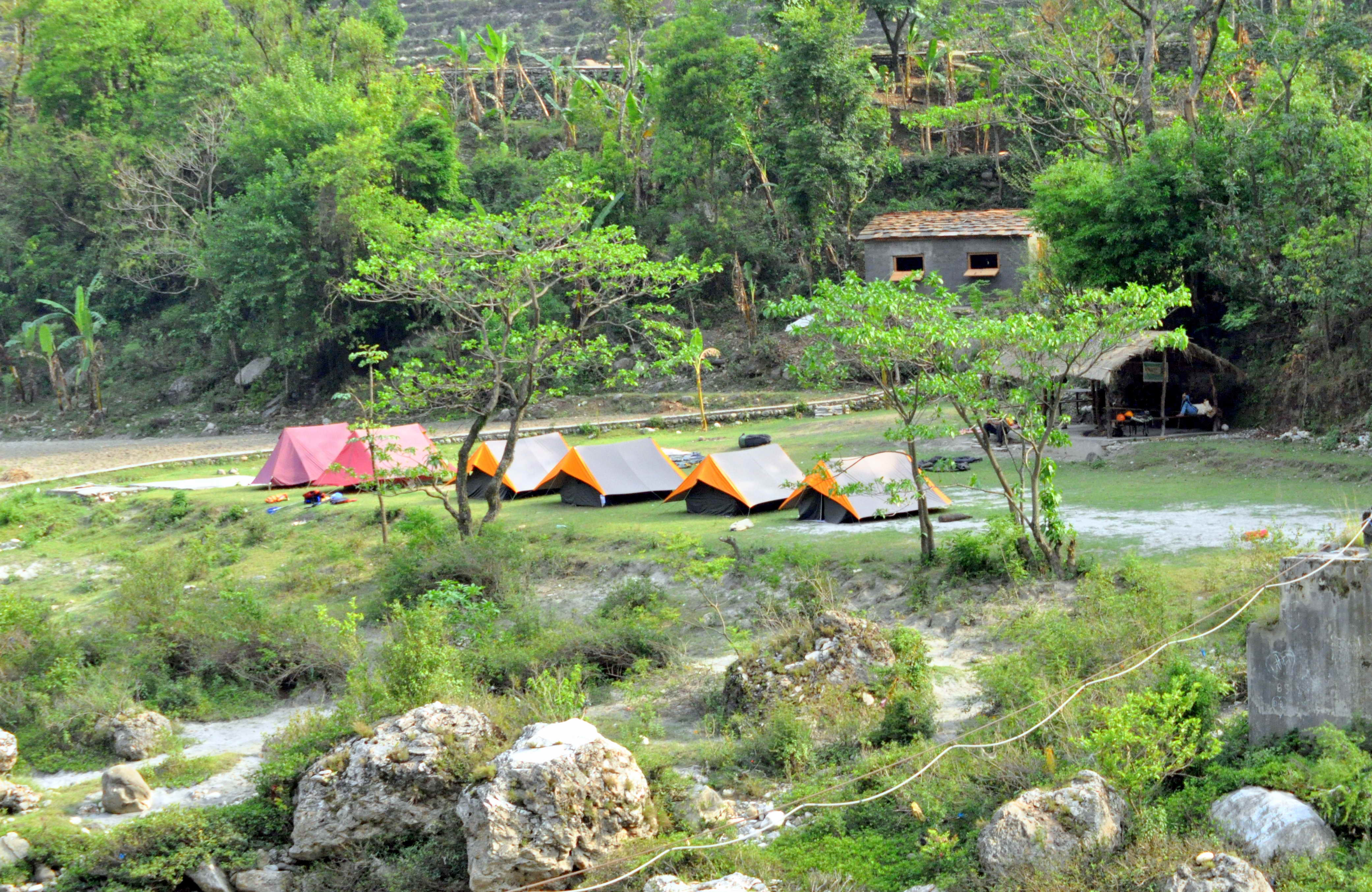
Camping on Saryu river

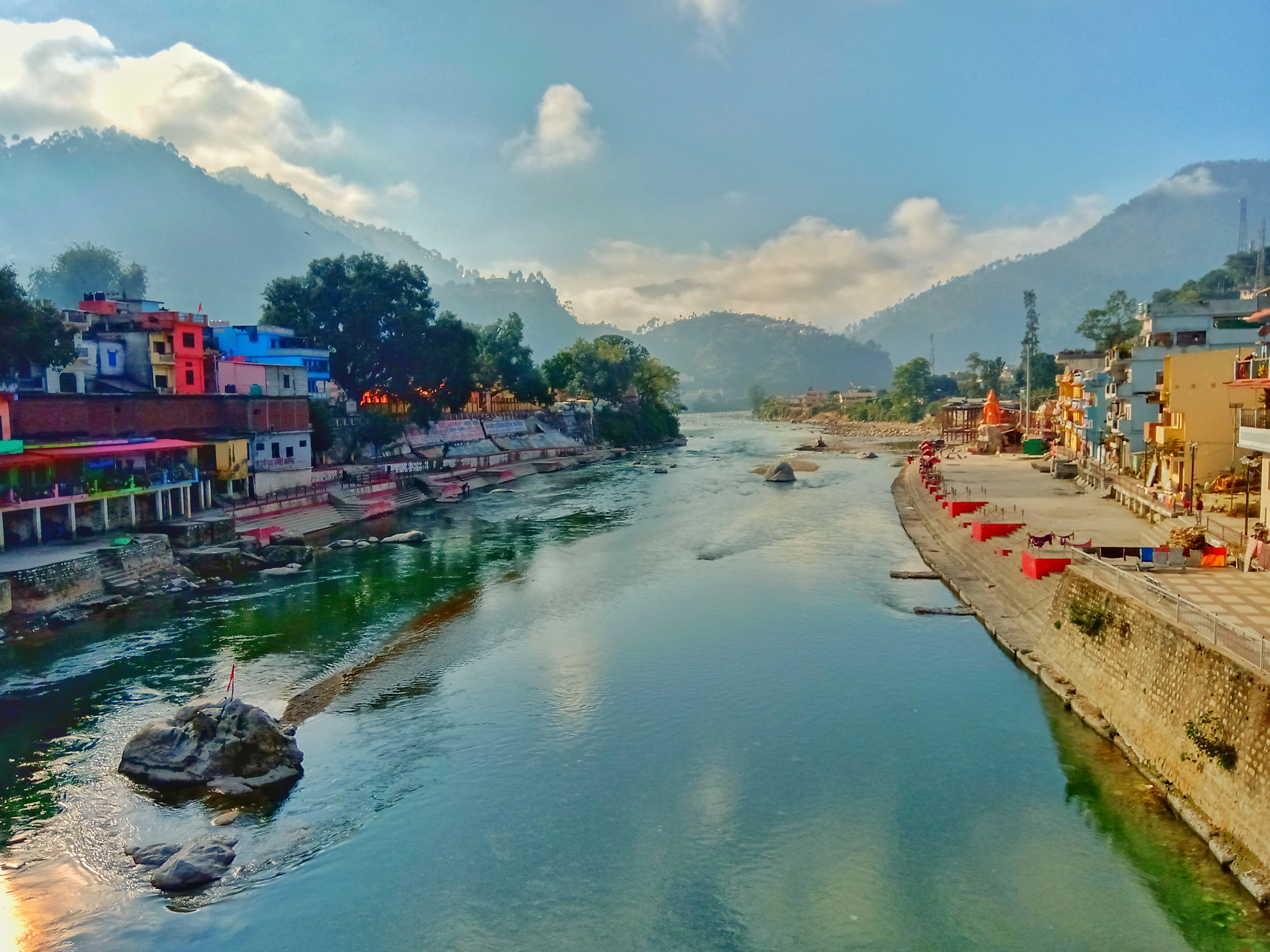
Saryu river at Bageshwar

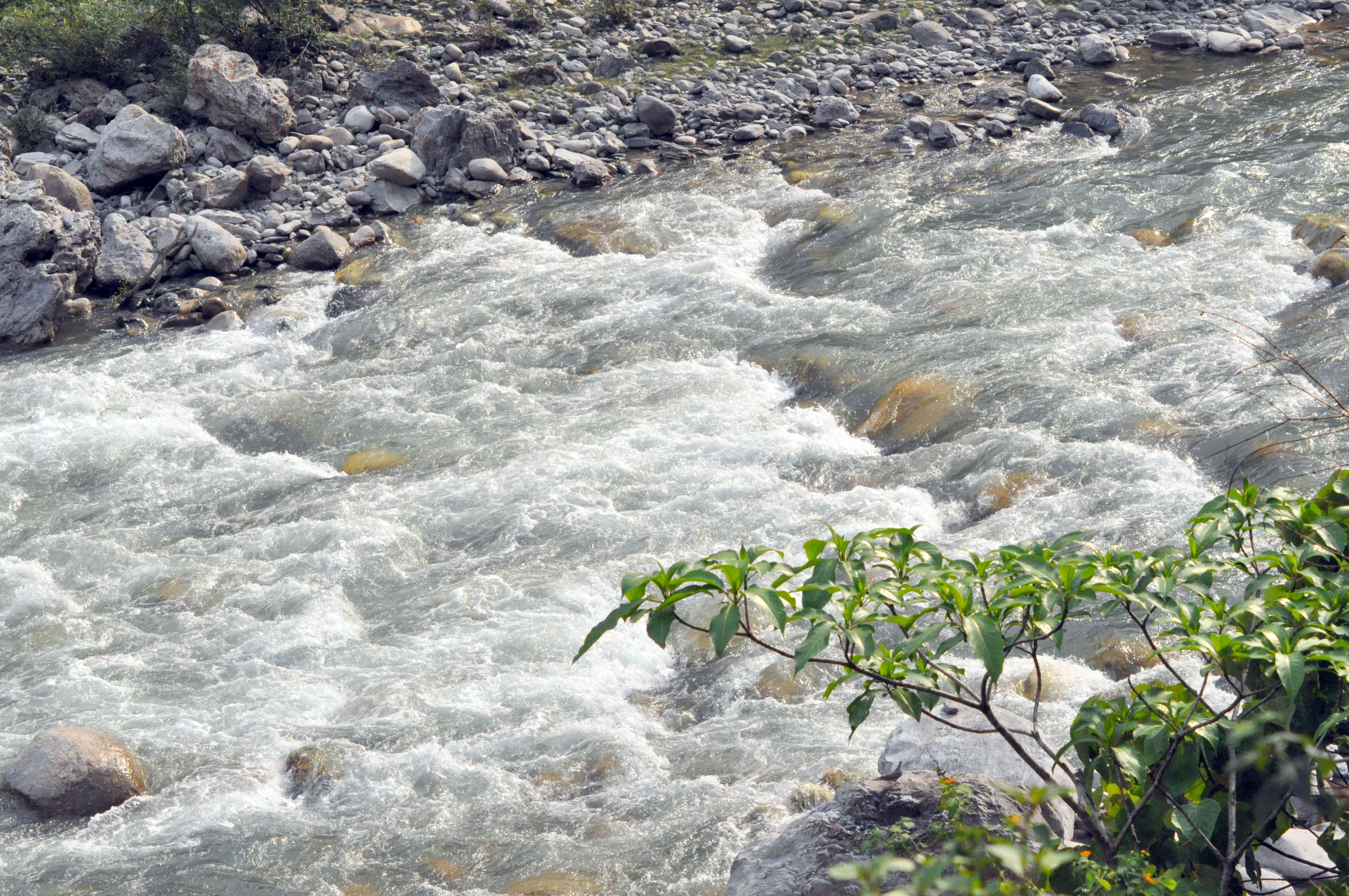
Close-up view of Sarju water flowing

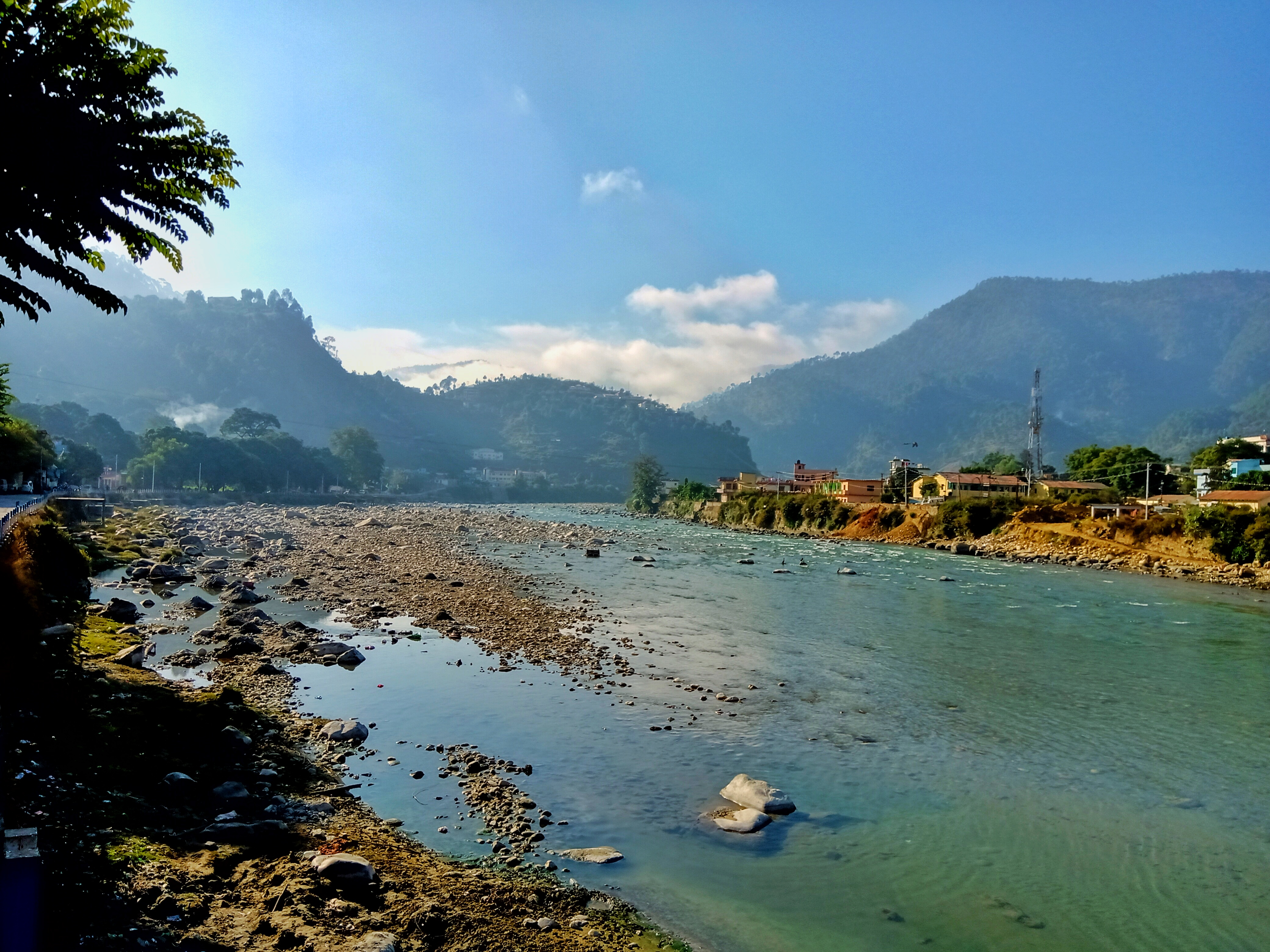
Saryu river at Bageshwar

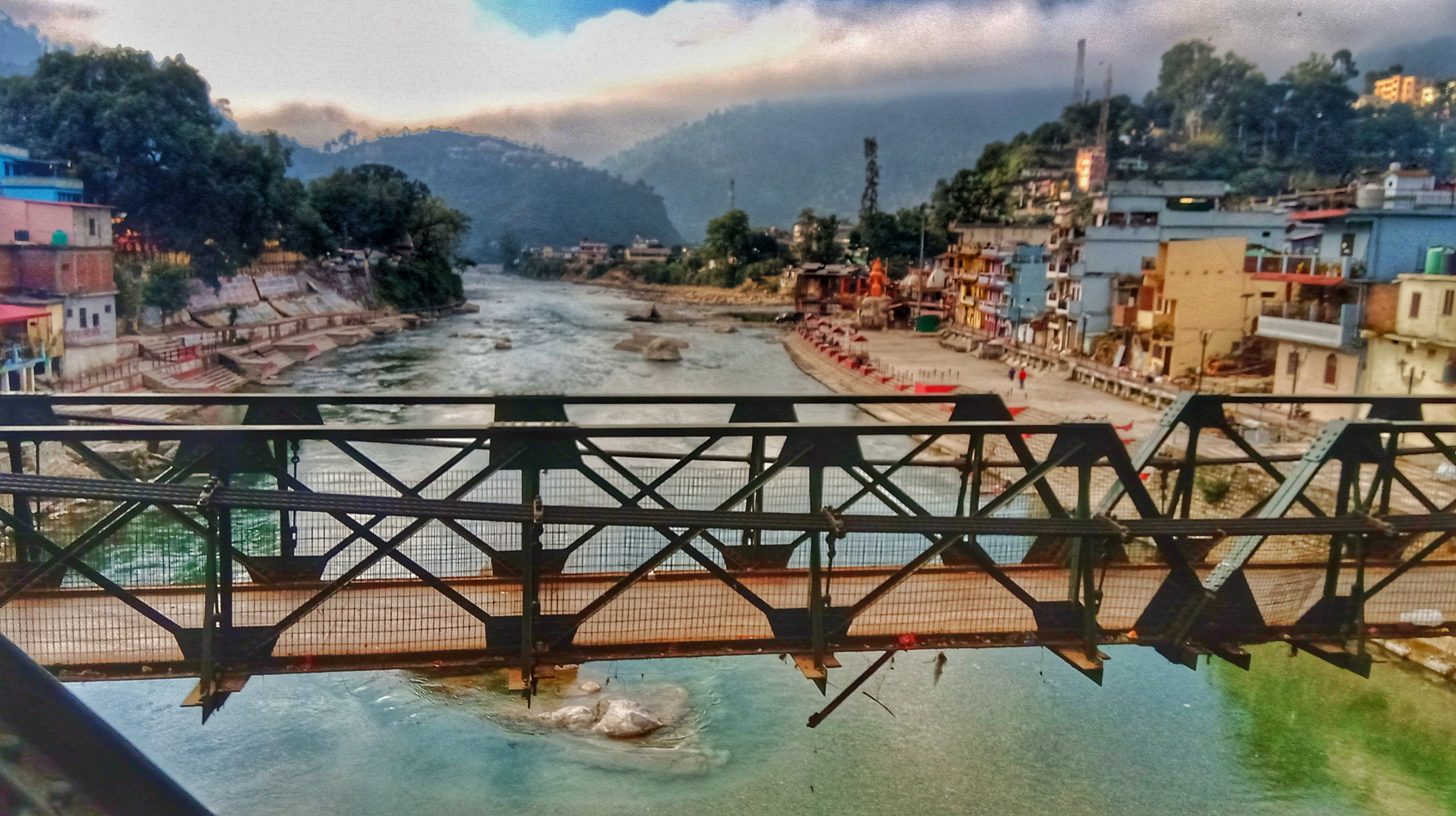
Suspension Bridge over Saryu river at Bageshwar

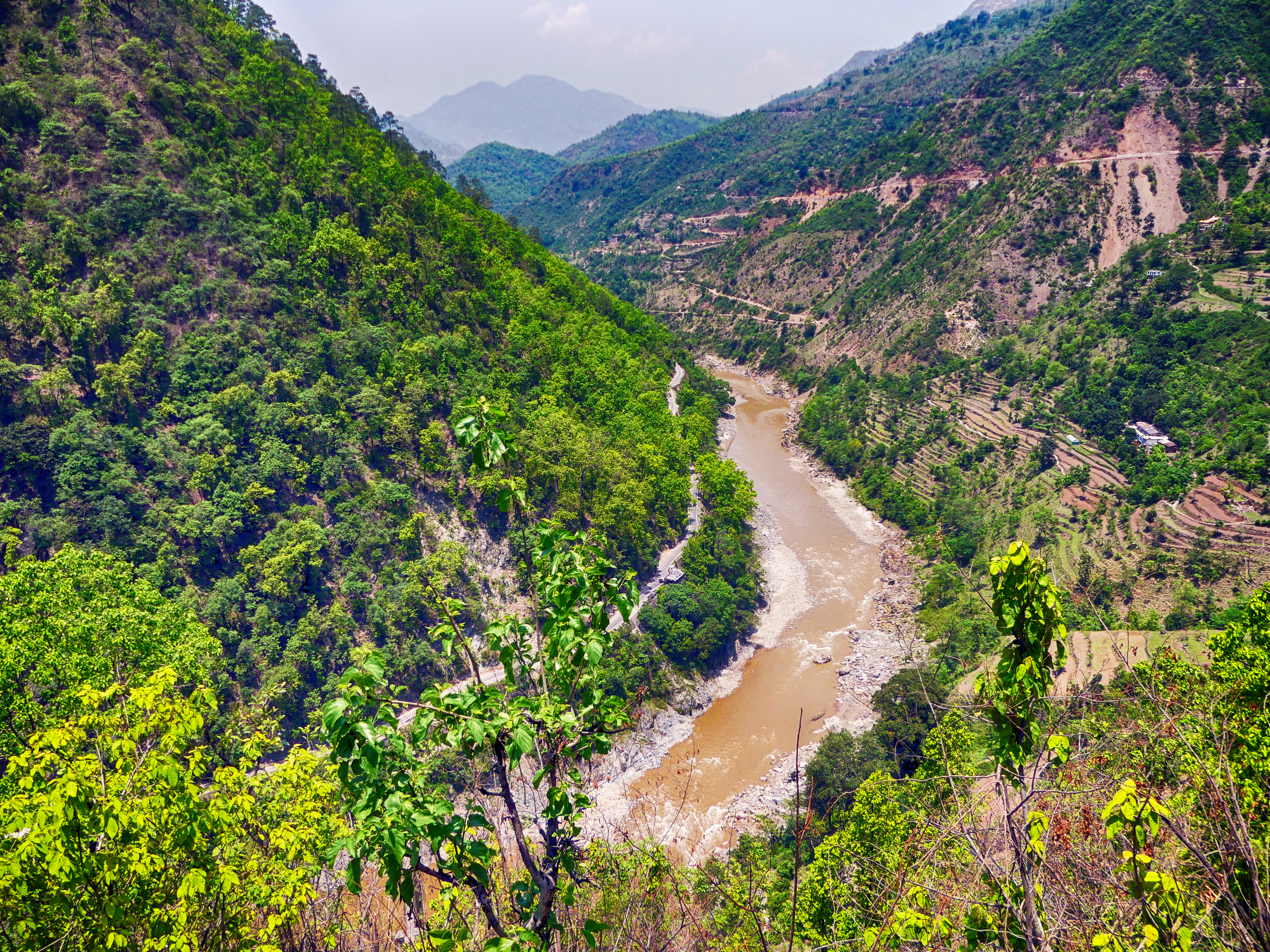
Sarayu River

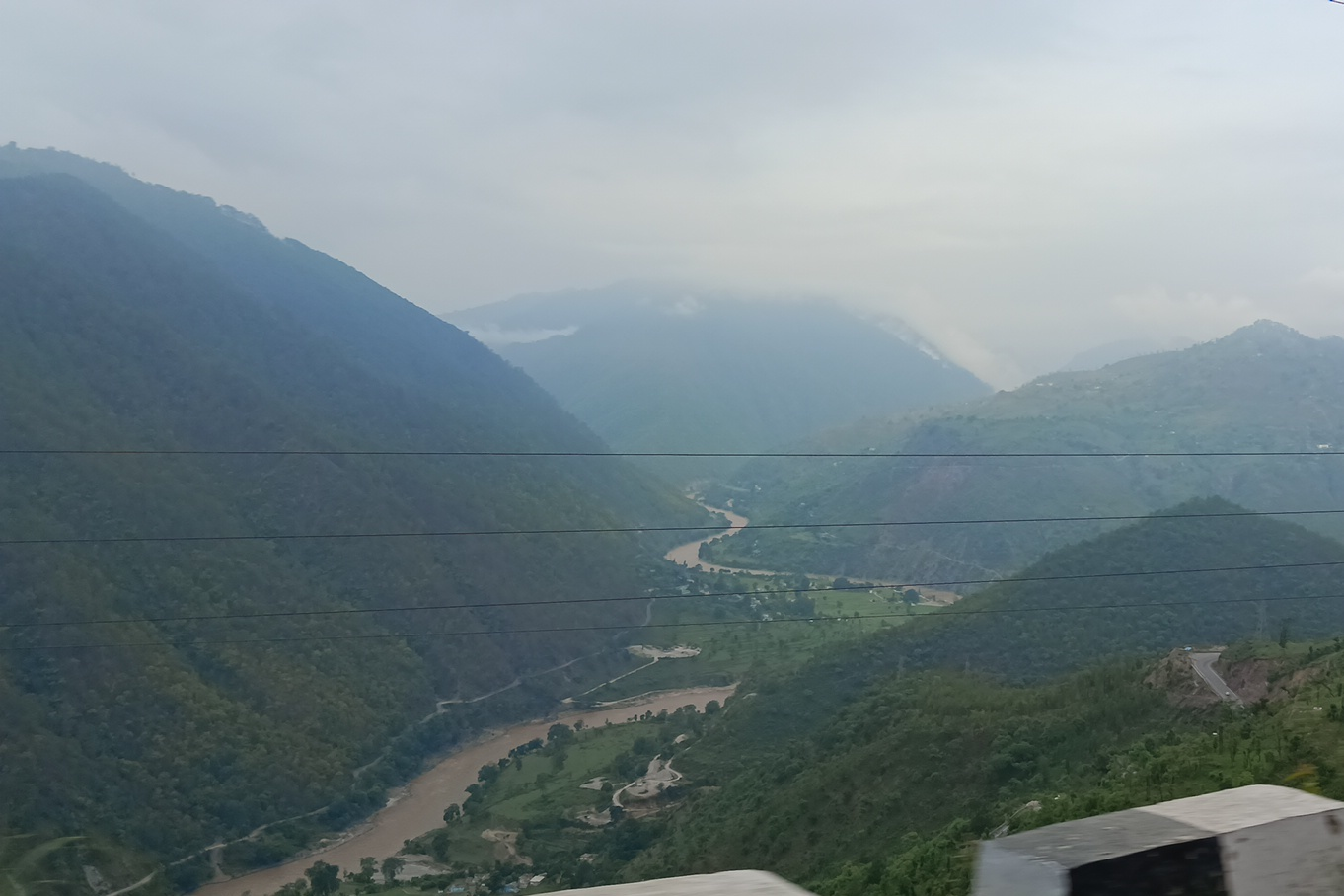
Sarju River at Ghat, Pithoragarh
