= Pithoragarh Assembly constituency =

Legislative assembly constituency in Uttarakhand, India

Coordinates: 29.58°N 80.22°E

Pithoragarh
- Constituency No. 44 for the Uttarakhand Legislative Assembly

Constituency details
- Country: India
- Region: North India
- State: Uttarakhand
- District: Pithoragarh
- Lok Sabha constituency: Almora
- Established: 1952
- Total electors: 109,705
- Reservation: None

Member of Legislative Assembly
- 5th Uttarakhand Legislative Assembly
- Incumbent Mayukh Mahar
- Party: Indian National Congress
- Elected year: 2022

INC is the most successful political party in Pithoragarh assembly constituency.
1. INC (11 terms) (55.0%)
2. BJP (6 terms) (30.0%)
3. JP (2 terms) (10.0%)
4. INC(O) (1 term) (5.00%)

Pithoragarh Legislative Assembly constituency is one of the 70 Legislative Assembly constituencies of Uttarakhand state in India.

It is part of Pithoragarh district.

== Members of the Legislative Assembly ==
Year	Member	Party
1952 (Note: From 1952 to 1962 Pithoragarh was a 2-member constituency.)	Narendra Singh Bisht	Indian National Congress
1952	Khushi Ram	Indian National Congress
1957	Narendra Singh Bisht	Indian National Congress
1957	Khushi Ram	Indian National Congress
Major boundary changes
1962	Narendra Singh Bisht	Indian National Congress
Major boundary changes
1967	Narendra Singh Bisht	Indian National Congress
1969	Narendra Singh Bisht	Indian National Congress
1972 By-election	Hira Singh Bora	Indian National Congress
1974	Dayakishan Pandey	Indian National Congress
1977	Kamal Kishan Pandey	Janata Party
1980	Narendra Singh Bisht	Indian National Congress
1985	Kamal Kishan Pandey	Janata Party
1989	Mahendra Singh Mahra	Indian National Congress
1991	Krishna Chandra Punetha	Bharatiya Janata Party
1993	Mahendra Singh Mahra	Indian National Congress
1996	Krishna Chandra Punetha	Bharatiya Janata Party
Major boundary changes
2002	Prakash Pant	Bharatiya Janata Party
2007	Prakash Pant	Bharatiya Janata Party
Major boundary changes
2012	Mayukh Mahar	Indian National Congress
2017	Prakash Pant	Bharatiya Janata Party
2019 By-election	Chandra Pant	Bharatiya Janata Party
2022	Mayukh Mahar	Indian National Congress

== Election results ==
=== 2027 Assembly election ===
2027 Uttarakhand Legislative Assembly election: Pithoragarh
Party	Candidate	Votes	%	±%
INC				
BJP				
UKD	Kashi Singh Airy			
NOTA	None of the above			
Majority				
Turnout				
gain from		Swing		

=== Assembly Election 2022 ===
2022 Uttarakhand Legislative Assembly election: Pithoragarh
Party	Candidate	Votes	%	±%
INC	Mayukh Mahar	33,269	47.48%	▲1.60
BJP	Chandra Pant	27,215	38.84%	▼13.60
Independent	Nitin Markana	6,585	9.40%	New
AAP	Chandra Prakash Punera	730	1.04%	New
ASP(KR)	Kartik Tamta	717	1.02%	New
NOTA	None of the above	558	0.80%	▼0.90
BSP	Khursid Ahmad	526	0.75%	New
SP	Virendera Vir Vikram Singh	470	0.67%	▼1.01
Margin of victory		6,054	8.64%	▲2.07
Turnout		70,070	61.49%	▲15.84
Rejected ballots		753	1.06%	▲0.73
Registered electors		1,13,947		▲3.63
INC gain from BJP		Swing	▼4.97	

=== Assembly By-election 2019 ===
2019 Uttarakhand Legislative Assembly by-election : Pithoragarh
Party	Candidate	Votes	%	±%
BJP	Chandra Pant	26,086	52.44%	▲3.28
INC	Anju Lunthi	22,819	45.88%	▲0.72
NOTA	None of the above	844	1.70%	▲0.10
SP	Manoj Kumar Bhatt	835	1.68%	▲1.52
Margin of victory		3,267	6.57%	▲2.56
Turnout		49,740	45.65%	▼17.17
Rejected ballots		167	0.33%	
Registered electors		1,09,957		▲2.41
BJP hold		Swing	▲3.28	

=== Assembly Election 2017 ===
2017 Uttarakhand Legislative Assembly election: Pithoragarh
Party	Candidate	Votes	%	±%
BJP	Prakash Pant	32,941	49.16%	▲12.79
INC	Mayukh Mahar	30,257	45.15%	▼14.31
NOTA	None of the above	1,072	1.60%	New
Independent	Lalit Mohan Bhatt	613	0.91%	New
Independent	Mahendra Singh	529	0.79%	New
BSP	Raghuvar Ram	519	0.77%	▼0.83
UKD	Sushma Mathur	304	0.46%	New
Independent	Manoj Kumar Joshi	126	0.19%	New
Independent	Krishnand Kapri	111	0.17%	New
SP	Ramesh Bisht	108	0.16%	New
Independent	Gulzar Khan	78	0.12%	New
Margin of victory		2,684	4.01%	▼19.09
Turnout		67,007	62.41%	▼2.83
Registered electors		1,07,371		
BJP gain from INC		Swing	▼10.30	

=== Assembly Election 2012 ===
2012 Uttarakhand Legislative Assembly election: Pithoragarh
Party	Candidate	Votes	%	±%
INC	Mayukh Mahar	33,976	59.46%	▲19.95
BJP	Prakash Pant	20,779	36.37%	▼14.49
BSP	Ram Datt Joshi	918	1.61%	▲0.79
Independent	Guljar Khan	686	1.20%	New
SS	Santosh Rawat	542	0.95%	New
Margin of victory		13,197	23.10%	▲11.75
Turnout		57,138	65.24%	▲2.59
Registered electors		87,580		
INC gain from BJP		Swing	▲8.60	

=== Assembly Election 2007 ===
2007 Uttarakhand Legislative Assembly election: Pithoragarh
Party	Candidate	Votes	%	±%
BJP	Prakash Pant	26,855	50.86%	▲11.71
INC	Ravindra Singh (Kiran Maldar)	20,865	39.52%	▲15.34
Independent	Shankar Ram Kohli	898	1.70%	New
NCP	Umesh Chandra	784	1.48%	New
BJSH	Bhupendra Singh	669	1.27%	New
SP	Saleem Khan	636	1.20%	▲0.19
Independent	Ram Datt Joshi	574	1.09%	New
UKD	Jodh Singh	453	0.86%	▼21.97
BSP	Jagdish Chandra Lohni	433	0.82%	▼3.84
Independent	Gulzar Khan	403	0.76%	New
Independent	Ratan Ram Dayal (Ratan Dhan)	231	0.40%	New
Margin of victory		5,990	11.34%	▼3.63
Turnout		52,801	62.71%	▲7.74
Registered electors		84,277		▲13.13
BJP hold		Swing	▲11.71	

=== Assembly Election 2002 ===
2002 Uttaranchal Legislative Assembly election: Pithoragarh
Party	Candidate	Votes	%	±%
BJP	Prakash Pant	16,015	39.15%	▼2.15
INC	Mayukh Mahar	9,889	24.18%	▼5.02
UKD	Ravindra Singh Bisht (Kiran Maldar)	9,337	22.83%	▲12.53
BSP	Mahendra Singh Lunthi	1,907	4.66%	New
Independent	Ratan Ram Dayal (Ratan Dhan)	1,027	2.51%	New
Independent	Ishwari Dutt	930	2.27%	New
Independent	Chandra Prakash (Channu)	494	1.21%	New
SP	Basant Ballabh	413	1.01%	New
LJP	Rajendra Singh	365	0.89%	New
CPI(ML)L	Mukesh Pant	293	0.72%	New
Independent	Captain Pramod Singh	233	0.57%	New
Margin of victory		6,126	14.98%	▲2.89
Turnout		40,903	54.93%	▲9.83
Registered electors		74,494		▼63.39
BJP hold		Swing	▼3.08	

=== Assembly Election 1996 ===
1996 Uttar Pradesh Legislative Assembly election: Pithoragarh
Party	Candidate	Votes	%	±%
BJP	Krishna Chandra Punetha	37,221	41.30%	▲1.09
INC	Mahendra Singh Mahra	26,276	29.20%	▼18.40
AIIC(T)	Laxman Singh	13,998	15.50%	New
UKD	Chandra Shekhar Kapri	9,280	10.30%	▲6.31
Margin of victory		10,945	12.10%	▲4.71
Turnout		91,772	45.10%	▲3.88
Registered electors		2,03,454		▲13.99
BJP gain from INC		Swing	▲9.75	

=== Assembly Election 1993 ===
1993 Uttar Pradesh Legislative Assembly election: Pithoragarh
Party	Candidate	Votes	%	±%
INC	Mahendra Singh Mahra	35,025	47.60%	▲9.09
BJP	Krishna Chandra Punetha	29,584	40.21%	▼5.68
UKD	Chandra Shekhar Kapri	2,933	3.99%	▼4.25
SP	Hira Singh Bora	2,454	3.33%	New
Independent	Harish Singh	527	0.72%	New
Doordarshi Party	Dev Shankar	524	0.71%	▼0.30
Independent	Hari Ram	462	0.63%	New
Independent	Hem Chandra Pande	411	0.56%	New
Independent	Amba Datt	385	0.52%	New
Majority		5,441	7.39%	▲0.01
Turnout		73,584	41.22%	▼1.99
Registered electors		1,78,491		▲5.94
INC gain from BJP		Swing	▲9.09	

=== Assembly Election 1991 ===
1991 Uttar Pradesh Legislative Assembly election: Pithoragarh
Party	Candidate	Votes	%	±%
BJP	Krishna Chandra Punetha	31,806	45.89%	▲33.71
INC	Mahendra Singh Mahra	26,697	38.51%	▼4.64
UKD	Navin Chandra Murari	5,711	8.24%	New
JD	Umed Singh	1,381	1.99%	New
Independent	Jodh Singh	1,228	1.77%	New
Independent	Gagan Singh	1,027	1.48%	New
Independent	Laxman Singh	763	1.10%	New
Doordarshi Party	Girish Chandra	703	1.01%	▲0.04
Majority		5,109	7.38%	▲5.88
Turnout		72,795	43.21%	▼0.49
Registered electors		1,68,478		▲0.58
BJP gain from INC		Swing	▲33.71	

=== Assembly Election 1989 ===
1989 Uttar Pradesh Legislative Assembly election: Pithoragarh
Party	Candidate	Votes	%	±%
INC	Mahendra Singh Mahra	31,606	43.15%	▲5.21
Independent	Naveen Chandra	30,509	41.65%	New
BJP	Krishna Chandra Punetha	8,924	12.18%	▲1.17
Independent	Narayan Ram	761	1.04%	New
Independent	Prahlad Singh	733	1.00%	New
Doordarshi Party	Kishan Ram	711	0.97%	New
Majority		1,097	1.50%	▼4.45
Turnout		73,244	43.70%	▲11.80
Registered electors		1,67,507		▲25.71
INC gain from JP		Swing	▲5.21	

=== Assembly Election 1985 ===
1985 Uttar Pradesh Legislative Assembly election: Pithoragarh
Party	Candidate	Votes	%	±%
JP	Kamal Kishan Pandey	18,662	43.89%	▲17.53
INC	Ratna Bisht	16,133	37.94%	▼6.06
BJP	Mahendra Singh Pal	4,683	11.01%	▲3.97
Independent	Chandra Singh	1,180	2.78%	New
Independent	Jagat Singh	1,003	2.36%	New
Independent	Kedar Singh	859	2.02%	New
Majority		2,529	5.95%	▼11.69
Turnout		42,520	31.90%	▲5.29
Registered electors		1,33,250		▲13.06
JP gain from INC		Swing	▲11.80	

=== Assembly Election 1980 ===
1980 Uttar Pradesh Legislative Assembly election: Pithoragarh
Party	Candidate	Votes	%	±%
INC	Narendra Singh Bisht	13,477	44.00%	▲12.87
JP	Kamal Kishan Pandey	8,074	26.36%	▼13.72
Independent	Hira Singh Bora	5,451	17.79%	New
BJP	Madhava Nand Joshi	2,158	7.04%	New
Independent	Laxmi Prasad	740	2.42%	New
Independent	Hari Ram Arya	730	2.38%	New
Majority		5,403	17.64%	▲9.39
Turnout		31,359	26.61%	▼0.99
Registered electors		1,17,858		▲6.94
INC gain from JP		Swing	▲12.87	

=== Assembly Election 1977 ===
1977 Uttar Pradesh Legislative Assembly election: Pithoragarh
Party	Candidate	Votes	%	±%
JP	Kamal Kishan Pandey	11,930	40.08%	New
INC	Jodh Singh Dhek	9,476	31.83%	▼9.09
Independent	Laxmi Prasad Verma	3,435	11.54%	New
Independent	Main Singh Mehta	1,784	5.99%	New
Independent	Mani Ram	1,326	4.45%	New
Independent	Janardan Pant	678	2.28%	New
Independent	Shiv Kumar Pant	629	2.11%	New
Independent	B. R. Tamta	241	0.81%	New
Independent	Anand Ram	147	0.49%	New
Independent	Jiwan Lal Chaudhary	94	0.32%	New
Majority		2,454	8.25%	▼9.91
Turnout		30,416	27.60%	▼21.70
Registered electors		1,10,211		▲31.62
JP gain from INC(O)		Swing	▲40.08	

=== Assembly Election 1974 ===
1974 Uttar Pradesh Legislative Assembly election: Pithoragarh
Party	Candidate	Votes	%	±%
INC(O)	Dayakishan Pandey	24,388	59.08%	New
INC	Hira Singh Bora	16,889	40.92%	▼28.18
Margin of victory		7,499	18.16%	▼20.04
Turnout		41,277	49.30%	▲16.26
Registered electors		83,732		▲18.56
INC(O) gain from INC		Swing	▼28.18	

=== Assembly By-election 1972 ===
1972 Legislative Assembly by-election : Pithoragarh
Party	Candidate	Votes	%	±%
INC	Hira Singh Bora	16,121	69.10%	▲14.62
Independent	P. Singh	7,210	30.90%	New
Margin of victory		8,911	38.20%	▲29.24
Turnout		23,331	33.04%	▼0.50
Registered electors		70,622		▲0.00
INC hold		Swing	▲14.62	

=== Assembly Election 1969 ===
1969 Uttar Pradesh Legislative Assembly election: Pithoragarh
Party	Candidate	Votes	%	±%
INC	Narendra Singh Bisht	12,905	54.48%	▲1.24
ABJS	Mohan Singh Chand	10,781	45.52%	▲14.53
Margin of victory		2,124	8.96%	▼13.29
Turnout		23,686	33.54%	▲3.02
Registered electors		70,622		▲6.74
INC hold		Swing	▲1.24	

=== Assembly Election 1967 ===
1967 Uttar Pradesh Legislative Assembly election: Pithoragarh
Party	Candidate	Votes	%	±%
INC	Narendra Singh Bisht	10,749	53.24%	▲10.65
ABJS	B. D. Patani	6,257	30.99%	New
SWA	Jayant Lal	3,184	15.77%	New
Margin of victory		4,492	22.25%	▲11.36
Turnout		20,190	30.52%	▼0.88
Registered electors		66,160		Steady
INC hold		Swing	▲10.65	

=== Assembly Election 1962 ===
1962 Uttar Pradesh Legislative Assembly election: Pithoragarh
Party	Candidate	Votes	%	±%
INC	Narendra Singh Bisht	8,847	42.59%	▲9.14
PSP	Lilaram Sharma	6,584	31.70%	▲11.51
Independent	Govind Singh	5,342	25.71%	New
Margin of victory		2,263	10.89%	▲4.44
Turnout		20,773	31.40%	▼2.62
Registered electors		66,160		▼49.75
INC hold		Swing	▲9.14	

=== Assembly Election 1957 ===
1957 Uttar Pradesh Legislative Assembly election: Pithoragarh (Note: From 1952 to 1962 Pithoragarh was a 2-member constituency. In 1957 election, one seat was general while the other was reserved for SC.)
Party	Candidate	Votes	%	±%
INC	Narendra Singh Bisht	14,984	33.45%	▼0.57
INC	Khushi Ram (SC)	11,931	26.63%	▼6.43
PSP	Durga Datt	9,042	20.18%	New
PSP	Jayant Lal (SC)	8,835	19.72%	New
Margin of victory		2,889	6.45%	▼8.67
Turnout		44,792	34.02%	▲9.71
Registered electors		1,31,650		▲7.49
INC hold		Swing	▼0.57	
INC hold		Swing	▼6.43	

=== Assembly Election 1952 ===
1952 Uttar Pradesh Legislative Assembly election: Pithoragarh cum Champawat (Note: From 1952 to 1962 Pithoragarh was a 2-member constituency.)
Party	Candidate	Votes	%	±%
INC	Narendra Singh Bisht	10,131	34.02%	New
INC	Khushi Ram	9,845	33.06%	New
Socialist	Durga Singh	5,342	17.94%	New
Independent	Govind Singh	4,461	14.98%	New
Margin of victory		4,503	15.12%	New
Turnout		29,779	24.31%	New
Registered electors		1,22,481		New
INC win (new seat)				
INC win (new seat)				

== See also ==
- List of constituencies of the Uttarakhand Legislative Assembly
- Pithoragarh district
