= Chandra Pant =

Indian politician & teacher (born 1968)

Member of the Uttarakhand Legislative Assembly
- In office 2019–2022
- Preceded by: Prakash Pant
- Succeeded by: Mayukh Mahar
- Constituency: Pithoragarh

Personal details
- Born: 15 January 1968 (age 58) Pithoragarh
- Party: Bharatiya Janata Party
- Spouse: Prakash Pant (m.1989; died 2019)
- Education: M.A. and B.Sc from Hemvati Nandan Bahuguna Garhwal University
- Profession: Teacher and politician

Chandra Pant (born, 15 January 1968) is an Indian politician who served as Member of the Uttarakhand Legislative Assembly from Pithoragarh from 2019 till 2022. She was elected in the by-election in 2019 as a Bharatiya Janata Party candidate. By-election was held due to death of her husband, Prakash Pant. She lost in 2022 to Mayukh Mahar.

== Education ==
She is a post graduate and holds a degree of M.A. from Hemvati Nandan Bahuguna Garhwal University and also a degree of B.Sc. Before entering politics, she was a teacher.

== Electoral performance ==
Election	Constituency	Party	Result	Votes %	Opposition Candidate	Opposition Party	Opposition vote %	Ref
2022	Pithoragarh	BJP	Lost	38.84%	Mayukh Mahar	INC	47.48%	
2019 By-election	Pithoragarh	BJP	Won	52.44%	Anju Lunthi	INC	45.88%	0
