= Puran Singh Fartyal =

Indian politician

Member of Uttarakhand Legislative Assembly
- In office 2012–2022
- Preceded by: Mahendra Singh Mahra
- Succeeded by: Khushal Singh Adhikari
- Constituency: Lohaghat

Personal details
- Born: 1 March 1966 (age 60)
- Party: Bharatiya Janata Party

Puran Singh Fartyal is an Indian politician and member of the Bharatiya Janata Party. Fartyal was a two term member of the Uttarakhand Legislative Assembly from the Lohaghat constituency in Champawat district.

== Electoral performance ==
Election	Constituency	Party	Result	Votes %	Opposition Candidate	Opposition Party	Opposition vote %	Ref
2022	Lohaghat	BJP	Lost	42.18%	Khushal Singh Adhikari	INC	51.65%	
2017	Lohaghat	BJP	Won	47.37%	Khushal Singh Adhikari	INC	45.94%	
2012	Lohaghat	BJP	Won	59.02%	Mahendra Singh Mahra	INC	36.65%	
2002	Lohaghat	BSP	Lost	10.03%	Mahendra Singh Mahra	INC	36.20%	
