= Dayakishan Pandey =

Indian politician and lawyer (1911-1976)

Member of the Uttar Pradesh Legislative Assembly
- In office 1974–1976
- Preceded by: Hira Singh Bora
- Succeeded by: Kamal Kishan Pandey
- Constituency: Pithoragarh

Personal details
- Born: 24 March 1911 Pithoragarh, Uttarakhand
- Died: 21 October 1976 (aged 65) Pithoragarh, Uttarakhand
- Party: Indian National Congress (Organisation)
- Other political affiliations: Indian National Congress
- Children: Kamal Kishan Pandey

Dayakishan Pandey (24 March 1911 - 21 October 1976) was an Indian politician and advocate who served as a MLA from Pithoragarh Assembly constituency from 1974 until his death in 1976 as a member of the Indian National Congress (Organisation)

== Political career ==
- 1962- Lost to Krishna Chandra Pant from Nainital Lok Sabha constituency
- 1974- Elected to Pithoragarh on Congress(O) ticket

== Personal life ==
Pande died on 21 October 1976, aged 65. Following his death his son Kamal Kishan Pandey was elected as the M.L.A of Pithoragarh in 1977.
