= Narendra Singh Bisht =

Indian politician, philanthropist and advocate (1915–1984)

Minister of Forest And education, U.P Government
- In office 1970–1971

Member of Parliament, Lok Sabha
- In office 1971–1977
- Preceded by: Jang Bahadur Bisht
- Succeeded by: Murli Manohar Joshi
- Constituency: Almora

Member of Legislative assembly, Uttar Pradesh
- In office 1980–1984
- Preceded by: Kamal Kishan Pandey
- Succeeded by: Kamal Kishan Pandey
- Constituency: Pithoragarh
- In office 1952–1971
- Preceded by: Constituency established
- Succeeded by: Hira Singh Bora
- Constituency: Pithoragarh

Personal details
- Born: 15 March 1915 Pithoragarh, Uttarakhand, India
- Died: 3 September 1984 (aged 69) New Delhi, Delhi, India
- Party: Indian National Congress
- Spouse: Shrimati Kunwarani Ratna Bisht (m.1950)
- Relatives: Dan Singh Bisht (uncle)
- Education: Allahabad University (L.L.B)

Narendra Singh Bisht (15 March 1915 - 3 September 1984) was an Indian politician, philanthropist and advocate who served as a member of parliament from Almora Lok Sabha constituency and a former minister of Uttar Pradesh. He was a six time MLA from Pithoragarh Assembly constituency as a member of the Indian National Congress.

== Education ==
He had a degree of L.L.B from Allahabad University.

== Political career ==
- 1952- Elected to Pithoragarh on Congress ticket (1'st term)
- 1957- Elected to Pithoragarh on Congress ticket (2'nd term)
- 1957- Deputy minister in UP government
- 1962- Elected to Pithoragarh on Congress ticket (3'rd term)
- 1967- Elected to Pithoragarh on Congress ticket (4'th term)
- 1969- Elected to Pithoragarh on Congress ticket (5'th term)
- 1970- State minister for forest and education in UP government
- 1971- Elected to Almora lok sabha on Congress ticket
- 1977- Lost to Murli Manohar Joshi from Almora Lok Sabha
- 1980-Elected to Pithoragarh on Congress ticket (6 'th term)

An able parliamentarian, he took keen interest in the proceedings of the House. He served as the chairman and member of various important Legislative Committees of the State Assembly and also on the Panel of Chairmen. He was deputed to British Parliament by the Uttar Pradesh Legislature to study parliamentary procedure and practice. An agriculturist and Advocate by profession. Shri Bisht took special interest in the economic and educational development of backward hilly areas in Uttar Pradesh and was associated with several District and State level organisations. A widely travelled person, Shri Bisht attended the Peace Conference at Helsinkiin 1967.

== Elections ==
Year	Constituency	Result	Vote percentage	Opposition Candidate	Opposition Party	Opposition vote percentage	Ref
1952	Pithoragarh	Won	53.14%	Hoshiyar Singh	IND	43.72%	
1957	Pithoragarh	Won	48.47%	Jayant Lal	PSP	40.34%	
1962	Pithoragarh	Won	63.97%	Lilaram Sharma	PSP	25.42%	
1967	Pithoragarh	Won	53.24%	B.D. Patni	BJS	25.73%	
1969	Pithoragarh	Won	55.45%	Mohan Singh Chand	BJS	24.22%	
1971	Almora	Won	75.96%	Shobhan Singh Jeena	BJS	35.97%	
1977	Almora	Lost	36.95%	Murli Manohar Joshi	JP	63.05%	
1980	Pithoragarh	Won	55.37%	Kamal Kishan Pandey	JP	38.04%	

== Personal life ==
Narendra Singh was born to Late Chanchal Singh Bisht, a businessman in Pithoragarh on 15 March 2025. He was the nephew of famous local businessman, Dan Singh Bisht. He was from the influential Maldar family. He married Shrimati Kunwarani Ratna Bisht on 14 January 1950. He died on 3 September 1984, aged 69 in New Delhi. After his death, his widow Ratna contested from Pithoragarh Assembly constituency in 1985 election on congress ticket but lost to Kamal Kishan Pandey. His brother Ravindra Singh (Kiran Maldar) contested from Pithoragarh Assembly constituency in 2007 but lost to Prakash Pant.
