= Mayukh Singh Mahar =

Indian politician (born 1956)

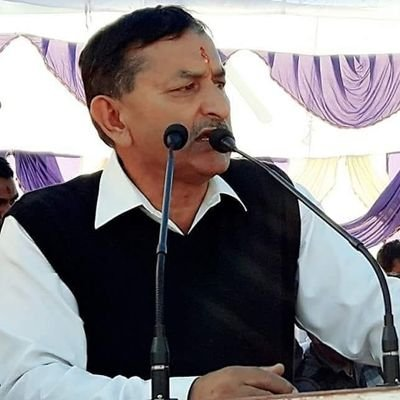

Member of Uttarakhand Legislative Assembly
- Incumbent
- Assumed office 2022
- Preceded by: Chandra Pant
- Constituency: Pithoragarh
- In office 2012–2017
- Preceded by: Prakash Pant
- Succeeded by: Prakash Pant
- Constituency: Pithoragarh
- In office 2007–2012
- Preceded by: Kashi Singh Airy
- Succeeded by: Constituency Abolished
- Constituency: Kanalichhina

Personal details
- Born: 1 January 1956 (age 70)
- Party: Indian National Congress
- Education: M.A. and B.S. from Kumaon University

Mayukh Singh Mahar (born, 1 January 1956) is an Indian politician from Uttarakhand who is the current member of Uttarakhand Legislative Assembly from Pithoragarh. He is a three term member of the Uttarakhand Legislative Assembly and is a member of Indian National Congress.

Ethnically, he is a Kumaoni and a Kshatriya Rajput. He was elected as MLA from Pithoragarh constituency for the first time in 2012, defeating Prakash Pant by a significant margin of 13,197 votes and polling 59.46% of the votes cast and winning by over 23.10%. This was the highest victory margin in terms of number of votes and percentage in the history of Pithoragarh Assembly constituency. Then, in 2017 assembly elections, he got defeated by Prakash Pant by a margin of 2,684 votes, securing 45.15% of the votes cast. Afterwards, in 2022 Uttarakhand Legislative Assembly Elections, he again came to power, defeating Chandra Pant from Bharatiya Janata Party by a margin of 6,054 votes and securing 47.48% of the votes cast. He was also elected in 2007 Uttarakhand Legislative Assembly election from the now defunct Kanalichhina Assembly constituency in Pithoragarh district, defeating UKD chief Kashi Singh Airy by a margin of 4,473 votes by securing 42.21% of the votes cast.

== Electoral performance ==
Election	Constituency	Party	Result	Votes %	Opposition Candidate	Opposition Party	Opposition vote %	Ref
2022	Pithoragarh	INC	Won	47.48%	Chandra Pant	BJP	38.84%	
2017	Pithoragarh	INC	Lost	45.15%	Prakash Pant	BJP	49.16%	
2012	Pithoragarh	INC	Won	59.46%	Prakash Pant	BJP	36.37%	
2007	Kanalichhina	INC	Won	42.21%	Kashi Singh Airy	UKD	27.59%	
2002	Pithoragarh	INC	Lost	24.18%	Prakash Pant	BJP	39.15%	
