= 1969 Uttar Pradesh Legislative Assembly election =

- 5 February 1969

All 425 seats of Uttar Pradesh Legislative Assembly 213 seats needed for a majority
- Registered: 44,812,431
- Turnout: 54.06%
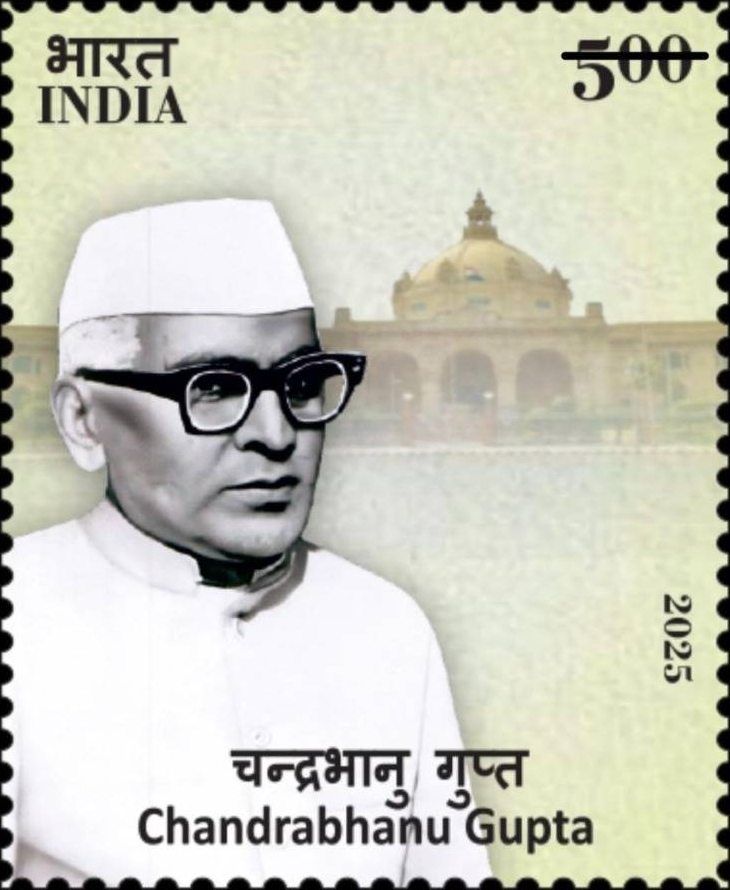

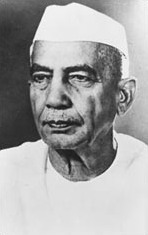

| | Majority party | Minority party | Third party |
|---|---|---|---|
| Leader | Chandra Bhanu Gupta | Charan Singh |
| Party | INC(R) | BKD | ABJS |
| Leader's seat | Ranikhet | Chhaprauli |
| Last election | 199 | New | 98 |
| Seats won | 211 | 98 | 49 |
| Seat change | ▲12 | New | ▼49 |
| Popular vote | 6,912,104 | 4,989,116 | 4,200,175 |
| Percentage | 33.69% | 21.29 | 17.93% |
| Swing | ▲1.49% | New | ▼3.74% |
Chief Minister before election
President's Rule
Elected Chief Minister
Chandra Bhanu Gupta
INC

Elections to the Uttar Pradesh Legislative Assembly were held in February 1969, to elect members of the 425 constituencies in Uttar Pradesh, India. The Indian National Congress won the most seats as well as the popular vote, and Chandra Bhanu Gupta was appointed the Chief Minister of Uttar Pradesh.

The state had been under President's Rule since February 1968. After the passing of The Delimitation of Parliamentary and Assembly Constituencies Order, 1961, the constituencies were set to the ones used in this election. In this election Bharatiya Kranti Dal led by Charan Singh contested for the first time and won 98 Seats.

== Result ==
| Party | Votes | % | Seats | +/– |
|---|---|---|---|---|
| Indian National Congress | 7,893,152 | 33.69 | 211 | +12 |
| Bharatiya Kranti Dal | 4,989,116 | 21.29 | 98 | New |
| Bharatiya Jana Sangh | 4,200,175 | 17.93 | 49 | –49 |
| Samyukta Socialist Party | 1,831,345 | 7.82 | 33 | –11 |
| Republican Party of India | 815,964 | 3.48 | 1 | –9 |
| Communist Party of India | 715,092 | 3.05 | 4 | –9 |
| Praja Socialist Party | 401,999 | 1.72 | 3 | –8 |
| Swatantra Party | 293,781 | 1.25 | 5 | –7 |
| Communist Party of India (Marxist) | 114,616 | 0.49 | 1 | 0 |
| Uttar Pradesh Kisan Mazdoor Party | 112,552 | 0.48 | 1 | New |
| Hindu Mahasabha | 67,807 | 0.29 | 1 | New |
| Others | 333,068 | 1.42 | 0 | – |
| Independents | 1,661,887 | 7.09 | 18 | –19 |
| Total | 23,430,554 | 100.00 | 425 | 0 |
| Valid votes | 23,430,554 | 96.72 | | |
| Invalid/blank votes | 794,232 | 3.28 | | |
| Total votes | 24,224,786 | 100.00 | | |
| Registered voters/turnout | 44,812,431 | 54.06 | | |
Source: ECI

== Elected members ==
| Constituency | Reserved for (SC/ST/None) | Member | Party |
|---|---|---|---|
| Uttar Kashi | None | Krishan Singh | Indian National Congress |
| Tehri | None | Govind Singh | Communist Party of India |
| Deoprayag | None | Indra Mani | Indian National Congress |
| Lansdowne | None | Chandra Mohan | Indian National Congress |
| Ekeshwar | None | Meharban Singh | Independent |
| Pauri | None | Shiva Nand Nautiyal | Independent |
| Karanprayag | None | Sher Singh Danu | Bharatiya Jana Sangh |
| Badri Kedar | None | Narendra Singh | Independent |
| Didihat | None | Gopal Dutt Ojha | Indian National Congress |
| Pithoragarh | None | Narendra Singh Bisht | Indian National Congress |
| Almora | None | Hari Singh | Indian National Congress |
| Bageshwar | SC | Saraswati Devi | Indian National Congress |
| Dwarahat | None | Hari Datt | Indian National Congress |
| Ranikhet | None | Chandra Bhanu Gupta | Indian National Congress |
| Nainital | None | Doongar Singh | Indian National Congress |
| Haldwani | SC | Indra Lal | Indian National Congress |
| Kashipur | None | Naraian Datt | Indian National Congress |
| Noorpur | None | Sheo Nath Singh | Bharatiya Kranti Dal |
| Dhampur | None | Sattar Ahmad | Bharatiya Kranti Dal |
| Afzalgarh | SC | Girdhari Lal | Indian National Congress |
| Nagina | None | Atiqur Rehman | Indian National Congress |
| Najibabad | None | Devender Singh | Bharatiya Kranti Dal |
| Bijnor | None | Ram Pal Singh | Bharatiya Kranti Dal |
| Chandpur | None | Shiv Mahendar Singh | Bharatiya Kranti Dal |
| Kanth | None | Nau Nihal Singh | Bharatiya Kranti Dal |
| Amroha | None | Saubhagyawati | Bharatiya Kranti Dal |
| Hasanpur | None | Mahendra Singh | Bharatiya Kranti Dal |
| Ganeshwari | SC | Jitendra Pal Singh | Bharatiya Kranti Dal |
| Sambhal | None | Mahmood Hasan Khan | Bharatiya Kranti Dal |
| Bahjoi | None | Bishan Lal | Bharatiya Kranti Dal |
| Chandausi | None | Indra Mohini | Indian National Congress |
| Kundarki | SC | Mahi Lal | Bharatiya Kranti Dal |
| Moradabad City | None | Halimuddin Rahat Maulaey | Independent |
| Moradabad Rural | None | Riasat Husain | Praja Socialist Party |
| Thakurdwara | None | Ahmad Ullam Khan | Swatantra Party |
| Suar Tanda | None | Rajendra Kumar Sharma | Bharatiya Jana Sangh |
| Rampur | None | Syed Murtaza Ali Khan | Indian National Congress |
| Bilaspur | None | Chanchal Singh | Indian National Congress |
| Shahabad | SC | Banshi Dhar | Bharatiya Kranti Dal |
| Bisauli | None | Shiv Raj Singh | Bharatiya Kranti Dal |
| Gunnaur | None | Rishi Pal Singh | Bharatiya Jana Sangh |
| Sahaswan | None | Shanti Devi | Bharatiya Kranti Dal |
| Ambiapur | SC | Kesho Ram | Indian National Congress |
| Budaun | None | Krishan Swaroop | Bharatiya Jana Sangh |
| Usehat | None | Narottam Singh | Indian National Congress |
| Dataganj | None | Tribeni Sahai | Indian National Congress |
| Binawar | None | Mohd. Asrar Ahmad | Independent |
| Aonla | SC | Kesho Ram | Indian National Congress |
| Alampur | None | Om Prakash Singh | Bharatiya Kranti Dal |
| Faridpur | None | Rajeshwar Singh | Bharatiya Kranti Dal |
| Nawabganj | None | Chetram Gangwar | Bharatiya Jana Sangh |
| Bareilly City | None | Ram Singh Khanna | Bharatiya Kranti Dal |
| Bareilly Cantonment | None | Ashfaq Ahmad | Indian National Congress |
| Bhojipura | None | Bhanu Pratap Singh | Indian National Congress |
| Shergarh | None | Dharam Datt | Indian National Congress |
| Baheri | None | Shafiq Ahmad Khan | Bharatiya Kranti Dal |
| Pilibhit | None | Ali Zaheer | Indian National Congress |
| Barkhera | SC | Kishan Lal | Bharatiya Jana Sangh |
| Bisalpur | None | Tej Bahadur | Bharatiya Kranti Dal |
| Puranpur | None | Har Narain | Bharatiya Kranti Dal |
| Powayan | SC | Kandhai | Indian National Congress |
| Nigohi | None | Sheo Kumar | Indian National Congress |
| Tilhar | None | Surendra Vikram | Indian National Congress |
| Jalalabad | None | Keshav Chandra Singh | Indian National Congress |
| Dadraul | None | Ram Murti Anchal | Indian National Congress |
| Shahjahanpur | None | Uma Shankar Shukla | Bharatiya Jana Sangh |
| Mohamdi | SC | Sewa Ram | Indian National Congress |
| Haiderabad | None | Makhan Lal | Indian National Congress |
| Lakhimpur | None | Tej Narain | Indian National Congress |
| Bankeyganj | SC | Chheda Lal Chaughry | Indian National Congress |
| Phool Behar | None | Banshi Dhar Misra | Indian National Congress |
| Nighasan | None | Karan Singh | Indian National Congress |
| Dhaurehra | None | Jagannath Prasad | Indian National Congress |
| Behta | None | Krishna Kant | Indian National Congress |
| Biswan | None | Kripal Dayal | Indian National Congress |
| Mahmudabad | None | Shayam Sundar Lal Gupta | Indian National Congress |
| Sidhauli | SC | Shyam Lal Rawat | Indian National Congress |
| Sitapur | None | Shyam Kishore | Indian National Congress |
| Laharpur | None | Abid Ali | Indian National Congress |
| Hargaon | SC | Ram Lal Rahi | Indian National Congress |
| Misrikh | None | Avadhesh Kumar | Samyukta Socialist Party |
| Machhretha | SC | Chaudhary Virendra Kumar | Indian National Congress |
| Beniganj | SC | Shukru | Bharatiya Kranti Dal |
| Sandila | None | Kudsia Begam | Indian National Congress |
| Ahirori | SC | Parmai Lal | Independent |
| Hardoi | None | Smt. Asha Singh | Indian National Congress |
| Bawan | None | Shrish Chand | Indian National Congress |
| Pihani | SC | Kanhaiya Lal Balmiki | Indian National Congress |
| Shahabad | None | Harihar Bux Singh | Indian National Congress |
| Bilgram | None | Kala Rani | Indian National Congress |
| Mallawan | None | Lalan Sharma | Indian National Congress |
| Bangarmau | None | Gopi Nath Dixit | Indian National Congress |
| Unnao | None | Anwar Ahmad | Bharatiya Kranti Dal |
| Bichhia | None | Shiva Pal Singh | Bharatiya Kranti Dal |
| Bhagwantnagar | None | Bhagwati Singh Visharad | Indian National Congress |
| Purwa | SC | Dularey Lal | Indian National Congress |
| Hasanganj | None | Sajiwan Lal | Communist Party of India |
| Miyanganj | SC | Badri Prasad | Indian National Congress |
| Malihabad | SC | Basant Lal | Indian National Congress |
| Mahona | None | Ram Pal Trivedi | Indian National Congress |
| Lucknow East | None | Bans Gopal Shukal | Bharatiya Kranti Dal |
| Lucknow Central | None | Imtiaz Husain | Bharatiya Kranti Dal |
| Lucknow West | None | D . P . Bora | Bharatiya Kranti Dal |
| Lucknow Cantonment | None | Sachchida Nand | Bharatiya Kranti Dal |
| Sarojininagar | None | Chandra Bhanu Gupta | Indian National Congress |
| Mohanlalganj | SC | Narain Dass | Indian National Congress |
| Bachhrawan | SC | Ram Dularey | Indian National Congress |
| Tiloi | None | Mohan Singh | Bharatiya Jana Sangh |
| Rae Bareli | None | Madan Mohan Misra | Indian National Congress |
| Sataon | None | Rajendra Pratap Singh | Indian National Congress |
| Sareni | None | Guptar Singh | Indian National Congress |
| Dalmau | None | Shiva Shanker Singh | Indian National Congress |
| Salon | None | Sheo Prasad Pandia | Samyukta Socialist Party |
| Rokha | SC | Ram Prasad | Indian National Congress |
| Kunda | None | Jai Ram | Samyukta Socialist Party |
| Bihar | SC | Gaya Prasad | Samyukta Socialist Party |
| Rampur Khas | None | Kunwar Tej Bhan Singh | Samyukta Socialist Party |
| Lachmanpur | None | Vasdeo | Samyukta Socialist Party |
| Pratapgarh | None | Ajit Pratap Singh | Indian National Congress |
| Birapur | None | Ram Deo | Samyukta Socialist Party |
| Patti | SC | Ram Kinkar | Bharatiya Kranti Dal |
| Amethi | None | Raja Rananjaya Singh | Bharatiya Jana Sangh |
| Gauriganj | None | Raj Pati Devi | Indian National Congress |
| Jagdishpur | SC | Ram Sewak | Bharatiya Jana Sangh |
| Issauli | None | Ram Jiawan | Bharatiya Kranti Dal |
| Jaisinghpur | None | Sheo Kumar | Indian National Congress |
| Sultanpur | None | Ram Piare Shukla | Bharatiya Jana Sangh |
| Lambhua | None | Udai Pratap Singh | Bharatiya Jana Sangh |
| Kadipur | SC | Jagdish Prasad | Indian National Congress |
| Katehri | None | Bhagwati Prasad Shukla | Indian National Congress |
| Akbarpur | None | Priya Darshi Jetly | Indian National Congress |
| Jalalpur | None | Jagdamba Prasad | Indian National Congress |
| Jahangirganj | SC | Ram Awadh | Bharatiya Kranti Dal |
| Tanda | None | Ram Chandra Azad | Bharatiya Kranti Dal |
| Maya | None | Shambhoo Narain Singh | Communist Party of India |
| Ayodhya | None | Vishwanath Kapoor | Indian National Congress |
| Bikapur | None | Manwati Devi | Indian National Congress |
| Milkipur | None | Hari Nath Tewari | Bharatiya Jana Sangh |
| Sohawal | SC | Dhoom Prasad | Bharatiya Jana Sangh |
| Rudauli | None | Krishna Magan Singh | Indian National Congress |
| Daryabad | None | Girja Shankar | Indian National Congress |
| Siddhaur | SC | Sheo Kailash | Samyukta Socialist Party |
| Haidergarh | None | Hamida Habiullah | Indian National Congress |
| Masauli | None | Mustafa Kamil Kidwai | Independent |
| Nawabganj | None | Anant Ram Jaiswal | Samyukta Socialist Party |
| Fatehpur | SC | Nattha Ram | Indian National Congress |
| Ramnagar | None | Shesh Narain Shukla | Indian National Congress |
| Kaisarganj | None | Bhagwati Singh | Indian National Congress |
| Fakharpur | None | Basudeo Singh | Bharatiya Jana Sangh |
| Mahsi | None | Ram Harakh | Indian National Congress |
| Sheopur | None | Basant Lal | Indian National Congress |
| Nanpara | None | Paras Nath Singh | Bharatiya Jana Sangh |
| Charda | SC | Mahadeo Prasad | Indian National Congress |
| Bhinga | None | Chandra Mani Kant Singh | Indian National Congress |
| Bahraich | None | Kedar Nath | Indian National Congress |
| Ikauna | SC | Bhagwati | Bharatiya Jana Sangh |
| Tulsipur | SC | Sant Ram | Indian National Congress |
| Gainsapi | None | Vijai Pal Singh | Bharatiya Jana Sangh |
| Balrampur | None | Maheshwar Dutt Singh | Indian National Congress |
| Utraula | None | Suraj Lal | Bharatiya Jana Sangh |
| Sadullanagar | None | Abdul Ghaffar Hashmi | Swatantra Party |
| Mankapur | None | Anand Singh | Indian National Congress |
| Mujehna | None | Deep Narain Ban | Indian National Congress |
| Gonda | None | Triveni Sahai | Bharatiya Jana Sangh |
| Katrabazar | None | Ram Singh | Bharatiya Jana Sangh |
| Coloneganj | None | Bhagelu Singh | Samyukta Socialist Party |
| Tarabganj | None | Shiutla Prasad Singh | Indian National Congress |
| Mahadeva | SC | Ganga Prasad | Indian National Congress |
| Bikramjot | None | Sukhpal Pandey | Praja Socialist Party |
| Harraiya | SC | Lalu | Indian National Congress |
| Bahadurpur | None | Ram Lakhan Singh | Indian National Congress |
| Basti | None | Rajendra Kishori | Indian National Congress |
| Saonghat | SC | Sohan Lal Dhusiya | Indian National Congress |
| Domariaganj | None | Jalil Abbasi | Indian National Congress |
| Bhanwapur | None | Bhanu Pratap Singh | Swatantra Party |
| Banganga | None | Ram Kumar Shastri | Indian National Congress |
| Naugarh | None | Abimanyu | Indian National Congress |
| Bansi | None | Madhava Prasad Tripathi | Bharatiya Jana Sangh |
| Khesraha | None | Raj Bahadur Chand | Indian National Congress |
| Rudhauli | None | Mahammad Nabi | Bharatiya Kranti Dal |
| Menhdawal | None | Lalsa Prasad | Indian National Congress |
| Khalilabad | None | Dhanush Dhari Pandey | Indian National Congress |
| Hainsarbazar | SC | Santu | Bharatiya Jana Sangh |
| Bansgaon | None | Masali Devi | Samyukta Socialist Party |
| Dhuriapur | SC | Ram Pati | Samyukta Socialist Party |
| Chillupar | None | Kalp Nath Singh | Indian National Congress |
| Kauriram | None | Ram Lakhan Shukla | Indian National Congress |
| Jhangaha | SC | Phirangi | Bharatiya Kranti Dal |
| Pipraich | None | Hari Prasad Shahi | Indian National Congress |
| Gorakhpur | None | Ram Lal Bhai | Indian National Congress |
| Maniram | None | Avidya Nath | Hindu Mahasabha |
| Sahjanwan | None | Ram Karan | Praja Socialist Party |
| Paniara | None | Bir Bahadur Singh | Indian National Congress |
| Pharenda | None | Pyari | Indian National Congress |
| Lakshmipur | None | Ram Lagan Dubey | Indian National Congress |
| Siswa | None | Yadvendra Singh | Indian National Congress |
| Maharajganj | SC | Hansa | Bharatiya Kranti Dal |
| Shyam Deurwa | None | Mahatam | Bharatiya Kranti Dal |
| Naurangia | SC | Baij Nath | Bharatiya Kranti Dal |
| Ramkola | None | Mangal Upadhya | Bharatiya Kranti Dal |
| Hata | None | Bankey Lal | Samyukta Socialist Party |
| Padrauna | None | Chandra Pratap N. Singh | Bharatiya Kranti Dal |
| Seorahi | None | Genda Singh | Indian National Congress |
| Fazilnagar | None | Ram Dhari | Samyukta Socialist Party |
| Kushinagar | None | Raj Mangal Pandey | Indian National Congress |
| Gauri Bazar | None | Ram Lal | Indian National Congress |
| Rudrapur | SC | Sita Ram | Indian National Congress |
| Deoria | None | Deep Narain | Bharatiya Kranti Dal |
| Bhatpar Rani | None | Haribansh | Samyukta Socialist Party |
| Salempur | None | Sheo Bachan | Indian National Congress |
| Barhaj | None | Awadhesh Pratap Mall | Indian National Congress |
| Nathpur | SC | Lalsa | Indian National Congress |
| Ghosi | None | Ram Vilas Pandey | Indian National Congress |
| Sagri | None | Ram Kunwar | Indian National Congress |
| Gopalpur | None | Dal Singar | Samyukta Socialist Party |
| Azamgarh | None | Bhima Prasad | Samyukta Socialist Party |
| Rani Ki Sarai | None | Ram Bachan | Bharatiya Jana Sangh |
| Atraulia | None | Jang Bahadur Singh | Indian National Congress |
| Phulpur | None | Ram Vachan | Bharatiya Kranti Dal |
| Martinganj | SC | Banarsi | Bharatiya Kranti Dal |
| Mehnagar | SC | Chhangur | Communist Party of India |
| Lalganj | None | Triveni | Indian National Congress |
| Mubarakpur | None | Bhabhi | Samyukta Socialist Party |
| Mohammadabad Gohna | SC | Shyam Lal | Samyukta Socialist Party |
| Mau | None | Habibur Rahman | Bharatiya Kranti Dal |
| Rasra | SC | Ram Ratan | Indian National Congress |
| Siar | None | Babban | Independent |
| Chilkahar | None | Jagar Nath | Indian National Congress |
| Sikandarpur | None | Norbhai Narain Singh | Independent |
| Bansdih | None | Bachcha Pathak | Indian National Congress |
| Duaba | None | Manager Singh | Independent |
| Ballia | None | Shambhoo Nath Chaudhari | Samyukta Socialist Party |
| Kopachit | None | Nagina Singh | Samyukta Socialist Party |
| Qasimabad | None | Sheo Shanker | Indian National Congress |
| Mohammadabad | None | Vijai Shanker Singh | Indian National Congress |
| Dildarnagar | None | Krishnanand Rai | Indian National Congress |
| Zamania | None | Bashishth Narain Sharma | Indian National Congress |
| Ghazipur | None | Ram Surat Singh | Indian National Congress |
| Jakhania | SC | Deo Ram | Indian National Congress |
| Sadat | None | Raj Nath | Indian National Congress |
| Saidpur | None | Ramkaran | Bharatiya Kranti Dal |
| Dhanapur | None | Baij Nath | Bharatiya Kranti Dal |
| Chandauli | None | Kamlapati | Indian National Congress |
| Chakia | SC | Ramlakhan | Indian National Congress |
| Mughalsarai | None | Uma Shanker | Indian National Congress |
| Varanasi Cantonment | None | Lal Bahadur | Indian National Congress |
| Varanasi North | None | Sankar Prasad Jaiswal | Bharatiya Jana Sangh |
| Varanasi South | None | Sachindra Nath Bakshi | Bharatiya Jana Sangh |
| Araziline | None | Raj Behari | Indian National Congress |
| Chiraigaon | None | Udai Nath | Bharatiya Kranti Dal |
| Kolaslah | None | Amar Nath | Indian National Congress |
| Aurai | None | Nihala Singh | Indian National Congress |
| Gyanpur | None | Banshidhar Pandey | Indian National Congress |
| Bhadohi | SC | Ram Nihor | Bharatiya Kranti Dal |
| Barsathi | None | Yadvendra Dutt Dubey | Bharatiya Jana Sangh |
| Mariahu | None | Jagannath Rao | Bharatiya Jana Sangh |
| Kerakat | SC | Ram Sagar | Bharatiya Jana Sangh |
| Beyalsi | None | Uma Nath | Bharatiya Jana Sangh |
| Jaunpur | None | Jang Bahadur | Bharatiya Jana Sangh |
| Rari | None | Surya Nath | Indian National Congress |
| Shahganj | SC | Mata Prasad | Indian National Congress |
| Khutahan | None | Laxshmi Shankar Yadava | Indian National Congress |
| Garwara | None | Ram Shiromani | Indian National Congress |
| Machhlishahr | None | Moti Lal | Bharatiya Kranti Dal |
| Dudhi | SC | Ram Pyare | Indian National Congress |
| Robertsganj | SC | Subedar | Bharatiya Jana Sangh |
| Rajgarh | None | Raja Anand | Bharatiya Kranti Dal |
| Chunar | None | Shiva Das | Samyukta Socialist Party |
| Majhwa | SC | Ram Nihore Ram | Bharatiya Jana Sangh |
| Mirzapur | None | Vijai Bahadur Singh | Bharatiya Jana Sangh |
| Chhanvey | None | Raja Sriniwas Prasad Singh | Indian National Congress |
| Meja | SC | Vishram Das | Indian National Congress |
| Karchana | None | Ram Kishore Shukla | Indian National Congress |
| Bara | None | Sarva Sukh Singh | Bharatiya Kranti Dal |
| Bahadurpur | None | Rup Nath Singh Yadava | Samyukta Socialist Party |
| Handia | None | Rajit Ram | Samyukta Socialist Party |
| Pratappur | None | Shyam Surat | Samyukta Socialist Party |
| Soraon | None | Vishwa Nath Pratap Singh | Indian National Congress |
| Kaurihar | None | Ram Pujan Patel | Samyukta Socialist Party |
| Allahabad North | None | Rajendra Kumari Bajpai | Indian National Congress |
| Allahabad South | None | Ram Gopal Sand | Bharatiya Jana Sangh |
| Allahabad West | None | Habib Ahmed | Independent |
| Chail | SC | Kanhaiya Lal Sonker | Bharatiya Jana Sangh |
| Manjhanpur | SC | Dharam Vir | Indian National Congress |
| Sirathu | None | Ram Charan | Samyukta Socialist Party |
| Khaga | None | Krishna Datta Alias Balraj | Indian National Congress |
| Kishunpur | SC | Indrajit | Indian National Congress |
| Haswa | None | Jai Narain Singh | Indian National Congress |
| Fatehpur | None | Uma Kant Bajpai | Bharatiya Jana Sangh |
| Khajuha | None | Udit Narain | Bharatiya Kranti Dal |
| Bindki | None | Panna Lal | Bharatiya Kranti Dal |
| Aryanagar | SC | Shiv Lal | Indian National Congress |
| Chamanganj | None | Naseemuddin | Independent |
| Generalganj | None | Ganesh Dutt Bajpayi | Indian National Congress |
| Kanpur Cantonment | None | Manohar Lal | Bharatiya Kranti Dal |
| Govindnagar | None | Prabhakar Tripathi | Indian National Congress |
| Kalyanpur | None | Krishna Bajpai | Bharatiya Kranti Dal |
| Sarsaul | None | Upendra Nath | Bharatiya Kranti Dal |
| Ghatampur | None | Beni Singh | Indian National Congress |
| Bhoganipur | None | Jwala Prasad Kureel | Indian National Congress |
| Rajpur | None | Ram Swarup Verma | Independent |
| Sarvankhera | None | Raghu Nath Singh | Indian National Congress |
| Chaubepur | None | Ram Kumar | Indian National Congress |
| Bilhaur | SC | Moti Lal Dehalvi | Samyukta Socialist Party |
| Derapur | None | Ram Pal Singh Yada | Samyukta Socialist Party |
| Auraiya | None | Chauhan Bharat Singh | Bharatiya Kranti Dal |
| Ajitmal | SC | Kori Sukh Lal | Indian National Congress |
| Lakhana | SC | Ghasi Ram | Indian National Congress |
| Etawah | None | Agarwal Hoti Lal | Indian National Congress |
| Jaswantnagar | None | Bishambhar Singh Yadav | Indian National Congress |
| Bindhuna | None | Gajendra Singh | Bharatiya Kranti Dal |
| Bharthana | None | Balram Singh Yadav | Indian National Congress |
| Kannauj | SC | Behari Lal | Bharatiya Kranti Dal |
| Umardha | None | Ram Ratan Pandey | Indian National Congress |
| Chhibramau | None | Jagdishwar Dayal | Indian National Congress |
| Kamalganj | None | Abdul Salam Shah | Indian National Congress |
| Farrukhabad | None | Maharam Singh | Indian National Congress |
| Kaimganj | None | Siya Ram Gangwar | Indian National Congress |
| Mohammadabad | None | Vidyawati | Indian National Congress |
| Manikpur | SC | Siya Dulari | Indian National Congress |
| Karwi | None | Radha Krishna Goswami | Indian National Congress |
| Baberu | None | Durjan | Communist Party of India |
| Naraini | None | Harbansh Prasad | Indian National Congress |
| Banda | None | Mahiraj Dhwaj Singh | Indian National Congress |
| Hamirpur | None | Pratap Narain | Indian National Congress |
| Maudaha | None | Braj Raj Singh | Indian National Congress |
| Rath | None | Swami Prasad Singh | Indian National Congress |
| Charkhari | None | Chandra Narain Singh | Bharatiya Jana Sangh |
| Mahoba | SC | Mohan Lal | Indian National Congress |
| Mehroni | None | Krishna Chandra | Indian National Congress |
| Lalitpur | SC | Bhagwat Dayal | Bharatiya Jana Sangh |
| Jhansi | None | Jagmohan Verma | Bharatiya Kranti Dal |
| Babina | None | Sudama Prasad | Indian National Congress |
| Mauranipur | SC | Prem Narain | Bharatiya Jana Sangh |
| Garoutha | None | Atma Ram Govind Kher | Indian National Congress |
| Konch | SC | Basant Lal | Indian National Congress |
| Orai | None | Chaturbhuj Sharma | Indian National Congress |
| Kalpi | None | Sheo Sampatti | Indian National Congress |
| Madhogarh | None | Chittar Singh | Independent |
| Bhongaon | None | Subedar Singh | Bharatiya Kranti Dal |
| Kishni | None | Sheo Bux Singh | Indian National Congress |
| Karhal | SC | Munshilal Chamar | Swatantra Party |
| Shikohabad | None | Mansa Ram | Bharatiya Kranti Dal |
| Jasrana | None | Raghu Nath Singh Verma | Indian National Congress |
| Ghiror | None | Raghu Vir Singh Yadav | Bharatiya Kranti Dal |
| Mainpuri | None | Malikhan Singh | Bharatiya Jana Sangh |
| Aliganj | None | Satish Chandra | Bharatiya Jana Sangh |
| Patiali | None | Tirmal Singh | Bharatiya Kranti Dal |
| Sakit | None | Badan Singh | Bharatiya Kranti Dal |
| Soron | SC | Siya Ram | Bharatiya Jana Sangh |
| Kasganj | None | Netram Singh | Bharatiya Jana Sangh |
| Etah | None | Ganga Prasad | Indian National Congress |
| Nidhauli Kalan | None | Ganga Singh | Bharatiya Kranti Dal |
| Jalesar | SC | Chiranji Lal | Bharatiya Kranti Dal |
| Firozabad | None | Raja Ram | Independent |
| Bah | SC | Ram Charan | Swatantra Party |
| Fatehabad | None | Hukam Singh | Samyukta Socialist Party |
| Tundla | None | Multan Singh | Bharatiya Kranti Dal |
| Dayalbagh | SC | Liladhar | Bharatiya Kranti Dal |
| Agra Cantonment | None | Deoki Nandan Bibav | Indian National Congress |
| Agra East | None | Prakash Narain Gupta | Indian National Congress |
| Agra West | None | Hukam Singh | Bharatiya Kranti Dal |
| Kheragarh | None | Jagan Prasad Rawat | Indian National Congress |
| Fatehpur Sikri | None | Raghunath Singh S/o R . Lal | Bharatiya Kranti Dal |
| Goverdhan | SC | Kanhaiya Lal | Indian National Congress |
| Mathura | None | Shanti Charan Pidara | Indian National Congress |
| Chhata | None | Tej Pal | Indian National Congress |
| Mat | None | Laxmi Raman Acharya | Indian National Congress |
| Gokul | None | Chandra Pal Azad | Bharatiya Kranti Dal |
| Sadabad | None | Ashraf Ali Khan | Indian National Congress |
| Hathras | None | Prem Chandra Sharma | Indian National Congress |
| Sasni | SC | Ram Prasad Deshmukh | Bharatiya Kranti Dal |
| Sikandra Rao | None | Jagdish Gandhi | Independent |
| Gangiri | None | Anisur Rehman | Samyukta Socialist Party |
| Atrauli | None | Kalyan Singh | Bharatiya Jana Sangh |
| Aligarh | None | Ahmad Loot Khan | Indian National Congress |
| Koil | SC | Pooran Chand | Bharatiya Kranti Dal |
| Iglas | None | Gayatri Devi | Bharatiya Kranti Dal |
| Khair | None | Mahendra Singh | Bharatiya Kranti Dal |
| Chandaus | None | Mahavir Singh | Bharatiya Kranti Dal |
| Jewar | SC | Dharam Singh | Bharatiya Kranti Dal |
| Khurja | None | Raghuraj Singh | Bharatiya Kranti Dal |
| Chhatari | SC | Trilok Chand | Bharatiya Kranti Dal |
| Debai | None | Himmat Singh | Bharatiya Jana Sangh |
| Anupshahr | None | Khacheru Singh Moharia | Indian National Congress |
| Siana | None | Mumtaz Mohammad Khan | Indian National Congress |
| Agota | None | Jagbir Singh | Bharatiya Kranti Dal |
| Bulandshahr | None | Shamim Alam | Republican Party of India |
| Sikandrabad | None | Virendra Swarup | Independent |
| Dadri | None | Ram Chandra Vikal | Uttar Pradesh Kisan Mazdoor Party |
| Ghaziabad | None | Pearey Lal | Samyukta Socialist Party |
| Muradnagar | None | Ishwar Dayal | Bharatiya Kranti Dal |
| Modinagar | None | Sher Ali Khan | Bharatiya Kranti Dal |
| Hapur | SC | Lakshman Swaroop | Bharatiya Kranti Dal |
| Garhmukteshwar | None | Balbir Singh | Bharatiya Kranti Dal |
| Kithore | None | Manzoor Ahmad | Samyukta Socialist Party |
| Hastinapur | SC | Asha Ram Indu | Bharatiya Kranti Dal |
| Sardhana | None | Jamadar | Indian National Congress |
| Barnawa | None | Dharam Vir Singh | Bharatiya Kranti Dal |
| Meerut | None | Mohan Lal Kapoor | Bharatiya Jana Sangh |
| Meerut Cantonment | None | Uma Datt Sharma | Indian National Congress |
| Rohta | SC | Ramji Lal Sahayek | Indian National Congress |
| Khekhra | None | Naipal | Bharatiya Kranti Dal |
| Baraut | None | Vikram Singh | Indian National Congress |
| Chaprauli | None | Charan Singh | Bharatiya Kranti Dal |
| Kandhla | None | Ajab Singh | Bharatiya Kranti Dal |
| Khatauli | None | Virendra Verma | Bharatiya Kranti Dal |
| Jansath | SC | Manphool Singh | Bharatiya Kranti Dal |
| Morna | None | Dharamvir Singh | Bharatiya Kranti Dal |
| Muzaffarnagar | None | Saeed Murtaza | Bharatiya Kranti Dal |
| Charthawal | SC | Nain Singh | Bharatiya Kranti Dal |
| Kairana | None | Chandra Bhan | Bharatiya Kranti Dal |
| Bhawan | None | Rao Abdur Rafey Khan | Bharatiya Kranti Dal |
| Nakur | None | Qazi Masood | Independent |
| Sarsawa | None | Mohd. Mahmood Ali Khan | Indian National Congress |
| Nagal | SC | Ram Singh | Indian National Congress |
| Deoband | None | Mahabir Singh | Indian National Congress |
| Harora | SC | Shakuntla Devi | Indian National Congress |
| Saharanpur | None | Jaggan Nath Khanna | Bharatiya Jana Sangh |
| Muzaffarabad | None | Sardar Singh | Bharatiya Kranti Dal |
| Roorkee | None | J . N . Sinha | Indian National Congress |
| Lhaksar | None | Sukhbir | Bharatiya Kranti Dal |
| Hardwar | None | Shanti Prapan Sharma | Indian National Congress |
| Dehra Dun | None | Nitya Nand Swami | Bharatiya Jana Sangh |
| Mussoorie | None | Gulab Singh | Indian National Congress |

== Bypolls ==
| Date | Constituency | Reason for by-poll | Winning candidate | Party |
|---|---|---|---|---|
| 1970 | Tanda | Resignation of R.C. Azad | J.R. Verma | Bharatiya Kranti Dal |
| 1971 | Seorahi | Resignation of G. Singh | R.N. Mishra | Indian National Congress |
| 1972 | Pithoragarh | Resignation of N.S. Bhist | H. Singh | Indian National Congress |
| 1972 | Nagina | Death of A. Rehman | A. Rehman | Indian National Congress |
| 1972 | Sarent | Death of G. Singh | R. Singh | Indian National Congress |
| 1972 | Manjapur | Resignation of G. Singh | D.N. Mishra | Indian National Congress |
| 1972 | Maniram | Resignation of A. Singh | R.K. Dwivedi | Indian National Congress |
| 1972 | Rajgarh | Death of R. Anand | Lokpati | Indian National Congress |
| 1972 | Soraon | Resignation of V.P. Singh | R. Tripathi | Indian National Congress |
| 1972 | Rajpur | Void of R.S. Verma's election | R.D. Mishra | Indian National Congress |
| 1972 | Dadri | Resignation of R.C. Vikal | V. Singh | Indian National Congress |
| 1972 | Dataganj | Death of T. Sahai | S. Kumari | Indian National Congress |
Source:ECI

== See also ==
- List of constituencies of the Uttar Pradesh Legislative Assembly
- 1969 elections in India
