= Lohaghat =

- Town
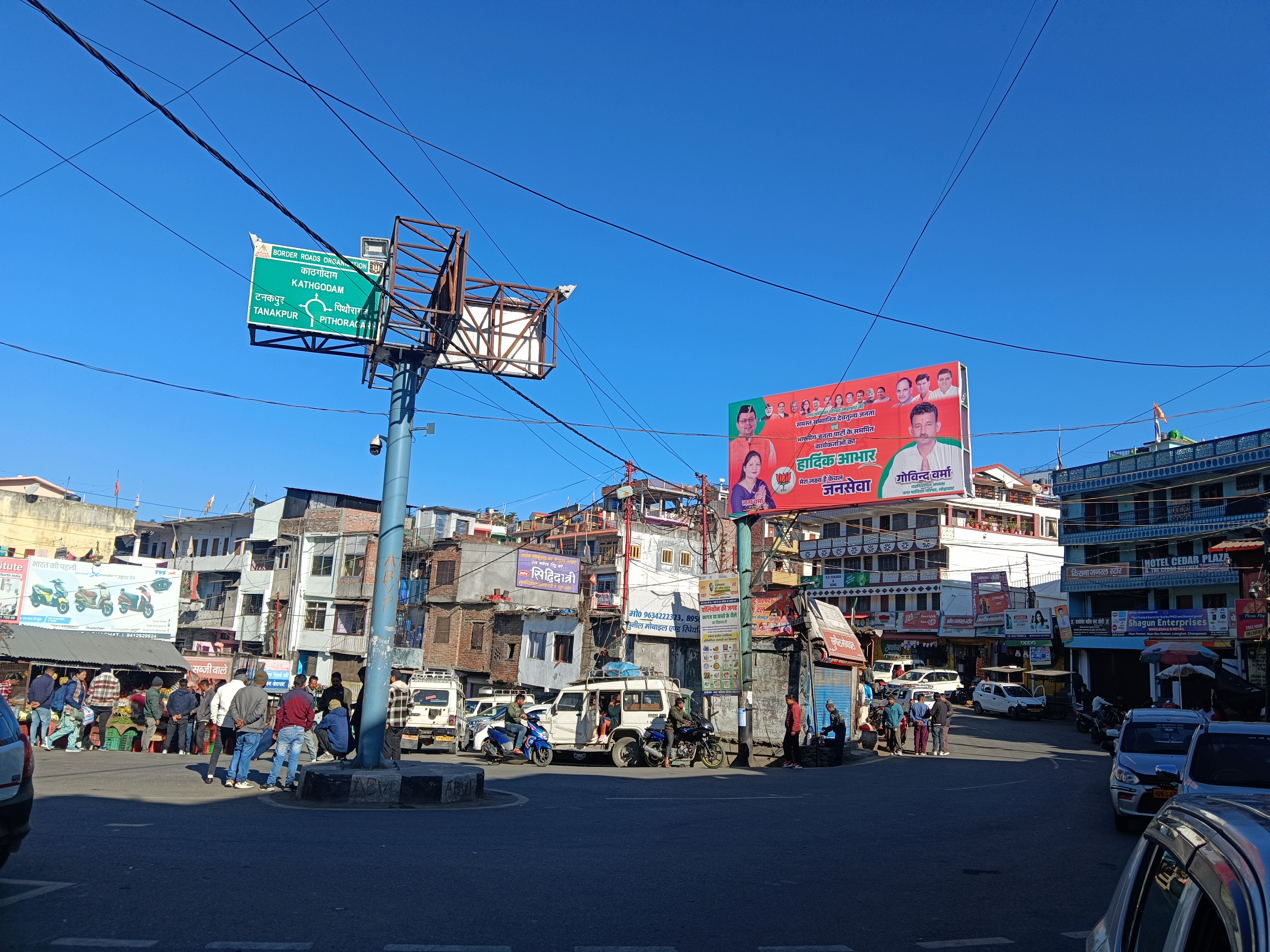
- Lohaghat Market

- Location in Uttarakhand, India Lohaghat (India)
- Coordinates: 29.42°N 80.10°E
- Country: India
- State: Uttarakhand
- District: Champawat

Area
  - Total: 4.5 km^{2} (1.7 sq mi)
- Elevation: 1,754 m (5,755 ft)

Population (2011)
  - Total: 7,954
  - Density: 1,800/km^{2} (4,600/sq mi)

Languages
  - Official: Hindi
  - Native: Kumaoni
- Time zone: UTC+5:30 (IST)
- PIN: 262524
- Area code: 05965
- Vehicle registration: UK 03

Lohaghat (Kumaoni: Loghāt) is a town and a nagar palika in Champawat district in the Indian state of Uttarakhand. Lohaghat is also famous for its various cultural events like Holi Rang Mahotsav, Devidhar Mela etc. The most special thing regarding Lohaghat is the Ramleela of Lohaghat which is one of the oldest Ramleela of the Kumaon division.

== History ==
Lohaghat and its surrounding region were earlier known as Sui, and the town has been a place of prominence since the rule of Katyuri kings. A scion of the Katyuri dynasty had established his principality at Sui in the eighth century. The rulers of Sui were feudatories to the Katyuris until the fragmentation of the Katyuri kingdom at the end of the 10th century, after which they became feudatories of Doti. Brahma Dev Katyuri, the last Katyuri governor of Sui was having trouble managing his areas due to several rebellions by local Khasia chiefs. The Khasia chiefs subsequently unified under a Raut king of Damkot thus increasing problems for Brahmadev, who married off his daughter to prince Somchand, bestowing his principality upon him as dowry.

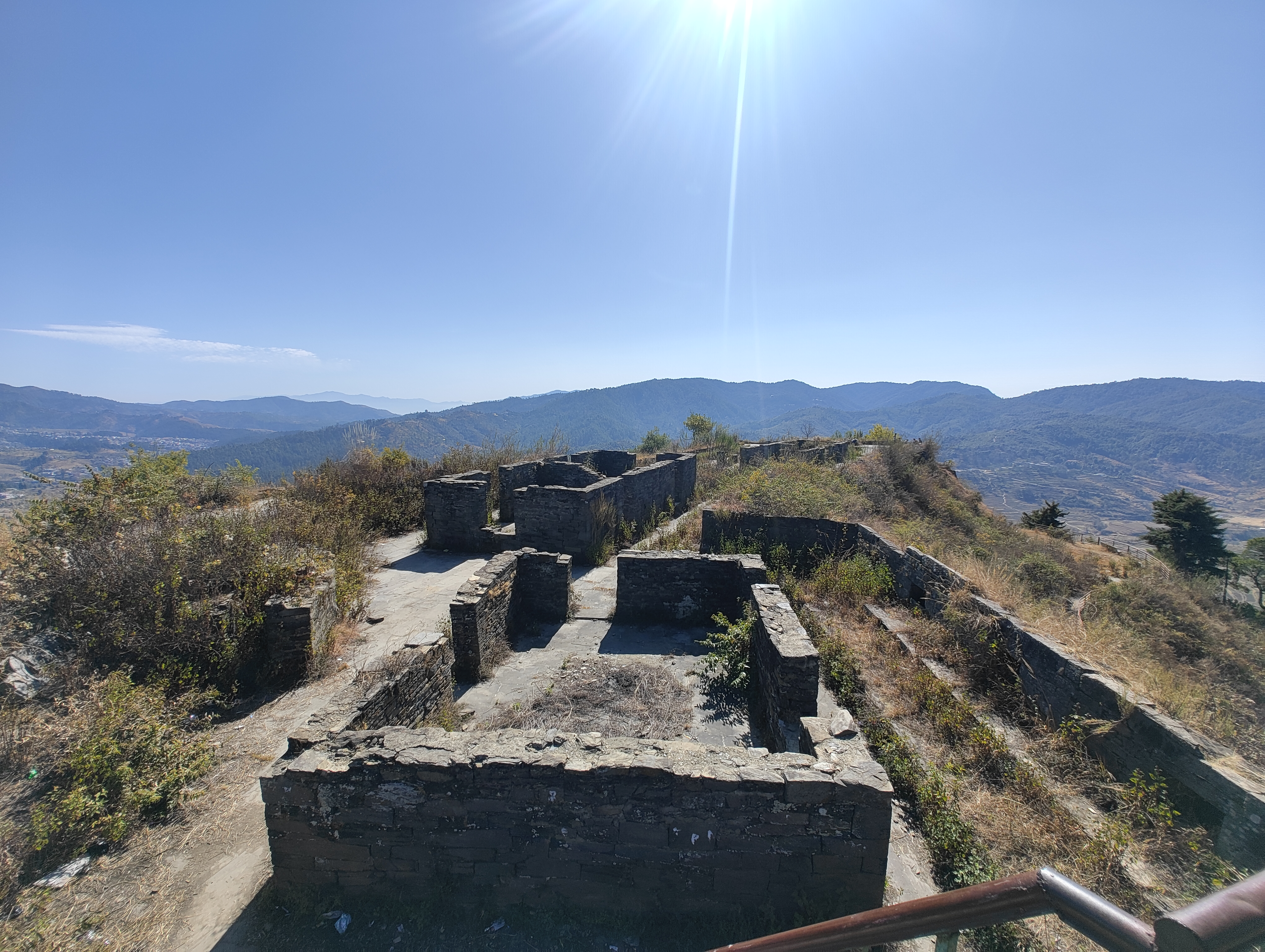
The Banasura fort was built by the Chand Kings in the 12th century.

Som Chand established his capital at Champawat and after defeating the Raut king of Sui with the help of his military officer Kalu Tadagi, bought the entire region under his authority thus laying the foundations of the rule of Chand dynasty in Kumaon. Lohaghat remained under the Kingdom of Kumaon until the fall of Almora at the hand of Gurkhas in 1790. The Banasur fort was built here by the Chand kings in the 12th century.

Lohaghat came under the control of the East India Company following the defeat of Gurkhas in Anglo-Nepal War of 1814 and the Treaty of Sugauli in 1816. The Britishers were impressed by the natural beauty of the place and began to settle here. The lands of Fernhill and Chanuwankhal were leased to Hensi and Mrs Hoskin for tea and fruit production. The lands of Hensi were later transferred to an Englishman named 'Talak' which came to be known as 'Talak Estate'.

The arrival of the British commenced an era of development in Lohaghat; efforts were made for development of education, health, revenue, legal, land settlement, construction of roads etc. Lohaghat was made the headquarters of the Kali Kumaon Sub Division. The jail built at that time still serves as the temporary prison of Champawat district. An army contingent was stationed also stationed here; barracks were built near the present hospital complex and a permanent camp was established at Lohaghat for which soldiers of the British Army were brought here from Hawalbagh in 1939. Maneuvers used to be carried out at the 'Chandmari' situated near the present location of the government inter college. However, a local rebellion of 1846 resulted in the removal of military camp from Lohaghat and the troops were transferred back to Hawalbagh until the establishment of another permanent Cantonment at Ranikhet.

When India became independent in 1947, Lohaghat was a pargana in the Champawat tehsil of Almora district of Uttar Pradesh. The construction of the Tanakpur-Tawaghat road in 1950 accelerated the development of Lohaghat. Lohaghat was incorporated into Pithoragarh district in 1982 and became a part of the Champawat district, when it was carved out of Pithoragarh district in 1997. Lohaghat was declared a town area on 10 December 1951, and was subsequently upgraded to a notified area on 12 July 1972 and a Nagar Panchayat on 4 June 1994. It was declared a Municipality on 25 May 2021.

== Geography and Climate ==
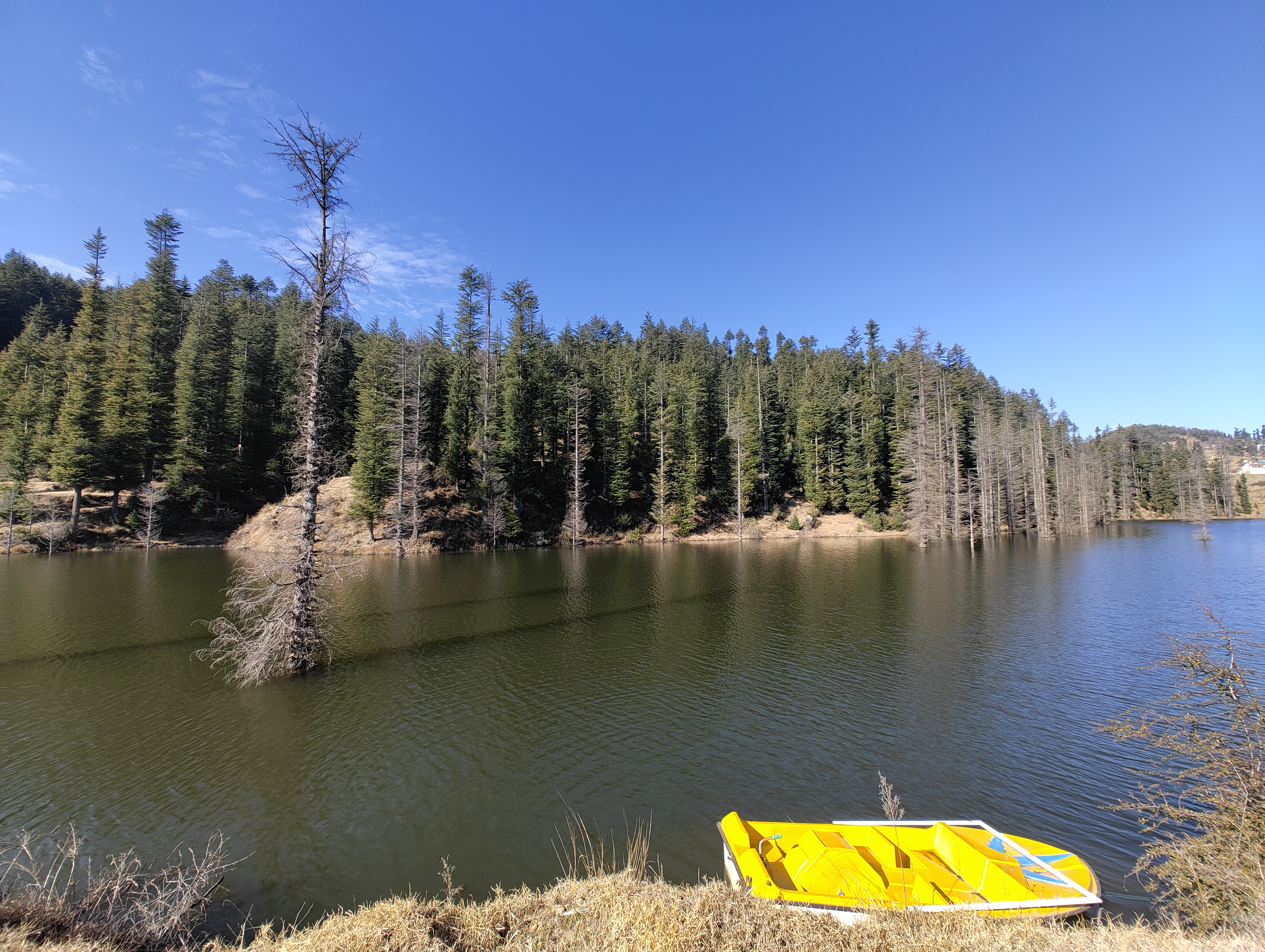
Koli Dhek Lake

Lohaghat is located at 29.42°N 80.10°E at an elevation of 1,788 metres (5,866 ft) above the mean sea level, and is spread over an area of 4.5 square kilometres (1.7 sq mi). It is located on the banks of the Lohawati river in the Champawat district, at a distance of 13 kilometres (8.1 mi) from the district headquarters at Champawat, 60 kilometres (37 mi) from Pithoragarh, 85 kilometres (53 mi) from Tanakpur, 120 kilometres (75 mi) from Almora and 40 kilometres (25 mi) from Pancheshwar at the Indo-Nepal Border. Lohaghat is also one of the five tehsils of Champawat, and is bound by the Barakot tehsil on the north, Nepal on the east, Pati tehsil on west and Champawat tehsil on the south.

Climate data for Lohaghat
| Month | Jan | Feb | Mar | Apr | May | Jun | Jul | Aug | Sep | Oct | Nov | Dec | Year |
|---|---|---|---|---|---|---|---|---|---|---|---|---|---|
| Record high °C (°F) | 20 (68) | 26 (79) | 31 (88) | 33 (91) | 34 (93) | 36 (97) | 34 (93) | 32 (90) | 31 (88) | 29 (84) | 23 (73) | 21 (70) | 36 (97) |
| Mean maximum °C (°F) | 13 (55) | 17 (63) | 22 (72) | 26 (79) | 29 (84) | 33 (91) | 30 (86) | 29 (84) | 27 (81) | 25 (77) | 23 (73) | 20 (68) | 33 (91) |
| Mean daily maximum °C (°F) | 12.6 (54.7) | 15.4 (59.7) | 23.8 (74.8) | 27.2 (81.0) | 29.5 (85.1) | 32.1 (89.8) | 26.3 (79.3) | 27.0 (80.6) | 24.6 (76.3) | 22.2 (72.0) | 18.5 (65.3) | 16.3 (61.3) | 23.0 (73.3) |
| Daily mean °C (°F) | 7.6 (45.7) | 8.9 (48.0) | 13.1 (55.6) | 17.6 (63.7) | 20.2 (68.4) | 20.9 (69.6) | 19.7 (67.5) | 19.5 (67.1) | 18.6 (65.5) | 16.1 (61.0) | 12.2 (54.0) | 9.0 (48.2) | 15.3 (59.5) |
| Mean daily minimum °C (°F) | 1.6 (34.9) | 3.5 (38.3) | 9.4 (48.9) | 12.2 (54.0) | 15.0 (59.0) | 16.8 (62.2) | 18.1 (64.6) | 17.0 (62.6) | 14.6 (58.3) | 11.0 (51.8) | 6.9 (44.4) | 3.8 (38.8) | 10.8 (51.5) |
| Mean minimum °C (°F) | 0 (32) | 6 (43) | 9 (48) | 13 (55) | 16 (61) | 19 (66) | 21 (70) | 21 (70) | 19 (66) | 16 (61) | 11 (52) | 7 (45) | 0 (32) |
| Record low °C (°F) | −12 (10) | −8 (18) | −4 (25) | −1 (30) | 2 (36) | 4 (39) | 9 (48) | 10 (50) | 6 (43) | 2 (36) | −6 (21) | −10 (14) | −12 (10) |
| Average rainfall mm (inches) | 62 (2.4) | 46 (1.8) | 58 (2.3) | 31 (1.2) | 64 (2.5) | 177 (7.0) | 390 (15.4) | 318 (12.5) | 195 (7.7) | 95 (3.7) | 9 (0.4) | 25 (1.0) | 1,470 (57.9) |
Source: Climate-Data.org

== Demographics ==
As of the 2011 India census, Lohaghat had a population of 7954. Males constitute 48% of the population and females 52%. The literacy rate of Lohaghat city is 80%. Male literacy is 82%, and female literacy is 78%. Population of children with age of 0-6 is 1057 which is 15% of total population of Lohaghat (IN).

== Transport ==
The nearest railhead is at Tanakpur, approximately 90 km (56 mi) away. Naini Saini Airport is the nearest airport. It is about 65 km (40 mi) from Lohaghat.

== Tehsil ==
- Pati
- Shri Poornagiri
- Champawat
- Lohaghat
- Barakot

== See also ==
- Advaita Ashrama
- Gurudwara Reetha Sahib
