= Krishna Chandra Punetha =

Indian politician (died 2020)

Krishna Chandra Punetha (died 23 September 2020) was an Indian politician and a member of the Bharatiya Janata Party. Punetha was a member of the Uttarakhand Legislative Assembly from the Pithoragarh constituency in Pithoragarh district. Punetha served two terms as a member of the Assembly.

Punetha died at his home in Lohaghat on 23 September 2020.
