= 1st Uttarakhand Assembly =

Legislature of Uttaranchal , India, 2002–2007

First Uttarakhand Legislative Assembly

Type
- Type: Unicameral
- Houses: Uttarakhand Legislative Assembly

History
- Preceded by: Interim Uttaranchal Assembly
- Succeeded by: 2nd Uttarakhand Assembly

Leadership
- Speaker: Yashpal Arya, INC
- Leader of the House: Narayan Datt Tiwari, INC
- Leader of the Opposition: Bhagat Singh Koshyari (2002–2003), BJP; Matbar Singh Kandari (2003–2007), BJP
- Chief Secretary: Madhukar Gupta, IAS

Structure
- Seats: 71^{[†]}
- Political groups: Government (36): INC (36); Opposition (19): BJP (19); Others (15): BSP (7); UKD (4); NCP (1); Independent (3); Nominated (1): INC (1)
- Length of term: 2002–2007

Elections
- Voting system: first-past-the-post
- Last election: 14 February 2002
- Next election: 21 February 2007

Meeting place
- Vidhan Bhavan, Dehradun, Uttarakhand

Website
- Uttarakhand Legislative Assembly

Constitution
- Constitution of India

Footnotes
- ^† 70 seats are open for the direct election while 1 seat is reserved for the member of Anglo-Indian community.

The 2002 Uttarakhand Legislative Assembly election (also Uttaranchal Legislative Assembly until 2007) were the First Vidhan Sabha (Legislative Assembly) elections of the state when the Indian National Congress emerged as the largest party with 36 seats in the 71-seat legislature in the election. The Bharatiya Janata Party became the official opposition, holding 19 seats.

== Party position in the Assembly ==
Rank	Party	Abbr.	Seats	Leader in the House
1	Indian National Congress	INC	37	Narayan Datt Tiwari
2	Bharatiya Janata Party	BJP	19	Bhagat Singh Koshyari (2002–2003); Matbar Singh Kandari (2003–2007)
3	Bahujan Samaj Party	BSP	07	Narayan Pal
4	Uttarakhand Kranti Dal	UKD	04	Bipin Chandra Tripathi (2002-2004); Kashi Singh Airy (2004-2007)
5	Nationalist Congress Party	NCP	01	Balvir Singh Negi
6	Independent	Ind.	03	N/A
	Total		71	

== Key post holders in the Assembly ==
- Speaker : Yashpal Arya
- Deputy Speaker : Vacant
- Leader of the House: Narayan Datt Tiwari
- Leader of the Opposition : Bhagat Singh Koshyari (2002–2003)
  Matbar Singh Kandari (2003–2004)
- Chief Secretary : Madhukar Gupta

== Members of the First Uttaranchal Assembly ==
S. No.	Constituency	Elected Member	Party affiliation
1	Purola (SC)	Mal Chand	BJP
2	Gangotri	Vijaypal Singh Sajwan	INC
3	Yamunotri	Pritam Singh Panwar	UKD
4	Pratapnagar	Phul Singh Bisht	INC
5	Tehri	Kishore Upadhyaya	INC
6	Ghansali	Balvir Singh Negi	NCP
7	Devprayag	Mantri Prasad Naithani	INC
8	Narendranagar	Subodh Uniyal	INC
9	Dhanaulti (SC)	Kaul Das	INC
10	Chakrata (ST)	Pritam Singh	INC
11	Vikasnagar	Nav Prabhat	INC
12	Sahaspur (SC)	Sadhu Ram	INC
13	Lakshman Chowk	Dinesh Agrawal	INC
14	Dehradun	Harbans Kapoor	BJP
15	Rajpur	Hira Singh Bisht	INC
16	Mussoorie	Jot Singh Gunsola	INC
17	Rishikesh	Shoorveer Singh Sajwan	INC
18	Doiwala	Trivendra Singh Rawat	BJP
19	Bhagwanpur (SC)	Chandra Shekhar	BJP
20	Roorkee	Suresh Chand Jain	BJP
21	Iqbalpur	Yashveer Singh	BSP
22	Manglaur	Muhammad Nizamuddin	BSP
23	Landhaura (SC)	Hari Das	BSP
24	Laksar	Pranav Singh 'Champion'	Independent
25	Bahadarabad	Muhammad Shahzad	BSP
26	Haridwar	Madan Kaushik	BJP
27	Laldhang	Taslim Ahmad	BSP
28	Yamkeshwar	Vijaya Barthwal	BJP
29	Kotdwar	Surendra Singh Negi^{§}	INC
30	Dhumakot	Lt. Gen. Tejpal Singh Rawat (Retd.)	INC
31	Bironkhal	Amrita Rawat	INC
32	Lansdowne	Dr. Harak Singh Rawat	INC
33	Pauri	Narendra Singh Bhandari	INC
34	Sringar (SC)	Sundar Lal Mandrawal	INC
35	Thalisain	Ganesh Godiyal	INC
36	Rudraprayag	Matbar Singh Kandari	BJP
37	Kedarnath	Asha Nautiyal	BJP
38	Badrinath	Dr. Anusuya Prasad Maikhuri	INC
39	Nandaprayag	Mahendra Bhatt	BJP
40	Karnaprayag	Anil Nautiyal	BJP
41	Pindar (SC)	Govind Lal	BJP
42	Kapkot	Bhagat Singh Koshyari	BJP
43	Kanda	Ummed Singh Majila	INC
44	Bageshwar (SC)	Ram Prasad Tamta	INC
45	Dwarahat	Bipin Chandra Tripathi^{†}	UKD
46	Bhikiyasain	Dr. Pratap Singh Bisht	INC
47	Salt	Ranjit Singh Rawat	INC
48	Ranikhet	Ajay Bhatt	BJP
49	Someshwar (SC)	Pradeep Tamta	INC
50	Almora	Kailash Sharma	BJP
51	Jageshwar	Govind Singh Kunjwal	INC
52	Mukteshwar (SC)	Yashpal Arya	INC
53	Dhari	Harish Chandra Durgapal	INC
54	Haldwani	Dr. Indira Hridayesh	INC
55	Nainital	Dr. Narayan Singh Jantwal	UKD
56	Ramnagar	Yogambar Singh Rawat^{‡}	INC
57	Jaspur	Dr. Shailendra Mohan Singhal	Independent
58	Kashipur	Harbhajan Singh Cheema	BJP
59	Bajpur	Arvind Pandey	BJP
60	Pantnagar–Gadarpur	Premanand Mahajan	BSP
61	Rudrapur–Kichha	Tilak Raj Behar	INC
62	Sitarganj (SC)	Narayan Pal	BSP
63	Khatima (ST)	Gopal Singh Rana	INC
64	Champawat	Hemesh Kharkwal	INC
65	Lohaghat	Mahendra Singh Mahra	INC
66	Pithoragarh	Prakash Pant	BJP
67	Gangolihat (SC)	Narayan Ram Arya	INC
68	Didihat	Bishan Singh Chuphal	BJP
69	Kanalichhina	Kashi Singh Airy	UKD
70	Dharchula (ST)	Gagan Singh Rajwar	Independent
71	Anglo-Indian	Russell Valentine Gardner	INC

=== By-elections ===
S. No.	Constituency	Elected Member	Party affiliation
56	Ramnagar	Narayan Datt Tiwari	INC
45	Dwarahat	Pushpesh Tripathi	UKD
28	Kotdwar	Surendra Singh Negi	INC

== See also ==
- 2002 Uttaranchal Legislative Assembly election
- Tiwari ministry
- Politics of Uttarakhand

== Notes ==
- ^{§} – Disqualified from office
- ^{‡} – Resigned from office
