= 2nd Uttarakhand Assembly =

Second Uttarakhand Legislative Assembly

Type
- Type: Unicameral
- Houses: Uttarakhand Legislative Assembly

History
- Preceded by: 1st Uttarakhand Assembly
- Succeeded by: 3rd Uttarakhand Assembly

Leadership
- Speaker: Harbans Kapoor, BJP
- Deputy Speaker: Vijaya Barthwal (2008–2009), BJP
- Leader of the House: Bhuwan Chandra Khanduri (2007–2009), BJP; Ramesh Pokhriyal 'Nihsank' (2009–2011), BJP; Bhuwan Chandra Khanduri (2011–2012), BJP
- Leader of the Opposition: Harak Singh Rawat, INC
- Chief Secretary: Surjit Kumar Das, IAS

Structure
- Seats: 71^{[†]}
- Political groups: Government (42): BJP (36); UKD (3); Independent (3); Opposition (20): INC (20); Others (8): BSP (8); Nominated (1): BJP (1)
- Length of term: 2007–2012

Elections
- Voting system: first-past-the-post
- Last election: 21 February 2007
- Next election: 30 January 2012

Meeting place
- Vidhan Bhavan, Dehradun, Uttarakhand

Website
- Uttarakhand Legislative Assembly

Constitution
- Constitution of India

Footnotes
- ^† 70 seats are open for the direct election while 1 seat is reserved for the member of Anglo-Indian community.

The 2007 Uttarakhand Legislative Assembly election were the second Vidhan Sabha (Legislative Assembly) election of the state. The elections were held on 21 February 2007, when the Bharatiya Janata Party emerged as the largest party with 35 seats in the 71-seat legislature. One seat short of forming a majority, the BJP have had to rely on support from the Uttarakhand Kranti Dal and three Independents to form the government. The Indian National Congress became the official opposition, holding 21 seats.

== Party position in the Assembly ==
Rank	Party	Abbr.	Seats	Leader in the House
1	Bharatiya Janata Party	BJP	37	Bhuwan Chandra Khanduri (2007–2009); Ramesh Pokhriyal 'Nihsank' (2009–2011); Bhuwan Chandra Khanduri (2011–2012)
2	Uttarakhand Kranti Dal	UKD	03	Diwakar Bhatt
3	Independent	Ind.	03	N/A
4	Indian National Congress	INC	20	Harak Singh Rawat
5	Bahujan Samaj Party	BSP	08	Narayan Pal
	Total		71	

== Key post holders in the Assembly ==
- Speaker : Harbans Kapoor
- Deputy Speaker : Vijaya Barthwal (2008–2009)
- Leader of the House: Bhuwan Chandra Khanduri (2007–2009)
  Ramesh Pokhriyal 'Nihsank' (2009–2011)
  Bhuwan Chandra Khanduri (2011–2012)
- Leader of the Opposition : Harak Singh Rawat
- Chief Secretary : Surjit Kumar Das

== Members of the Second Uttarkhand Assembly ==
S. No.	Constituency	Elected Member	Party affiliation
1	Purola (SC)	Rajesh Juwantha	INC
2	Gangotri	Gopal Singh Rawat	BJP
3	Yamunotri	Kedar Singh Rawat	INC
4	Pratapnagar	Vijay Singh Panwar	BJP
5	Tehri	Kishore Upadhyaya	INC
6	Ghansali	Balvir Singh Negi	INC
7	Devprayag	Diwakar Bhatt	UKD
8	Narendranagar	Om Gopal Rawat	UKD
9	Dhanaulti (SC)	Khajan Dass	BJP
10	Chakrata (ST)	Pritam Singh	INC
11	Vikasnagar	Munna Singh Chauhan^{‡}	BJP
12	Sahaspur (SC)	Rajkumar	BJP
13	Lakshman Chowk	Dinesh Agrawal	INC
14	Dehradun	Harbans Kapoor	BJP
15	Rajpur	Ganesh Joshi	BJP
16	Mussoorie	Jot Singh Gunsola	INC
17	Rishikesh	Premchand Aggarwal	BJP
18	Doiwala	Trivendra Singh Rawat	BJP
19	Bhagwanpur (SC)	Surendra Rakesh	BSP
20	Roorkee	Suresh Chand Jain	BJP
21	Iqbalpur	Yashveer Singh	BSP
22	Manglaur	Muhammad Nizamuddin	BSP
23	Landhaura (SC)	Hari Das	BSP
24	Laksar	Pranav Singh 'Champion'	INC
25	Bahadarabad	Muhammad Shahzad	BSP
26	Haridwar	Madan Kaushik	BJP
27	Laldhang	Taslim Ahmad	BSP
28	Yamkeshwar	Vijaya Barthwal	BJP
29	Kotdwar	Shailendra Singh Rawat	BJP
30	Dhumakot	Lt. Gen. Tejpal Singh Rawat (Retd.)^{‡}	INC
31	Bironkhal	Amrita Rawat	INC
32	Lansdowne	Dr. Harak Singh Rawat	INC
33	Pauri	Yashpal Benam	Independent
34	Srinagar (SC)	Brijmohan Kotwal	BJP
35	Thalisain	Dr. Ramesh Pokhriyal 'Nishank'	BJP
36	Rudraprayag	Matbar Singh Kandari	BJP
37	Kedarnath	Asha Nautiyal	BJP
38	Badrinath	Kedar Singh Phonia	BJP
39	Nandaprayag	Rajendra Singh Bhandari	Independent
40	Karnaprayag	Anil Nautiyal	BJP
41	Pindar (SC)	Govind Lal	BJP
42	Kapkot	Bhagat Singh Koshyari^{#}	BJP
43	Kanda	Balwant Singh Bhauryal	BJP
44	Bageshwar (SC)	Chandan Ram Das	BJP
45	Dwarahat	Pushpesh Tripathi	UKD
46	Bhikiyasain	Surendra Singh Jeena	BJP
47	Salt	Ranjit Singh Rawat	INC
48	Ranikhet	Karan Mahra	INC
49	Someshwar (SC)	Ajay Tamta	BJP
50	Almora	Manoj Tiwari	INC
51	Jageshwar	Govind Singh Kunjwal	INC
52	Mukteshwar (SC)	Yashpal Arya	INC
53	Dhari	Govind Singh Bisht	BJP
54	Haldwani	Banshidhar Bhagat	BJP
55	Nainital	Kharak Singh Bohra	BJP
56	Ramnagar	Diwan Singh Bisht	BJP
57	Jaspur	Dr. Shailendra Mohan Singhal	INC
58	Kashipur	Harbhajan Singh Cheema	BJP
59	Bajpur	Arvind Pandey	BJP
60	Pantnagar–Gadarpur	Premanand Mahajan	BSP
61	Rudrapur–Kichha	Tilak Raj Behar	INC
62	Sitarganj (SC)	Narayan Pal	BSP
63	Khatima (ST)	Gopal Singh Rana	INC
64	Champawat	Vina Mahrana	BJP
65	Lohaghat	Mahendra Singh Mahra	INC
66	Pithoragarh	Prakash Pant	BJP
67	Gangolihat (SC)	Joga Ram Tamta	BJP
68	Didihat	Bishan Singh Chuphal	BJP
69	Kanalichhina	Mayukh Singh Mahar	INC
70	Dharchula (ST)	Gagan Singh Rajwar	Independent
71	Anglo-Indian	Karen Meyer Hilton	BJP

=== By-elections ===
S. No.	Constituency	Elected Member	Party affiliation
11	Vikasnagar	Kuldeep Kumar	BJP
30	Dhumakot	Maj. Gen. Bhuwan Chandra Khanduri (Retd.)	BJP
42	Kapkot	Sher Singh Garhia	BJP

== See also ==
- 2007 Uttarakhand Legislative Assembly election
- First Khanduri ministry
- Pokhriyal ministry
- Second Khanduri ministry
- Politics of Uttarakhand

== Notes ==
- ^{‡} – Resigned from office
- ^{#} – Elected to the Rajya Sabha
