= List of constituencies of the Uttarakhand Legislative Assembly =

Uttarakhand Legislative Assembly Uttarakhand Vidhan Sabha
- 5th Assembly

Type
- Type: Unicameral
- Term limits: 5 years

History
- Founded: 14 February 2002
- Preceded by: Interim Uttaranchal Assembly
- Seats: 70

Elections
- Last election: 14 February 2022
- Next election: 2027

Meeting place
- Vidhan Sabha Bhavan, Gairsain (summer); Vidhan Sabha Bhavan, Dehradun (winter)

Website
- Uttarakhand Legislative Assembly

Constituencies of the Uttarakhand Legislative Assembly

The Uttarakhand Legislative Assembly is the unicameral legislature of the Indian state of Uttarakhand.

The seats of the legislative assembly are at Dehradun and Gairsain, the capitals of the state. The term of the Legislative Assembly is five years, unless dissolved earlier. It currently has 70 members, who are directly elected from single-seat constituencies. Currently there are 13 reserved seats for scheduled caste and 2 for Scheduled Tribes.

== Constituencies ==
The following is the list of the constituencies of the Uttarakhand Legislative Assembly as of recent-most delimitation of the legislative assembly constituencies in 2008.

#	Name	Reserved for (SC/ST/None)	District	Lok Sabha constituency	Electors (2024)
1	Purola	SC	Uttarkashi	Tehri Garhwal	76,944
2	Yamunotri	None	Uttarkashi	Tehri Garhwal	79,581
3	Gangotri	None	Uttarkashi	Tehri Garhwal	86,898
4	Badrinath	None	Chamoli	Garhwal	102,145
5	Tharali	SC	Chamoli	Garhwal	103,543
6	Karnaprayag	None	Chamoli	Garhwal	94,522
7	Kedarnath	None	Rudraprayag	Garhwal	90,839
8	Rudraprayag	None	Rudraprayag	Garhwal	103,675
9	Ghansali	SC	Tehri Garhwal	Tehri Garhwal	98,409
10	Devprayag	None	Tehri Garhwal	Garhwal	86,070
11	Narendranagar	None	Tehri Garhwal	Garhwal	91,540
12	Pratapnagar	None	Tehri Garhwal	Tehri Garhwal	85,229
13	Tehri	None	Tehri Garhwal	Tehri Garhwal	84,207
14	Dhanaulti	None	Tehri Garhwal	Tehri Garhwal	86,036
15	Chakrata	ST	Dehradun	Tehri Garhwal	105,064
16	Vikasnagar	None	Dehradun	Tehri Garhwal	107,308
17	Sahaspur	None	Dehradun	Tehri Garhwal	171,762
18	Dharampur	None	Dehradun	Haridwar	206,737
19	Raipur	None	Dehradun	Tehri Garhwal	177,176
20	Rajpur Road	SC	Dehradun	Tehri Garhwal	119,301
21	Dehradun Cantonment	None	Dehradun	Tehri Garhwal	134,911
22	Mussoorie	None	Dehradun	Tehri Garhwal	131,816
23	Doiwala	None	Dehradun	Haridwar	165,776
24	Rishikesh	None	Dehradun	Haridwar	167,924
25	Haridwar	None	Haridwar	Haridwar	149,108
26	BHEL Ranipur	None	Haridwar	Haridwar	163,883
27	Jwalapur	SC	Haridwar	Haridwar	116,836
28	Bhagwanpur	SC	Haridwar	Haridwar	123,476
29	Jhabrera	SC	Haridwar	Haridwar	121,491
30	Piran Kaliyar	None	Haridwar	Haridwar	127,118
31	Roorkee	None	Haridwar	Haridwar	121,468
32	Khanpur	None	Haridwar	Haridwar	147,459
33	Manglaur	None	Haridwar	Haridwar	115,978
34	Laksar	None	Haridwar	Haridwar	102,483
35	Haridwar Rural	None	Haridwar	Haridwar	130,882
36	Yamkeshwar	None	Pauri Garhwal	Garhwal	88,734
37	Pauri	SC	Pauri Garhwal	Garhwal	93,158
38	Srinagar	None	Pauri Garhwal	Garhwal	107,347
39	Chaubattakhal	None	Pauri Garhwal	Garhwal	91,136
40	Lansdowne	None	Pauri Garhwal	Garhwal	83,460
41	Kotdwar	None	Pauri Garhwal	Garhwal	115,891
42	Dharchula	None	Pithoragarh	Almora	87,747
43	Didihat	None	Pithoragarh	Almora	82,849
44	Pithoragarh	None	Pithoragarh	Almora	109,705
45	Gangolihat	SC	Pithoragarh	Almora	102,791
46	Kapkot	None	Bageshwar	Almora	99,309
47	Bageshwar	SC	Bageshwar	Almora	118,311
48	Dwarahat	None	Almora	Almora	92,567
49	Salt	None	Almora	Almora	97,035
50	Ranikhet	None	Almora	Almora	79,653
51	Someshwar	SC	Almora	Almora	87,411
52	Almora	None	Almora	Almora	90,372
53	Jageshwar	None	Almora	Almora	93,523
54	Lohaghat	None	Champawat	Almora	107,240
55	Champawat	None	Champawat	Almora	96,016
56	Lalkuan	None	Nainital	Nainital–Udhamsingh Nagar	120,392
57	Bhimtal	None	Nainital	Nainital–Udhamsingh Nagar	100,634
58	Nainital	SC	Nainital	Nainital–Udhamsingh Nagar	109,970
59	Haldwani	None	Nainital	Nainital–Udhamsingh Nagar	151,396
60	Kaladhungi	None	Nainital	Nainital–Udhamsingh Nagar	171,639
61	Ramnagar	None	Nainital	Garhwal	121,868
62	Jaspur	None	Udham Singh Nagar	Nainital–Udhamsingh Nagar	132,654
63	Kashipur	None	Udham Singh Nagar	Nainital–Udhamsingh Nagar	176,740
64	Bajpur	SC	Udham Singh Nagar	Nainital–Udhamsingh Nagar	151,666
65	Gadarpur	None	Udham Singh Nagar	Nainital–Udhamsingh Nagar	143,746
66	Rudrapur	None	Udham Singh Nagar	Nainital–Udhamsingh Nagar	192,593
67	Kichha	None	Udham Singh Nagar	Nainital–Udhamsingh Nagar	139,525
68	Sitarganj	None	Udham Singh Nagar	Nainital–Udhamsingh Nagar	122,713
69	Nanakmatta	ST	Udham Singh Nagar	Nainital–Udhamsingh Nagar	123,694
70	Khatima	None	Udham Singh Nagar	Nainital–Udhamsingh Nagar	120,145

== Former constituencies ==
Constituency		Existed between	District	Lok Sabha constituency	
Name	Reserved for (SC/ST/None)	Existed between	District	Name	Reserved for (SC/ST/None)
Badri–Kedar	None	2000–2002	Chamoli/Rudraprayag	Garhwal	None
Bahadarabad	None	2002–2012	Haridwar	Haridwar	SC (2000–2009); None (2009–2012)
Bhikiyasain	None	2002–2012	Almora	Almora	None (2000–2009); SC (2009–2012)
Bironkhal	None	2002–2012	Pauri Garhwal	Garhwal	None
Dehradun	None	2000–2012	Dehradun	Tehri Garhwal	None
Dhari	None	2002–2012	Nainital	Nainital (2000–2009); Nainital–Udhamsingh Nagar (2009–2012)	None
Dhumakot	None	2002–2012	Pauri Garhwal	Garhwal	None
Iqbalpur	None	2002–2012	Haridwar	Haridwar	SC (2000–2009); None (2009–2012)
Kanalichhina	None	2002–2012	Pithoragarh	Almora	None (2000–2009); SC (2009–2012)
Kanda	None	2002–2012	Bageshwar	Almora	None (2000–2009); SC (2009–2012)
Lakshman Chowk	None	2002–2012	Dehradun	Tehri Garhwal	None
Laldhang	None	2002–2012	Haridwar	Haridwar	SC (2000–2009); None (2009–2012)
Landhaura	SC	2002–2012	Haridwar	Haridwar	SC (2000–2009); None (2009–2012)
Mukteshwar	SC	2002–2012	Nainital	Nainital (2000–2009); Nainital–Udhamsingh Nagar (2009–2012)	None
Nandaprayag	None	2002–2012	Chamoli	Garhwal	None
Pantnagar–Gadarpur	None	2002–2012	Udham Singh Nagar	Nainital (2000–2009); Nainital–Udhamsingh Nagar (2009–2012)	None
Pindar	SC	2002–2012	Chamoli	Garhwal	None
Rajpur	None	2002–2012	Dehradun	Tehri Garhwal	None
Rudrapur–Kichha	None	2002–2012	Udham Singh Nagar	Nainital (2000–2009); Nainital–Udhamsingh Nagar (2009–2012)	None
Thalisain	None	2002–2012	Pauri Garhwal	Garhwal	None
Uttarkashi	SC	2000–2002	Uttarkashi	Tehri Garhwal	None

=== Constituencies abolished in 2001 ===
==== Chamoli district and Rudraprayag district ====
1. Badri–Kedar constituency replaced by Badrinath constituency in Chamoli district and, Kedarnath constituency and Rudraprayag constituency in Rudraprayag district

==== Uttarkashi district ====
1. Uttarkashi constituency (SC) replaced by Gangotri constituency, Purola constituency (SC) and Yamunotri constituency in Uttarkashi district

=== Constituencies abolished in 2011 ===
==== Almora district ====
1. Bhikiyasain constituency

==== Bageshwar district ====
1. Kanda constituency

==== Chamoli district ====
1. Pindar constituency (SC) replaced by Tharali constituency (SC) in Chamoli district
2. Nandaprayag constituency

==== Dehradun district ====
1. Dehradun constituency replaced by Dehradun Cantonment constituency in Dehradun district
2. Lakshman Chowk constituency replaced by Dharampur constituency in Dehradun district
3. Rajpur constituency replaced by Rajpur Road constituency (SC) in Dehradun district

==== Haridwar district ====
1. Bahadarabad constituency replaced by Jwalapur constituency (SC) in Haridwar district
2. Iqbalpur constituency replaced by Piran Kaliyar constituency in Haridwar district
3. Laldhang constituency replaced by Haridwar Rural constituency in Haridwar district
4. Landhaura constituency (SC) replaced by Khanpur constituency in Haridwar district

==== Nainital district ====
1. Dhari constituency
2. Mukteshwar constituency (SC) replaced by Bhimtal constituency in Nainital district

==== Pauri Garhwal district ====
1. Bironkhal constituency replaced by Chaubattakhal constituency in Pauri Garhwal district
2. Dhumakot constituency
3. Thalisain constituency

==== Pithoragarh district ====
1. Kanalichhina constituency

==== Udham Singh Nagar district ====
1. Pantnagar–Gadarpur constituency replaced with Gadarpur constituency
2. Rudrapur–Kichha constituency replaced with Rudrapur constituency and Kichha constituency

=== Anglo-Indian reserved seat in the Uttarakhand Legislative Assembly ===
Between 2002 and 2020, one seat was reserved in the Uttarakhand Legislative Assembly for members of the Anglo-Indian community. The member was nominated by the Governor of Uttarakhand on the advice of the Government of Uttarakhand. In January 2020, the Anglo-Indian reserved seats in the Parliament and State Legislatures of India were abolished.

=== See also ===
- List of former constituencies of the Lok Sabha
- List of parliamentary constituencies in Uttarakhand

=== External links ===
- "Vidhan Sabha Election - 2022: Chief Electoral Officer, Government Of Uttarakhand, India". ceo.uk.gov.in.
- ceo.uk.gov.in
- gov.ua.nic.in
- gov.ua.nic.in
