= List of parliamentary constituencies in Uttarakhand =

Parliamentary Constituencies in Uttarakhand

The following is the list of the parliamentary constituencies in Uttarakhand as of recent-most delimitation of the Lok Sabha constituencies in 2008.

== Lok Sabha ==
=== Current constituencies ===
The Lok Sabha (meaning "House of the People") is the lower house of the Parliament of India. Uttarakhand state elects five members and they are directly elected by the state electorates of Uttarakhand. Members are elected for five years with first-past-the-post voting. The number of seats, allocated to the state/union territory are determined by the population of the state/union territory.

Constituencies of the Lok Sabha in Uttarakhand

Keys: BJP (5)
Source: Parliament of India (Lok Sabha)

Constituency			Electors (2024)	Assembly constituency segment			Current member	Party	Current house	Election
No.	Name	Reserved for (SC/ST/None)	Electors (2024)	No.	Name	Reserved for (SC/ST/None)	Current member	Party	Current house	Election
1	Tehri Garhwal	None		1	Purola	SC	Mala Rajya Laxmi Shah	Bharatiya Janata Party	18th Lok Sabha	2024
1	Tehri Garhwal	None		2	Yamunotri	None	Mala Rajya Laxmi Shah	Bharatiya Janata Party	18th Lok Sabha	2024
1	Tehri Garhwal	None		3	Gangotri	None	Mala Rajya Laxmi Shah	Bharatiya Janata Party	18th Lok Sabha	2024
1	Tehri Garhwal	None		9	Ghansali	SC	Mala Rajya Laxmi Shah	Bharatiya Janata Party	18th Lok Sabha	2024
1	Tehri Garhwal	None		12	Pratapnagar	None	Mala Rajya Laxmi Shah	Bharatiya Janata Party	18th Lok Sabha	2024
1	Tehri Garhwal	None		13	Tehri	None	Mala Rajya Laxmi Shah	Bharatiya Janata Party	18th Lok Sabha	2024
1	Tehri Garhwal	None		14	Dhanaulti	None	Mala Rajya Laxmi Shah	Bharatiya Janata Party	18th Lok Sabha	2024
1	Tehri Garhwal	None		15	Chakrata	ST	Mala Rajya Laxmi Shah	Bharatiya Janata Party	18th Lok Sabha	2024
1	Tehri Garhwal	None		16	Vikasnagar	None	Mala Rajya Laxmi Shah	Bharatiya Janata Party	18th Lok Sabha	2024
1	Tehri Garhwal	None		17	Sahaspur	None	Mala Rajya Laxmi Shah	Bharatiya Janata Party	18th Lok Sabha	2024
1	Tehri Garhwal	None		19	Raipur	None	Mala Rajya Laxmi Shah	Bharatiya Janata Party	18th Lok Sabha	2024
1	Tehri Garhwal	None		20	Rajpur Road	SC	Mala Rajya Laxmi Shah	Bharatiya Janata Party	18th Lok Sabha	2024
1	Tehri Garhwal	None		21	Dehradun Cantonment	None	Mala Rajya Laxmi Shah	Bharatiya Janata Party	18th Lok Sabha	2024
1	Tehri Garhwal	None		22	Mussoorie	None	Mala Rajya Laxmi Shah	Bharatiya Janata Party	18th Lok Sabha	2024
2	Garhwal	None		4	Badrinath	None	Anil Baluni	Bharatiya Janata Party	18th Lok Sabha	2024
2	Garhwal	None		5	Tharali	SC	Anil Baluni	Bharatiya Janata Party	18th Lok Sabha	2024
2	Garhwal	None		6	Karnaprayag	None	Anil Baluni	Bharatiya Janata Party	18th Lok Sabha	2024
2	Garhwal	None		7	Kedarnath	None	Anil Baluni	Bharatiya Janata Party	18th Lok Sabha	2024
2	Garhwal	None		8	Rudraprayag	None	Anil Baluni	Bharatiya Janata Party	18th Lok Sabha	2024
2	Garhwal	None		10	Devprayag	None	Anil Baluni	Bharatiya Janata Party	18th Lok Sabha	2024
2	Garhwal	None		11	Narendranagar	None	Anil Baluni	Bharatiya Janata Party	18th Lok Sabha	2024
2	Garhwal	None		36	Yamkeshwar	None	Anil Baluni	Bharatiya Janata Party	18th Lok Sabha	2024
2	Garhwal	None		37	Pauri	SC	Anil Baluni	Bharatiya Janata Party	18th Lok Sabha	2024
2	Garhwal	None		38	Srinagar	None	Anil Baluni	Bharatiya Janata Party	18th Lok Sabha	2024
2	Garhwal	None		39	Chaubattakhal	None	Anil Baluni	Bharatiya Janata Party	18th Lok Sabha	2024
2	Garhwal	None		40	Lansdowne	None	Anil Baluni	Bharatiya Janata Party	18th Lok Sabha	2024
2	Garhwal	None		41	Kotdwar	None	Anil Baluni	Bharatiya Janata Party	18th Lok Sabha	2024
2	Garhwal	None		61	Ramnagar	None	Anil Baluni	Bharatiya Janata Party	18th Lok Sabha	2024
3	Almora	SC		42	Dharchula	None	Ajay Tamta	Bharatiya Janata Party	18th Lok Sabha	2024
3	Almora	SC		43	Didihat	None	Ajay Tamta	Bharatiya Janata Party	18th Lok Sabha	2024
3	Almora	SC		44	Pithoragarh	None	Ajay Tamta	Bharatiya Janata Party	18th Lok Sabha	2024
3	Almora	SC		45	Gangolihat	SC	Ajay Tamta	Bharatiya Janata Party	18th Lok Sabha	2024
3	Almora	SC		46	Kapkot	None	Ajay Tamta	Bharatiya Janata Party	18th Lok Sabha	2024
3	Almora	SC		47	Bageshwar	SC	Ajay Tamta	Bharatiya Janata Party	18th Lok Sabha	2024
3	Almora	SC		48	Dwarahat	None	Ajay Tamta	Bharatiya Janata Party	18th Lok Sabha	2024
3	Almora	SC		49	Salt	None	Ajay Tamta	Bharatiya Janata Party	18th Lok Sabha	2024
3	Almora	SC		50	Ranikhet	None	Ajay Tamta	Bharatiya Janata Party	18th Lok Sabha	2024
3	Almora	SC		51	Someshwar	SC	Ajay Tamta	Bharatiya Janata Party	18th Lok Sabha	2024
3	Almora	SC		52	Almora	None	Ajay Tamta	Bharatiya Janata Party	18th Lok Sabha	2024
3	Almora	SC		53	Jageshwar	None	Ajay Tamta	Bharatiya Janata Party	18th Lok Sabha	2024
3	Almora	SC		54	Lohaghat	None	Ajay Tamta	Bharatiya Janata Party	18th Lok Sabha	2024
3	Almora	SC		55	Champawat	None	Ajay Tamta	Bharatiya Janata Party	18th Lok Sabha	2024
4	Nainital–Udhamsingh Nagar	None		56	Lalkuan	None	Ajay Bhatt	Bharatiya Janata Party	18th Lok Sabha	2024
4	Nainital–Udhamsingh Nagar	None		57	Bhimtal	None	Ajay Bhatt	Bharatiya Janata Party	18th Lok Sabha	2024
4	Nainital–Udhamsingh Nagar	None		58	Nainital	SC	Ajay Bhatt	Bharatiya Janata Party	18th Lok Sabha	2024
4	Nainital–Udhamsingh Nagar	None		59	Haldwani	None	Ajay Bhatt	Bharatiya Janata Party	18th Lok Sabha	2024
4	Nainital–Udhamsingh Nagar	None		60	Kaladhungi	None	Ajay Bhatt	Bharatiya Janata Party	18th Lok Sabha	2024
4	Nainital–Udhamsingh Nagar	None		62	Jaspur	None	Ajay Bhatt	Bharatiya Janata Party	18th Lok Sabha	2024
4	Nainital–Udhamsingh Nagar	None		63	Kashipur	None	Ajay Bhatt	Bharatiya Janata Party	18th Lok Sabha	2024
4	Nainital–Udhamsingh Nagar	None		64	Bajpur	SC	Ajay Bhatt	Bharatiya Janata Party	18th Lok Sabha	2024
4	Nainital–Udhamsingh Nagar	None		65	Gadarpur	None	Ajay Bhatt	Bharatiya Janata Party	18th Lok Sabha	2024
4	Nainital–Udhamsingh Nagar	None		66	Rudrapur	None	Ajay Bhatt	Bharatiya Janata Party	18th Lok Sabha	2024
4	Nainital–Udhamsingh Nagar	None		67	Kichha	None	Ajay Bhatt	Bharatiya Janata Party	18th Lok Sabha	2024
4	Nainital–Udhamsingh Nagar	None		68	Sitarganj	None	Ajay Bhatt	Bharatiya Janata Party	18th Lok Sabha	2024
4	Nainital–Udhamsingh Nagar	None		69	Nanakmatta	ST	Ajay Bhatt	Bharatiya Janata Party	18th Lok Sabha	2024
4	Nainital–Udhamsingh Nagar	None		70	Khatima	None	Ajay Bhatt	Bharatiya Janata Party	18th Lok Sabha	2024
5	Haridwar	None		18	Dharampur	None	Trivendra Singh Rawat	Bharatiya Janata Party	18th Lok Sabha	2024
5	Haridwar	None		23	Doiwala	None	Trivendra Singh Rawat	Bharatiya Janata Party	18th Lok Sabha	2024
5	Haridwar	None		24	Rishikesh	None	Trivendra Singh Rawat	Bharatiya Janata Party	18th Lok Sabha	2024
5	Haridwar	None		25	Haridwar	None	Trivendra Singh Rawat	Bharatiya Janata Party	18th Lok Sabha	2024
5	Haridwar	None		26	BHEL Ranipur	None	Trivendra Singh Rawat	Bharatiya Janata Party	18th Lok Sabha	2024
5	Haridwar	None		27	Jwalapur	SC	Trivendra Singh Rawat	Bharatiya Janata Party	18th Lok Sabha	2024
5	Haridwar	None		28	Bhagwanpur	SC	Trivendra Singh Rawat	Bharatiya Janata Party	18th Lok Sabha	2024
5	Haridwar	None		29	Jhabrera	SC	Trivendra Singh Rawat	Bharatiya Janata Party	18th Lok Sabha	2024
5	Haridwar	None		30	Piran Kaliyar	None	Trivendra Singh Rawat	Bharatiya Janata Party	18th Lok Sabha	2024
5	Haridwar	None		31	Roorkee	None	Trivendra Singh Rawat	Bharatiya Janata Party	18th Lok Sabha	2024
5	Haridwar	None		32	Khanpur	None	Trivendra Singh Rawat	Bharatiya Janata Party	18th Lok Sabha	2024
5	Haridwar	None		33	Manglaur	None	Trivendra Singh Rawat	Bharatiya Janata Party	18th Lok Sabha	2024
5	Haridwar	None		34	Laksar	None	Trivendra Singh Rawat	Bharatiya Janata Party	18th Lok Sabha	2024
5	Haridwar	None		35	Haridwar Rural	None	Trivendra Singh Rawat	Bharatiya Janata Party	18th Lok Sabha	2024

=== Former constituency ===
- Nainital (2000–2009)

== Rajya Sabha ==
The Rajya Sabha (meaning "Council of States") is the upper house of the Parliament of India. Uttarakhand state elects three members and they are indirectly elected by the members of Uttarakhand Legislative Assembly. Members are elected for six years and one-third of members are retired after every two years. Elections within the state legislatures are held using single transferable voting with proportional representation.

=== Current members ===
Keys: BJP (3)
Source: Parliament of India (Rajya Sabha)

No.	Current member	Party	Date of appointment	Date of retirement	Election
1	Naresh Bansal	Bharatiya Janata Party	26 November 2020	25 November 2026	2020
2	Kalpana Saini	Bharatiya Janata Party	5 July 2022	4 July 2028	2022
3	Mahendra Bhatt	Bharatiya Janata Party	3 April 2024	2 April 2030	2024

== See also ==
- List of constituencies of the Uttarakhand Legislative Assembly
- List of Lok Sabha members from Uttarakhand
- List of Rajya Sabha members from Uttarakhand
