= Balwant Singh Bhauryal =

Indian politician

Balwant Singh Bhauryal (born 15 August 1960) is an Indian politician belonging to the Bharatiya Janata Party. He is a second time member of the 4th Uttarakhand legislative assembly (2017–2022) elected from Kapkot constituency of Bageshwar district. Bhauryal was also a member of the 2nd Uttarakhand Legislative assembly. elected from Kanda Assembly constituency, Bageshwar, Uttarakhand Legislative Assembly in India & State chief electoral officer.

He was elected from Kanda (Vidhan Sabha constituency) in the 2002 to 2007. He has served as Cabinet Minister of Uttarakhand from 2009 to 2012. He was also given the charge of the Minister for Health, Secretariat Administration and Medical Education along with Information Technology. Bhauryal also became the Guardian minister for Nanital district.

== Early political career ==
Balwant Singh Bhauryal made his foray into politics in 1975 when he was elected as member of Gram Panchayat and then district general Secretary in year 1997.

Thereafter, he was elected Zilla Panchayat President of Bageshwar district of Uttarakhand from 1998 to 2002. Bhauryal has been President of the Bharatiya Janata Party (BJP) Bageshwar District, department coordinator, and State coordinator of Bharatiya Janata Party from 2003 to 2007.

From 2012 to 2015 he was given charge of District in-charge of Pithoragarh District. In 2015 Bhauryal became head of BJP Sadasyata Abhiyan Pramukh of Uttarakhand State.
