= 2007 Uttarakhand Legislative Assembly election =

Legislative Assembly election in Uttarakhand, India

- 21 February 2007

70 seats in the Uttarakhand Legislative Assembly 36 seats needed for a majority
- Turnout: 59.45% (▲5.11%)
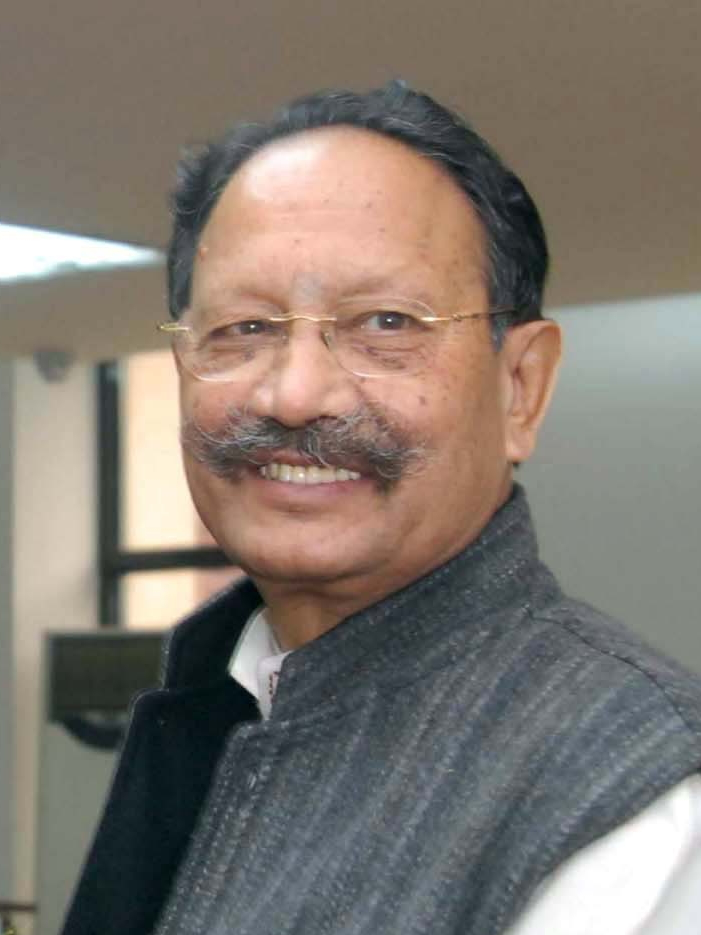

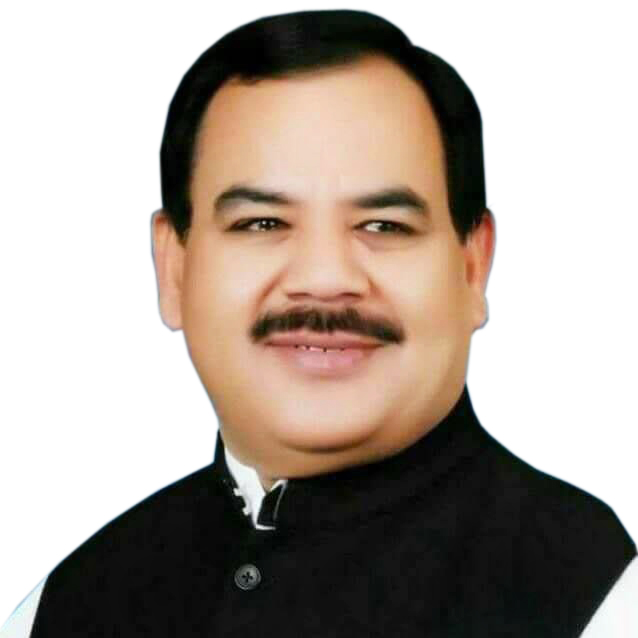
	Majority party	Minority party	Third party
			BSP
Leader	Bhuwan Chandra Khanduri	Harak Singh Rawat	Narayan Pal
Party	BJP	INC	BSP
Alliance	Post-poll alliance with UKD and Independents
Leader since	2007	2007	2002
Leader's seat	Dhumakot (by-election)	Lansdowne	Sitarganj
Last election	19	36	7
Seats won	35	21	8
Seat change	▲16	▼15	▲1
Popular vote	12,03,726	7,69,991	3,12,842
Percentage	31.90%	29.59%	11.76%
Swing	▲6.45%	▲2.68%	▲0.83%
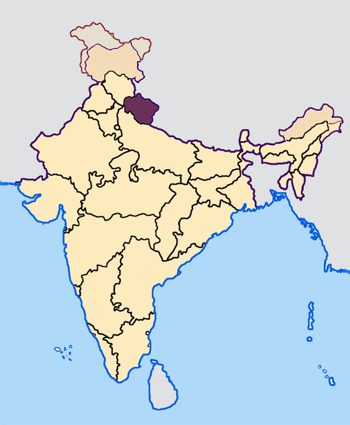
- Uttarakhand
Chief Minister before election
Narayan Datt Tiwari
INC
Elected Chief Minister
Bhuwan Chandra Khanduri
BJP

The 2007 Uttarakhand Legislative Assembly election were the 2nd Vidhan Sabha (Legislative Assembly) election of the state of Uttarakhand in India. The elections were held on 21 February 2007, when the Bharatiya Janata Party emerged as the largest party with 35 seats in the 70-seat legislature. One seat short of forming a majority, the BJP have had to rely on support from the Uttarakhand Kranti Dal and three Independents to form the government. The Indian National Congress became the official opposition, holding 21 seats.

This was the first assembly election in Uttarakhand in which a party could not win a majority. This would be the first time that the Uttarakhand Kranti Dal would be in a coalition government. It was the only Uttarakhand state election where a sitting chief minister did not contest or lose his seat because incumbent Narayan Datt Tiwari chose to step down after the election.

== Parties and alliances ==
Party	Flag	Symbol	Leader	Seats contested
Bharatiya Janata Party			B. C. Khanduri	70
Indian National Congress			Harak Singh Rawat	70
Bahujan Samaj Party			Mayawati	70
Uttarakhand Kranti Dal			Diwakar Bhatt	61
Samajwadi Party				55
Nationalist Congress Party				26
Bharatiya Janshakti Party				38
Rashtriya Lok Dal				14
Communist Party of India (Marxist)				6
Communist Party of India				3
Independent Candidates				240
Total Number of Candidates				785

== Results ==
Rank	Party	Seats Contested	Seats Won	Leader in the House
1	Bharatiya Janata Party (BJP)	70	35	Bhuwan Chandra Khanduri (2007–2009); Ramesh Pokhriyal 'Nihsank' (2009–2011); Bhuwan Chandra Khanduri (2011–2012)
4	Uttarakhand Kranti Dal (UKD)	61	03	Diwakar Bhatt
5	Independents	–	03	N/A
2	Indian National Congress (INC)	70	21	Harak Singh Rawat
3	Bahujan Samaj Party (BSP)	70	08	Narayan Pal
	Total	–	70	

The Bharatiya Janata Party emerged as the largest party with 35 seats in a house of 70. They were still one short of the majority to form a government. After much wrangling it was announced that the Uttarakhand Kranti Dal and the three Independents would be supporting the government. The incumbent Indian National Congress Government lost as they had only 21 seats out of 70 seats.

After protracted discussions it was announced the B. C. Khanduri would be Chief Minister and B. S. Koshyari was to manage party work.

== List of elected Assembly members ==
Constituency		Winner				Runner-up				Margin	%
#	Name	Candidate	Party	Votes	%	Candidate	Party	Votes	%	Margin	%
1	Purola (SC)	Rajesh Juwantha	INC	15,467	37.18	Mal Chand	IND	14,942	35.92	525	1.26
2	Gangotri	Gopal Singh Rawat	BJP	24,250	47.63	Vijaypal Singh Sajwan	INC	18,704	36.74	5,546	10.89
3	Yamunotri	Kedar Singh Rawat	INC	14,484	31.37	Pritam Singh Panwar	UKD	11,156	24.16	3,328	7.21
4	Pratapnagar	Vijay Singh Panwar	BJP	12,587	35.71	Phool Singh	INC	9,943	28.21	2,644	7.50
5	Tehri	Kishore Upadhyaya	INC	15,755	35.31	Khem Singh Chauhan	BJP	12,557	28.14	3,198	7.17
6	Ghansali	Balbeer Singh Negi	INC	12,424	28.97	Abbal Singh Bist	NCP	11,058	25.79	1,366	3.18
7	Deoprayag	Diwakar Bhatt	UKD	20,980	51.03	Mantri Prasad Naithani	INC	9,385	22.83	11,595	28.20
8	Narendranagar	Om Gopal	UKD	13,729	28.91	Subodh Uniyal	INC	13,725	28.90	4	0.01
9	Dhanolti (SC)	Khajan Dass	BJP	19,328	49.61	Kaul Dass	INC	12,800	32.85	6,528	16.76
10	Chakrata (ST)	Pritam Singh	INC	22,504	49.55	Madhu Chauhan	IND	18,763	41.31	3,741	8.24
11	Vikasnagar	Munna Singh Chauhan	BJP	29,297	40.37	Nav Prabhat	INC	24,141	33.27	5,156	7.10
12	Sahaspur (SC)	Rajkumar	BJP	21,390	31.15	Sadhu Ram	INC	16,490	24.01	4,900	7.14
13	Laxman Chowk	Dinesh Agrawal	INC	32,649	46.00	Nityanand Swami	BJP	29,390	41.41	3,259	4.59
14	Dehradun	Harbans Kapoor	BJP	23,856	50.61	Lalchand Sharma	INC	16,823	35.69	7,033	14.92
15	Rajpur	Ganesh Joshi	BJP	24,446	38.82	Hira Singh Bisht	INC	20,876	33.15	3,570	5.67
16	Mussoorie	Jot Singh Gunsola	INC	11,770	31.15	Sahdev Singh Pundir	BJP	10,632	28.14	1,138	3.01
17	Rishikesh	Premchand Aggarwal	BJP	30,491	35.42	Shoorveer Singh Sajwan	INC	21,414	24.87	9,077	10.55
18	Doiwala	Trivendra Singh Rawat	BJP	37,629	39.24	Virendra Mohan Uniyal	INC	23,502	24.51	14,127	14.73
19	Bhagwanpur (SC)	Surendra Rakesh	BSP	27,776	39.36	Chandra Shekhar	BJP	23,643	33.50	4,133	5.86
20	Roorkee	Suresh Chand Jain	BJP	27,136	41.82	Furqan Ahmad	INC	20,855	32.14	6,281	9.68
21	Iqbalpur	Yashveer Singh	BSP	29,193	40.98	Muneer Alam	SP	15,296	21.47	13,897	19.51
22	Manglor	Muhammad Nizamuddin	BSP	25,559	36.91	Chaudhry Kulveer Singh	RLD	22,166	32.01	3,393	4.90
23	Landhaura (SC)	Hari Das	BSP	21,891	30.93	Ami Lal Singh	BJP	15,387	21.74	6,504	9.19
24	Laksar	Pranav Singh	INC	27,038	37.03	Pal Singh Kashyap	BSP	21,380	29.28	5,658	7.75
25	Bahadrabad	Muhammad Shahzad	BSP	28,759	33.86	Prithvi Singh	BJP	18,413	21.68	10,346	12.18
26	Hardwar	Madan Kaushik	BJP	45,093	49.85	Ambrish Kumar	SP	16,453	18.19	28,640	31.66
27	Laldhang	Taslim Ahmad	BSP	19,988	24.04	Sanjay Gupta	BJP	17,329	20.84	2,659	3.20
28	Yamakeshwar	Vijaya Barthwal	BJP	11,172	37.31	Renu Bisht	INC	8,331	27.82	2,841	9.49
29	Kotdwar	Shailendra Singh Rawat	BJP	26,903	46.17	Surendra Singh Negi	INC	26,003	44.63	900	1.54
30	Dhumakot	Tejpal Singh Rawat	INC	14,319	45.41	Khushal Mani	BJP	12,803	40.60	1,516	4.81
31	Bironkhal	Amrita Rawat	INC	15,179	49.51	Deepti Rawat	BJP	11,424	37.27	3,755	12.24
32	Lansdowne	Harak Singh Rawat	INC	12,899	41.97	Bharat Singh Rawat	BJP	9,081	29.55	3,818	12.42
33	Pauri	Yashpal Benam	IND	10,936	31.36	Tirath Singh Rawat	BJP	10,925	31.33	11	0.03
34	Srinagar (SC)	Brijmohan Kotwal	BJP	13,551	42.71	Sundar Lal Mandrawal	INC	10,399	32.78	3,152	9.93
35	Thalisain	Ramesh Pokhriyal	BJP	19,582	46.95	Ganesh Godiyal	INC	17,779	42.63	1,803	4.32
36	Rudraprayag	Matbar Singh Kandari	BJP	16,394	34.01	Virendra Singh Butola	INC	9,374	19.45	7,020	14.56
37	Kedarnath	Asha Nautiyal	BJP	16,971	33.01	Kunwar Singh Negi	INC	13,992	27.21	2,979	5.80
38	Badrinath	Kedar Singh Phonia	BJP	16,607	41.87	Anusuya Prasad Maikhuri	INC	12,742	32.13	3,865	9.74
39	Nandprayag	Rajendra Singh Bhandari	IND	9,849	24.29	Mahendra Bhatt	BJP	8,059	19.87	1,790	4.42
40	Karanprayag	Anil Nautiyal	BJP	15,716	36.08	Prithvipal	INC	8,565	19.66	7,151	16.42
41	Pindar (SC)	Govind Lal	BJP	11,695	32.06	Bhupal Ram Tamta	INC	8,562	23.47	3,133	8.59
42	Kapkot	Bhagat Singh Koshyari	BJP	21,255	57.66	Pratap Singh	INC	11,739	31.85	9,516	25.81
43	Kanda	Balwant Singh Bhauryal	BJP	14,324	39.73	Umed Singh	INC	12,221	33.89	2,103	5.84
44	Bageshwar (SC)	Chandan Ram Das	BJP	17,614	42.75	Ram Parsad	INC	11,724	28.46	5,890	14.29
45	Dwarahat	Pushpesh Tripathi	UKD	11,128	28.55	Sadanand	BJP	8,573	21.99	2,555	6.56
46	Bhikiasain	Surendra Singh Jeena	BJP	13,615	44.54	Pratap Bisht	INC	9,485	31.03	4,130	13.51
47	Salt	Ranjeet Singh	INC	15,190	43.64	Dinesh Singh	IND	8,075	23.20	7,115	20.44
48	Ranikhet	Karan Mahara	INC	13,503	36.83	Ajay Bhatt	BJP	13,298	36.27	205	0.56
49	Someshwar (SC)	Ajay Tamta	BJP	15,985	46.00	Pradeep Tamta	INC	14,472	41.64	1,513	4.36
50	Almora	Manoj Tewari	INC	22,223	46.86	Kailash Sharma	BJP	19,243	40.58	2,980	6.28
51	Jageshwar	Govind Singh Kunjwal	INC	18,154	45.31	Raghunath Singh Chauhan	BJP	17,027	42.50	1,127	2.81
52	Mukteshwar (SC)	Yashpal Arya	INC	26,801	58.24	Shri Chand	BJP	15,817	34.37	10,984	23.87
53	Dhari	Govind Singh Bisht	BJP	40,996	49.37	Harish Chandra Durgapal	INC	30,235	36.41	10,761	12.96
54	Haldwani	Banshi Dhar Bhagat	BJP	39,248	35.98	Indira Hridayesh	INC	35,013	32.10	4,235	3.88
55	Nainital	Kharak Singh Bohara	BJP	12,347	24.45	Narayan Singh Jantwal	UKD	11,980	23.73	367	0.72
56	Ramnagar	Diwan Singh Bisht	BJP	25,949	38.17	Yogambar Singh Rawat	INC	14,873	21.88	11,076	16.29
57	Jaspur	Shailendra Mohan Singhal	INC	25,063	34.23	Mohd. Umar	IND	13,368	18.26	11,695	15.97
58	Kashipur	Harbhajan Singh Cheema	BJP	31,756	33.66	Mohd. Zubair	SP	16,295	17.27	15,461	16.39
59	Pantnagar-Gadarpur	Premanand Mahajan	BSP	28,770	31.42	Rajendra Pal Singh	INC	20,483	22.37	8,287	9.05
60	Rudrapur-Kichha	Tilak Raj Behar	INC	46,800	40.31	Rajesh Shukla	BJP	40,568	34.94	6,232	5.37
61	Sitarganj (SC)	Narayan Pal	BSP	31,745	39.29	Kanta Prasad Sagar	INC	23,308	28.85	8,437	10.44
62	Khatima (ST)	Gopal Singh Rana	INC	36,561	41.12	Gopal Singh Harlal	BJP	17,637	19.84	18,924	21.28
63	Champawat	Veena Maharana	BJP	22,928	41.90	Hemesh Kharkwal	INC	15,870	29.00	7,058	12.90
64	Lohaghat	Mahendra Singh Mahra	INC	15,433	36.21	Krishna Chandra Punetha	BJP	13,823	32.43	1,610	3.78
65	Pithoragarh	Prakash Pant	BJP	26,855	50.86	Ravindra Singh Kiran	INC	20,865	39.52	5,990	11.34
66	Gangolihat (SC)	Joga Ram Tamta	BJP	14,755	42.45	Narayan Ram Arya	INC	11,965	34.42	2,790	8.03
67	Didihat	Bishan Singh Chuphal	BJP	12,512	31.17	Hem Pant	INC	10,218	25.46	2,294	5.71
68	Kanalichhina	Mayukh Singh Mahar	INC	12,911	42.21	Kashi Singh Airy	UKD	8,438	27.59	4,473	14.62
69	Dharchula (ST)	Gagan Singh	IND	13,308	38.37	Kundan Singh	BJP	7,995	23.05	5,313	15.32

== See also ==
- 2nd Uttarakhand Assembly
- First Khanduri ministry
- Pokhriyal ministry
- Second Khanduri ministry
- Elections in Uttarakhand
- Politics of Uttarakhand
- 2007 elections in India
