= Dhari, Uttarakhand Assembly constituency =

Former constituency of the Uttarakhand Legislative Assembly, in India

Coordinates: 29.51°N 79.46°E

Dhari
- Former constituency for the Uttarakhand Legislative Assembly

Constituency details
- Country: India
- Region: North India
- State: Uttarakhand
- District: Nainital
- Established: 2002
- Abolished: 2012

Dhari Legislative Assembly constituency was one of the seventy electoral Uttarakhand Legislative Assembly constituencies of Uttarakhand state in India. It was abolished in 2012 following the delimitation.

Dhari Legislative Assembly constituency was a part of Nainital–Udhamsingh Nagar (Lok Sabha constituency).

== Members of Legislative Assembly ==
Election	Member	Party
2002	Harish Chandra Durgapal	Indian National Congress
2007	Govind Singh Bisht	Bharatiya Janata Party

== Election results ==
=== Assembly Election 2007 ===
2007 Uttarakhand Legislative Assembly election: Dhari, Uttarakhand
Party	Candidate	Votes	%	±%
BJP	Govind Singh Bisht	40,996	49.37%	▲13.04
INC	Harish Chandra Durgapal	30,235	36.41%	▼0.94
BSP	Prithivi Pal Singh Rawat	4,336	5.22%	▼5.87
SP	Umesh Sharma	1,459	1.76%	▲0.33
Independent	Virendra Puri Maharaj	1,169	1.41%	New
UKD	Basant Joshi	1,137	1.37%	▼0.18
Independent	Prakash Joshi Uttarakhandi	1,118	1.35%	New
RLD	Chandra Shekhar	887	1.07%	New
CPI(ML)L	Bahadur Singh Jangi	726	0.87%	▼1.42
IJP	Harish Chandra Arya	628	0.76%	New
Margin of victory		10,761	12.96%	▲11.94
Turnout		83,034	67.61%	▲13.73
Registered electors		1,22,988		▲23.47
BJP gain from INC		Swing	▲12.01	

=== Assembly Election 2002 ===
2002 Uttaranchal Legislative Assembly election: Dhari, Uttarakhand
Party	Candidate	Votes	%	±%
INC	Harish Chandra Durgapal	20,014	37.36%	New
BJP	Govind Singh Bisht	19,465	36.33%	New
BSP	Lalit Pant	5,943	11.09%	New
Independent	Virendra Puri	1,340	2.50%	New
CPI(ML)L	Bahadur Singh Jangi	1,231	2.30%	New
Independent	Pratap Singh Negi	1,032	1.93%	New
UKD	Laxman Singh	832	1.55%	New
SP	Suresh Singh Parihar	767	1.43%	New
Independent	Madan Singh	707	1.32%	New
JP	Zaheer Ahamad	539	1.01%	New
Independent	Devki Sharma	452	0.84%	New
Margin of victory		549	1.02%	
Turnout		53,574	53.78%	
Registered electors		99,611		
INC win (new seat)				
