= Jot Singh Gunsola =

Indian politician

President Cricket Association of Uttarakhand
- In office 14 September 2019 – 1 September 2025
- Preceded by: Hira Singh Bisht
- Succeeded by: Deepak Mehra

Member of Legislative Assembly for Mussoorie
- In office 2002–2012

Chairman Mussoorie Municipal Council
- In office 1997–2002
- In office 1988–1994

Personal details
- Party: Indian National Congress

Jot Singh Gunsola is an Indian politician from Uttarakhand and a two term Member of the Uttarakhand Legislative Assembly. Gunsola represented the Mussoorie (Uttarakhand Assembly constituency). He twice served as the Chairman of Mussoorie Municipal Council. Gunsola is a member of the Indian National Congress.

== Positions held ==
Year	Description
1988 - 1994	Chairman - Mussoorie Municipal Council
1997 - 2002	Chairman - Mussoorie Municipal Council (2nd term)
2002 - 2007	Elected to 1st Uttarakhand Assembly from Mussoorie: Member - Committee on Estimates (2003–04); Member - Committee on Assembly Rules (2004–07); Member - Committee on PSE and Corporate (2004–07); Member - Committee on Estimates (2007–08)
2007 - 2012	Elected to 2nd Uttarakhand Assembly from Mussoorie (2nd term): Member - Committee on Petition (2008–10); Member - Committee on Subordinate Legislation (2008–10)
