= 2002 Uttaranchal Legislative Assembly election =

Indian state election

- 14 February 2002

70 seats in the Uttaranchal Legislative Assembly 36 seats needed for a majority
- Turnout: 54.34%
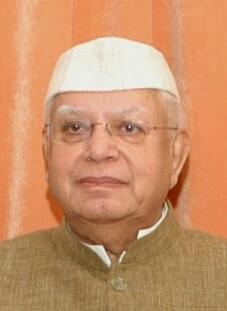

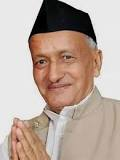

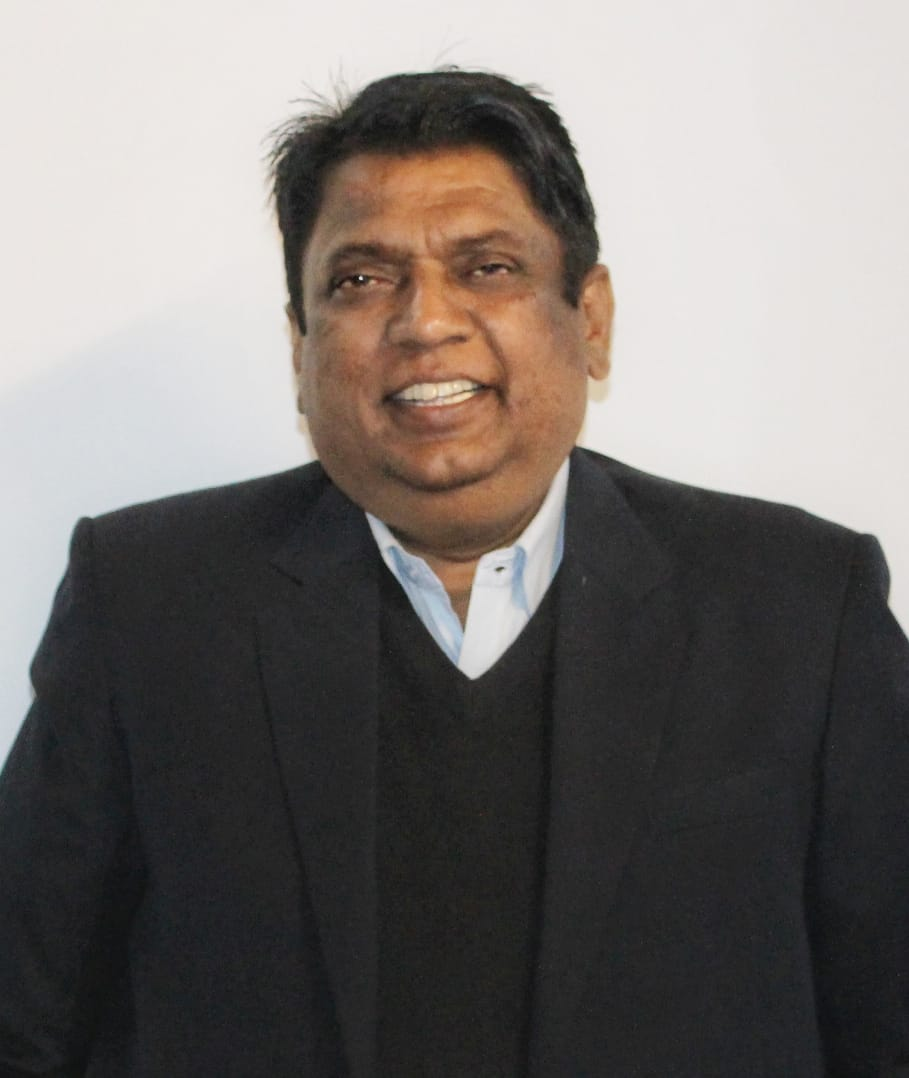
	Majority party	Minority party	Third party
Leader	Narayan Datt Tiwari	Bhagat Singh Koshyari	Narayan Pal
Party	INC	BJP	BSP
Leader since	2002	2001	2002
Leader's seat	Ramnagar (by-election)	Kapkot	Sitarganj
Seats won	36	19	7
Popular vote	7,69,991	7,28,134	3,12,842
Percentage	26.91%	25.45%	10.93%
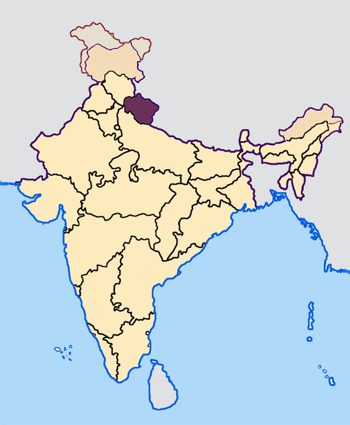
- Uttaranchal
Chief Minister before election
Bhagat Singh Koshyari
BJP
Elected Chief Minister
Narayan Datt Tiwari
INC

The 2002 Uttaranchal Legislative Assembly election were the 1st Vidhan Sabha (Legislative Assembly) elections of the state of Uttaranchal in India, when the Indian National Congress emerged as the largest party and won a majority with 36 seats in the 70-seat legislature in the election. The Bharatiya Janata Party became the official opposition, holding 19 seats.

This was the first time state assembly elections were held in Uttarakhand. It was the only Uttarakhand state election where the sitting chief minister did not lose his seat. This was also the only time the Nationalist Congress Party would win a seat in Uttarakhand. This would be the last time until 2017 that a party would secure a majority of seats and the only time the Indian National Congress managed to do so.

== Interim Uttaranchal Legislative Assembly (2000-2002) ==
Party	Symbol	Seats
Bharatiya Janata Party		23
Samajwadi Party		3
Bahujan Samaj Party		2
Indian National Congress		2

== Parties and alliances ==
Party	Flag	Symbol	Leader	Seats contested
Indian National Congress			N. D. Tiwari	70
Bharatiya Janata Party			Bhagat Singh Koshyari	69
Bahujan Samaj Party			Mayawati	68
Uttarakhand Kranti Dal			Kashi Singh Airy	62
Nationalist Congress Party			Sharad Pawar	26

== Results ==
2002 Uttaranchal Legislative Assembly election result (vote percentage)
INC	26.91%
BJP	25.45%
BSP	10.93%
SP	6.27%
UKD	5.49%
NCP	1.50%
Others	23.45%

Party Name	Popular vote			Seats		
Party Name	Votes	%	% (Note: Vote Percentage in Contested seats)	Contested	Won	FD
Indian National Congress	769,991	26.91	26.91	70	36	10
Bharatiya Janata Party	728,134	25.45	25.81	69	19	12
Bahujan Samaj Party	312,842	10.93	11.20	68	7	55
Samajwadi Party	179,543	6.27	6.79	63	0	57
Uttarakhand Kranti Dal	157,021	5.49	6.36	62	4	54
Uttarakhand Janwadi Party	69,341	2.42	3.90	44	0	42
Nationalist Congress Party	43,041	1.50	4.02	26	1	24
Communist Party of India	24,111	0.84	4.00	14	0	13
Lok Janshakti Party	23,763	0.83	1.58	31	0	31
Rashtriya Lok Dal	18,829	0.66	1.83	24	0	24
Samata Party	16,703	0.58	1.44	26	0	26
Shiv Sena	9,718	0.34	1.49	13	0	13
Independents	466,555	16.30	16.63	346	3	333
Others	41,601	1.45	—N/a	135	0	135
Grand Total	2,861,492	100.00		927	70	765

== List of elected Assembly members ==
Constituency		Winner				Runner Up				Margin	%
#	Name	Candidate	Party	Votes	%	Candidate	Party	Votes	%	Margin	%
1	Purola (SC)	Mal Chand	BJP	13,209	40.79	Shanti Devi Juwantha	INC	10,238	31.62	2,971	9.17
2	Gangotri	Vijaypal Singh Sajwan	INC	7,878	20.91	Kamala Ram Nautiyal	CPI	7,268	19.29	610	1.62
3	Yamunotri	Pritam Singh Panwar	UKD	9,498	26.37	Kedar Singh Rawat	INC	7,013	19.47	2,485	6.90
4	Pratapnagar	Phool Singh Bist	INC	10,517	30.83	Vijay Singh Panwar	IND	9,128	26.76	1,389	4.07
5	Tehri	Kishor Upadhyay	INC	15,640	41.95	Er. Ratan Singh Gunsola	BJP	11,712	31.41	3,928	10.54
6	Ghansali	Balvir Singh Negi	NCP	11,072	25.92	Abbal Singh Bist	INC	7,340	17.18	3,732	8.74
7	Devprayag	Mantri Prasad Naithani	INC	9,912	30.16	Raghuveer Singh Panwar	BJP	7,660	23.31	2,252	6.85
8	Narendranagar	Subodh Uniyal	INC	9,798	28.84	Lakhi Ram	BJP	8,267	24.34	1,531	4.50
9	Dhanolti (SC)	Kaul Das	INC	10,612	32.68	Khajan Dass	BJP	8,687	26.75	1,925	5.93
10	Chakrata (ST)	Pritam Singh	INC	18,468	49.59	Munna Singh Chauhan	UJP	10,292	27.64	8,176	21.95
11	Vikasnagar	Nav Prabhat	INC	8,971	16.93	Munna Singh Chauhan	UJP	8,913	16.82	58	0.11
12	Sahaspur (SC)	Sadhu Ram	INC	15,588	35.67	Pradeep	BJP	10,392	23.78	5,196	11.89
13	Laxman Chowk	Dinesh Agrawal	INC	14,803	35.11	Nityanand Swami	BJP	14,000	33.21	803	1.90
14	Dehradun	Harbans Kapoor	BJP	13,977	41.11	Sanjay Sharma	INC	11,053	32.51	2,924	8.60
15	Rajpur	Hira Singh Bist	INC	14,061	34.98	Khushal Singh Ranavat	BJP	11,282	28.07	2,779	6.91
16	Mussoorie	Jot Singh	INC	14,384	52.30	Narayan Singh	BJP	8,041	29.23	6,343	23.07
17	Rishikesh	Shoor Beer Singh	INC	14,898	25.28	Sandeep Gupta	BJP	14,057	23.86	841	1.42
18	Doiwala	Trivendra Singh Rawat	BJP	18,926	31.49	Virendra Mohan Uniyal	INC	17,390	28.94	1,536	2.55
19	Bhagwanpur (SC)	Chandrasekher	BJP	15,875	28.61	Surendra Rakesh	IND	12,527	22.58	3,348	6.03
20	Roorkee	Suresh Chand	BJP	16,338	34.19	Manohar Lal Sharma	INC	12,587	26.34	3,751	7.85
21	Iqbalpur	Ch. Yashveer Singh	BSP	21,462	34.39	Muneer Alam	SP	10,797	17.30	10,665	17.09
22	Manglaur	Nizamuddin	BSP	21,155	39.94	Sarvat Karim	INC	14,561	27.49	6,594	12.45
23	Landhaura (SC)	Hari Das	BSP	15,758	30.12	Rajendra Kumar	SP	13,814	26.41	1,944	3.71
24	Laksar	Pranav Singh	IND	14,903	24.86	Qazi Mohammad Mohiuddin	BSP	12,996	21.68	1,907	3.18
25	Bahadrabad	Muhammad Shahzad	BSP	18,159	29.66	Dr. Prithvi Singh Viksit	BJP	17,125	27.97	1,034	1.69
26	Hardwar	Madan Kaushik	BJP	18,962	31.26	Paras Kumar Jain	INC	15,970	26.33	2,992	4.93
27	Laldhang	Tasleem Ahmad	BSP	17,218	27.52	Balwant Singh Chauhan	BJP	14,362	22.95	2,856	4.57
28	Yamkeshwar	Vijay Barthwal	BJP	7,404	26.44	Sarojani Kaintura	INC	5,957	21.27	1,447	5.17
29	Kotdwar	Surendra Singh Negi	INC	20,087	49.57	Bhuw nesh Kharkwal	IND	9,250	22.83	10,837	26.74
30	Dhumakot	Tejpal Singh Rawat	INC	8,830	33.65	Khushal Mani Ghildiyal	BJP	7,818	29.79	1,012	3.86
31	Bironkhal	Amrita Rawat	INC	14,188	53.08	Kalpeshwari Devi	BJP	6,444	24.11	7,744	28.97
32	Lansdowne	Dr. Harak Singh Rawat	INC	8,914	34.45	Bharat Singh Rawat	BJP	8,446	32.64	468	1.81
33	Pauri	Narendra Singh Bhandri	INC	11,996	40.97	Teerath Singh	BJP	9,091	31.05	2,905	9.92
34	Srinagar (SC)	Sunderlal Mandrawal	INC	10,040	40.51	Brij Mohan	BJP	8,403	33.90	1,637	6.61
35	Thalisain	Ganesh Prasad Godiyal	INC	14,764	43.56	Dr. Ramesh Pokhriyal 'Nishank'	BJP	13,767	40.62	997	2.94
36	Rudraprayag	Matbar Singh	BJP	15,031	37.65	Gajendra Singh	INC	9,275	23.23	5,756	14.42
37	Kedarnath	Asha Devi	BJP	13,080	30.14	Shaila Rani Rawat	INC	9,615	22.16	3,465	7.98
38	Badrinath	Dr. Ansuya Prasad Maikhuri	INC	11,145	34.81	Kedar Singh Fonia	BJP	10,154	31.72	991	3.09
39	Nandprayag	Mahendra Bhatt	BJP	6,790	20.71	Satendra Bartwal	INC	5,159	15.74	1,631	4.97
40	Karanprayag	Anil Nautiyal	BJP	9,224	26.94	Surendra Singh	NCP	7,584	22.15	1,640	4.79
41	Pindar (SC)	Govind Lal	BJP	10,647	36.75	Prem Lal Bharti	INC	8,849	30.55	1,798	6.20
42	Kapkot	Bhagat Singh Koshyari	BJP	17,617	57.40	Chamu Singh Gasyal	INC	9,103	29.66	8,514	27.74
43	Kanda	Ummed Singh Majila	INC	8,535	29.07	Balwant Singh Bhauryal	BJP	7,503	25.55	1,032	3.52
44	Bageshwar (SC)	Ram Prasad Tamta	INC	12,419	37.93	Narayan Ram Das	BJP	10,242	31.28	2,177	6.65
45	Dwarahat	Bipin Chandra Tripathi	UKD	11,114	36.99	Puran Chandra	INC	7,112	23.67	4,002	13.32
46	Bhikiasain	Dr. Pratap Bisht	INC	6,759	25.47	Leeladhar	IND	4,549	17.14	2,210	8.33
47	Salt	Ranjeet Singh	INC	11,988	41.57	Mohan Singh S/O Diwan Singh	BJP	8,436	29.25	3,552	12.32
48	Ranikhet	Ajay Bhatt	BJP	10,199	33.75	Pooran Singh	INC	7,897	26.13	2,302	7.62
49	Someshwar (SC)	Pardeep Tamta	INC	9,146	34.39	Rajesh Kumar	BJP	8,263	31.07	883	3.32
50	Almora	Kailash Sharma	BJP	10,224	29.29	Manoj Tewari	INC	8,620	24.70	1,604	4.59
51	Jageshwar	Govind Singh Kunjwal	INC	11,547	36.42	Raghunath Singh Chauhan	BJP	9,225	29.10	2,322	7.32
52	Mukteshwar (SC)	Yashpal Arya	INC	13,531	37.70	Srichand	BJP	12,107	33.74	1,424	3.96
53	Dhari	Harish Chandra Durgapal	INC	20,014	37.36	Govind Singh Bisht	BJP	19,465	36.33	549	1.03
54	Haldwani	Indira Hirdyesh	INC	23,327	38.18	Banshidhar Bhagat	BJP	20,269	33.17	3,058	5.01
55	Nainital	Narayan Singh Jantiwal	UKD	10,864	26.74	Jaya Bisht	INC	8,517	20.97	2,347	5.77
56	Ramnagar	Yogember Singh	INC	16,271	33.06	Diwan Singh Bisht	BJP	11,356	23.08	4,915	9.98
57	Jaspur	Dr. Shailendra Mohan Singhal	IND	13,897	26.07	Adbul Hafij	INC	12,580	23.60	1,317	2.47
58	Kashipur	Harbhajan Singh Cheema	BJP	18,396	30.69	K.C. Singh Baba	INC	18,201	30.37	195	0.32
59	Bajpur	Arvind Pandey	BJP	16,365	32.42	Janak Raj Sharma	IND	11,186	22.16	5,179	10.26
60	Pantnagar-Gadarpur	Premchand Mahajan	BSP	20,594	31.89	Shyam Lal	IND	12,240	18.96	8,354	12.93
61	Rudrapur-Kichha	Tilak Raj Behad	INC	21,614	31.97	Rajesh Kumar	SP	14,576	21.56	7,038	10.41
62	Sitarganj (SC)	Naryan Pal	BSP	20,001	35.93	Beena Arya	BJP	14,339	25.76	5,662	10.17
63	Khatima (ST)	Gopal Singh	INC	22,588	37.92	Dan Singh	BSP	11,844	19.88	10,744	18.04
64	Champawat	Hamesh Kharkwal	INC	8,380	21.55	Madan Singh Mahrana	IND	7,985	20.53	395	1.02
65	Lohaghat	Mahendra Singh Mahra	INC	7,648	22.36	Krishan Chandra Punetha	BJP	7,138	20.87	510	1.49
66	Pithoragarh	Prakash Pant	BJP	16,015	39.15	Mayukh Mahar	INC	9,889	24.18	6,126	14.97
67	Gangolihat (SC)	Narayan Ram Arya	INC	8,898	33.74	Jogaram Tamta	BJP	8,428	31.96	470	1.78
68	Didihat	Bishan Singh Chuphal	BJP	13,104	39.32	Ghanshyam Joshi	UKD	8,609	25.83	4,495	13.49
69	Kanalichhina	Kashi Singh Hairy	UKD	9,378	34.96	Jagjeevan	BJP	6,513	24.28	2,865	10.68
70	Dharchula (ST)	Gagan Singh	IND	12,537	42.52	Pradyuman Singh	INC	4,670	15.84	7,867	26.68

== See also ==
- 1st Uttarakhand Assembly
- Tiwari ministry
- Elections in Uttarakhand
- Politics of Uttarakhand
- 2002 elections in India
