= Rudrapur–Kichha Assembly constituency =

Former constituency of the Uttarakhand Legislative Assembly, in India

Coordinates: 28.94°N 79.45°E

Rudrapur–Kichha
- Former constituency for the Uttarakhand Legislative Assembly

Constituency details
- Country: India
- Region: North India
- State: Uttarakhand
- District: Udham Singh Nagar
- Established: 2002
- Abolished: 2012

Rudrapur–Kichha Legislative Assembly constituency was one of the seventy electoral Uttarakhand Legislative Assembly constituencies of Uttarakhand state in India. It was abolished in 2012 following the delimitation.

Rudrapur–Kichha Legislative Assembly constituency was a part of Nainital–Udhamsingh Nagar (Lok Sabha constituency).

== Members of the Legislative Assembly ==
Election	Member	Party
2002	Tilak Raj Behar	Indian National Congress
2007	Tilak Raj Behar	Indian National Congress
Major boundary changes
This Assembly constituency has been bifurcated into Rudrapur and Kichha Assembly constituencies

== Election results ==
=== Assembly Election 2007 ===
2007 Uttarakhand Legislative Assembly election: Rudrapur–Kichha
Party	Candidate	Votes	%	±%
INC	Tilak Raj Behar	46,800	40.31%	▲8.34
BJP	Rajesh Shukla	40,568	34.94%	▲13.46
BSP	Tasawwar Khan	23,126	19.92%	▲11.81
Independent	Vimlesh	1,433	1.23%	New
SP	Nagesh Tripathi	947	0.82%	▼20.75
Independent	Vijay Kumar	833	0.72%	New
RJD	Khalik Beg	594	0.51%	New
Margin of victory		6,232	5.37%	▼5.04
Turnout		1,16,099	73.82%	▲16.27
Registered electors		1,57,292		▲33.90
INC hold		Swing	▲8.34	

=== Assembly Election 2002 ===
2002 Uttaranchal Legislative Assembly election: Rudrapur–Kichha
Party	Candidate	Votes	%	±%
INC	Tilak Raj Behar	21,614	31.97%	New
SP	Rajesh Kumar	14,576	21.56%	New
BJP	Vijay Kumar	14,522	21.48%	New
BSP	Manvendra Singh	5,483	8.11%	New
SAP	Anupam	4,196	6.21%	New
UKD	Sushil Srivastava	2,492	3.69%	New
Independent	Rita	1,540	2.28%	New
Independent	Hans Pandey	1,040	1.54%	New
Independent	R. K. Batra	648	0.96%	New
Independent	Anwar	531	0.79%	New
Margin of victory		7,038	10.41%	
Turnout		67,597	57.54%	
Registered electors		1,17,472		
INC win (new seat)				

== See also ==
- Rudrapur (Uttarakhand Assembly constituency)
- Kichha (Uttarakhand Assembly constituency)
