= Pantnagar–Gadarpur Assembly constituency =

Constituency of the Uttarakhand legislative assembly in India

Coordinates: 29.05°N 79.39°E

Pantnagar–Gadarpur
- Former constituency for the Uttarakhand Legislative Assembly

Constituency details
- Country: India
- Region: North India
- State: Uttarakhand
- District: Udham Singh Nagar
- Established: 2002
- Abolished: 2012

Pantnagar–Gadarpur Legislative Assembly constituency was one of the seventy electoral Uttarakhand Legislative Assembly constituencies of Uttarakhand state in India. It was abolished in 2012 following the delimitation.

Pantnagar–Gadarpur Legislative Assembly constituency was a part of Nainital–Udhamsingh Nagar (Lok Sabha constituency).

== Members of the Legislative Assembly ==
Election	Member	Party
2002	Premanand Mahajan	Bahujan Samaj Party
2007	Premanand Mahajan	Bahujan Samaj Party

== Election results ==
=== Assembly Election 2007 ===
2007 Uttarakhand Legislative Assembly election: Pantnagar–Gadarpur
Party	Candidate	Votes	%	±%
BSP	Premanand Mahajan	28,770	31.42%	▼0.47
INC	Rajendra Pal Singh	20,483	22.37%	▲9.11
BJP	Ravinder Bajaj	19,307	21.09%	▲7.76
SP	Jarnail Singh Kali	11,389	12.44%	▲5.07
UKD	Kamal Kumar Pandey	2,091	2.28%	New
Independent	Chandra Singh	1,848	2.02%	New
RJD	Vivekanand	1,664	1.82%	New
SBSP	Jay Prakash Shah	865	0.94%	New
Independent	Radha Kant Sarkar	750	0.82%	New
SAP	Harendra Aneja	741	0.81%	New
CPI(M)	Suneel Haldar	638	0.70%	New
Margin of victory		8,287	9.05%	▼3.89
Turnout		91,563	76.84%	▲14.02
Registered electors		1,19,254		▲15.91
BSP hold		Swing	▼0.47	

=== Assembly Election 2002 ===
2002 Uttaranchal Legislative Assembly election: Pantnagar–Gadarpur
Party	Candidate	Votes	%	±%
BSP	Premanand Mahajan	20,594	31.89%	New
Independent	Shyam Lal	12,240	18.96%	New
BJP	Sitaram	8,602	13.32%	New
INC	Satyendra Chandra	8,560	13.26%	New
SP	Khalil Beg	4,755	7.36%	New
Independent	Pratap Singh	4,410	6.83%	New
CPI	A. C. Kulsreshtha	1,595	2.47%	New
Independent	Kunwar Singh	726	1.12%	New
Independent	Parwan Ali	626	0.97%	New
SJP(R)	Vivek Shankar	550	0.85%	New
LJP	Kishan Singh	529	0.82%	New
Margin of victory		8,354	12.94%	
Turnout		64,570	62.76%	
Registered electors		1,02,882		
BSP win (new seat)				

== See also ==
- Gadarpur (Uttarakhand Assembly constituency)
