= Harish Chandra Durgapal =

Indian politician

- Born: Dungarpur
- Occupation: Politics

Harish Chandra Durgapal(Hindi: हरीश चंद्र दुर्गापाल) is a popular political leader in Uttarakhand, India. He is former cabinet minister of Labour, Employment, Small Scale Industries, Khadi & Village Industries and Dairy Development in the Indian National Congress Government. He was elected MLA from Lalkuan, Nainital, Uttarakhand, India in the 2012 Assembly election as an independent candidate. He lost in 2017 Assembly election as Congress candidate to BJP's Naveen Chandra Dumka by a margin of 27,108 votes.

== Education ==
Durgapal was educated at U.P. Board Allahabad.

== Political career ==
He won the 2012 Assembly election as an independent candidate from Lalkuan constituency. Before this win, he unsuccessfully contested as candidate for the Indian National Congress from Dhari (Nainital) constituency in the 2007 election losing to Bharatiya Janata Party candidate Govind Singh Bisht.

While addressing a convention in Haridwar in 2012, Durgapal said that industrialization was important for job creation. He is also working for Infrastructure at Khadi board in state.
