= Muhammad Shahzad =

Indian politician

Haji Muhammad Shahzad

Member of the Uttarakhand Legislative Assembly
- Incumbent
- Assumed office 10 March 2022
- Preceded by: Sanjay Gupta, BJP
- Constituency: Laksar
- In office 24 February 2002 – 6 March 2012
- Constituency: Bahadarabad

Personal details
- Party: Bahujan Samaj Party

Haji Muhammad Shahzad is an Indian politician from Uttarakhand and a three term Member of the Uttarakhand Legislative Assembly. Shahzad represented the Bahadarabad Assembly constituency in the 1st Uttarakhand Assembly, 2nd Uttarakhand Assembly and Laksar Assembly constituency in the 5th Uttarakhand legislative Assembly.

== Positions held ==
Year	Description
2002 - 2007	Elected to 1st Uttarakhand Assembly: Member - Committee on Estimate (2002–04); Member - Committee on PSE and Corporate (2002–04); Member - Public Accounts Committee (2004–05); Member - Uttarakhand Waqf Board; Chairman - Committee on Estimate (2005–07)
2007 - 2012	Elected to 2nd Uttarakhand Assembly (2nd term): Member - Committee on Assembly Rules (2007–08); Member - Committee on PSE and Corporate (2007–08); Member - Business Advisory Committee (2008–12); Member - Uttarakhand Waqf Board
2022 - Till date	Elected to 5th Uttarakhand Assembly (3rd term): Member - Uttarakhand State Haj Committee; Member - Uttarakhand Waqf Board
