= Bajpur Assembly constituency =

Legislative assembly constituency in Uttarakhand, India

Coordinates: 29.16°N 79.14°E

Bajpur
- Constituency No. 64 for the Uttarakhand Legislative Assembly

Constituency details
- Country: India
- Region: North India
- State: Uttarakhand
- District: Udham Singh Nagar
- Lok Sabha constituency: Nainital–Udhamsingh Nagar
- Total electors: 151,666
- Reservation: SC

Member of Legislative Assembly
- 5th Uttarakhand Legislative Assembly
- Incumbent Yashpal Arya
- Party: Indian National Congress
- Elected year: 2022

Bajpur is one of the 70 Legislative Assembly constituencies of Uttarakhand state in India.

It is part of Udham Singh Nagar district and is reserved for candidates belonging to the Scheduled castes.

== Members of the Legislative Assembly ==
| Election | Name | Party |
|---|---|---|
| 2002 | Arvind Pandey | Bharatiya Janata Party |
| 2007 | Arvind Pandey | Bharatiya Janata Party |
Major boundary changes
| 2012 | Yashpal Arya | Indian National Congress |
| 2017 | Yashpal Arya | Bharatiya Janata Party |
| 2022 | Yashpal Arya | Indian National Congress |

== Election results ==
=== 2027 Assembly election ===
2027 Uttarakhand Legislative Assembly election: Bajpur
| Party | Candidate | Votes | % | ±% |
|---|---|---|---|---|
| INC | Yashpal Arya | | | |
| BJP | | | | |
| AAP | | | | |
| NOTA | None of the above | | | |
| Majority | | | | |
| Turnout | | | | |
| gain from | | Swing | | |

=== Assembly election 2022 ===
2022 Uttarakhand Legislative Assembly election: Bajpur
| Party | Candidate | Votes | % | ±% |
|---|---|---|---|---|
| INC | Yashpal Arya | 40,252 | 36.76% | ▼3.85 |
| BJP | Rajesh Kumar | 38,641 | 35.29% | ▼17.44 |
| AAP | Sunita Tamta | 20,100 | 18.35% | New |
| BSP | Vijay Pal Singh | 8,848 | 8.08% | ▲3.75 |
| NOTA | None of the above | 706 | 0.64% | ▼0.23 |
| Margin of victory | | 1,611 | 1.47% | ▼10.65 |
| Turnout | | 1,09,508 | 71.96% | ▼4.57 |
| Registered electors | | 1,52,175 | | ▲11.74 |
| INC gain from BJP | | Swing | ▼15.97 | |

=== Assembly election 2017 ===
2017 Uttarakhand Legislative Assembly election: Bajpur
| Party | Candidate | Votes | % | ±% |
|---|---|---|---|---|
| BJP | Yashpal Arya | 54,965 | 52.73% | ▲24.85 |
| INC | Suneeta Tamta | 42,329 | 40.61% | ▼5.31 |
| BSP | Ramavatar | 4,511 | 4.33% | ▼11.17 |
| NOTA | None of the Above | 908 | 0.87% | New |
| SP | Manisha | 651 | 0.62% | ▼0.05 |
| Margin of victory | | 12,636 | 12.12% | ▼5.92 |
| Turnout | | 1,04,237 | 76.54% | ▼0.19 |
| Registered electors | | 1,36,192 | | ▲24.55 |
| BJP gain from INC | | Swing | ▲6.81 | |

=== Assembly election 2012 ===
2012 Uttarakhand Legislative Assembly election: Bajpur
| Party | Candidate | Votes | % | ±% |
|---|---|---|---|---|
| INC | Yashpal Arya | 38,524 | 45.92% | ▲5.63 |
| BJP | Rajesh Kumar | 23,393 | 27.88% | ▼17.46 |
| BSP | Maheelal Gautam | 13,002 | 15.50% | ▲8.44 |
| Independent | Rajkumar | 7,436 | 8.86% | New |
| SP | Gavindra Singh | 567 | 0.68% | ▲0.02 |
| LJP | Anita | 490 | 0.58% | New |
| Independent | Jagdish Singh | 449 | 0.54% | New |
| Margin of victory | | 15,131 | 18.04% | ▲12.99 |
| Turnout | | 83,901 | 76.73% | ▼1.69 |
| Registered electors | | 1,09,343 | | ▲12.61 |
| INC gain from BJP | | Swing | ▲6.49 | |

=== Assembly election 2007 ===
2007 Uttarakhand Legislative Assembly election: Bajpur
| Party | Candidate | Votes | % | ±% |
|---|---|---|---|---|
| BJP | Arvind Pandey | 34,532 | 45.34% | ▲12.92 |
| INC | Kailash Rani | 30,687 | 40.29% | ▲30.73 |
| BSP | Jawinder Singh Gill | 5,381 | 7.06% | ▲3.05 |
| Independent | Baljinder Singh | 940 | 1.23% | New |
| Independent | Khaleek Ahmad | 821 | 1.07% | New |
| Independent | Bhagwan Singh | 637 | 0.83% | New |
| Independent | Gurmeet Singh | 539 | 0.70% | New |
| SP | Kunwarjeet Singh Puniya | 508 | 0.66% | ▼1.97 |
| Margin of victory | | 3,845 | 5.05% | ▼5.21 |
| Turnout | | 76,147 | 78.42% | ▲15.53 |
| Registered electors | | 97,098 | | ▲20.99 |
| BJP hold | | Swing | ▲20.93 | |

=== Assembly election 2002 ===
2002 Uttaranchal Legislative Assembly election: Bajpur
| Party | Candidate | Votes | % | ±% |
|---|---|---|---|---|
| BJP | Arvind Pandey | 16,365 | 32.42% | New |
| Independent | Janak Raj Sharma | 11,186 | 22.16% | New |
| INC | Mohendra Jit Singh | 4,823 | 9.56% | New |
| LJP | Kamran Khan | 4,553 | 9.02% | New |
| Independent | Bhim Singh | 4,248 | 8.42% | New |
| Independent | Jaswinder Singh | 2,315 | 4.59% | New |
| BSP | Rana Bhupender | 2,026 | 4.01% | New |
| SP | Daljeet Singh | 1,326 | 2.63% | New |
| Independent | Souninder | 806 | 1.60% | New |
| CPI | Kulwant Singh | 496 | 0.98% | New |
| Independent | Vivek Sharma | 420 | 0.83% | New |
| Margin of victory | | 5,179 | 10.26% | |
| Turnout | | 50,474 | 62.89% | |
| Registered electors | | 80,252 | | |
| BJP win (new seat) | | | | |

== See also ==
- List of constituencies of the Uttarakhand Legislative Assembly
- Udham Singh Nagar district
