= Arvind Pandey =

Indian politician

Cabinet Minister to the Government of Uttarakhand
- In office 17 March 2017 – 25 March 2022

Member of Uttarakhand Legislative Assembly
- Incumbent
- Assumed office 2012
- Preceded by: Constituency established
- Constituency: Gadarpur
- In office 2002–2012
- Preceded by: Constituency established
- Succeeded by: Yashpal Arya
- Constituency: Bajpur

Personal details
- Party: Bhartiya Janata Party
- Website: https://www.talktoarvindpandey.com

Arvind Pandey is an Indian politician and member of the Bharatiya Janata Party. Arvind Pandey was born in Bazpur. Pandey is a member of the Uttarakhand Legislative Assembly from the Gadarpur Uttarakhand Assembly constituency Gadarpur constituency in Udham Singh Nagar district.

Pandey was the member of cabinet in the state of Uttarakhand headed by chief minister Pushkar Singh Dhami.Pandey was minister for primary education and sports in government of Uttarakhand. He was also a member of Legislative Assembly from Bajpur Assembly constituency from 2002 till 2012.
