= Gadarpur Assembly constituency =

Constituency of the Uttarakhand legislative assembly in India

Coordinates: 29.04°N 79.25°E

Gadarpur
- Constituency No. 65 for the Uttarakhand Legislative Assembly

Constituency details
- Country: India
- Region: North India
- State: Uttarakhand
- District: Udham Singh Nagar district
- Lok Sabha constituency: Nainital–Udhamsingh Nagar
- Total electors: 143,746
- Reservation: None

Member of Legislative Assembly
- 5th Uttarakhand Legislative Assembly
- Incumbent Arvind Pandey
- Party: Bharatiya Janata Party
- Elected year: 2022

Gadarpur Legislative Assembly constituency is one of the seventy electoral Uttarakhand Legislative Assembly constituencies of Uttarakhand state in India. It includes Gadarpur area of Udham Singh Nagar District.

Gadarpur Legislative Assembly constituency is a part of Nainital-Udhamsingh Nagar (Lok Sabha constituency).

== Members of the Legislative Assembly ==
Election	Member	Party
2012	Arvind Pandey	Bharatiya Janata Party
2017	Arvind Pandey	Bharatiya Janata Party
2022	Arvind Pandey	Bharatiya Janata Party

== Election results ==
=== 2027 Assembly election ===
2027 Uttarakhand Legislative Assembly election: Gadarpur
Party	Candidate	Votes	%	±%
INC				
BJP				
NOTA	None of the above			
Majority				
Turnout				
gain from		Swing		

=== Assembly Election 2022 ===
2022 Uttarakhand Legislative Assembly election: Gadarpur
Party	Candidate	Votes	%	±%
BJP	Arvind Pandey	52,841	48.49%	▲6.18
INC	Premanand Mahajan	51,721	47.46%	▲19.52
AAP	Jarnail Singh Kali	1,769	1.62%	New
BSP	Jasvant Singh	1,294	1.19%	▼25.42
NOTA	None of the above	701	0.64%	▼0.13
Margin of victory		1,120	1.03%	▼13.34
Turnout		1,08,968	75.59%	▼5.30
Registered electors		1,44,150		▲18.81
BJP hold		Swing	▲6.18	

=== Assembly Election 2017 ===
2017 Uttarakhand Legislative Assembly election: Gadarpur
Party	Candidate	Votes	%	±%
BJP	Arvind Pandey	41,530	42.31%	▲9.32
INC	Rajendra Pal Singh	27,424	27.94%	▲16.10
BSP	Jarnail Singh Kali	26,115	26.61%	▲9.63
Independent	Shankar Singh Nagarkoti	835	0.85%	New
SP	Shaheroom	807	0.82%	▼8.04
NOTA	None of the above	758	0.77%	New
Margin of victory		14,106	14.37%	▲8.32
Turnout		98,147	80.89%	▼1.38
Registered electors		1,21,329		▲17.72
BJP hold		Swing	▲9.32	

=== Assembly Election 2012 ===
2012 Uttarakhand Legislative Assembly election: Gadarpur
Party	Candidate	Votes	%	±%
BJP	Arvind Pandey	27,976	32.99%	New
Independent	Jarnail Singh Kali	22,843	26.94%	New
BSP	Tarak Bachhar	14,396	16.98%	New
INC	Manishi Chandra Tiwari	10,042	11.84%	New
SP	Shaheroom	7,519	8.87%	New
Independent	Vijay Singh	1,213	1.43%	New
AITC	Dulal Mandal	534	0.63%	New
Margin of victory		5,133	6.05%	
Turnout		84,797	82.28%	
Registered electors		1,03,062		
BJP win (new seat)				

== See also ==
- Pantnagar–Gadarpur (Uttarakhand Assembly constituency)
