= Lakshman Chowk Assembly constituency =

Former constituency of the Uttarakhand Assembly, in India

Coordinates: 30.32°N 78.02°E

Lakshman Chowk
- Former constituency for the Uttarakhand Legislative Assembly

Constituency details
- Country: India
- Region: North India
- State: Uttarakhand
- District: Dehradun
- Established: 2002
- Abolished: 2012

Lakshman Chowk Legislative Assembly constituency was one of the seventy electoral Uttarakhand Legislative Assembly constituencies of Uttarakhand state in India. It was abolished in 2012 following the delimitation.

Lakshman Chowk Legislative Assembly constituency was a part of Tehri Garhwal (Lok Sabha constituency).

== Members of Legislative Assembly ==
Keys: INC

Assembly	Duration	Name of the Member	Political Party
1st	2002–2007	Dinesh Agrawal	INC
2nd	2007–2012	Dinesh Agrawal	INC

== Election results ==
=== Assembly Election 2007 ===
2007 Uttarakhand Legislative Assembly election: Lakshman Chowk
Party	Candidate	Votes	%	±%
INC	Dinesh Agrawal	32,649	46.00%	▲10.89
BJP	Nityanand Swami	29,390	41.41%	▲8.20
UKD	Vedkishor Jugran	2,418	3.41%	▲0.82
NCP	Ramsukh	1,183	1.67%	▲0.42
BSP	Salim Khan	958	1.35%	▼5.12
IUML	Imran Ahmad	923	1.30%	New
Independent	Rajender Singh	712	1.00%	New
Independent	Munis Athar	630	0.89%	New
Independent	Suresh Singh Rana	477	0.67%	New
Margin of victory		3,259	4.59%	▲2.69
Turnout		70,969	53.57%	▲9.92
Registered electors		1,32,573		▲37.15
INC hold		Swing	▲10.89	

=== Assembly Election 2002 ===
2002 Uttaranchal Legislative Assembly election: Lakshman Chowk
Party	Candidate	Votes	%	±%
INC	Dinesh Agrawal	14,803	35.11%	New
BJP	Nityanand Swami	14,000	33.21%	New
Independent	Prem Batta	3,281	7.78%	New
BSP	Shamashuddin	2,727	6.47%	New
Shivsena	Yash Pal Singh	1,211	2.87%	New
UKD	G. K. Baunthiyal	1,090	2.59%	New
SP	Sunderlal	797	1.89%	New
LJP	Khushnuda Begum	694	1.65%	New
NCP	Purna Thapa	527	1.25%	New
SAP	K. M. Pooja Subba	505	1.20%	New
Independent	Manjit Singh Sudan	503	1.19%	New
Margin of victory		803	1.90%	
Turnout		42,159	43.64%	
Registered electors		96,660		
INC win (new seat)				

== See also ==
- Dharampur (Uttarakhand Assembly constituency)
