= Kanda Assembly constituency =

Former constituency of the Uttarakhand Assembly, in India

Coordinates: 29.81°N 79.83°E

Kanda
- Former constituency for the Uttarakhand Legislative Assembly

Constituency details
- Country: India
- Region: North India
- State: Uttarakhand
- District: Bageshwar
- Established: 2002
- Abolished: 2012

Kanda Assembly constituency was one of the seventy electoral Uttarakhand Legislative Assembly constituencies of Uttarakhand state in India. It was abolished in 2012 following the delimitation.

Kanda Legislative Assembly constituency was a part of Almora (Lok Sabha constituency).

== Members of Legislative Assembly ==
Assembly	Duration	Name	Party
1st	2002–2007	Ummed Singh Majila	Indian National Congress
2nd	2007–2012	Balwant Singh Bhauryal	Bharatiya Janata Party

== Election results ==
=== Assembly Election 2007 ===
2007 Uttarakhand Legislative Assembly election: Kanda
Party	Candidate	Votes	%	±%
BJP	Balwant Singh Bhauryal	14,324	39.73%	▲14.18
INC	Umed Singh	12,221	33.89%	▲4.83
BSP	Bahadur Ram	5,280	14.64%	▲3.65
UKD	Heera Ballabh Bhatt	1,349	3.74%	▼0.51
Independent	Hayat Singh Bajetha	1,072	2.97%	New
Independent	Hargovind Joshi	885	2.45%	New
SP	Bahadur Singh	377	1.05%	▼5.83
Independent	Vijay Singh Rawat	281	0.78%	New
BJSH	Anand Singh	268	0.74%	New
Margin of victory		2,103	5.83%	▲2.32
Turnout		36,057	63.31%	▲4.27
Registered electors		57,018		▲14.51
BJP gain from INC		Swing	▲10.66	

=== Assembly Election 2002 ===
2002 Uttaranchal Legislative Assembly election: Kanda
Party	Candidate	Votes	%	±%
INC	Ummed Singh Majila	8,535	29.07%	New
BJP	Balwant Singh Bhauryal	7,503	25.55%	New
BSP	Bahadur Ram	3,229	11.00%	New
SP	Neema	2,019	6.88%	New
NCP	Ramdutt Panday	1,902	6.48%	New
Independent	Chandan Singh	1,304	4.44%	New
UKD	Pooran Chandra Bhatt	1,247	4.25%	New
Independent	Hargovind Singh	1,039	3.54%	New
Independent	Suresh Chandra Updhaya	650	2.21%	New
Independent	Kundan Singh Athani	647	2.20%	New
Independent	Ganesh Dutt	530	1.80%	New
Margin of victory		1,032	3.51%	
Turnout		29,365	59.08%	
Registered electors		49,795		
INC win (new seat)				
