= Nandaprayag Assembly constituency =

Former constituency of the Uttarakhand Legislative Assembly, in India

Coordinates: 30.33°N 79.32°E

Nandaprayag
- Former constituency for the Uttarakhand Legislative Assembly

Constituency details
- Country: India
- Region: North India
- State: Uttarakhand
- District: Chamoli
- Lok Sabha constituency: Garhwal
- Established: 2002
- Abolished: 2012

Nandaprayag Legislative Assembly constituency was one of the seventy electoral Uttarakhand Legislative Assembly constituencies of Uttarakhand state in India. It was a part of Garhwal (Lok Sabha constituency) and was abolished in 2012 following the delimitation.

== Members of Legislative Assembly ==
Assembly	Year	Name of the Member	Political Party
1st	2002	Mahendra Bhatt	BJP
2nd	2007	Rajendra Singh Bhandari	Independent

== Election results ==
=== Assembly Election 2007 ===
2007 Uttarakhand Legislative Assembly election: Nandaprayag
Party	Candidate	Votes	%	±%
Independent	Rajendra Singh Bhandari	9,849	24.29%	New
BJP	Mahendra Bhatt	8,059	19.87%	▼0.84
NCP	Balwant Singh Negi	5,581	13.76%	▼0.15
BJSH	Bhagwati Prasad Raturi	4,831	11.91%	New
INC	Satyendra Singh Bartwal	4,805	11.85%	▼3.89
CPI	Anand Singh	3,319	8.19%	▲0.66
BSP	Lakhapat Singh	2,946	7.27%	▲4.36
Independent	Kamal Kishor	622	1.53%	New
Independent	Tajbar Singh	537	1.32%	New
Margin of victory		1,790	4.41%	▼0.56
Turnout		40,549	64.25%	▲4.65
Registered electors		63,518		▲14.68
Independent gain from BJP		Swing	▲3.58	

=== Assembly Election 2002 ===
2002 Uttaranchal Legislative Assembly election: Nandaprayag
Party	Candidate	Votes	%	±%
BJP	Mahendra Bhatt	6,790	20.71%	New
INC	Satendra Bartwal	5,159	15.74%	New
NCP	Surdarshan Singh Kathait	4,561	13.91%	New
Independent	Uday Singh	3,294	10.05%	New
CPI(M)	Rajpal Kaniyal	2,671	8.15%	New
CPI	Anand Singh	2,468	7.53%	New
Independent	Chana Singh	1,751	5.34%	New
Independent	Dr. Jagdish Prasad	1,346	4.11%	New
Independent	Deependra Bhandari	956	2.92%	New
BSP	Bharat Singh	952	2.90%	New
CPI(ML)L	Indresh Maikhuri	576	1.76%	New
Margin of victory		1,631	4.97%	
Turnout		32,785	59.35%	
Registered electors		55,389		
BJP win (new seat)				
