= Bahadrabad Assembly constituency =

Former constituency of the Uttarakhand Legislative Assembly, in India

Coordinates: 29.92°N 78.04°E

Bahadrabad
- Former constituency for the Uttarakhand Legislative Assembly

Constituency details
- Country: India
- Region: North India
- State: Uttarakhand
- District: Haridwar
- Established: 2002
- Abolished: 2012

Bahadrabad was one of the 70 constituencies of the Uttarakhand Legislative Assembly, in Uttarakhand state in north India. It was abolished in 2012 following the delimitation.

Bahadrabad Legislative Assembly constituency was a part of Haridwar (Lok Sabha constituency).

== Members of Legislative Assembly ==
Assembly	Duration	Name of the Member	Political Party
1st	2002–2007	Muhammad Shahzad	Bahujan Samaj Party
2nd	2007–2012	Muhammad Shahzad	Bahujan Samaj Party

== Election results ==
=== Assembly Election 2007 ===
2007 Uttarakhand Legislative Assembly election: Bahadrabad
Party	Candidate	Votes	%	±%
BSP	Shahzad	28,759	33.86%	▲4.21
BJP	Prithvi Singh	18,413	21.68%	▼6.29
SP	Satish Kumar	15,221	17.92%	▲1.61
INC	Ramyash Singh	13,602	16.02%	▼0.93
Independent	Yamin	4,658	5.48%	New
Shivsena	Satpal	897	1.06%	New
Independent	Ajeet Kumar Sharma	695	0.82%	New
Independent	Sanjay	645	0.76%	New
UKD	Hari Shankar	580	0.68%	▼1.00
LJP	Diwan Chand	481	0.57%	New
Margin of victory		10,346	12.18%	▲10.49
Turnout		84,930	65.58%	▲7.42
Registered electors		1,29,523		▲23.00
BSP hold		Swing	▲4.21	

=== Assembly Election 2002 ===
2002 Uttaranchal Legislative Assembly election: Bahadrabad
Party	Candidate	Votes	%	±%
BSP	Shahzad	18,159	29.66%	New
BJP	Dr. Prithvi Singh Viksit	17,125	27.97%	New
INC	Ramyash Singh	10,374	16.94%	New
SP	Ram Singh Saini	9,986	16.31%	New
UKD	Ajab Singh	1,033	1.69%	New
Independent	Pilo Singh	829	1.35%	New
Uttarakhand Janwadi Party	Jitendra Kumar Chandela	789	1.29%	New
Independent	Surenra Singh Gahlot	531	0.87%	New
Independent	Jyoti Ram	461	0.75%	New
Independent	Baijnath	409	0.67%	New
Independent	Mahesh Chandra	366	0.60%	New
Margin of victory		1,034	1.69%	
Turnout		61,233	58.16%	
Registered electors		1,05,302		
BSP win (new seat)				

== See also ==
- Jwalapur (Uttarakhand Assembly constituency)
