= Iqbalpur Assembly constituency =

Former constituency of the Uttarakhand legislative assembly in India

Coordinates: 29.87°N 77.79°E

Iqbalpur
- Former constituency for the Uttarakhand Legislative Assembly

Constituency details
- Country: India
- Region: North India
- State: Uttarakhand
- District: Haridwar
- Established: 2002
- Abolished: 2012

Iqbalpur was one of the 70 constituencies of the Uttarakhand Legislative Assembly in Uttarakhand state of north India. It was abolished in 2012 following the delimitation. It was a part of Haridwar (Lok Sabha constituency).

== Members of Legislative Assembly ==
| Assembly | Duration | Name of the Member | Party |
|---|---|---|---|
| 1st | 2002–2007 | Yashveer Singh | Bahujan Samaj Party |
| 2nd | 2007–2012 | Yashveer Singh | Bahujan Samaj Party |

== Election results ==
=== Assembly Election 2007 ===
2007 Uttarakhand Legislative Assembly election: Iqbalpur
| Party | Candidate | Votes | % | ±% |
|---|---|---|---|---|
| BSP | Ch.Yashveer Singh | 29,193 | 40.98% | ▲6.58 |
| SP | Muneer Alam | 15,296 | 21.47% | ▲4.17 |
| BJP | Chhavi | 9,822 | 13.79% | ▲5.85 |
| Independent | Sharafat | 6,013 | 8.44% | New |
| INC | Riyasat | 5,400 | 7.58% | ▲0.12 |
| Independent | Harpal Singh Sathi | 3,033 | 4.26% | New |
| Independent | Amar Singh | 628 | 0.88% | New |
| RPD | Devendra | 607 | 0.85% | New |
| Margin of victory | | 13,897 | 19.51% | ▲2.41 |
| Turnout | | 71,244 | 66.05% | ▼5.50 |
| Registered electors | | 1,07,861 | | ▲23.68 |
| BSP hold | | Swing | ▲6.58 | |

=== Assembly Election 2002 ===
2002 Uttaranchal Legislative Assembly election: Iqbalpur
| Party | Candidate | Votes | % | ±% |
|---|---|---|---|---|
| BSP | Ch. Yashveer Singh | 21,462 | 34.39% | New |
| SP | Muneer Alam | 10,797 | 17.30% | New |
| Independent | Ravindra | 8,787 | 14.08% | New |
| BJP | Dr. Rampal Singh | 4,950 | 7.93% | New |
| INC | Mohd. Aslam Khan | 4,655 | 7.46% | New |
| RLD | Dr. R. S. Tyagi | 2,979 | 4.77% | New |
| NLP | Mohd. Yaseen | 2,926 | 4.69% | New |
| Independent | Dharam Pal Singh | 1,279 | 2.05% | New |
| LJP | Rekha | 978 | 1.57% | New |
| Independent | Pahal Singh | 800 | 1.28% | New |
| Independent | Lautiram | 378 | 0.61% | New |
| Margin of victory | | 10,665 | 17.09% | |
| Turnout | | 62,399 | 71.55% | |
| Registered electors | | 87,211 | | |
| BSP win (new seat) | | | | |

== See also ==
- Piran Kaliyar (Uttarakhand Assembly constituency)
