= Bironkhal Assembly constituency =

Constituency in Uttarakhand, India

Coordinates: 29.84°N 79.03°E

Bironkhal
- Former constituency for the Uttarakhand Legislative Assembly

Constituency details
- Country: India
- Region: North India
- State: Uttarakhand
- District: Pauri Garhwal
- Established: 2002
- Abolished: 2012

Bironkhal Legislative Assembly constituency was one of the seventy electoral Uttarakhand Legislative Assembly constituencies of Uttarakhand state in India. It was abolished in 2012 following the delimitation.

Bironkhal Legislative Assembly constituency was a part of Garhwal (Lok Sabha constituency).

== Members of Legislative Assembly ==
Assembly	Duration	Name of the Member	Political Party
1st	2002–2007	Amrita Rawat	Indian National Congress
2nd	2007–2012	Amrita Rawat	Indian National Congress

== Election results ==
=== Assembly Election 2007 ===
2007 Uttarakhand Legislative Assembly election: Bironkhal
Party	Candidate	Votes	%	±%
INC	Amrita Rawat	15,179	49.51%	▼3.56
BJP	Deepti Rawat	11,424	37.27%	▲13.16
UKD	Nand Kishor	1,077	3.51%	▼2.02
BSP	Pradeep Kumar Nirmal	919	3.00%	▲2.24
Independent	Chitra Singh	754	2.46%	New
BJSH	Prabhakar	546	1.78%	New
Independent	Rishi Ballabh	484	1.58%	New
Margin of victory		3,755	12.25%	▼16.72
Turnout		30,656	56.45%	▲8.20
Registered electors		54,391		▼2.01
INC hold		Swing	▼3.56	

=== Assembly Election 2002 ===
2002 Uttaranchal Legislative Assembly election: Bironkhal
Party	Candidate	Votes	%	±%
INC	Amrita Rawat	14,188	53.08%	New
BJP	Kalpeshwari Devi	6,444	24.11%	New
UKD	Nand Kishor	1,478	5.53%	New
Independent	Dr. Shivanand Nautiyal	1,191	4.46%	New
Independent	Veena Bist	905	3.39%	New
Independent	Kishori Lal Baluni	482	1.80%	New
Uttarakhand Janwadi Party	Satish Chandra	376	1.41%	New
Independent	Pushkar Singh Rawat	314	1.17%	New
Independent	Rajendra Prasad	224	0.84%	New
BSP	Guljari Lal	203	0.76%	New
Independent	Bhagat Singh Rawat	197	0.74%	New
Margin of victory		7,744	28.97%	
Turnout		26,730	48.34%	
Registered electors		55,505		
INC win (new seat)				

== See also ==
- Chaubattakhal (Uttarakhand Assembly constituency)
