= Nainital–Udhamsingh Nagar Lok Sabha constituency =

Lok Sabha Constituency in Uttarakhand

Coordinates: 29.2°N 79.52°E

Nainital–Udhamsingh Nagar UK-4
- Lok Sabha constituency
- Interactive Map Outlining Nainital-Udhamsingh Nagar Lok Sabha constituency

Constituency details
- Country: India
- Region: North India
- State: Uttarakhand
- Assembly constituencies: 14: Lalkuan, Bhimtal, Nainital, Haldwani, Kaladhungi, Jaspur, Kashipur, Bajpur, Gadarpur, Rudrapur, Kichha, Sitarganj, Nanakmatta and Khatima
- Established: 2009
- Total electors: 20,15,809
- Reservation: None

Member of Parliament
- 18th Lok Sabha
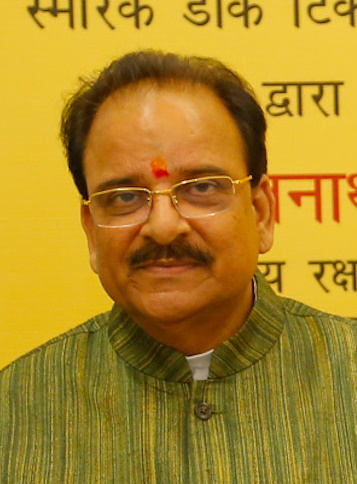
- Incumbent Ajay Bhatt
- Party: BJP
- Alliance: NDA
- Elected year: 2024

Nainital–Udhamsingh Nagar Lok Sabha constituency is one of the five Lok Sabha (parliamentary) constituencies in Uttarakhand. It comprises two districts namely Nainital (part) and Udham Singh Nagar. This constituency came into existence in 2009, following the delimitation of Lok Sabha constituencies.

== Assembly segments ==
Nainital–Udhamsingh Nagar Lok Sabha constituency comprises the following fourteen Vidhan Sabha (legislative assembly) constituency segments:

#	Name	District	Member	Party	Leading (in 2024)
56	Lalkuan	Nainital	Dr. Mohan Singh Bisht	BJP	BJP
57	Bhimtal	Nainital	Ram Singh Kaira	BJP	BJP
58	Nainital (SC)	Nainital	Sarita Arya	BJP	BJP
59	Haldwani	Nainital	Sumit Hridayesh	INC	BJP
60	Kaladhungi	Nainital	Banshidhar Bhagat	BJP	BJP
62	Jaspur	Udham Singh Nagar	Adesh Singh Chauhan	INC	INC
63	Kashipur	Udham Singh Nagar	Trilok Singh Cheema	BJP	BJP
64	Bajpur (SC)	Udham Singh Nagar	Yashpal Arya	INC	BJP
65	Gadarpur	Udham Singh Nagar	Arvind Pandey	BJP	BJP
66	Rudrapur	Udham Singh Nagar	Shiv Arora	BJP	BJP
67	Kichha	Udham Singh Nagar	Tilak Raj Behar	INC	BJP
68	Sitarganj	Udham Singh Nagar	Saurabh Bahuguna	BJP	BJP
69	Nanakmatta (ST)	Udham Singh Nagar	Gopal Singh Rana	INC	BJP
70	Khatima	Udham Singh Nagar	Bhuwan Chandra Kapri	INC	BJP

== Members of Parliament ==
Year	Member	Party
Till 2009 : Constituency did not exist
2009	Karan Chand Singh Baba	Indian National Congress
2014	Bhagat Singh Koshyari	Bharatiya Janata Party
2019	Ajay Bhatt	Bharatiya Janata Party
2024	Ajay Bhatt	Bharatiya Janata Party

== Election results ==
=== 2024 ===
2024 Indian general election: Nainital-Udhamsingh Nagar
Party	Candidate	Votes	%	±%
BJP	Ajay Bhatt	772,671	61.03	▼0.32
INC	Prakash Joshi	4,38,123	34.61	▲0.20
BSP	Akhtar Ali	23,455	1.85	▼0.41
NOTA	None of the above	10,425	0.82	▼0.02
Majority		3,34,458	26.42	▼0.52
Turnout		12,71,666	62.75	▼6.47
BJP hold		Swing		

=== General Election 2019 ===
2019 Indian general elections: Nainital-Udhamsingh Nagar
Party	Candidate	Votes	%	±%
BJP	Ajay Bhatt	772,195	61.35	▲3.54
INC	Harish Rawat	4,33,099	34.41	▲2.45
BSP	Navneet Agrawal	28,455	2.26	▼3.12
CPI(M-L)	Kailash Pandey	5,488	0.44	New
NOTA	None of the above	10,608	0.84	▼0.1
Margin of victory		3,39,096	26.94	▲1.09
Turnout		12,58,570	69.22	▲0.84
BJP hold		Swing		

=== General Election 2014 ===
2014 Indian general elections: Nainital-Udhamsingh Nagar
Party	Candidate	Votes	%	±%
BJP	Bhagat Singh Koshyari	636,769	57.81	▲26.9
INC	K. C. Singh Baba	3,52,052	31.96	▼10.68
BSP	Laik Ahmed	59,245	5.38	▼13.65
AAP	Balli Singh Cheema	13,472	1.22	New
NOTA	None of the above	10,328	0.94	▲0.94
Margin of victory		2,84,717	25.85	▲14.12
Turnout		11,01,435	68.38	
BJP gain from INC		Swing	▲21.56	

=== General Election 2009 ===
2009 Indian general elections: Nainital-Udhamsingh Nagar
Party	Candidate	Votes	%	±%
INC	K. C. Singh Baba	321,377	42.63	
BJP	Bachi Singh Rawat	2,32,965	30.90	
BSP	Narayan Pal	1,43,515	19.03	
Margin of victory		88,412	11.73	
Turnout		7,53,682	58.69	
INC win (new seat)				

== See also ==
- Nainital (Lok Sabha constituency)
- List of constituencies of the Lok Sabha
- List of parliamentary constituencies in Uttarakhand
