= Landhaura Assembly constituency =

Former constituency of the Uttarakhand Assembly, in India

Coordinates: 29.80°N 77.92°E

Landhaura
- Former constituency for the Uttarakhand Legislative Assembly

Constituency details
- Country: India
- Region: North India
- State: Uttarakhand
- District: Haridwar
- Established: 2002
- Abolished: 2012
- Reservation: SC

Landhaura Legislative Assembly constituency was one of the seventy electoral Uttarakhand Legislative Assembly constituencies of Uttarakhand state in India. It was abolished in 2012 following the delimitation.

Landhaura Legislative Assembly constituency was a part of Haridwar (Lok Sabha constituency).

== Members of Legislative Assembly ==
Year	Name	Party
2002	Hari Das	Bahujan Samaj Party
2007	Hari Das	Bahujan Samaj Party

== Election results ==
=== Assembly Election 2007 ===
2007 Uttarakhand Legislative Assembly election: Landhaura
Party	Candidate	Votes	%	±%
BSP	Hari Das	21,891	30.93%	▲0.81
BJP	Ami Lal Singh	15,387	21.74%	▲2.66
INC	S. P. Singh Engineer	12,043	17.02%	▲0.37
Independent	Jyoti Ram	11,449	16.18%	New
SP	Dhiraj Kumar Badi	4,642	6.56%	▼19.85
RLD	Dr. Sompal Singh Bawra	1,529	2.16%	▼1.31
Independent	Yashpal Pradhan	931	1.32%	New
UKD	Pratap Singh (Former D.I.G)	571	0.81%	▲0.01
Independent	Padam Singh	438	0.62%	New
Independent	Ram Chand	389	0.55%	New
Shivsena	Balbir Singh	366	0.52%	New
Margin of victory		6,504	9.19%	▲5.47
Turnout		70,765	63.44%	▼0.24
Registered electors		1,11,581		▲35.78
BSP hold		Swing	▲0.81	

=== Assembly Election 2002 ===
2002 Uttaranchal Legislative Assembly election: Landhaura
Party	Candidate	Votes	%	±%
BSP	Hari Das	15,758	30.12%	New
SP	Rajendra Kumar	13,814	26.41%	New
BJP	Subhash	9,985	19.09%	New
INC	Shish Pal Singh	8,707	16.64%	New
RLD	Balbir	1,818	3.48%	New
INLD	Kamlesh	728	1.39%	New
UKD	Harpal Singh	417	0.80%	New
LJP	Tirathpal	330	0.63%	New
Independent	Satish Kumar	326	0.62%	New
MUL	Lal Singh	306	0.58%	New
Margin of victory		1,944	3.72%	
Turnout		52,313	63.66%	
Registered electors		82,178		
BSP win (new seat)				

== See also ==
- Khanpur (Uttarakhand Assembly constituency)
