= Bhikiyasain Assembly constituency =

Former constituency of the Uttarakhand Legislative Assembly, in India

Coordinates: 29.70°N 79.27°E

Bhikiyasain
- Former constituency for the Uttarakhand Legislative Assembly

Constituency details
- Country: India
- Region: North India
- State: Uttarakhand
- District: Almora
- Lok Sabha constituency: Almora (Lok Sabha constituency)
- Established: 2002
- Abolished: 2012

Bhikiyasain Legislative Assembly constituency was one of the seventy electoral Uttarakhand Legislative Assembly constituencies of Uttarakhand state in India. It was abolished in 2012 following the delimitation. Bhikiyasain Legislative Assembly constituency was a part of Almora (Lok Sabha constituency).

== Members of Legislative Assembly ==
Election	Member	Party
2002	Pratap Singh Bisht	Indian National Congress
2007	Surendra Singh Jeena	Bharatiya Janata Party

== Election results ==
=== Assembly Election 2007 ===
2007 Uttarakhand Legislative Assembly election: Bhikiyasain
Party	Candidate	Votes	%	±%
BJP	Surendra Singh Jeena	13,615	44.54%	▲28.87
INC	Pratap Singh Bisht	9,485	31.03%	▲5.56
UKD	Prayag Datt	4,309	14.10%	▲4.52
Independent	Hema	1,029	3.37%	New
CPI(ML)L	Purushottam Sharma	778	2.54%	New
Independent	Govind Singh	451	1.48%	New
SP	Diwan Singh	340	1.11%	New
BSP	Diwan Ram	324	1.06%	▼2.44
Independent	Diwan Singh	240	0.79%	New
Margin of victory		4,130	13.51%	▲5.18
Turnout		30,571	52.68%	▲7.54
Registered electors		58,057		▼1.31
BJP gain from INC		Swing	▲19.07	

=== Assembly Election 2002 ===
2002 Uttaranchal Legislative Assembly election: Bhikiyasain
Party	Candidate	Votes	%	±%
INC	Pratap Singh Bisht	6,759	25.47%	New
Independent	Leeladhar	4,549	17.14%	New
BJP	Udaya Nand	4,157	15.66%	New
UKD	Pushkarpal Singh	2,542	9.58%	New
Independent	Tula Singh	2,125	8.01%	New
NCP	Bhawan Singh	1,106	4.17%	New
BSP	Haridesh Mehra	929	3.50%	New
Independent	Shashi	820	3.09%	New
Independent	Dikar Singh	725	2.73%	New
Independent	Digar Dev	702	2.64%	New
Independent	Pralad	496	1.87%	New
Margin of victory		2,210	8.33%	
Turnout		26,541	45.37%	
Registered electors		58,825		
INC win (new seat)				
