= Pindar Assembly constituency =

Former constituency of the Uttarakhand Legislative Assembly, in India

Coordinates: 28.90°N 79.73°E

Pindar
- Former constituency for the Uttarakhand Legislative Assembly

Constituency details
- Country: India
- Region: North India
- State: Uttarakhand
- District: Chamoli
- Established: 2002
- Abolished: 2012
- Reservation: SC

Pindar Legislative Assembly constituency was one of the seventy electoral Uttarakhand Legislative Assembly constituencies of Uttarakhand state in India. It was abolished in 2012 following the delimitation.

Pindar Legislative Assembly constituency was a part of Garhwal (Lok Sabha constituency).

== Members of Legislative Assembly ==
Election	Name	Party
2002	Govind Lal	Bharatiya Janata Party
2007	Govind Lal	Bharatiya Janata Party

== Election results ==
=== Assembly Election 2007 ===
2007 Uttarakhand Legislative Assembly election: Pindar
Party	Candidate	Votes	%	±%
BJP	Govind Lal	11,695	32.06%	▼4.70
INC	Bhupal Ram Tamta	8,562	23.47%	▼7.08
NCP	Dr. Jeet Ram	7,090	19.43%	New
UKD	Magan Lal Shah	3,543	9.71%	▲0.71
SAP	Baliram	1,692	4.64%	▲0.95
BSP	Khem Ram	1,422	3.90%	▲1.46
Independent	Harish Panchwal	1,059	2.90%	New
SP	Prem Ram Arya	717	1.97%	▼1.23
BJSH	Dhumi Lal	701	1.92%	New
Margin of victory		3,133	8.59%	▲2.38
Turnout		36,481	54.29%	▲2.81
Registered electors		67,484		▲19.40
BJP hold		Swing	▼4.70	

=== Assembly Election 2002 ===
2002 Uttaranchal Legislative Assembly election: Pindar
Party	Candidate	Votes	%	±%
BJP	Govind Lal	10,647	36.75%	New
INC	Prem Lal Bharti	8,849	30.55%	New
UKD	Kishan Lal	2,607	9.00%	New
Independent	Jas Ram	2,543	8.78%	New
Independent	Shankar Lal	1,622	5.60%	New
SAP	Mahesh Shankar	1,069	3.69%	New
SP	K. D. Kanyal	927	3.20%	New
BSP	Khem Ram	705	2.43%	New
Margin of victory		1,798	6.21%	
Turnout		28,969	51.40%	
Registered electors		56,521		
BJP win (new seat)				

== See also ==
- Tharali (Uttarakhand Assembly constituency)
