= Udham Singh Nagar district =

District in Uttarakhand, India

- District of Uttarakhand
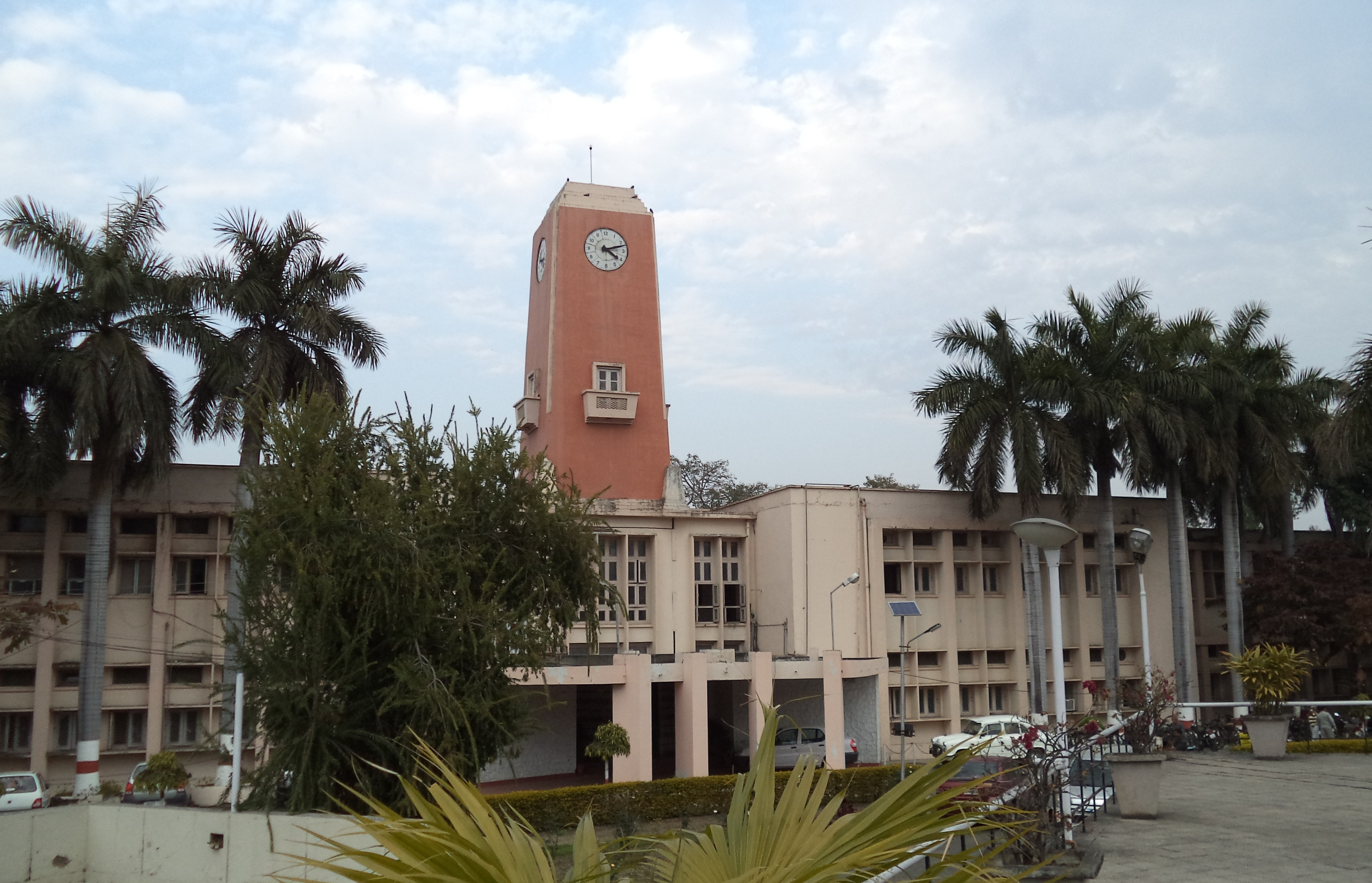
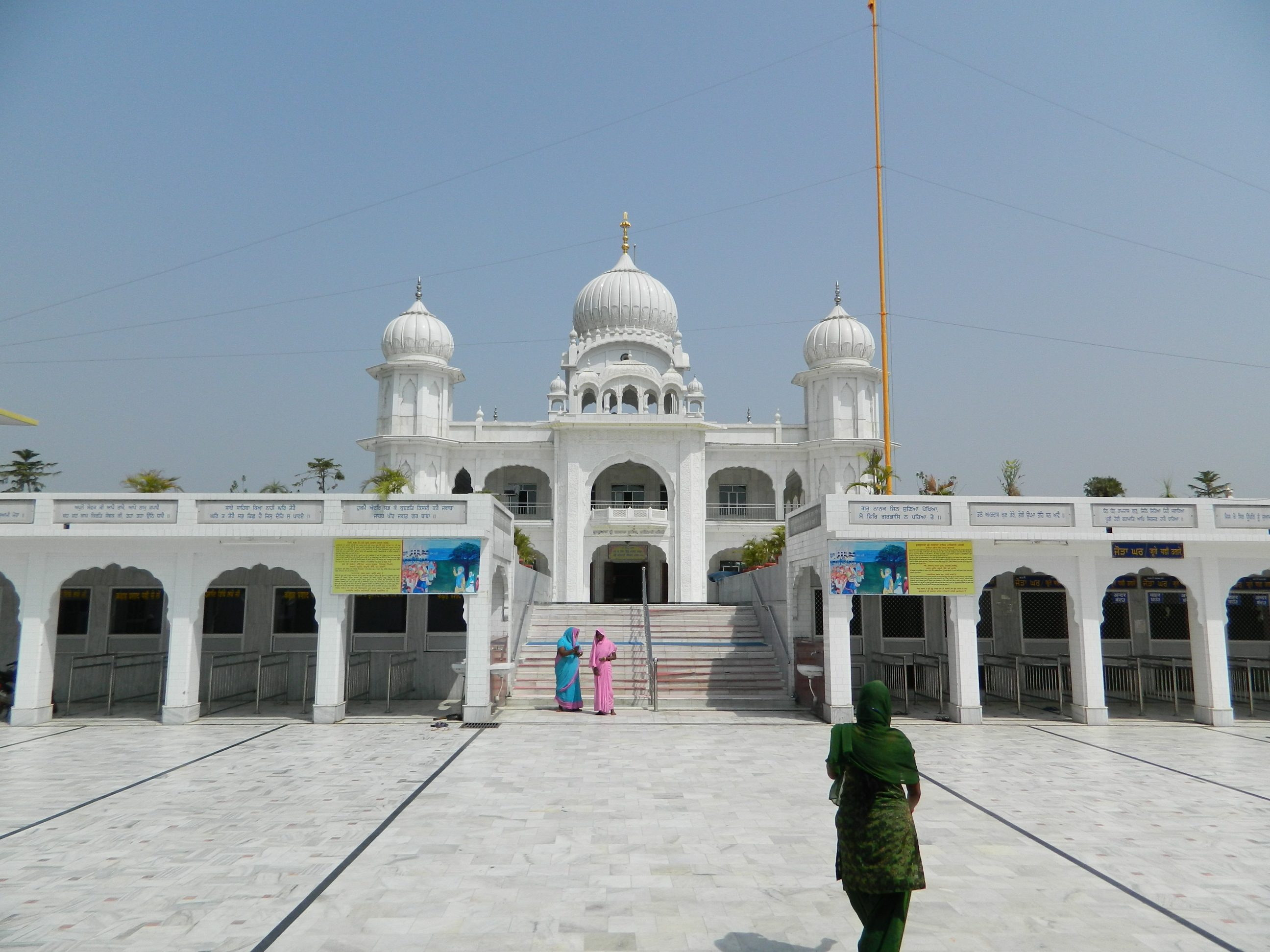
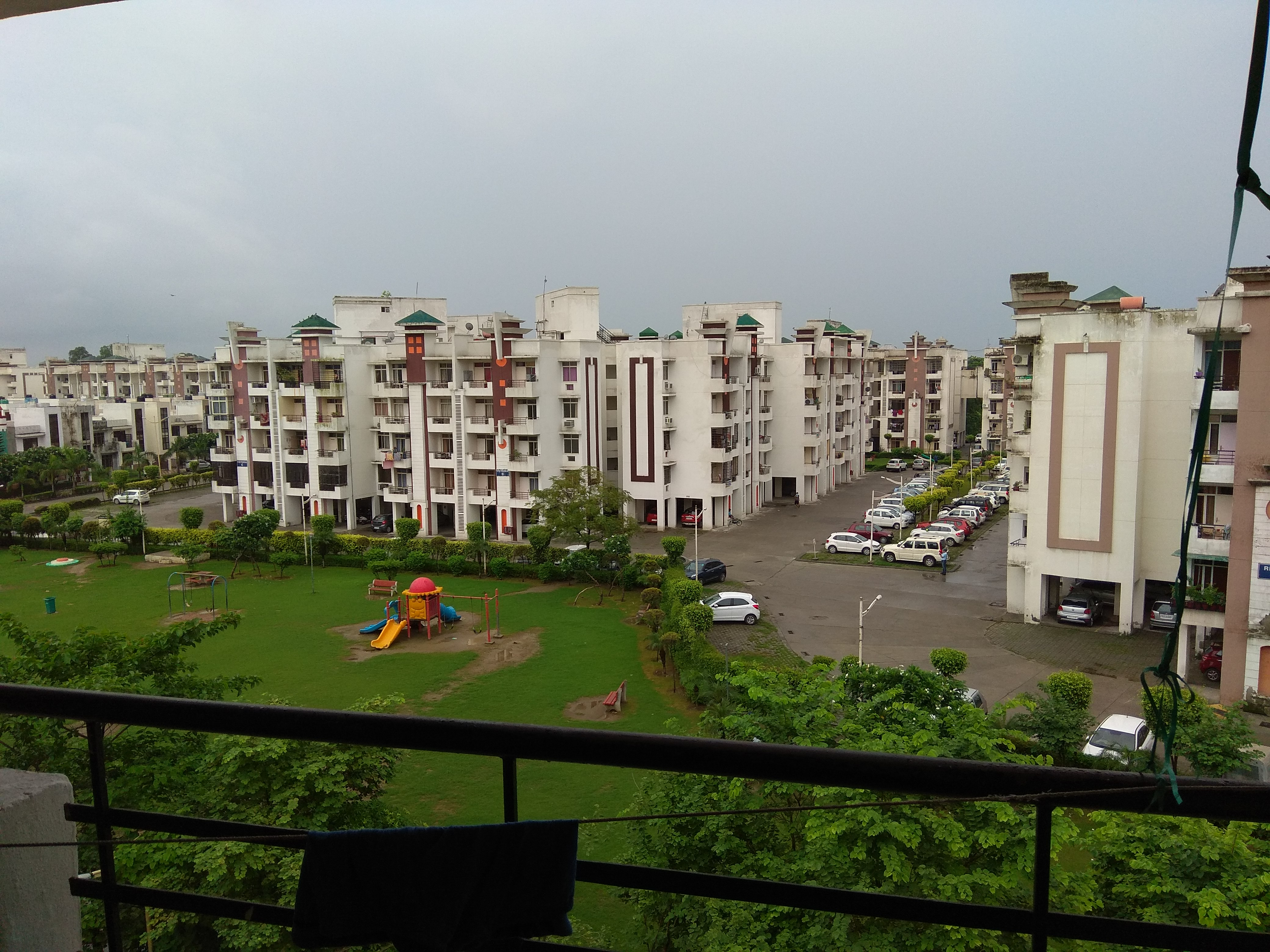
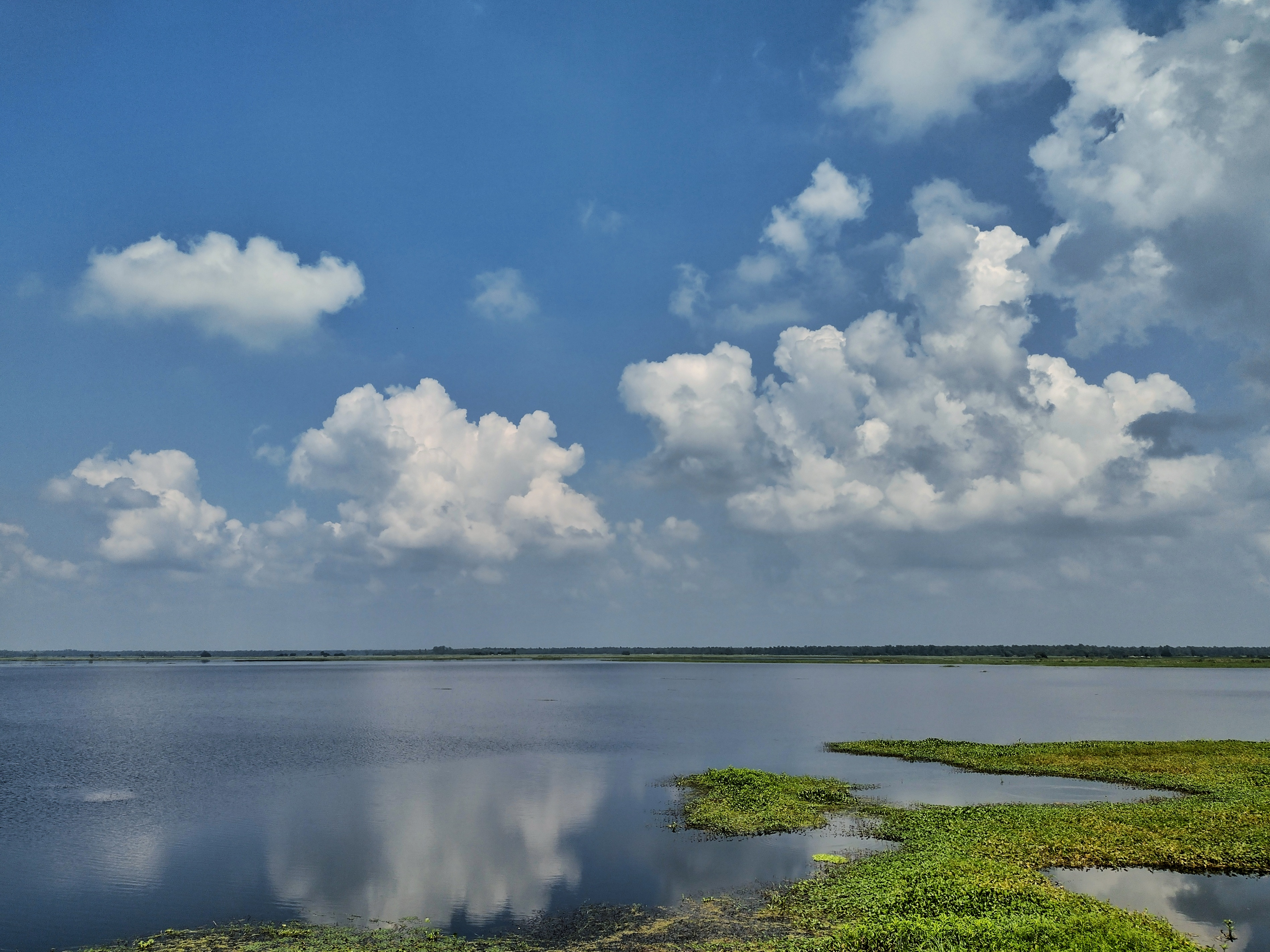
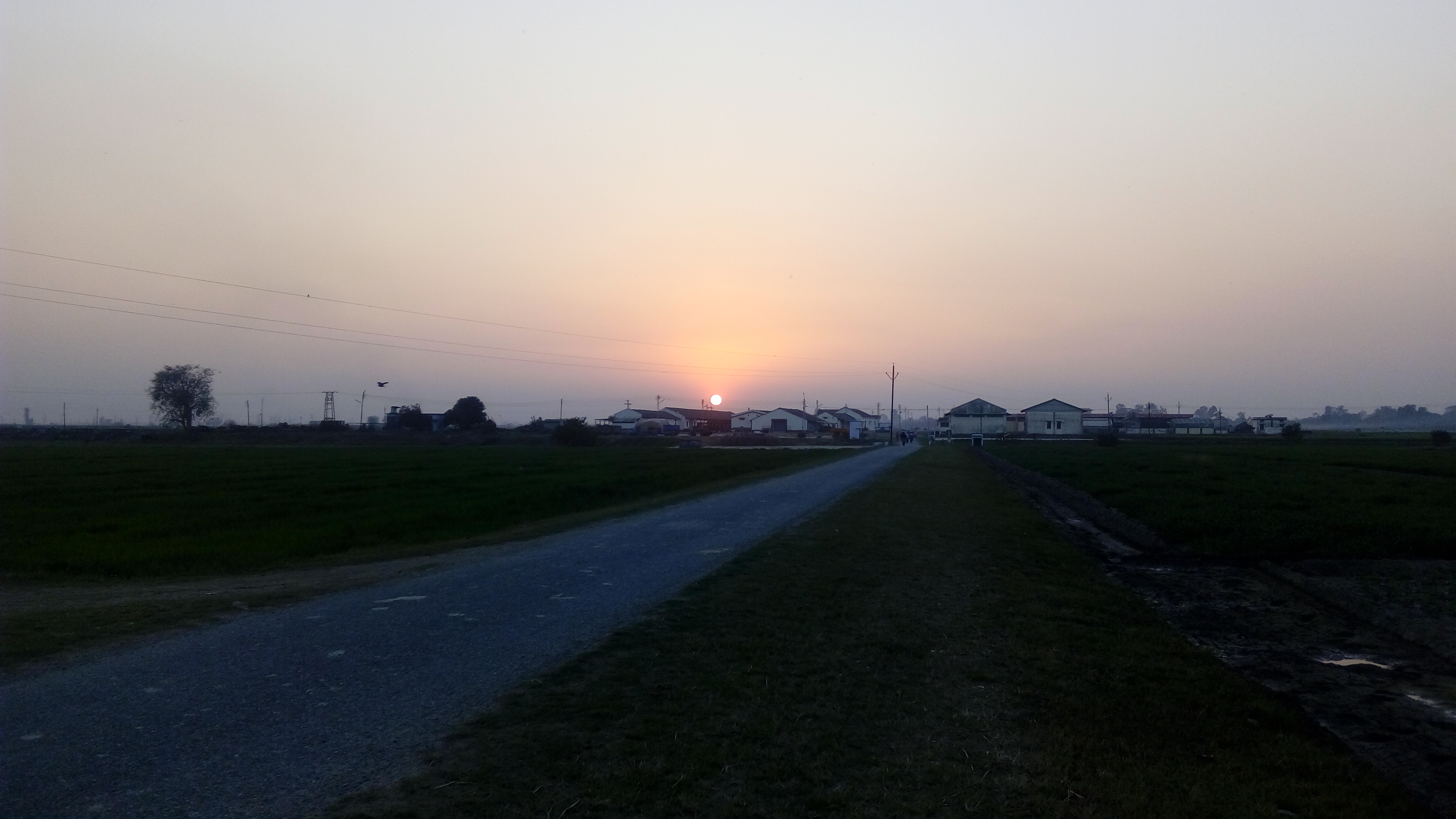
- Clockwise from top-left: Palace of Dronacharya, Gurudwara Nanakana Sahib in Kashipur, Baigul Dam, Crops Research Center at Pantnagar, Metropolis city in Rudrapur

- Location in Uttarakhand
- Coordinates: 28.98°N 79.40°E
- Country: India
- State: Uttarakhand
- Division: Kumaon
- Founder: Udham Singh Nagar has been carved out of Nainital.
- Named for: Udham Singh
- Headquarters: Rudrapur

Government
  - District Magistrate: Mr. Nitin Singh Bhadauria, IAS
  - District Chairman: Ajay Maurya

Area
  - Total: 2,542 km^{2} (981 sq mi)

Population (2011)
  - Total: 1,648,902
  - Rank: 3rd in State
  - Density: 648.7/km^{2} (1,680/sq mi)

Languages
  - Official: Hindi
  - Additional official: Sanskrit
  - Regional: Khariboli; punjabi; Tharu
- Time zone: UTC+5:30 (IST)
- Vehicle registration: UK 06, UK 18
- Website: usnagar.nic.in

Udham Singh Nagar district is a district of Uttarakhand state in northern India. Rudrapur is the district headquarter. The district consists of nine Tehsils named Bajpur, Gadarpur, Jaspur, Kashipur, Khatima, Kichha, Nanakmatta, Rudrapur, Sitarganj. The district is located in the Terai region, and is part of Kumaon Division. It is bounded on the north by Nainital District, on the northeast by Champawat District, on the east by Nepal, and on the south and west by Bareilly, Rampur, Moradabad, Pilibhit and Bijnor District of Uttar Pradesh state. The district was created on 29 September 1995, by Mayawati government out of Nainital District. It is named for freedom fighter and Indian revolutionary Udham Singh.

As of 2011, it is the third most populous district of Uttarakhand (out of 13), after Haridwar and Dehradun.

== Tehsils in Udham Singh Nagar district ==
1. Jaspur
2. Kashipur
3. Bajpur
4. Gadarpur
5. Rudrapur
6. Kichha
7. Sitarganj
8. Nanakmatta
9. Khatima

== Cities in Udham Singh Nagar ==
- Bajpur
- Dineshpur
- Jaspur
- Kashipur
- Khatima
- Kichha
- Nanakmatta
- Pantnagar
- Rudrapur
- Shaktifarm
- Sitarganj
- Sultanpur

== Administrative divisions ==
The district lies in Nainital–Udhamsingh Nagar (Lok Sabha constituency). which includes whole Nainital district as well as Udham Singh Nagar district. For election purposes Udham Singh Nagar district is divided into nine Vidhan Sabha constituencies:

1. Bajpur Assembly constituency
2. Kashipur Assembly constituency
3. Rudrapur Assembly constituency
4. Kichha Assembly constituency
5. Sitarganj Assembly constituency
6. Khatima Assembly constituency
7. Gadarpur Assembly constituency
8. Nanakmatta Assembly constituency
9. Jaspur Assembly constituency

== Demographics ==
Historical population
Year	Pop.	±% p.a.
1901	131,811	—
1911	131,608	−0.02%
1921	112,634	−1.54%
1931	112,804	+0.02%
1941	118,733	+0.51%
1951	136,446	+1.40%
1961	301,681	+8.26%
1971	451,717	+4.12%
1981	668,751	+4.00%
1991	924,856	+3.30%
2001	1,235,614	+2.94%
2011	1,648,902	+2.93%

According to the 2011 census Udham Singh Nagar district has a population of 1,648,902, roughly equal to the nation of Guinea-Bissau or the US state of Idaho. The population in the age range of 0–6 years was 229,162. The number of literates in Udham Singh Nagar district is 1,037,839 (62.9%), with 598,525 (68.7%) male literates and 751,789 (55.6%) female literates. The effective 7+ literacy of the district is 73.1%. The sex ratio of 920 females for every 1,000 males. The Scheduled Castes and Scheduled Tribes population was 238,264 (14.45%) and 123,037 (7.46%) respectively. There were 308581 households in the district in 2011.

Religions in Udham Singh Nagar district (2011)
Religion	Percent
Hinduism	66.98%
Islam	22.58%
Sikhism	9.87%
Other or not stated	0.57%

=== Languages ===
Languages of Udham Singh Nagar district (2011)
1. Hindi (62.4%)
2. Punjabi (10.1%)
3. Bengali (7.86%)
4. Urdu (6.38%)
5. Kumaoni (5.22%)
6. Bhojpuri (3.65%)
7. Tharu (2.88%)
8. Others (1.55%)

The major languages of the district according to the 2011 census are Hindi (62%), Punjabi (10%), Bengali (7.9%), Urdu (6.4%), Kumaoni (5.2%), Bhojpuri (3.6%), and Tharu (2.9%). The two Tharu languages spoken are Buksa (mostly in the development blocks of Bajpur and Gadarpur), and Rana (in the areas of Khatima and Sitarganj).

Udham Singh Nagar district: mother-tongue of population, according to the 2011 Indian Census.
Mother tongue code	Mother tongue	People	Percentage
002007	Bengali	129,537	7.9%
006030	Awadhi	1,412	0.1%
006102	Bhojpuri	60,141	3.6%
006195	Garhwali	5,840	0.4%
006240	Hindi	1,028,354	62.4%
006340	Kumauni	86,078	5.2%
006439	Pahari	2,067	0.1%
010011	Purbi Maithili	1,392	0.1%
010014	Tharu	47,501	2.9%
014011	Nepali	1,622	0.1%
016038	Punjabi	166,327	10.1%
019014	Sindhi	1,142	0.1%
022015	Urdu	105,148	6.4%
053005	Gujari	859	0.1%
–	Others	11,482	0.7%
Total		1,648,902	100.0%

== Education ==
Govind Ballabh Pant University of Agriculture & Technology in Pantnagar, is located 5 km from Rudrapur.
