= 5th Uttarakhand Assembly =

Legislature of Uttarakhand, India, 2022–

Fifth Uttarakhand Legislative Assembly

Type
- Type: Unicameral
- Houses: Uttarakhand Legislative Assembly

History
- Preceded by: 4th Uttarakhand Assembly

Leadership
- Speaker: Ritu Khanduri Bhushan, BJP since 26 March 2022
- Deputy Speaker: Vacant since 10 March 2022
- Leader of the House: Pushkar Singh Dhami, BJP since 4 July 2021
- Leader of the Opposition: Yashpal Arya, INC since 10 April 2022
- Deputy Leader of the Opposition: Bhuwan Chandra Kapri, INC since 10 April 2022
- Chief Secretary: Anand Bardhan, IAS

Structure
- Seats: 70
- Political groups: Government (47); NDA (47): BJP (47); Opposition (23): INC (20); BSP (1); IND (2)
- Length of term: 2022–2027

Elections
- Voting system: first-past-the-post
- Last election: 14 February 2022
- Next election: 2027

Meeting place
- Vidhan Bhavan, Bhararisain (Summer); Vidhan Bhavan, Dehradun (Winter)

Website
- Uttarakhand Legislative Assembly

Constitution
- Constitution of India

The 2022 Uttarakhand Legislative Assembly election had elected the incumbent fifth Uttarakhand Legislative Assembly. Currently, the incumbent Bharatiya Janata Party has 47 seats and the official opposition Indian National Congress has 20.

== Party position of the Assembly ==
Party	Abbr.	Seats	Leader in the House
Bharatiya Janata Party	BJP	47	Pushkar Singh Dhami
Indian National Congress	INC	20	Yashpal Arya
Bahujan Samaj Party	BSP	1	Muhammad Shahzad
Independent	Ind.	2	N/A
Total		70	

== Key post holders in the assembly ==
S.No.	Position	Portrait	Name	Party	Constituency	Office Taken	Ref
1	Speaker		Ritu Khanduri Bhushan	Bharatiya Janata Party	Kotdwar	26 March 2022	
2	Deputy Speaker	Vacant					
3	Leader of the House		Pushkar Singh Dhami (Chief Minister)	Bharatiya Janata Party	Champawat	23 March 2022	
4	Deputy Leader of the House		Subodh Uniyal (Parliamentary Affairs and Forest Minister)	Bharatiya Janata Party	Narendranagar	13 August 2025	
5	Leader of Opposition		Yashpal Arya	Indian National Congress	Bajpur	18 April 2022	
6	Deputy Leader of Opposition		Bhuwan Chandra Kapri	Indian National Congress	Khatima	18 April 2022	

== Members of the Fifth Uttarakhand Assembly ==
District	No.	Constituency	Name	Party	Remarks
Uttarkashi	1	Purola (SC)	Durgeshwar Lal	Bharatiya Janata Party	
Uttarkashi	2	Yamunotri	Sanjay Dobhal	Independent	
Uttarkashi	3	Gangotri	Suresh Singh Chauhan	Bharatiya Janata Party	
Chamoli	4	Badrinath	Rajendra Singh Bhandari	Indian National Congress	Resigned on 17 March 2024
Chamoli	4	Badrinath	Lakhpat Singh Butola	Indian National Congress	Elected on 13 July 2024
Chamoli	5	Tharali (SC)	Bhupal Ram Tamta	Bharatiya Janata Party	
Chamoli	6	Karnaprayag	Anil Nautiyal	Bharatiya Janata Party	
Rudraprayag	7	Kedarnath	Shaila Rani Rawat	Bharatiya Janata Party	Died on 9 July 2024
Rudraprayag	7	Kedarnath	Asha Nautiyal	Bharatiya Janata Party	Elected in November 2024 by-election
Rudraprayag	8	Rudraprayag	Bharat Singh Chaudhary	Bharatiya Janata Party	Cabinet Minister
Tehri Garhwal	9	Ghansali (SC)	Shakti Lal Shah	Bharatiya Janata Party	
Tehri Garhwal	10	Devprayag	Vinod Kandari	Bharatiya Janata Party	
Tehri Garhwal	11	Narendranagar	Subodh Uniyal	Bharatiya Janata Party	Cabinet Minister
Tehri Garhwal	12	Pratapnagar	Vikram Singh Negi	Indian National Congress	
Tehri Garhwal	13	Tehri	Kishore Upadhyaya	Bharatiya Janata Party	
Tehri Garhwal	14	Dhanaulti	Pritam Singh Panwar	Bharatiya Janata Party	
Dehradun	15	Chakrata (ST)	Pritam Singh	Indian National Congress	
Dehradun	16	Vikasnagar	Munna Singh Chauhan	Bharatiya Janata Party	
Dehradun	17	Sahaspur	Sahdev Singh Pundir	Bharatiya Janata Party	
Dehradun	18	Dharampur	Vinod Chamoli	Bharatiya Janata Party	
Dehradun	19	Raipur	Umesh Sharma 'Kau'	Bharatiya Janata Party	
Dehradun	20	Rajpur Road (SC)	Khajan Dass	Bharatiya Janata Party	Cabinet Minister
Dehradun	21	Dehradun Cantonment	Savita Kapoor	Bharatiya Janata Party	
Dehradun	22	Mussoorie	Ganesh Joshi	Bharatiya Janata Party	Cabinet Minister
Dehradun	23	Doiwala	Brij Bhushan Gairola	Bharatiya Janata Party	
Dehradun	24	Rishikesh	Premchand Aggarwal	Bharatiya Janata Party	Former Cabinet Minister
Haridwar	25	Haridwar	Madan Kaushik	Bharatiya Janata Party	Cabinet Minister
Haridwar	26	BHEL Ranipur	Adesh Chauhan	Bharatiya Janata Party	
Haridwar	27	Jwalapur (SC)	Ravi Bahadur	Indian National Congress	
Haridwar	28	Bhagwanpur (SC)	Mamta Rakesh	Indian National Congress	
Haridwar	29	Jhabrera (SC)	Virendra Kumar	Indian National Congress	
Haridwar	30	Piran Kaliyar	Furqan Ahmad	Indian National Congress	
Haridwar	31	Roorkee	Pradip Batra	Bharatiya Janata Party	Cabinet Minister
Haridwar	32	Khanpur	Umesh Kumar	Independent	
Haridwar	33	Manglaur	Sarwat Karim Ansari	Bahujan Samaj Party	Died on 30 October 2023
Haridwar	33	Manglaur	Muhammad Nizamuddin	Indian National Congress	Elected on 13 July 2024
Haridwar	34	Laksar	Muhammad Shahzad	Bahujan Samaj Party	
Haridwar	35	Haridwar Rural	Anupama Rawat	Indian National Congress	
Pauri Garhwal	36	Yamkeshwar	Renu Bisht	Bharatiya Janata Party	
Pauri Garhwal	37	Pauri (SC)	Rajkumar Pori	Bharatiya Janata Party	
Pauri Garhwal	38	Srinagar	Dhan Singh Rawat	Bharatiya Janata Party	Cabinet Minister
Pauri Garhwal	39	Chaubattakhal	Satpal Maharaj	Bharatiya Janata Party	Cabinet Minister
Pauri Garhwal	40	Lansdowne	Dilip Singh Rawat	Bharatiya Janata Party	
Pauri Garhwal	41	Kotdwar	Ritu Khanduri Bhushan	Bharatiya Janata Party	Speaker
Pithoragarh	42	Dharchula	Harish Singh Dhami	Indian National Congress	
Pithoragarh	43	Didihat	Bishan Singh Chuphal	Bharatiya Janata Party	
Pithoragarh	44	Pithoragarh	Mayukh Singh Mahar	Indian National Congress	
Pithoragarh	45	Gangolihat (SC)	Fakir Ram Tamta	Bharatiya Janata Party	
Bageshwar	46	Kapkot	Suresh Singh Garhia	Bharatiya Janata Party	
Bageshwar	47	Bageshwar (SC)	Chandan Ram Das	Bharatiya Janata Party	Died on 26 April 2023
Bageshwar	47	Bageshwar (SC)	Parwati Das	Bharatiya Janata Party	Elected on 8 September 2023
Almora	48	Dwarahat	Madan Singh Bisht	Indian National Congress	
Almora	49	Salt	Mahesh Singh Jeena	Bharatiya Janata Party	
Almora	50	Ranikhet	Pramod Nainwal	Bharatiya Janata Party	
Almora	51	Someshwar (SC)	Rekha Arya	Bharatiya Janata Party	Cabinet Minister
Almora	52	Almora	Manoj Tiwari	Indian National Congress	
Almora	53	Jageshwar	Mohan Singh Mahara	Bharatiya Janata Party	
Champawat	54	Lohaghat	Khushal Singh Adhikari	Indian National Congress	
Champawat	55	Champawat	Kailash Chandra Gahtori	Bharatiya Janata Party	Resigned on 21 April 2022
Champawat	55	Champawat	Pushkar Singh Dhami	Bharatiya Janata Party	Elected on 3 June 2022
Nainital	56	Lalkuan	Mohan Singh Bisht	Bharatiya Janata Party	
Nainital	57	Bhimtal	Ram Singh Kaira	Bharatiya Janata Party	Cabinet Minister
Nainital	58	Nainital (SC)	Sarita Arya	Bharatiya Janata Party	
Nainital	59	Haldwani	Sumit Hridayesh	Indian National Congress	
Nainital	60	Kaladhungi	Banshidhar Bhagat	Bharatiya Janata Party	
Nainital	61	Ramnagar	Diwan Singh Bisht	Bharatiya Janata Party	
Udham Singh Nagar	62	Jaspur	Adesh Singh Chauhan	Indian National Congress	
Udham Singh Nagar	63	Kashipur	Trilok Singh Cheema	Bharatiya Janata Party	
Udham Singh Nagar	64	Bajpur (SC)	Yashpal Arya	Indian National Congress	Leader of Opposition
Udham Singh Nagar	65	Gadarpur	Arvind Pandey	Bharatiya Janata Party	
Udham Singh Nagar	66	Rudrapur	Shiv Arora	Bharatiya Janata Party	
Udham Singh Nagar	67	Kichha	Tilak Raj Behar	Indian National Congress	
Udham Singh Nagar	68	Sitarganj	Saurabh Bahuguna	Bharatiya Janata Party	Cabinet Minister
Udham Singh Nagar	69	Nanakmatta (ST)	Gopal Singh Rana	Indian National Congress	
Udham Singh Nagar	70	Khatima	Bhuwan Chandra Kapri	Indian National Congress	Deputy Leader of Opposition

=== By-elections ===
S. No.	Constituency	Elected Member	Party affiliation
55	Champawat	Pushkar Singh Dhami	BJP
47	Bageshwar	Parwati Das	BJP
4	Badrinath	Lakhpat Singh Butola	INC
33	Manglaur	Muhammad Nizamuddin	INC
7	Kedarnath	Asha Nautiyal	BJP

== See also ==
- 2022 Uttarakhand Legislative Assembly election
- Second Dhami ministry
- Politics of Uttarakhand
