= 2022 Uttarakhand Legislative Assembly election =

2022 assembly elections in Uttrakhand

- 14 February 2022

All 70 seats in the Uttarakhand Legislative Assembly 36 seats needed for a majority
- Turnout: 65.41% (▼0.15 pp)
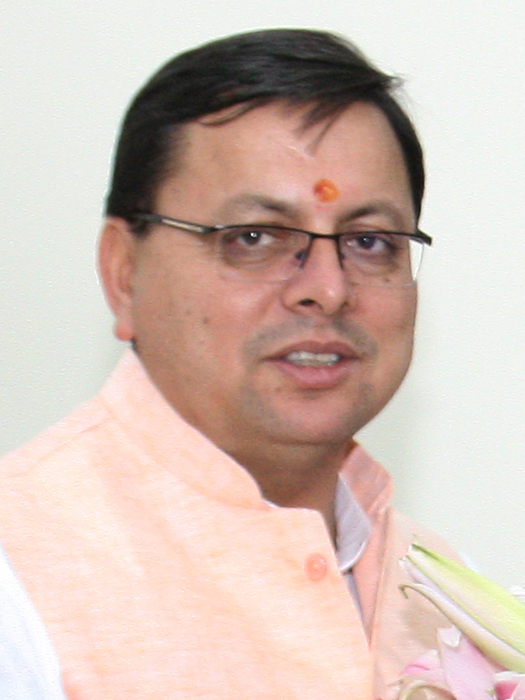

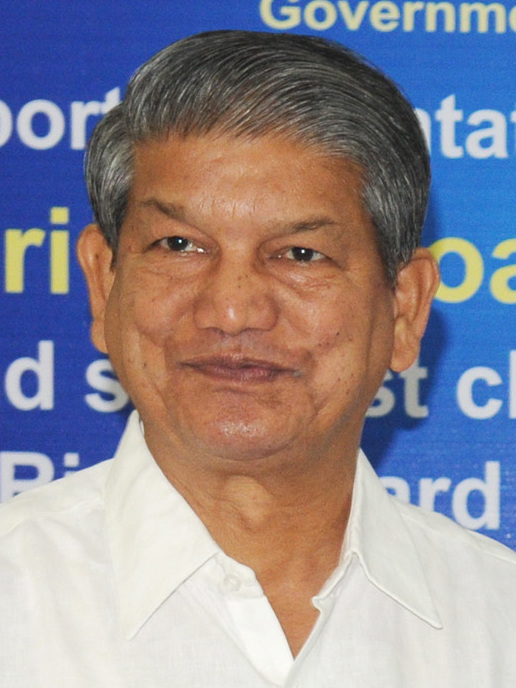
	First party	Second party	Third party
			BSP
Leader	Pushkar Singh Dhami	Harish Rawat	Shishpal Singh
Party	BJP	INC	BSP
Leader since	2021	2014	2021
Leader's seat	Khatima (lost); Champawat (by- elected)	Lalkuan (lost)	Jwalapur (lost)
Last election	46.5% 57 seats	33.5% 11 seats	7% 0 seat
Seats won	47	19	2
Seat change	▼10	▲7	▲2
Popular vote	2,583,940	2,038,509	259,371
Percentage	44.30%	37.9%	4.82%
Swing	▼1.2 pp	▲4.4 pp	▼2.2 pp
- Constituency-wise result of the 2022 Uttarakhand Legislative Assembly election

- Structure of the Uttarakhand Legislative Assembly after the election
Chief Minister before election
Pushkar Singh Dhami
BJP
Elected Chief Minister
Pushkar Singh Dhami
BJP

Legislative Assembly elections were held in Uttarakhand on 14 February 2022 to elect 70 members of the Uttarakhand Legislative Assembly. The votes were counted and the results were declared on 10 March 2022. It was the first time an incumbent government got re-elected after the creation of Uttarakhand.

The Bharatiya Janata Party formed the government for a second consecutive term with 47 seats, despite losing 10 seats. The Indian National Congress won 19 seats and served as the official opposition.

== Background ==
The tenure of Uttarakhand Legislative Assembly is scheduled to end on 23 March 2022. The previous assembly elections were held in February 2017. After the election, Bharatiya Janata Party formed the state government, with Trivendra Singh Rawat becoming Chief Minister.

=== Political developments ===
Amidst the internal turmoil in the BJP Uttarakhand unit and the mounting pressure of BJP MLAs against himself, Chief Minister Trivendra Singh Rawat resigned on 9 March 2021. Tirath Singh Rawat was sworn in as the new Chief Minister of the state on 10 March 2021.

On 2 July 2021, Tirath Singh Rawat resigned from the Chief Minister's post to avoid constitutional crisis in the state. On 3 July 2021, Pushkar Singh Dhami was sworn in as the 10th Chief Minister of Uttarakhand, assuming office on 4 July 2021.

In January 2021, Arvind Kejriwal announced that Aam Aadmi Party (AAP) would be contesting in six state elections in 2022 including Uttarakhand. On 17 August 2021, AAP declared Ajay Kothiyal as their Chief Ministerial candidate for the assembly election.

== Election schedule ==
The election schedule was announced by the Election Commission of India on 8 January 2022.

S.No.	Event	Date	Day
1.	Date for Nominations	21 January 2022	Friday
2.	Last Date for filing Nominations	28 January 2022	Friday
3.	Date for scrutiny of nominations	29 January 2022	Saturday
4.	Last date for withdrawal of candidatures	31 January 2022	Monday
5.	Date of poll	14 February 2022	Monday
6.	Date of counting	10 March 2022	Thursday

== Parties and alliances ==
Party	Flag	Symbol	Leader	Seats contested
Bharatiya Janata Party			Pushkar Singh Dhami	70
Indian National Congress			Harish Rawat	70
Aam Aadmi Party			Ajay Kothiyal	70
Communist Party of India (Marxist)			Rajendra Singh Negi	4
Communist Party of India			Samar Bhandari	4
Communist Party of India (Marxist–Leninist)			Raja Bahuguna	2
Bahujan Samaj Party			Naresh Gautam	54
Uttarakhand Kranti Dal			Diwakar Bhatt	44
Samajwadi Party			Satyanarayan Sachan	55
All India Majlis-e-Ittehadul Muslimeen			Nayyar Kazmi	4
Total Number of Candidates				

== Candidates ==
Constituency		BJP		INC	
#	Name	Party	Candidate	Party	Candidate
Uttarkashi District
1	Purola (SC)	BJP	Durgeshwar Lal	INC	Mal Chand
2	Yamunotri	BJP	Kedar Singh Rawat	INC	Deepak Bijalwan
3	Gangotri	BJP	Suresh Singh Chauhan	INC	Vijaypal Singh Sajwan
Chamoli District
4	Badrinath	BJP	Mahendra Bhatt	INC	Rajendra Singh Bhandari
5	Tharali (SC)	BJP	Bhupal Ram Tamta	INC	Prof. Jeet Ram
6	Karnaprayag	BJP	Anil Nautiyal	INC	Mukesh Negi
Rudraprayag District
7	Kedarnath	BJP	Shaila Rani Rawat	INC	Manoj Rawat
8	Rudraprayag	BJP	Bharat Singh Chaudhary	INC	Pradeep Thapliyal
Tehri Garhwal District
9	Ghansali (SC)	BJP	Shakti Lal Shah	INC	Dhani Lal Shah
10	Devprayag	BJP	Vinod Kandari	INC	Mantri Prasad Naithani
11	Narendranagar	BJP	Subodh Uniyal	INC	Om Gopal Rawat
12	Pratapnagar	BJP	Vijay Singh Panwar	INC	Vikram Singh Negi
13	Tehri	BJP	Kishore Upadhyaya	INC	Dhan Singh Negi
14	Dhanaulti	BJP	Pritam Singh Panwar	INC	Jot Singh Bisht
Dehradun District
15	Chakrata (ST)	BJP	Ram Sharan Nautiyal	INC	Pritam Singh
16	Vikasnagar	BJP	Munna Singh Chauhan	INC	Nav Prabhat
17	Sahaspur	BJP	Sahdev Singh Pundir	INC	Aryendra Sharma
18	Dharampur	BJP	Vinod Chamoli	INC	Dinesh Agrawal
19	Raipur	BJP	Umesh Sharma 'Kau'	INC	Hira Singh Bisht
20	Rajpur Road (SC)	BJP	Khajan Dass	INC	Rajkumar
21	Dehradun Cantonment	BJP	Savita Kapoor	INC	Suryakant Dhasmana
22	Mussoorie	BJP	Ganesh Joshi	INC	Godavari Thapli
23	Doiwala	BJP	Brij Bhushan Gairola	INC	Gaurav Chaudhary 'Ginni'
24	Rishikesh	BJP	Premchand Aggarwal	INC	Jayendra Ramola
Haridwar District
25	Haridwar	BJP	Madan Kaushik	INC	Satpal Brahmachari
26	BHEL Ranipur	BJP	Adesh Chauhan	INC	Rajvir Singh Chauhan
27	Jwalapur (SC)	BJP	Suresh Rathod	INC	Ravi Bahadur
28	Bhagwanpur (SC)	BJP	Satya Pal	INC	Mamta Rakesh
29	Jhabrera (SC)	BJP	Rajpal Singh	INC	Virendra Kumar
30	Piran Kaliyar	BJP	Munish Saini	INC	Furqan Ahmad
31	Roorkee	BJP	Pradip Batra	INC	Yashpal Rana
32	Khanpur	BJP	Devyani Singh	INC	Subhash Chaudhary
33	Manglaur	BJP	Dinesh Panwar	INC	Muhammad Nizamuddin
34	Laksar	BJP	Sanjay Gupta	INC	Antariksh Saini
35	Haridwar Rural	BJP	Yatishwaranand	INC	Anupama Rawat
Pauri Garhwal District
36	Yamkeshwar	BJP	Renu Bisht	INC	Shailendra Singh Rawat
37	Pauri (SC)	BJP	Raj Kumar Pori	INC	Nawal Kishor
38	Srinagar	BJP	Dr. Dhan Singh Rawat	INC	Ganesh Godiyal
39	Chaubattakhal	BJP	Satpal Maharaj	INC	Kesar Singh Negi
40	Lansdowne	BJP	Dilip Singh Rawat	INC	Anukriti Gusain
41	Kotdwar	BJP	Ritu Khanduri Bhushan	INC	Surendra Singh Negi
Pithoragarh District
42	Dharchula	BJP	Dhan Singh Dhami	INC	Harish Singh Dhami
43	Didihat	BJP	Bishan Singh Chuphal	INC	Pradeep Singh Pal
44	Pithoragarh	BJP	Chandra Pant	INC	Mayukh Singh Mahar
45	Gangolihat (SC)	BJP	Fakir Ram Tamta	INC	Khajan Chand 'Guddu'
Bageshwar District
46	Kapkot	BJP	Suresh Singh Gariya	INC	Lalit Pharswan
47	Bageshwar (SC)	BJP	Chandan Ram Das	INC	Ranjit Das
Almora District
48	Dwarahat	BJP	Anil Shahi	INC	Madan Singh Bisht
49	Salt	BJP	Mahesh Singh Jeena	INC	Ranjit Singh Rawat
50	Ranikhet	BJP	Pramod Nainwal	INC	Karan Mahra
51	Someshwar (SC)	BJP	Rekha Arya	INC	Rajendra Barakoti
52	Almora	BJP	Kailash Sharma	INC	Manoj Tiwari
53	Jageshwar	BJP	Mohan Singh Mahara	INC	Govind Singh Kunjwal
Champawat District
54	Lohaghat	BJP	Puran Singh Phartyal	INC	Khushal Singh Adhikari
55	Champawat	BJP	Kailash Chandra Gahtori	INC	Hemesh Kharkwal
Nainital District
56	Lalkuan	BJP	Dr. Mohan Singh Bisht	INC	Harish Rawat
57	Bhimtal	BJP	Ram Singh Kaira	INC	Dan Singh Bhandari
58	Nainital (SC)	BJP	Sarita Arya	INC	Sanjiv Arya
59	Haldwani	BJP	Dr. Jogendra Pal Singh Rautela	INC	Sumit Hridayesh
60	Kaladhungi	BJP	Banshidhar Bhagat	INC	Mahesh Sharma
61	Ramnagar	BJP	Diwan Singh Bisht	INC	Mahendra Singh Pal
Udham Singh Nagar District
62	Jaspur	BJP	Dr. Shailendra Mohan Singhal	INC	Adesh Singh Chauhan
63	Kashipur	BJP	Trilok Singh Cheema	INC	Narendra Chand Singh
64	Bajpur (SC)	BJP	Rajesh Kumar	INC	Yashpal Arya
65	Gadarpur	BJP	Arvind Pandey	INC	Premanand Mahajan
66	Rudrapur	BJP	Shiv Arora	INC	Meena Sharma
67	Kichha	BJP	Rajesh Shukla	INC	Tilak Raj Behar
68	Sitarganj	BJP	Saurabh Bahuguna	INC	Navtej Pal Singh
69	Nanakmatta (ST)	BJP	Dr. Prem Singh Rana	INC	Gopal Singh Rana
70	Khatima	BJP	Pushkar Singh Dhami	INC	Bhuwan Chandra Kapri

== Party manifestos ==
=== AAP ===
AAP asked the residents of Uttarakhand for suggestions for manifesto and received 71,249 replies. In addition to a main manifesto, the party will be releasing separate manifesto for each constituency. On 6 February, AAP national convener Arvind Kejriwal announced his party's 10-point manifesto for Uttarakhand if the AAP wins the election and forms the government.

1. End corruption
2. 24x7 electricity, free electricity up to 300 units
3. Employment
4. ₹1000/month for women
5. Education revolution, improvement of government schools.
6. Healthcare revolution, improvement in health facilities and building Mohalla Clinics in every village.
7. Revamp roads and build roads to every village
8. Pilgrimage (Teerth Yatra) to the elderly
9. Making Uttarakhand the spiritual capital for Hindus.
10. Govt job for retired soldiers and amount of ₹1 crore paid ex-gratia to family of soldiers after death

=== BJP ===
The Bharatiya Janata Party (BJP) has issued the manifesto for the public. Union Minister Nitin Gadkari has released the manifesto known as the "drishti patra" in a conference .

key points of the manifesto:-

- Help will be given to ex-servicemen to settle in the border areas.
- 45 new tourism spots will be developed.
- Rs 6000 from central and Rs 6000 from state government will be given under Kisan Samman Nidhi.
- 3 cylinders free of cost to poor houses in a year.
- Apart from this, Rs 2000 per month will be given to women of BPL family, Rs 1000 per month to poor children.
- 50000 government jobs will be given out of which, 24000 jobs will be given as soon as they return to power.
- The Chief Minister Trainee Scheme will be started for the unemployed. Under this, unemployed youth will be given Rs 3000 every month for a year. This will be in addition to the amount received from the Center.
- Trees will not be cut, they will be transplanted.
- The youth of Uttarakhand will be given training in tree plantation.
- Laborers and the poor will be provided with a pension of up to Rs 6,000 and an insurance cover of Rs 5 lakh.
- Jan Aushadhi Kendras will be increased from 190 to 400.
- Mobile hospitals will be developed in every area.
- Medical colleges will be developed in every district.
- Promise to give Rs 3000 every month to the women head of BPL families.
- party promised a stricter law on ‘love jihad’ and “necessary measures to stop the demographic changes in Uttarakhand” if voted back to power. “We aim to make the ‘love jihad’ law stricter with a provision of 10-years of rigorous imprisonment,” said Ramesh Pokhriyal Nishank, former Union minister and chairman of the manifesto committee.
- Annual payment of Rs 2,000 to farmers in addition to the amount they get under the Prime Minister Kisan Samman Nidhi scheme.The additional Rs 2,000 would be given to farmers under the Chief Minister Kisan Protsahan Yojana, as per the poll document.
- We will complete the Char Dham all-weather road project by the end of this year and launch seven ropeway projects, including one in Kedarnath and another in Hemkund Sahib.~Nitin Gadkari
- Give an aid of Rs 40,000 to expectant mothers living in hilly areas and increase the pension amount of senior citizens from Rs 1,400 to Rs 3,600.
- We are also going to connect all the villages in Uttarakhand with 4G/5G mobile network and high-speed broadband internet.
- To improve transport services, we will also procure 1,000 electric buses,” said chief minister Pushkar Singh Dhami.
- To ex-servicemen voters, the BJP has proposed to start a credit guarantee fund trust in the name of late CDS General Bipin Rawat. The beneficiaries will get a 50% guarantee cover for credit of up to Rs 5 lakh.
- BJP manifesto promises the setting up of medical colleges in each district and establishing a satellite centre of AIIMS Rishikesh in the Kumaon region.
- setting up a special fund of Rs 1,000 crore to establish 50 modern farm storage and cold storage facilities, giving a subsidy of Rs 10,000 to the elderly for pilgrimage, developing five hill stations on the lines of Mussoorie and Nainital, and setting up of an eco-tourism promotion board and an adventure tourism promotion board, among others.

=== INC ===
INC released its manifesto on 2 February 2022 titled 'Uttarakhand Swabhiman Pratigya Patra'. Earlier on 24 January 2022 the party launched its campaign for Uttarakhand with the tagline “Char Dham, Char Kaam”. The four "kaam" (promises) made in the manifesto are

1. Capping the price of a gas cylinder for consumers at ₹500
2. Income support of ₹40,000 annually for the poorest five lakh families
3. Doorstep Medical service under ‘Health facilities Har Gaon Har Dwar’ initiative
4. Ensuring employment opportunities to 4 lakh youth
5. Free travel for women in state transport
6. Filling up 57,000 vacancies in various government departments within a year of voting to power
7. Setting up of the state's “first sports university”
8. Withdrawing cases against farmers filed during protests against the now-repealed farm laws
9. Modernise sugar mills and improve the mechanism of payment to the sugarcane farmers
10. Comprehensive educational framework with increased budget allocation
11. Resume “Mere Bujurg Mere Teerth” (my elders my pilgrimage) along with pension to the senior citizens

== Campaigns ==
Samyukt Kisan Morcha (SKM), the umbrella body of farmers, campaigned against the ruling BJP by organizing public meetings and rallies asking farmers to not vote for BJP. SKM had organised the 2020–2021 Indian farmers' protest against the controversial three farm acts which were passed by the BJP-led Union Government in the BJP controlled Parliament of India in September 2020. These laws were eventually withdrawn by the Union government.

On 31 January 2022, the farmer leaders observed "Vishwasghat Diwas" (treachery day) across India after the Union government failed to fulfill promises that were made to the farmers during the withdrawal of agitation against three farm laws. SKM leaders have warned that the farm laws may be re-introduced if BJP wins the elections.

SKM leaders launched "Mission UP and Uttarakhand" and appealed to the voters to not vote for BJP calling them "anti-farmer". The appeal did not suggest to vote for any political party. SKM's appeal was supported by 57 farmer organisations. The campaign rallies were banned due to COVID-19, so pandemic leaflets with the appeal were handed to the villagers.

=== Policy positions ===
==== Farm laws ====
BJP's Union Agriculture Minister Narendra Singh Tomar in December 2021, had said that BJP brought the three agriculture amendment laws (repealed in 2021). "But the government is not disappointed. We moved a step back and we will move forward again because farmers are India’s backbone."

The INC and AAP are against the farm laws and had supported the farmers' unions during their year-long protest against the farm laws.

== Poll prediction ==
=== Opinion polls ===
Polling aggregates
- Active Parties
- Bharatiya Janata Party
- Indian National Congress
- Aam Aadmi Party
- Others

Date	Polling agency					Lead
Date	Polling agency	NDA	UPA	AAP	Others	Lead
7 February 2022	ABP News - C-Voter	42.6%	40.6%	13.0%	3.9%	2.0%
10 January 2022	ABP News - C-Voter	38.6%	37.2%	12.6%	11.7%	1.4%
22 December 2021	NewsX - Pollstrat	40.5%	34.2%	10.4%	14.9%	6.3%
11 December 2021	ABP News - C-Voter	39.8%	35.7%	12.6%	11.9%	4.1%
12 November 2021	ABP News - C-Voter	41.4%	36.3%	11.8%	10.5%	5.1%
8 October 2021	ABP News - C-Voter	44.6%	34.0%	14.7%	6.7%	10.6%
3 September 2021	ABP News - C-Voter	43.1%	32.6%	14.6%	9.7%	10.5%
18 March 2021	ABP News - C-Voter	38.3%	40.8%	9.2%	11.7%	2.5%

Date	Polling agency					Lead	Remarks
Date	Polling agency	NDA	UPA	AAP	Others	Lead	Remarks
7 February 2022	ABP News - C-Voter	31-37	30-36	2-4	0-1	0-7	Hung
10 January 2022	ABP News - C-Voter	31-37	30-36	2-4	0-1	0-7	Hung
22 December 2021	NewsX - Pollstrat	36-41	25-30	2-4	0-1	6-16	BJP majority
11 December 2021	ABP News - C-Voter	33-39	29-35	1-3	0-1	0-10	Hung
12 November 2021	ABP News - C-Voter	36-40	30-34	0-2	0-1	2-10	BJP majority
8 October 2021	ABP News - C-Voter	42-46	21-25	0-4	0-2	17-25	BJP majority
3 September 2021	ABP News - C-Voter	44-48	19-23	0-4	0-2	21-29	BJP majority
18 March 2021	ABP News - C-Voter	24-30	32-38	2-8	0-9	2-14	Hung
10 March	Election results	47	19	0	4	28	NDA majority

=== Exit polls ===
The Election Commission banned the media from publishing exit polls between 7 AM on 10 February 2022 and 6:30 PM on 7 March 2022. Violation of the directive would be punishable with two years of imprisonment. Accordingly, the exit polls below were published in the evening of 7 March.

Polling agency					Lead	Remarks
Polling agency	NDA	UPA	AAP	Others	Lead	Remarks
ABP News C-Voter	26-32	32-38	0-2	3-7	0-12	Hung
NewsX Polstrat	31-33	33-35	0-3	0-2	0-4	Hung
Today's Chanakya	43	24	3		19	BJP Majority
India Today - Axis My India	36-46	20-30	4-9		6-26	BJP Majority
India TV - CNX	35-43	24-32	0-0	2-4	0-8	BJP Majority
ETG Research	37-40	29-32	0-1	0-2	5-11	BJP Majority
India News - Jan Ki Baat	32-41	27-35	0-1	0-4	0-14	Hung
Times Now - VETO	37	31	1	1	8	BJP Majority
Republic - P-Marq	29-34	33-37	1-3	1-3	0-8	Hung
Election results	47	19	0	4	28	BJP majority

== Voter turnout ==
District	Seats	Turnout (%)
Uttarkashi	3	68.48
Chamoli	3	62.38
Rudraprayag	2	63.16
Tehri Garhwal	6	56.34
Dehradun	10	63.69
Haridwar	11	74.77
Pauri Garhwal	6	54.87
Pithoragarh	4	60.80
Bageshwar	2	63.00
Almora	6	53.71
Champawat	2	62.66
Nainital	6	66.35
Udham Singh Nagar	9	72.27
Total	70	65.37

== Results ==
=== Results by alliance and party ===
Vote share
1. BJP (44.3%)
2. INC (37.9%)
3. BSP (4.82%)
4. AAP (3.31%)
5. UKD (1.08%)
6. Others (8.55%)
Seat share
1. BJP (67.1%)
2. INC (27.1%)
3. BSP (2.86%)
4. IND (2.86%)

Parties and coalitions	Popular vote			Seats		
Parties and coalitions	Votes	%	±pp	Contested	Won	+/−
Bharatiya Janata Party	2,583,940	44.30%	▼2.20	70	47	10▼
Indian National Congress	2,038,509	37.9%	▲4.39	70	19	▲8
Bahujan Samaj Party	259,371	4.82%	▼2.18	54	2	▲2
Aam Aadmi Party	178,134	3.31%	▲3.31	70	0	Steady
Uttarakhand Kranti Dal	58,218	1.08%	▲0.40	44	0	Steady
Independents	300,059	5.58		152	2	Steady
Others		2.1				
NOTA	46,818	0.87				
Total						
Valid votes						
Invalid votes						
Votes cast/ turnout						
Abstentions						
Registered voters						

=== Results by division ===
Divisions	Seats			
Divisions	Seats	BJP	INC	OTH
Garhwal	41	29	8	4
Kumaon	29	18	11	—N/a
Total	70	47	19	4

=== Results by district ===
Divisions	Seats			
Divisions	Seats	BJP	INC	OTH
Garhwal Division
Uttarkashi	3	2	—N/a	1
Chamoli	3	2	1	—N/a
Rudraprayag	2	2	—N/a	—N/a
Tehri Garhwal	6	5	1	—N/a
Dehradun	10	9	1	—N/a
Haridwar	11	3	5	3
Pauri Garhwal	6	6	—N/a	—N/a
Kumaon Division
Pithoragarh	4	2	2	—N/a
Bageshwar	2	2	—N/a	—N/a
Almora	6	4	2	—N/a
Champawat	2	1	1	—N/a
Nainital	6	5	1	—N/a
Udham Singh Nagar	9	4	5	—N/a
Total	70	47	19	4

=== Results by constituency ===
District	Constituency		Turnout	Winner				Runner-up				Margin
District	#	Name	Turnout	Candidate	Party	Votes	%	Candidate	Party	Votes	%	Margin
Uttarkashi	1	Purola (SC)	69.40	Durgeshwar Lal	BJP	27,856	53.95	Mal Chand	INC	21,560	41.76	6,296
Uttarkashi	2	Yamunotri	68.12	Sanjay Dobhal	IND	22,952	44.01	Deepak Bijalwan	INC	16,313	31.28	6,639
Uttarkashi	3	Gangotri	68.01	Suresh Singh Chauhan	BJP	29,619	49.66	Vijaypal Singh Sajwan	INC	21,590	36.20	8,029
Chamoli	4	Badrinath	65.65	Rajendra Singh Bhandari	INC	32,661	47.88	Mahendra Bhatt	BJP	30,595	44.85	2,066
Chamoli	5	Tharali (SC)	60.34	Bhupal Ram Tamta	BJP	32,852	51.66	Prof. Jeet Ram	INC	24,550	38.61	8,302
Chamoli	6	Karanprayag	61.04	Anil Nautiyal	BJP	28,911	48.99	Mukhesh Negi	INC	22,196	37.61	6,715
Rudraprayag	7	Kedarnath	66.43	Shaila Rani Rawat	BJP	21,886	36.04	Kuldeep Singh Rawat	IND	13,423	22.11	8,463
Rudraprayag	8	Rudraprayag	60.34	Bharat Singh Chaudhary	BJP	29,660	46.78	Pradeep Thapliyal	INC	19,858	31.32	9,802
Tehri Garhwal	9	Ghansali (SC)	50.38	Shakti Lal Shah	BJP	20,949	42.09	Dhani Lal Shah	INC	10,664	21.43	10,285
Tehri Garhwal	10	Deoprayag	54.94	Vinod Kandari	BJP	17,330	36.11	Diwakar Bhatt	UKD	14,742	30.72	2,588
Tehri Garhwal	11	Narendranagar	62.18	Subodh Uniyal	BJP	27,430	47.83	Om Gopal Rawat	INC	25,632	44.70	1,798
Tehri Garhwal	12	Pratapnagar	49.99	Vikram Singh Negi	INC	19,131	44.67	Vijay Singh Panwar	BJP	16,790	39.21	2,340
Tehri Garhwal	13	Tehri	55.03	Kishore Upadhyaya	BJP	19,802	42.31	Dinesh Dhanai	UJP	18,851	40.28	951
Tehri Garhwal	14	Dhanaulti	65.89	Pritam Singh Panwar	BJP	22,827	40.22	Jot Singh Bisht	INC	18,143	31.93	4,684
Dehradun	15	Chakrata (ST)	68.24	Pritam Singh	INC	36,853	50.64	Ram Sharan Nautiyal	BJP	27,417	37.67	9,436
Dehradun	16	Vikasnagar	75.74	Munna Singh Chauhan	BJP	40,819	50.04	Nav Prabhat	INC	35,626	43.67	4,563
Dehradun	17	Sahaspur	72.98	Sahdev Singh Pundir	BJP	64,008	50.86	Aryendra Sharma	INC	55,653	44.22	8,355
Dehradun	18	Dharampur	57.35	Vinod Chamoli	BJP	58,538	49.25	Dinesh Agrawal	INC	48,448	40.76	10,090
Dehradun	19	Raipur	61.33	Umesh Sharma 'Kau'	BJP	65,756	60.15	Hira Singh Bisht	INC	35,704	32.66	30,052
Dehradun	20	Rajpur Road (SC)	57.75	Khajan Dass	BJP	37,027	53.62	Rajkumar	INC	25,864	37.45	11,163
Dehradun	21	Dehradun Cantonment	56.89	Savita Kapoor	BJP	45,492	59.16	Suryakant Dhasmana	INC	24,554	31.93	20,938
Dehradun	22	Mussoorie	60.01	Ganesh Joshi	BJP	44,847	56.49	Godavari Thapli	INC	29,522	37.19	15,325
Dehradun	23	Doiwala	68.06	Brij Bhushan Gairola	BJP	64,946	57.22	Gaurav Chaudhary 'Ginni'	INC	35,925	31.65	29,021
Dehradun	24	Rishikesh	62.21	Premchand Aggarwal	BJP	52,125	50.04	Jayendra Ramola	INC	33,403	31.86	19,057
Haridwar	25	Haridwar	64.89	Madan Kaushik	BJP	53,147	55.45	Satpal Brahmachari	INC	37,910	39.56	15,237
Haridwar	26	BHEL Ranipur	69.08	Adesh Chauhan	BJP	57,544	50.61	Rajvir Singh Chauhan	INC	43,682	38.42	13,862
Haridwar	27	Jwalapur (SC)	79.35	Ravi Bahadur	INC	42,372	45.68	Suresh Rathod	BJP	29,029	31.30	13,343
Haridwar	28	Bhagwanpur (SC)	79.92	Mamta Rakesh	INC	44,808	45.38	Subodh Rakesh	BSP	39,997	40.49	4,811
Haridwar	29	Jhabrera (SC)	78.42	Virendra Kumar	INC	39,652	41.55	Rajpal Singh	BJP	31,346	32.94	8,036
Haridwar	30	Piran Kaliyar	77.44	Furqan Ahmad	INC	43,539	44.16	Munish Saini	BJP	27,796	28.19	15,743
Haridwar	31	Roorkee	63.10	Pradip Batra	BJP	36,986	48.21	Yashpal Rana	INC	34,709	45.24	2,277
Haridwar	32	Khanpur	76.85	Umesh Kumar	IND	38,767	34.18	Ravindra Singh	BSP	31,915	28.14	6,852
Haridwar	33	Manglaur	75.95	Sarwat Karim Ansari	BSP	32,660	37.18	Muhammad Nizamuddin	INC	32,062	36.50	598
Haridwar	34	Laksar	79.51	Muhammad Shahzad	BSP	34,899	42.77	Sanjay Gupta	BJP	24,459	29.98	10,440
Haridwar	35	Haridwar Rural	81.94	Anupama Rawat	INC	50,028	46.59	Yatishwaranand	BJP	45,556	42.42	4,472
Pauri Garhwal	36	Yamkeshwar	53.94	Renu Bisht	BJP	28,390	58.98	Shailendra Singh Rawat	INC	17,980	37.35	10,410
Pauri Garhwal	37	Pauri (SC)	51.82	Raj Kumar Pori	BJP	25,865	52.60	Naval Kishor	INC	20,127	40.93	5,738
Pauri Garhwal	38	Srinagar	59.71	Dr. Dhan Singh Rawat	BJP	29,618	45.55	Ganesh Godiyal	INC	29,031	44.65	587
Pauri Garhwal	39	Chaubattakhal	45.33	Satpal Maharaj	BJP	24,927	58.72	Kesar Singh Rawat	INC	13,497	31.80	11,430
Pauri Garhwal	40	Lansdowne	48.12	Dilip Singh Rawat	BJP	24,504	59.18	Anukriti Gusain	INC	14,636	35.35	9,868
Pauri Garhwal	41	Kotdwar	65.92	Ritu Khanduri Bhushan	BJP	32,103	41.58	Surendra Singh Negi	INC	28,416	36.81	3,687
Pithoragarh	42	Dharchula	62.74	Harish Singh Dhami	INC	27,007	47.95	Dhan Singh Dhami	BJP	25,889	45.96	1,118
Pithoragarh	43	Didihat	64.01	Bishan Singh Chuphal	BJP	20,594	37.69	Kishan Bhandari	IND	14,298	26.17	3,226
Pithoragarh	44	Pithoragarh	62.15	Mayukh Singh Mahar	INC	33,269	47.48	Chandra Pant	BJP	27,215	38.84	6,054
Pithoragarh	45	Gangolihat (SC)	55.39	Fakir Ram Tamta	BJP	32,296	55.65	Khajan Chand 'Guddu'	INC	22,243	38.33	10,053
Bageshwar	46	Kapkot	63.71	Suresh Singh Gariya	BJP	31,275	48.83	Lalit Pharswan	INC	27,229	42.51	4,046
Bageshwar	47	Bageshwar (SC)	62.40	Chandan Ram Das	BJP	32,211	43.14	Ranjit Das	INC	20,070	26.88	12,141
Almora	48	Dwarahat	52.72	Madan Singh Bisht	INC	17,766	36.19	Anil Shahi	BJP	17,584	35.82	182
Almora	49	Salt	45.92	Mahesh Singh Jeena	BJP	22,393	49.65	Ranjit Singh Rawat	INC	18,705	41.47	3,688
Almora	50	Ranikhet	51.80	Pramod Nainwal	BJP	21,047	50.05	Karan Mahra	INC	18,463	43.90	2,584
Almora	51	Someshwar (SC)	56.92	Rekha Arya	BJP	26,161	52.09	Rajendra Barakoti	INC	20,868	41.55	5,293
Almora	52	Almora	59.19	Manoj Tiwari	INC	24,439	44.90	Kailash Sharma	BJP	24,312	44.67	127
Almora	53	Jageshwar	56.07	Mohan Singh Mahara	BJP	27,530	52.04	Govind Singh Kunjwal	INC	21,647	40.92	5,883
Champawat	54	Lohaghat	58.96	Khushal Singh Adhikari	INC	32,950	51.65	Puran Singh Phartyal	BJP	26,912	42.18	6,038
Champawat	55	Champawat	66.80	Kailash Chandra Gahtori	BJP	32,547	50.26	Hemesh Kharkwal	INC	27,243	42.07	5,403
Nainital	56	Lalkuan	72.56	Mohan Singh Bisht	BJP	46,307	53.23	Harish Rawat	INC	28,780	33.08	17,527
Nainital	57	Bhimtal	65.44	Ram Singh Kaira	BJP	25,632	38.69	Dan Singh Bhandari	INC	15,788	23.83	9,444
Nainital	58	Nainital (SC)	55.25	Sarita Arya	BJP	31,770	52.19	Sanjiv Arya	INC	23,889	39.25	7,881
Nainital	59	Haldwani	65.65	Sumit Hridayesh	INC	50,116	50.18	Dr. Jogendra Pal Singh Rautela	BJP	42,302	42.36	7,814
Nainital	60	Kaladhungi	68.25	Banshidhar Bhagat	BJP	67,847	57.34	Mahesh Sharma	INC	43,916	37.12	23,931
Nainital	61	Ramnagar	69.15	Diwan Singh Bisht	BJP	31,094	37.44	Mahendra Singh Pal	INC	26,349	31.72	4,745
Udham Singh Nagar	62	Jaspur	74.39	Adesh Singh Chauhan	INC	42,886	43.81	Dr. Shailendra Mohan Singhal	BJP	38,714	39.55	4,172
Udham Singh Nagar	63	Kashipur	64.26	Trilok Singh Cheema	BJP	48,508	42.79	Narendra Chand Singh	INC	32,173	28.38	16,335
Udham Singh Nagar	64	Bajpur (SC)	72.04	Yashpal Arya	INC	40,252	36.76	Rajesh Kumar	BJP	38,641	35.29	1,611
Udham Singh Nagar	65	Gadarpur	75.64	Arvind Pandey	BJP	52,841	48.49	Premanand Mahajan	INC	51,721	47.46	1,120
Udham Singh Nagar	66	Rudrapur	68.24	Shiv Arora	BJP	60,602	45.69	Meena Sharma	INC	40,852	30.80	19,850
Udham Singh Nagar	67	Kichha	71.66	Tilak Raj Behar	INC	49,552	49.52	Rajesh Shukla	BJP	39,475	39.44	10,077
Udham Singh Nagar	68	Sitarganj	78.64	Saurabh Bahuguna	BJP	43,354	44.81	Navtej Pal Singh	INC	32,416	33.50	10,938
Udham Singh Nagar	69	Nanakmatta (ST)	74.16	Gopal Singh Rana	INC	48,746	52.94	Dr. Prem Singh Rana	BJP	35,726	38.80	13,020
Udham Singh Nagar	70	Khatima	76.63	Bhuwan Chandra Kapri	INC	48,177	51.89	Pushkar Singh Dhami	BJP	41,598	44.80	6,579

== See also ==
- 5th Uttarakhand Assembly
- Second Dhami ministry
- Elections in Uttarakhand
- Politics of Uttarakhand
- 2022 elections in India
- Next Uttarakhand Legislative Assembly election
