= Uttarakhand Legislative Assembly =

Unicameral legislature of the Indian state of Uttarakhand

- 5th Uttarakhand Assembly

Type
- Type: Unicameral
- Term limits: 5 years

History
- Founded: 14 February 2002 (24 years ago)
- Preceded by: Uttar Pradesh Legislative Assembly

Leadership
- Speaker: Ritu Khanduri Bhushan, BJP since 26 March 2022
- Deputy Speaker: vacant since 10 March 2022
- Chief Minister (Leader of the House): Pushkar Singh Dhami, BJP since 4 July 2021
- Leader of the Opposition: Yashpal Arya, INC since 10 April 2022
- Deputy Leader of the Opposition: Bhuwan Chandra Kapri, INC since 10 April 2022
- Chief Secretary: Anand Bardhan, IAS

Structure
- Seats: 70
- Political groups: Government (47) BJP (47) Opposition (22) INC (20) BSP (1) IND (1) Vacant (1) Vacant (1)

Elections
- Voting system: First-past-the-post
- Last election: 14 February 2022
- Next election: 2027
- Redistricting: 2012

Meeting place
- Vidhan Bhavan, Gairsain (summer); Vidhan Bhavan, Dehradun (winter)

Website
- Uttarakhand Legislative Assembly

Constitution
- Constitution of India

The Uttarakhand Legislative Assembly, also known as the Uttarakhand Vidhan Sabha (formerly the Uttaranchal Legislative Assembly), is a unicameral governing and law making body of Uttarakhand, one of the 28 states of India. It is seated at Dehradun, the winter capital, and Gairsain, the summer capital of Uttarakhand. The total strength of the assembly is 70 Members of the Legislative Assembly (MLA).

As of March 2022, Pushkar Singh Dhami is the current Chief Minister of Uttarakhand and Leader of the House in the 5th Vidhan Sabha. The Speaker of the Assembly is Ritu Khanduri Bhushan. Gurmit Singh is the current Governor of Uttarakhand.

== Composition ==
| Party | Abbr. | Seats | Leader in the House |
|---|---|---|---|
| Bharatiya Janata Party | BJP | 47 | Pushkar Singh Dhami |
| Indian National Congress | INC | 20 | Yashpal Arya |
| Bahujan Samaj Party | BSP | 1 | Muhammad Shahzad |
| Independent | Ind. | 2 | N/A |
| Total | | 70 | |

== Members of Legislative Assembly ==
| District | No. | Constituency | Name | Party | Remarks |
|---|---|---|---|---|---|
| Uttarkashi | 1 | Purola (SC) | Durgeshwar Lal | Bharatiya Janata Party | |
| Uttarkashi | 2 | Yamunotri | Sanjay Dobhal | Independent | |
| Uttarkashi | 3 | Gangotri | Suresh Singh Chauhan | Bharatiya Janata Party | |
| Chamoli | 4 | Badrinath | Rajendra Singh Bhandari | Indian National Congress | Resigned on 17 March 2024 |
| Chamoli | 4 | Badrinath | Lakhpat Singh Butola | Indian National Congress | Elected on 13 July 2024 |
| Chamoli | 5 | Tharali (SC) | Bhupal Ram Tamta | Bharatiya Janata Party | |
| Chamoli | 6 | Karnaprayag | Anil Nautiyal | Bharatiya Janata Party | |
| Rudraprayag | 7 | Kedarnath | Shaila Rani Rawat | Bharatiya Janata Party | Died on 9 July 2024 |
| Rudraprayag | 7 | Kedarnath | Asha Nautiyal | Bharatiya Janata Party | Elected in November 2024 by-election |
| Rudraprayag | 8 | Rudraprayag | Bharat Singh Chaudhary | Bharatiya Janata Party | Cabinet Minister |
| Tehri Garhwal | 9 | Ghansali (SC) | Shakti Lal Shah | Bharatiya Janata Party | |
| Tehri Garhwal | 10 | Devprayag | Vinod Kandari | Bharatiya Janata Party | |
| Tehri Garhwal | 11 | Narendranagar | Subodh Uniyal | Bharatiya Janata Party | Cabinet Minister |
| Tehri Garhwal | 12 | Pratapnagar | Vikram Singh Negi | Indian National Congress | |
| Tehri Garhwal | 13 | Tehri | Kishore Upadhyaya | Bharatiya Janata Party | |
| Tehri Garhwal | 14 | Dhanaulti | Pritam Singh Panwar | Bharatiya Janata Party | |
| Dehradun | 15 | Chakrata (ST) | Pritam Singh | Indian National Congress | |
| Dehradun | 16 | Vikasnagar | Munna Singh Chauhan | Bharatiya Janata Party | |
| Dehradun | 17 | Sahaspur | Sahdev Singh Pundir | Bharatiya Janata Party | |
| Dehradun | 18 | Dharampur | Vinod Chamoli | Bharatiya Janata Party | |
| Dehradun | 19 | Raipur | Umesh Sharma 'Kau' | Bharatiya Janata Party | |
| Dehradun | 20 | Rajpur Road (SC) | Khajan Dass | Bharatiya Janata Party | Cabinet Minister |
| Dehradun | 21 | Dehradun Cantonment | Savita Kapoor | Bharatiya Janata Party | |
| Dehradun | 22 | Mussoorie | Ganesh Joshi | Bharatiya Janata Party | Cabinet Minister |
| Dehradun | 23 | Doiwala | Brij Bhushan Gairola | Bharatiya Janata Party | |
| Dehradun | 24 | Rishikesh | Premchand Aggarwal | Bharatiya Janata Party | Former Cabinet Minister |
| Haridwar | 25 | Haridwar | Madan Kaushik | Bharatiya Janata Party | Cabinet Minister |
| Haridwar | 26 | BHEL Ranipur | Adesh Chauhan | Bharatiya Janata Party | |
| Haridwar | 27 | Jwalapur (SC) | Ravi Bahadur | Indian National Congress | |
| Haridwar | 28 | Bhagwanpur (SC) | Mamta Rakesh | Indian National Congress | |
| Haridwar | 29 | Jhabrera (SC) | Virendra Kumar | Indian National Congress | |
| Haridwar | 30 | Piran Kaliyar | Furqan Ahmad | Indian National Congress | |
| Haridwar | 31 | Roorkee | Pradip Batra | Bharatiya Janata Party | Cabinet Minister |
| Haridwar | 32 | Khanpur | Umesh Kumar | Independent | |
| Haridwar | 33 | Manglaur | Sarwat Karim Ansari | Bahujan Samaj Party | Died on 30 October 2023 |
| Haridwar | 33 | Manglaur | Muhammad Nizamuddin | Indian National Congress | Elected on 13 July 2024 |
| Haridwar | 34 | Laksar | Muhammad Shahzad | Bahujan Samaj Party | |
| Haridwar | 35 | Haridwar Rural | Anupama Rawat | Indian National Congress | |
| Pauri Garhwal | 36 | Yamkeshwar | Renu Bisht | Bharatiya Janata Party | |
| Pauri Garhwal | 37 | Pauri (SC) | Rajkumar Pori | Bharatiya Janata Party | |
| Pauri Garhwal | 38 | Srinagar | Dhan Singh Rawat | Bharatiya Janata Party | Cabinet Minister |
| Pauri Garhwal | 39 | Chaubattakhal | Satpal Maharaj | Bharatiya Janata Party | Cabinet Minister |
| Pauri Garhwal | 40 | Lansdowne | Dilip Singh Rawat | Bharatiya Janata Party | |
| Pauri Garhwal | 41 | Kotdwar | Ritu Khanduri Bhushan | Bharatiya Janata Party | Speaker |
| Pithoragarh | 42 | Dharchula | Harish Singh Dhami | Indian National Congress | |
| Pithoragarh | 43 | Didihat | Bishan Singh Chuphal | Bharatiya Janata Party | |
| Pithoragarh | 44 | Pithoragarh | Mayukh Singh Mahar | Indian National Congress | |
| Pithoragarh | 45 | Gangolihat (SC) | Fakir Ram Tamta | Bharatiya Janata Party | |
| Bageshwar | 46 | Kapkot | Suresh Singh Garhia | Bharatiya Janata Party | |
| Bageshwar | 47 | Bageshwar (SC) | Chandan Ram Das | Bharatiya Janata Party | Died on 26 April 2023 |
| Bageshwar | 47 | Bageshwar (SC) | Parwati Das | Bharatiya Janata Party | Elected on 8 September 2023 |
| Almora | 48 | Dwarahat | Madan Singh Bisht | Indian National Congress | |
| Almora | 49 | Salt | Mahesh Singh Jeena | Bharatiya Janata Party | |
| Almora | 50 | Ranikhet | Pramod Nainwal | Bharatiya Janata Party | |
| Almora | 51 | Someshwar (SC) | Rekha Arya | Bharatiya Janata Party | Cabinet Minister |
| Almora | 52 | Almora | Manoj Tiwari | Indian National Congress | |
| Almora | 53 | Jageshwar | Mohan Singh Mahara | Bharatiya Janata Party | |
| Champawat | 54 | Lohaghat | Khushal Singh Adhikari | Indian National Congress | |
| Champawat | 55 | Champawat | Kailash Chandra Gahtori | Bharatiya Janata Party | Resigned on 21 April 2022 |
| Champawat | 55 | Champawat | Pushkar Singh Dhami | Bharatiya Janata Party | Elected on 3 June 2022 |
| Nainital | 56 | Lalkuan | Mohan Singh Bisht | Bharatiya Janata Party | |
| Nainital | 57 | Bhimtal | Ram Singh Kaira | Bharatiya Janata Party | Cabinet Minister |
| Nainital | 58 | Nainital (SC) | Sarita Arya | Bharatiya Janata Party | |
| Nainital | 59 | Haldwani | Sumit Hridayesh | Indian National Congress | |
| Nainital | 60 | Kaladhungi | Banshidhar Bhagat | Bharatiya Janata Party | |
| Nainital | 61 | Ramnagar | Diwan Singh Bisht | Bharatiya Janata Party | |
| Udham Singh Nagar | 62 | Jaspur | Adesh Singh Chauhan | Indian National Congress | |
| Udham Singh Nagar | 63 | Kashipur | Trilok Singh Cheema | Bharatiya Janata Party | |
| Udham Singh Nagar | 64 | Bajpur (SC) | Yashpal Arya | Indian National Congress | Leader of Opposition |
| Udham Singh Nagar | 65 | Gadarpur | Arvind Pandey | Bharatiya Janata Party | |
| Udham Singh Nagar | 66 | Rudrapur | Shiv Arora | Bharatiya Janata Party | |
| Udham Singh Nagar | 67 | Kichha | Tilak Raj Behar | Indian National Congress | |
| Udham Singh Nagar | 68 | Sitarganj | Saurabh Bahuguna | Bharatiya Janata Party | Cabinet Minister |
| Udham Singh Nagar | 69 | Nanakmatta (ST) | Gopal Singh Rana | Indian National Congress | |
| Udham Singh Nagar | 70 | Khatima | Bhuwan Chandra Kapri | Indian National Congress | Deputy Leader of Opposition |

=== By-elections ===
| S. No. | Constituency | Elected Member | Party affiliation |
|---|---|---|---|
| 55 | Champawat | Pushkar Singh Dhami | BJP |
| 47 | Bageshwar | Parwati Das | BJP |
| 4 | Badrinath | Lakhpat Singh Butola | INC |
| 33 | Manglaur | Muhammad Nizamuddin | INC |
| 7 | Kedarnath | Asha Nautiyal | BJP |

== See also ==
- Government of Uttarakhand
- Governor of Uttarakhand
- Chief Minister of Uttarakhand
- Speaker of the Uttarakhand Legislative Assembly
- Leader of the Opposition in the Uttarakhand Legislative Assembly
- Cabinet of Uttarakhand
- List of constituencies of the Uttarakhand Legislative Assembly
- List of former constituencies of the Uttarakhand Legislative Assembly
- List of by-elections to the Uttarakhand Legislative Assembly
- Lok Sabha
- Rajya Sabha
- State Legislature
- State Legislative Assemblies
- State Legislative Councils

== Notes ==
- ^{A} In the 2012 Assembly election, Uttarakhand Kranti Dal contested as "Uttarakhand Kranti Dal (P)" led by then party president Trivendra Singh Panwar. The original party name and the election symbol (chair) was frozen by the Election Commission of India following the factionism and leadership dispute within the party that led to its break-up. Its original name and party symbol were restored in 2017.
