= 2027 Uttarakhand Legislative Assembly election =

Elections for the 6th Legislative assembly of Uttarakhand

- By February 2027

All 70 seats in the Uttarakhand Legislative Assembly 36 seats needed for a majority
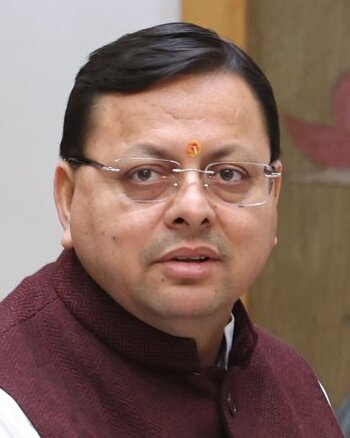

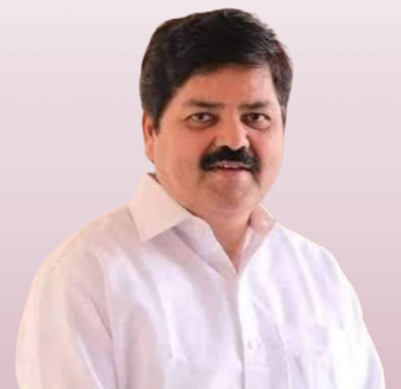
Leader	Pushkar Singh Dhami	Ganesh Godiyal
Party	BJP	INC
Leader since	2021	2025
Leader's seat	Champawat; Khatima	Srinagar
Last election	44.30%, 47 seats	37.9%, 19 seats
Current seats	47	20
Seats needed	Steady	▲16
- Map of the assembly constituencies in Uttarakhand
Incumbent Chief Minister
Pushkar Singh Dhami
BJP

Legislative assembly elections are expected to be held in Uttarakhand in February 2027 to elect all 70 members of the Uttarakhand Legislative Assembly. Pushkar Singh Dhami is the incumbent Chief Minister of Uttarakhand.

== Schedule ==
Poll Event	Schedule
Notification Date	TBD
Last Date for filing nomination	TBD
Scrutiny of nomination	TBD
Last Date for Withdrawal of nomination	TBD
Date of Poll	TBD
Date of Counting of Votes	TBD

== Parties and Alliances ==
Party/Alliance		Flag	Symbol	Leader	Seats contested
Bharatiya Janata Party				Pushkar Singh Dhami	TBD
INDIA	Indian National Congress			Ganesh Godiyal	TBD
INDIA	Samajwadi Party			Abdul Mateen Siddiqui	TBD
Bahujan Samaj Party				Naresh Gautam	70
Aam Aadmi Party				TBA	TBD
Uttarakhand Kranti Dal				Surendra Kukreti	TBD
Azad Samaj Party (Kanshi Ram)				TBD	TBD
Communist Party of India (Marxist)				Rajendra Purohit	TBD
Communist Party of India				Jagdish Kuliyal	TBD
All India Majlis-e-Ittehadul Muslimeen				Nayyar Kazmi	TBD
Communist Party of India (Marxist–Leninist) Liberation				Indresh Maikhuri	TBD

== Candidates ==
District	Constituency						
District	Constituency		BJP		INDIA		UKD
Uttarkashi	1	Purola (SC)	BJP		INC		
Uttarkashi	2	Yamunotri	BJP		INC		
Uttarkashi	3	Gangotri	BJP		INC		
Chamoli	4	Badrinath	BJP		INC	Lakhpat Singh Butola	
Chamoli	5	Tharali (SC)	BJP		INC		
Chamoli	6	Karnaprayag	BJP		INC		
Rudraprayag	7	Kedarnath	BJP		INC		
Rudraprayag	8	Rudraprayag	BJP		INC		
Tehri Garhwal	9	Ghansali (SC)	BJP		INC		
Tehri Garhwal	10	Devprayag	BJP		INC		
Tehri Garhwal	11	Narendranagar	BJP		INC	Om Gopal Rawat	
Tehri Garhwal	12	Pratapnagar	BJP		INC	Vikram Singh Negi	
Tehri Garhwal	13	Tehri	BJP		INC		
Tehri Garhwal	14	Dhanaulti	BJP		INC		
Dehradun	15	Chakrata (ST)	BJP		INC	Pritam Singh	
Dehradun	16	Vikasnagar	BJP		INC		
Dehradun	17	Sahaspur	BJP		INC		
Dehradun	18	Dharampur	BJP		INC		
Dehradun	19	Raipur	BJP		INC		
Dehradun	20	Rajpur Road (SC)	BJP		INC		
Dehradun	21	Dehradun Cantonment	BJP		INC		
Dehradun	22	Mussoorie	BJP		INC		
Dehradun	23	Doiwala	BJP		INC		
Dehradun	24	Rishikesh	BJP		INC		
Haridwar	25	Haridwar	BJP		INC		
Haridwar	26	BHEL Ranipur	BJP		INC		
Haridwar	27	Jwalapur (SC)	BJP		INC	Ravi Bahadur	
Haridwar	28	Bhagwanpur (SC)	BJP		INC	Mamta Rakesh	
Haridwar	29	Jhabrera (SC)	BJP		INC	Virendra Kumar	
Haridwar	30	Piran Kaliyar	BJP		INC	Haji Furkan Ahmad	
Haridwar	31	Roorkee	BJP		INC		
Haridwar	32	Khanpur	BJP		INC		
Haridwar	33	Manglaur	BJP		INC	Qazi Nizamuddin	
Haridwar	34	Laksar	BJP		INC		
Haridwar	35	Haridwar Rural	BJP		INC	Anupama Rawat	
Pauri Garhwal	36	Yamkeshwar	BJP		INC		
Pauri Garhwal	37	Pauri (SC)	BJP		INC		
Pauri Garhwal	38	Srinagar	BJP		INC	Ganesh Godiyal	
Pauri Garhwal	39	Chaubattakhal	BJP		INC		
Pauri Garhwal	40	Lansdowne	BJP		INC		
Pauri Garhwal	41	Kotdwar	BJP		INC	Surendra Singh Negi	
Pithoragarh	42	Dharchula	BJP		INC	Harish Singh Dhami	
Pithoragarh	43	Didihat	BJP		INC		
Pithoragarh	44	Pithoragarh	BJP		INC	Mayukh Mahar	
Pithoragarh	45	Gangolihat (SC)	BJP		INC		
Bageshwar	46	Kapkot	BJP		INC	Lalit Farswan	
Bageshwar	47	Bageshwar (SC)	BJP		INC	Basant Kumar	
Almora	48	Dwarahat	BJP		INC	Madan Singh Bisht	
Almora	49	Salt	BJP		INC		
Almora	50	Ranikhet	BJP		INC		
Almora	51	Someshwar (SC)	BJP		INC		
Almora	52	Almora	BJP		INC	Monoj Tiwari	
Almora	53	Jageshwar	BJP		INC		
Champawat	54	Lohaghat	BJP		INC	Khushal Singh Adhikari	
Champawat	55	Champawat	BJP	Pushkar Singh Dhami	INC		
Nainital	56	Lalkuan	BJP		INC		
Nainital	57	Bhimtal	BJP		INC		
Nainital	58	Nainital (SC)	BJP		INC	Sanjeev Arya	
Nainital	59	Haldwani	BJP		INC	Sumit Hridayesh	
Nainital	60	Kaladhungi	BJP		INC		
Nainital	61	Ramnagar	BJP		INC		
Udham Singh Nagar	62	Jaspur	BJP		INC	Aadesh Chauhan	
Udham Singh Nagar	63	Kashipur	BJP		INC		
Udham Singh Nagar	64	Bajpur (SC)	BJP		INC	Yashpal Arya	
Udham Singh Nagar	65	Gadarpur	BJP		INC		
Udham Singh Nagar	66	Rudrapur	BJP		INC	Rajkumar Thukral	
Udham Singh Nagar	67	Kichha	BJP		INC	Tilak Raj Behar	
Udham Singh Nagar	68	Sitarganj	BJP		INC		
Udham Singh Nagar	69	Nanakmatta (ST)	BJP		INC		
Udham Singh Nagar	70	Khatima	BJP		INC	Bhuwan Kapri	

== Surveys and polls ==
=== Opinion polls ===
Seat Projections
Polling agency	Date published	Sample size	Margin of Error				Lead	Ref
Polling agency	Date published	Sample size	Margin of Error	BJP	INC	Others	Lead	Ref
Tehelka Digital	27 September 2026	—	—	29	38	3	9	
DeKoder	22 November 2026	–	–	22	46	2	24	
Inside Election	10 September 2026	—	—	31	37	2	6	
Times Now Navbharat	13 September 2026	—	—	54	14	2	40	
Poll Mitra	25 July 2026	—	—	28–32	38–40	0–4	6–12	

Vote Share Projections
Polling agency	Date published	Sample size	Margin of Error				Lead	Ref
Polling agency	Date published	Sample size	Margin of Error	BJP	INC	Others	Lead	Ref
Times Now Navbharat	13 September 2026	—	—	42.06%	33.39%	24.55%	8.67%	
Vote Vibe	25 August 2026	—	—	40.9%	36.7%	12.9%	4.2%	
Poll Mitra	25 July 2026	—	—	41.0%–42.5%	43.0%–44.5%	13.0%–15.0%	1.0%–3.5%	

=== Exit polls ===
Polling agency	Date published	Sample size	Margin of Error				Lead
Polling agency	Date published	Sample size	Margin of Error	BJP	INC	Others	Lead
To be published after the conclusion of voting

== Results ==
=== Results by alliance or party ===
Alliance/ Party	Popular vote			Seats		
Alliance/ Party	Votes	%	±pp	Contested	Won	+/−
Bharatiya Janata Party						
Indian National Congress						
Bahujan Samaj Party				70		
Uttarakhand Kranti Dal						
Other parties						
Independents						
NOTA						
Total		100%	—		70	—

=== Results by division ===
Division	Seats			
Division	Seats	BJP	INC	BSP
Garhwal	41			
Kumaon	29			
Total	70			

=== Results by district ===
District	Seats			
District	Seats	BJP	INC	BSP
Uttarkashi	3			
Chamoli	3			
Rudraprayag	2			
Tehri Garhwal	6			
Dehradun	10			
Haridwar	11			
Pauri Garhwal	6			
Pithoragarh	4			
Bageshwar	2			
Almora	6			
Champawat	2			
Nainital	6			
Udham Singh Nagar	9			
Total	70			

=== Results by constituency ===
District	Constituency		Winner				Runner Up				Margin
District	No.	Name	Candidate	Party	Votes	%	Candidate	Party	Votes	%	Margin
Uttarkashi	1	Purola (SC)									
Uttarkashi	2	Yamunotri									
Uttarkashi	3	Gangotri									
Chamoli	4	Badrinath									
Chamoli	5	Tharali (SC)									
Chamoli	6	Karnaprayag									
Rudraprayag	7	Kedarnath									
Rudraprayag	8	Rudraprayag									
Tehri Garhwal	9	Ghansali (SC)									
Tehri Garhwal	10	Devprayag									
Tehri Garhwal	11	Narendranagar									
Tehri Garhwal	12	Pratapnagar									
Tehri Garhwal	13	Tehri									
Tehri Garhwal	14	Dhanaulti									
Dehradun	15	Chakrata (ST)									
Dehradun	16	Vikasnagar									
Dehradun	17	Sahaspur									
Dehradun	18	Dharampur									
Dehradun	19	Raipur									
Dehradun	20	Rajpur Road (SC)									
Dehradun	21	Dehradun Cantonment									
Dehradun	22	Mussoorie									
Dehradun	23	Doiwala									
Dehradun	24	Rishikesh									
Haridwar	25	Haridwar									
Haridwar	26	BHEL Ranipur									
Haridwar	27	Jwalapur (SC)									
Haridwar	28	Bhagwanpur (SC)									
Haridwar	29	Jhabrera (SC)									
Haridwar	30	Piran Kaliyar									
Haridwar	31	Roorkee									
Haridwar	32	Khanpur									
Haridwar	33	Manglaur									
Haridwar	34	Laksar									
Haridwar	35	Haridwar Rural									
Pauri Garhwal	36	Yamkeshwar									
Pauri Garhwal	37	Pauri (SC)									
Pauri Garhwal	38	Srinagar									
Pauri Garhwal	39	Chaubattakhal									
Pauri Garhwal	40	Lansdowne									
Pauri Garhwal	41	Kotdwar									
Pithoragarh	42	Dharchula									
Pithoragarh	43	Didihat									
Pithoragarh	44	Pithoragarh									
Pithoragarh	45	Gangolihat (SC)									
Bageshwar	46	Kapkot									
Bageshwar	47	Bageshwar (SC)									
Almora	48	Dwarahat									
Almora	49	Salt									
Almora	50	Ranikhet									
Almora	51	Someshwar (SC)									
Almora	52	Almora									
Almora	53	Jageshwar									
Champawat	54	Lohaghat									
Champawat	55	Champawat									
Nainital	56	Lalkuan									
Nainital	57	Bhimtal									
Nainital	58	Nainital (SC)									
Nainital	59	Haldwani									
Nainital	60	Kaladhungi									
Nainital	61	Ramnagar									
Udham Singh Nagar	62	Jaspur									
Udham Singh Nagar	63	Kashipur									
Udham Singh Nagar	64	Bajpur (SC)									
Udham Singh Nagar	65	Gadarpur									
Udham Singh Nagar	66	Rudrapur									
Udham Singh Nagar	67	Kichha									
Udham Singh Nagar	68	Sitarganj									
Udham Singh Nagar	69	Nanakmatta (ST)									
Udham Singh Nagar	70	Khatima									

== See also ==
- Elections in Uttarakhand
- Politics of Uttarakhand
