= Mukteshwar Assembly constituency =

Former constituency of the Uttarakhand Assembly, in India

Coordinates: 29.47°N 79.65°E

Mukteshwar
- Former constituency for the Uttarakhand Legislative Assembly

Constituency details
- Country: India
- Region: North India
- State: Uttarakhand
- District: Nainital
- Established: 2002
- Abolished: 2012
- Reservation: SC

Mukteshwar Legislative Assembly constituency was one of the seventy electoral Uttarakhand Legislative Assembly constituencies of Uttarakhand state in India. It was abolished in 2012 following the delimitation.

Mukteshwar Legislative Assembly constituency was a part of Nainital–Udhamsingh Nagar (Lok Sabha constituency).

== Members of Legislative Assembly ==
Year	Name	Party
2002	Yashpal Arya	Indian National Congress
2007	Yashpal Arya	Indian National Congress

== Election results ==
=== Assembly Election 2007 ===
2007 Uttarakhand Legislative Assembly election: Mukteshwar
Party	Candidate	Votes	%	±%
INC	Yashpal Arya	26,801	58.24%	▲20.54
BJP	Shri Chand	15,817	34.37%	▲0.64
BSP	Harish Kumar	2,396	5.21%	▼10.45
UKD	Ram Lal Arya	1,001	2.18%	▼1.67
Margin of victory		10,984	23.87%	▲19.90
Turnout		46,015	65.07%	▲12.62
Registered electors		70,796		▲3.32
INC hold		Swing	▲20.54	

=== Assembly Election 2002 ===
2002 Uttaranchal Legislative Assembly election: Mukteshwar
Party	Candidate	Votes	%	±%
INC	Yashpal Arya	13,531	37.70%	New
BJP	Shri Chand	12,107	33.74%	New
BSP	Prakash Chandra	5,618	15.65%	New
UKD	Jagdish Chandra Chaudhari	1,381	3.85%	New
Independent	Harish Chandra Alias Karobar	1,108	3.09%	New
Independent	Bahadur Ram	826	2.30%	New
SP	Govind Ram Gautam	789	2.20%	New
LJP	Pushpa Arya	527	1.47%	New
Margin of victory		1,424	3.97%	
Turnout		35,887	52.45%	
Registered electors		68,518		
INC win (new seat)				

== See also ==
- Bhimtal (Uttarakhand Assembly constituency)
