= Yashpal Arya =

Indian politician

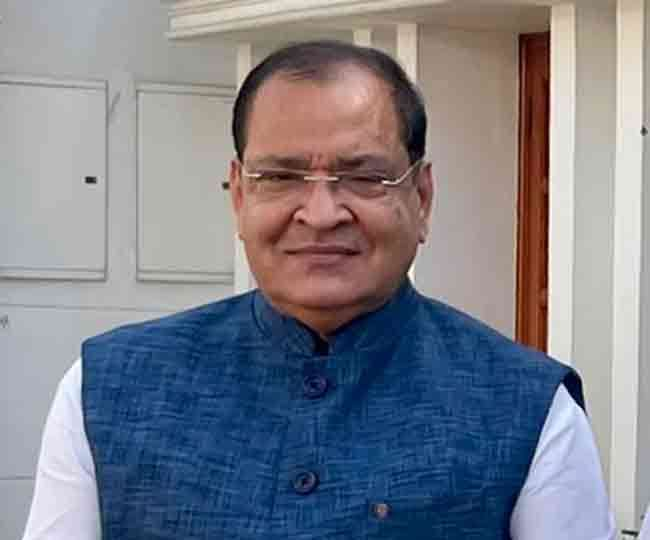

7th Leader of the Opposition Uttarakhand Legislative Assembly
- Incumbent
- Assumed office 10 April 2022
- Deputy: Bhuwan Chandra Kapri
- Chief Minister: Pushkar Dhami
- Preceded by: Pritam Singh

Member of Legislative Assembly, Uttarakhand
- Incumbent
- Assumed office 2012
- Preceded by: Arvind Pandey
- Constituency: Bajpur
- In office 2002–2012
- Preceded by: Constituency established
- Succeeded by: Constituency abolished
- Constituency: Mukteshwar

Speaker of Uttarakhand Legislative Assembly
- In office 2002 - 2007
- Preceded by: Prakash Pant
- Succeeded by: Harbans Kapoor

Member of Legislative Assembly, Uttar Pradesh
- In office 1993–1996
- In office 1989–1991
- Constituency: Khatima

Personal details
- Born: 8 January 1952 (age 74)
- Party: Indian National Congress (until 2017, 2021–present)
- Other political affiliations: Bharatiya Janata Party (2017–2021)
- Children: Sanjeev Arya

Yashpal Arya is a 7-time MLA from Uttar Pradesh (twice) and Uttarakhand (five times) combined. He is a former Minister of Transportation, Social Welfare, Minority and Students' Welfare in the Government of Uttarakhand under Bharatiya Janata Party's rule. He is currently the 7th Leader of the opposition in the Uttarakhand Legislative Assembly. Currently, he is an Indian National Congress leader and member of the Uttarakhand Legislative Assembly. He is a former Speaker of the Uttarakhand Legislative Assembly under Indian National Congress' rule. He was elected from Mukteshwar constituency in the 2007 Uttarakhand state assembly elections.

He was the President of the Congress Party's Uttarakhand Pradesh Congress Committee (Uttarakhand PCC) from 2007 through 2014. He was elected from Bajpur Assembly constituency in 2012 and was being thought to be one of the frontrunners for the chief ministerial candidature until the Congress high command chose Vijay Bahuguna, son of former Uttar Pradesh CM late Hemvati Nandan Bahuguna, for the post.

On 16 January 2017, Arya joined the Bharatiya Janata Party where he served as the Cabinet Minister of Transportation, Social Welfare, Minority and Students' Welfare, Government of Uttarakhand from 18 March 2017 to 11 October 2021 in the Trivendra Singh Rawat's, Tirath Singh Rawat's and Pushkar Singh Dhami's first cabinet.

On 11 October 2021, Arya along with his son Sanjiv Arya (MLA, Nainital) returned to Congress. In the 2022 Uttarakhand Assembly Elections, he won the Bajpur seat again but this time as an INC candidate, after which he was appointed the Leader of Opposition in the Uttarakhand Legislative Assembly.

== Positions held ==
Year	Description
1984 - 1989	Gram Pradhan - Chhalayal Suyal Gram Panchayat, Haldwani
1989 - 1991	Elected to 10th Uttar Pradesh Assembly
1993 - 1996	Elected to 12th Uttar Pradesh Assembly (2nd term)
2002 - 2007	Elected to 1st Uttarakhand Assembly (3rd term): Speaker - Uttaranchal Legislative Assembly
2007 - 2012	Elected to 2nd Uttarakhand Assembly (4th term): Member, Committee on Government Assurances (2009 – 12); Member, Committee on Housing (2010 – 12)
2012 - 2017	Elected to 3rd Uttarakhand Assembly (5th term): Cabinet Minister for Revenue and Land Management, Irrigation, Flood Control, Co-operatives, Technical Education, Rural Engineering Services, Rural Roads and Drainage, Indo-Nepal-Uttarakhand River Projects
2017 - 2022	Elected to 4th Uttarakhand Assembly (6th term): Cabinet Minister for Transportation, Social Welfare, Minority Welfare, Students Welfare, Rural Water Reservoirs Development, Remote Areas Development, Sub-Divisional Development and Management, Backward Areas Development
2022 - Till Date	Elected to 5th Uttarakhand Assembly (7th term): Leader of Opposition - Uttarakhand Legislative Assembly

=== Within Party ===
Year	Description
1979 - 1983	Block President, Nainital Youth Congress
1983 - 1984	District General Secretary, Nainital Youth Congress
1984 - 1989	District President, Nainital Youth Congress
1996 - 2000	President, Udham Singh Nagar District Congress Committee
2007 - 2014	President, Uttarakhand Pradesh Congress Committee

== Electoral performance ==
Year	Election	Party	Constituency Name	Result	Votes gained	Vote share%	Margin	Ref
1989	10th UP Assembly	INC	Khatima	Won	38,785	40.42%	14,793	
1991	11th UP Assembly	INC	Khatima	Lost	29,211	32.11%	1,755	
1993	12th UP Assembly	INC	Khatima	Won	49,487	42.01%	8,787	
1996	13th UP Assembly	AIIC(T)	Khatima	Lost	35,120	21.46%	21,329	
2002	1st Uttarakhand Assembly	INC	Mukteshwar	Won	13,531	37.70%	1,424	
2007	2nd Uttarakhand Assembly	INC	Mukteshwar	Won	26,801	58.24%	10,984	
2012	3rd Uttarakhand Assembly	INC	Bajpur	Won	38524	45.94%	15,131	
2017	4th Uttarakhand Assembly	BJP	Bajpur	Won	54,965	53.22%	12,636	
2022	5th Uttarakhand Assembly	INC	Bajpur	Won	40,252	36.76%	1,611	

Party political offices
Preceded by Harish Rawat	President; Uttarakhand Pradesh Congress Committee; 2007 – 13 June 2014	Succeeded by Kishore Upadhyaya
