= Dehradun Cantonment Assembly constituency =

Constituency of the Uttarakhand legislative assembly in India

Coordinates: 30.353°N 78.029°E

Dehradun Cantonment
- Constituency No. 21 for the Uttarakhand Legislative Assembly

Constituency details
- Country: India
- Region: North India
- State: Uttarakhand
- District: Dehradun
- Lok Sabha constituency: Tehri Garhwal
- Total electors: 134,911
- Reservation: None

Member of Legislative Assembly
- 5th Uttarakhand Legislative Assembly
- Incumbent Savita Kapoor
- Party: Bharatiya Janata Party
- Elected year: 2022

Dehradun Cantonment (Dehradun Cantt) is one of the seventy electoral Uttarakhand Legislative Assembly constituencies of Uttarakhand state in India. This seat is previously known as Dehradun Constituency before 2012 Delimitation.

The constituency is a part of Tehri Garhwal (Lok Sabha constituency). It includes 15 wards of Dehradun Municipal Corporation and Dehradun Cantonment area.

== Dehradun Municipal Corporation Wards ==
- Kaulagarh
- Ballupur
- Yamuna Colony
- Govindgarh
- Sridev Suman Nagar
- Vijay Park
- Vasant Vihar
- Panditwari
- Indira Nagar
- Seemadwar
- Indirapuram
- Kanwali
- Dronpuri
- Patel Nagar West
- Gandhi Gram

== Members of Legislative Assembly ==
Election	Name	Portrait	Party
2012	Harbans Kapoor		Bharatiya Janata Party
2017	Harbans Kapoor		Bharatiya Janata Party
2022	Savita Kapoor		Bharatiya Janata Party

== Election results ==
=== 2027 Assembly election ===
2027 Uttarakhand Legislative Assembly election: Dehradun Cantonment
Party	Candidate	Votes	%	±%
INC	TBA			
BJP	TBA			
AAP	Naveen Bisht			
UKD	Comdt (Retd) Rajendra Singh Negi			
NOTA	None of the above			
Majority				
Turnout				
gain from		Swing		

=== Assembly Election 2022 ===
2022 Uttarakhand Legislative Assembly election: Dehradun Cantonment
Party	Candidate	Votes	%	±%
BJP	Savita Kapoor	45,492	59.16%	▲2.75
INC	Suryakant Dhasmana	24,554	31.93%	▼1.62
AAP	Ravinder Singh Anand	3,265	4.25%	New
Independent	Dinesh Rawat	1,056	1.37%	New
UKD	Anirudh Kala	813	1.06%	New
NOTA	Nota	614	0.80%	▼0.08
BSP	Jaspal Singh	426	0.55%	▼0.55
Margin of victory		20,938	27.23%	▲4.37
Turnout		76,892	56.72%	▼0.42
Registered electors		1,35,555		▲6.22
BJP hold		Swing	▲2.75	

=== Assembly Election 2017 ===
2017 Uttarakhand Legislative Assembly election: Dehradun Cantonment
Party	Candidate	Votes	%	±%
BJP	Harbans Kapoor	41,142	56.41%	▲9.26
INC	Suryakant Dhasmana	24,472	33.56%	▼5.51
Independent	Anoop Nautiyal	3,285	4.50%	New
Independent	Naveen Bisht	1,303	1.79%	New
BSP	Devendra Kumar	802	1.10%	▼1.39
NOTA	None of the Above	641	0.88%	New
Margin of victory		16,670	22.86%	▲14.77
Turnout		72,928	57.14%	▼4.40
Registered electors		1,27,622		▲24.63
BJP hold		Swing	▲9.26	

=== Assembly Election 2012 ===
2012 Uttarakhand Legislative Assembly election: Dehradun Cantonment
Party	Candidate	Votes	%	±%
BJP	Harbans Kapoor	29,719	47.15%	New
INC	Devendra Singh Sethi	24,624	39.07%	New
URM	Rajendra Pant	3,391	5.38%	New
BSP	Noopur Gupta	1,570	2.49%	New
Independent	Adesh Garg	1,118	1.77%	New
Independent	Jyotsna	567	0.90%	New
AITC	Bijendar Singh Thapa	367	0.58%	New
Margin of victory		5,095	8.08%	
Turnout		63,025	61.55%	
Registered electors		1,02,402		
BJP win (new seat)				

== See also ==
- Dehradun Cantonment
- Dehradun (Uttarakhand Assembly constituency)
