= Kaladhungi Assembly constituency =

Constituency of the Uttarakhand legislative assembly in India

Coordinates: 29.28°N 79.35°E

Kaladhungi
- Constituency No. 60 for the Uttarakhand Legislative Assembly

Constituency details
- Country: India
- Region: North India
- State: Uttarakhand
- District: Nainital
- Lok Sabha constituency: Nainital–Udhamsingh Nagar
- Total electors: 171,639
- Reservation: None

Member of Legislative Assembly
- 5th Uttarakhand Legislative Assembly
- Incumbent Banshidhar Bhagat
- Party: Bharatiya Janata Party
- Elected year: 2022

Kaladhungi is one of the 70 Legislative Assembly constituencies of Uttarakhand state in India.

It includes the Kaladhungi and Kotabagh area as well as wards 34 to 55 in the Haldwani Municipal Corporation.

It is part of Nainital district.

== Members of the Legislative Assembly ==
Election	Member	Party
2012	Banshidhar Bhagat	Bharatiya Janata Party
2017	Banshidhar Bhagat	Bharatiya Janata Party
2022	Banshidhar Bhagat	Bharatiya Janata Party

== Election results ==
=== 2027 Assembly election ===
2027 Uttarakhand Legislative Assembly election: Khaladhungi
Party	Candidate	Votes	%	±%
INC				
BJP				
NOTA	None of the above			
Majority				
Turnout				
gain from		Swing		

=== Assembly Election 2022 ===
2022 Uttarakhand Legislative Assembly election: Kaladhungi
Party	Candidate	Votes	%	±%
BJP	Banshidhar Bhagat	67,847	57.34%	▲12.58
INC	Mahesh Chandra	43,916	37.12%	▲12.53
AAP	Manju Tiwari	1,825	1.54%	New
NOTA	None of the above	1,436	1.21%	▲0.12
BSP	Sunder Lal Arya	1,434	1.21%	▼1.12
Margin of victory		23,931	20.23%	▲0.05
Turnout		1,18,316	68.31%	▼0.48
Registered electors		1,73,201		▲16.69
BJP hold		Swing	▲12.58	

=== Assembly Election 2017 ===
2017 Uttarakhand Legislative Assembly election: Kaladhungi
Party	Candidate	Votes	%	±%
BJP	Banshidhar Bhagat	45,704	44.76%	▲15.87
INC	Prakash Joshi	25,107	24.59%	▼1.29
Independent	Mahesh Chandra	20,214	19.80%	New
Independent	Harendra Singh Darmwal	4,294	4.21%	New
BSP	Varun Pratap Singh Bhakuni	2,384	2.33%	▼9.90
NOTA	None of the above	1,119	1.10%	New
Independent	Mahendra Kumar Chaudhary	1,097	1.07%	New
UKD	Dr. Suresh Dalakoti	889	0.87%	▼2.74
UKPP	Surendra Singh Nigaltiya	625	0.61%	New
Margin of victory		20,597	20.17%	▲17.16
Turnout		1,02,104	68.79%	▼0.68
Registered electors		1,48,431		▲30.98
BJP hold		Swing	▲15.87	

=== Assembly Election 2012 ===
2012 Uttarakhand Legislative Assembly election: Kaladhungi
Party	Candidate	Votes	%	±%
BJP	Banshidhar Bhagat	22,744	28.89%	New
INC	Prakash Joshi	20,374	25.88%	New
Independent	Mahesh Sharma	11,809	15.00%	New
BSP	Diwan Singh	9,636	12.24%	New
Independent	Bhoopendra Singh "Bhai Ji"	8,925	11.34%	New
UKD	Narayan Singh Jantawal	2,843	3.61%	New
Independent	Veer Singh	746	0.95%	New
URM	Surendra Singh Nigaltiya	625	0.79%	New
Independent	Janardan Pant	395	0.50%	New
Margin of victory		2,370	3.01%	
Turnout		78,730	69.47%	
Registered electors		1,13,325		
BJP win (new seat)				

== See also ==
- List of constituencies of the Uttarakhand Legislative Assembly
- Nainital district
