= Piran Kaliyar Assembly constituency =

Constituency of the Uttarakhand legislative assembly in India

Coordinates: 29.92°N 77.94°E

Piran Kaliyar
- Constituency No. 30 for the Uttarakhand Legislative Assembly

Constituency details
- Country: India
- Region: North India
- State: Uttarakhand
- District: Haridwar
- Lok Sabha constituency: Haridwar
- Total electors: 127,118 (2022)
- Reservation: None

Member of Legislative Assembly
- 5th Uttarakhand Legislative Assembly
- Incumbent Furqan Ahmad
- Party: Indian National Congress
- Elected year: 2022

Piran Kaliyar Legislative Assembly constituency is one of the seventy electoral Uttarakhand Legislative Assembly constituencies of Uttarakhand state in India. It includes Piran Kaliyar area of Haridwar District.

Piran Kaliyar Legislative Assembly constituency is a part of Haridwar (Lok Sabha constituency). The constituency also covers 11 wards of the Roorkee Municipal Corporation.

== Members of the Legislative Assembly ==
Election	Member	Party
2012	Furqan Ahmad	Indian National Congress
2017	Furqan Ahmad	Indian National Congress
2022	Furqan Ahmad	Indian National Congress

== Election results ==
=== 2027 Assembly election ===
2027 Uttarakhand Legislative Assembly election: Piran Kaliyar
Party	Candidate	Votes	%	±%
INC				
BJP				
NOTA	None of the above			
Majority				
Turnout				
gain from		Swing		

=== Assembly Election 2022 ===
2022 Uttarakhand Legislative Assembly election: Piran Kaliyar
Party	Candidate	Votes	%	±%
INC	Furqan Ahmad	43,539	44.16%	▲11.89
BJP	Munish Kumar Saini	27,796	28.19%	▼2.59
BSP	Surendra Singh	11,716	11.88%	▲5.05
ASP(KR)	Abdul Wahid	11,441	11.60%	New
AAP	Sadab Alam	2,423	2.46%	New
Independent	Md Shahjad	520	0.53%	New
NOTA	None of the above	470	0.48%	▲0.09
Margin of victory		15,743	15.97%	▲14.48
Turnout		98,594	77.47%	▼4.13
Registered electors		1,27,274		▲14.60
INC hold		Swing	▲11.89	

=== Assembly Election 2017 ===
2017 Uttarakhand Legislative Assembly election: Piran Kaliyar
Party	Candidate	Votes	%	±%
INC	Furqan Ahmad	29,243	32.27%	▼2.75
BJP	Jaibhagwan	27,894	30.78%	▲1.47
Independent	Shazad	23,843	26.31%	New
BSP	Rao Sajid	6,188	6.83%	▼25.56
Independent	Netra Pal	1,367	1.51%	New
Independent	Moti Lal Maurya	519	0.57%	New
NOTA	None of the above	350	0.39%	New
Margin of victory		1,349	1.49%	▼1.14
Turnout		90,619	81.60%	▲1.25
Registered electors		1,11,058		▲20.80
INC hold		Swing	▼2.75	

=== Assembly Election 2012 ===
2012 Uttarakhand Legislative Assembly election: Piran Kaliyar
Party	Candidate	Votes	%	±%
INC	Furqan Ahmad	25,870	35.02%	New
BSP	Shahzad	23,926	32.39%	New
BJP	Shyambeer	21,648	29.31%	New
Independent	Rao Irshad	442	0.60%	New
Margin of victory		1,944	2.63%	
Turnout		73,867	80.35%	
Registered electors		91,933		
INC win (new seat)				

== See also ==
- Kaliyar Sharif
- Iqbalpur (Uttarakhand Assembly constituency)
