= Nanakmatta Assembly constituency =

Constituency of the Uttarakhand legislative assembly in India

Coordinates: 28.94°N 79.81°E

Nanakmatta
- Constituency No. 69 for the Uttarakhand Legislative Assembly

Constituency details
- Country: India
- Region: North India
- State: Uttarakhand
- District: Udham Singh Nagar
- Lok Sabha constituency: Nainital–Udhamsingh Nagar
- Total electors: 123,694
- Reservation: ST

Member of Legislative Assembly
- 5th Uttarakhand Legislative Assembly
- Incumbent Gopal Singh Rana
- Party: Indian National Congress
- Elected year: 2022

Nanakmatta is one of the 70 Legislative Assembly constituencies of Uttarakhand state in India. It was formed in 2012 after being split from Khatima Constituency.

It is part of Udham Singh Nagar district and is reserved for candidates belonging to the Scheduled tribes.

== Members of the Legislative Assembly ==
Year	Member	Party
2012	Dr. Prem Singh Rana	Bharatiya Janata Party
2017	Dr. Prem Singh Rana	Bharatiya Janata Party
2022	Gopal Singh Rana	Indian National Congress

== Election results ==
=== 2027 Assembly election ===
2027 Uttarakhand Legislative Assembly election: Nanakmatta
Party	Candidate	Votes	%	±%
INC				
BJP				
NOTA	None of the above			
Majority				
Turnout				
gain from		Swing		

=== Assembly Election 2022 ===
2022 Uttarakhand Legislative Assembly election: Nanakmatta
Party	Candidate	Votes	%	±%
INC	Gopal Singh Rana	48,746	52.94%	▲12.80
BJP	Prem Singh Rana	35,726	38.80%	▼12.85
AAP	Anand Singh Rana	3,085	3.35%	New
Independent	Mukesh Singh	1,660	1.80%	New
BSP	Vijay Singh Rana	1,504	1.63%	▼2.20
NOTA	None of the above	962	1.04%	▲0.07
Margin of victory		13,020	14.14%	▲2.64
Turnout		92,075	74.15%	▼2.19
Registered electors		1,24,169		▲14.43
INC gain from BJP		Swing	▼1.29	

=== Assembly Election 2017 ===
2017 Uttarakhand Legislative Assembly election: Nanakmatta
Party	Candidate	Votes	%	±%
BJP	Dr. Prem Singh Rana	42,785	51.65%	▲12.10
INC	Gopal Singh Rana	33,254	40.14%	▲8.95
BSP	Shish Ram Rana	3,174	3.83%	▼10.30
Independent	Suneeta Rana	1,305	1.58%	New
Independent	Rita Wati	899	1.09%	New
NOTA	None of the above	808	0.98%	New
Margin of victory		9,531	11.51%	▲3.15
Turnout		82,839	76.34%	▲1.77
Registered electors		1,08,512		▲20.05
BJP hold		Swing	▲12.10	

=== Assembly Election 2012 ===
2012 Uttarakhand Legislative Assembly election: Nanakmatta
Party	Candidate	Votes	%	±%
BJP	Dr. Prem Singh Rana	26,652	39.54%	New
INC	Gopal Singh Rana	21,021	31.19%	New
BSP	Bhim Singh	9,521	14.13%	New
SP	Ansuiya Rana	4,213	6.25%	New
UKD	Jasveer Singh	1,529	2.27%	New
NCP	Ramesh Chandra Rana	1,432	2.12%	New
Independent	Mahendra Singh	1,303	1.93%	New
CPI(M)	Hari Singh	1,014	1.50%	New
Independent	Beer Singh	678	1.01%	New
Margin of victory		5,631	8.35%	
Turnout		67,398	74.57%	
Registered electors		90,386		
BJP win (new seat)				

== See also ==
- List of constituencies of the Uttarakhand Legislative Assembly
- Udham Singh Nagar district
