= Khatima Assembly constituency =

Constituency of the Uttarakhand legislative assembly in India

Coordinates: 28.9°N 80.0°E

Khatima
- Constituency No. 70 for the Uttarakhand Legislative Assembly

Constituency details
- Country: India
- Region: North India
- State: Uttarakhand
- District: Udham Singh Nagar
- Lok Sabha constituency: Nainital-Udhamsingh Nagar
- Total electors: 120,145
- Reservation: None

Member of Legislative Assembly
- 5th Uttarakhand Legislative Assembly
- Incumbent Bhuwan Chandra Kapri
- Party: Indian National Congress
- Elected year: 2022

Khatima Legislative Assembly constituency is one of the seventy electoral Uttarakhand Legislative Assembly constituencies of Uttarakhand state in India. It includes Khatima area of Udham Singh Nagar district and is a part of Nainital-Udhamsingh Nagar (Lok Sabha constituency).

== Members of the Legislative Assembly ==
Election	Member	Party
1989	Yashpal Arya	Indian National Congress
1991	Lakhan Singh	Bharatiya Janata Party
1993	Yashpal Arya	Indian National Congress
1996	Suresh Chandra Arya	Bharatiya Janata Party
Major boundary changes
2002	Gopal Singh Rana	Indian National Congress
2007	Gopal Singh Rana	Indian National Congress
Major boundary changes
2012	Pushkar Singh Dhami	Bharatiya Janata Party
2017	Pushkar Singh Dhami	Bharatiya Janata Party
2022	Bhuwan Chandra Kapri	Indian National Congress

== Election results ==
=== 2027 Assembly election ===
2027 Uttarakhand Legislative Assembly election: Khatima
Party	Candidate	Votes	%	±%
INC				
BJP				
NOTA	None of the above			
Majority				
Turnout				
gain from		Swing		

=== Assembly Election 2022 ===
2022 Uttarakhand Legislative Assembly election: Khatima
Party	Candidate	Votes	%	±%
INC	Bhuwan Chandra Kapri	48,177	51.89%	▲18.85
BJP	Pushkar Singh Dhami	41,598	44.80%	▲8.43
BSP	Ramesh Singh Rana	937	1.01%	▼20.91
AAP	Sawindarjeet Singh Kaler	764	0.82%	New
NOTA	None of the above	656	0.71%	▼0.39
Margin of victory		6,579	7.09%	▲3.75
Turnout		92,850	75.57%	▼0.91
Registered electors		1,22,870		▲15.70
INC gain from BJP		Swing	▲15.52	

=== Assembly Election 2017 ===
2017 Uttarakhand Legislative Assembly election: Khatima
Party	Candidate	Votes	%	±%
BJP	Pushkar Singh Dhami	29,539	36.37%	▲6.46
INC	Bhuwan Chandra Kapri	26,830	33.03%	▲10.96
BSP	Ramesh Singh Rana	17,804	21.92%	▲8.16
Independent	Lalit Singh	4,516	5.56%	New
NOTA	None of the above	890	1.10%	New
Margin of victory		2,709	3.34%	▼4.50
Turnout		81,223	76.48%	▲0.92
Registered electors		1,06,200		▲16.57
BJP hold		Swing	▲6.46	

=== Assembly Election 2012 ===
2012 Uttarakhand Legislative Assembly election: Khatima
Party	Candidate	Votes	%	±%
BJP	Pushkar Singh Dhami	20,586	29.91%	▲10.07
INC	Davendra Chand	15,192	22.07%	▼19.05
Independent	Ramesh Singh Rana	13,845	20.11%	New
BSP	Dr. G. C. Pandey	9,475	13.76%	▲2.10
SP	Kunwar Jaivardhan Singh	4,056	5.89%	▼0.34
Independent	Ramesh Chandar Joshi Urf Ramu Bhaya	1,804	2.62%	New
Maidani Kranti Dal	Chaudhary Sudeshpal Singh	640	0.93%	New
UKD	Vinod Chand	564	0.82%	▼17.16
Independent	Manvinder Singh Khaira	543	0.79%	New
Independent	Chetram	469	0.68%	New
Independent	Daya Krishna Joshi Urf Dayalu Guru	467	0.68%	New
Margin of victory		5,394	7.84%	▼13.45
Turnout		68,835	75.56%	▲8.38
Registered electors		91,104		
BJP gain from INC		Swing	▼11.21	

=== Assembly Election 2007 ===
2007 Uttarakhand Legislative Assembly election: Khatima
Party	Candidate	Votes	%	±%
INC	Gopal Singh Rana	36,561	41.12%	▲3.20
BJP	Gopal Singh Harlal	17,637	19.84%	▲5.32
UKD	K. R. Singh	15,989	17.98%	▲3.90
BSP	Bheem Singh	10,368	11.66%	▼8.22
SP	Dan Singh	5,544	6.24%	▼4.45
Independent	Harnam Singh	1,559	1.75%	New
Independent	Surendra Singh	459	0.52%	New
Margin of victory		18,924	21.28%	▲3.25
Turnout		88,913	67.19%	▲8.69
Registered electors		1,32,349		
INC hold		Swing	▲3.20	

=== Assembly Election 2002 ===
2002 Uttaranchal Legislative Assembly election: Khatima
Party	Candidate	Votes	%	±%
INC	Gopal Singh Rana	22,588	37.92%	New
BSP	Dan Singh	11,844	19.88%	New
BJP	Sushama Rana	8,648	14.52%	New
UKD	K. R. Singh	8,392	14.09%	New
SP	Veer Singh	6,364	10.68%	New
Independent	Dinesh Vyas	1,228	2.06%	New
Uttarakhand Janwadi Party	Indra Singh	509	0.85%	New
Margin of victory		10,744	18.04%	
Turnout		59,573	58.50%	
Registered electors		1,01,845		
INC win (new seat)				

== See also ==
- List of constituencies of the Uttarakhand Legislative Assembly
- Udham Singh Nagar district
