= Chaubattakhal Assembly constituency =

Legislative Assembly constituency in Uttarakhand State, India

Coordinates: 29.95°N 79.3°E

Chaubattakhal
- Constituency No. 39 for the Uttarakhand Legislative Assembly

Constituency details
- Country: India
- Region: North India
- State: Uttarakhand
- District: Pauri Garhwal
- Lok Sabha constituency: Garhwal
- Total electors: 91,136
- Reservation: None

Member of Legislative Assembly
- 5th Uttarakhand Legislative Assembly
- Incumbent Satpal Maharaj
- Party: Bharatiya Janata Party
- Elected year: 2022

Chaubttakhal is one of the 70 constituencies in the Uttarakhand Legislative Assembly of Uttarakhand state of India. Chaubattakhal is also part of Garhwal Lok Sabha constituency.

== Members of Legislative Assembly ==
Year	Member	Party
2012	Tirath Singh Rawat	Bharatiya Janata Party
2017	Satpal Maharaj	Bharatiya Janata Party
2022	Satpal Maharaj	Bharatiya Janata Party

== Election results ==
=== 2027 Assembly election ===
2027 Uttarakhand Legislative Assembly election: Chaubattakhal
Party	Candidate	Votes	%	±%
INC				
BJP				
NOTA	None of the above			
Majority				
Turnout				
gain from		Swing		

=== Assembly Election 2022 ===
2022 Uttarakhand Legislative Assembly election: Chaubattakhal
Party	Candidate	Votes	%	±%
BJP	Satpal Maharaj	24,927	58.72%	▲10.57
INC	Keshar Singh	13,497	31.80%	▲0.57
AAP	Digmohan Negi	1,908	4.50%	New
NOTA	Nota	590	1.39%	New
Independent	Ashwani Gusain	533	1.26%	New
Uttarakhand Kranti Dal (Democratic)	Anu Pant	316	0.74%	▲0.02
Independent	Arun Kumar	260	0.61%	New
Margin of victory		11,430	26.93%	▲10.00
Turnout		42,447	44.86%	▼2.05
Registered electors		94,620		▲2.17
BJP hold		Swing	▲10.57	

=== Assembly Election 2017 ===
2017 Uttarakhand Legislative Assembly election: Chaubattakhal
Party	Candidate	Votes	%	±%
BJP	Satpal Maharaj	20,921	48.16%	▲14.72
INC	Rajpal Singh Bisht	13,567	31.23%	▲2.24
Independent	Sunder Singh Chauhan	2,545	5.86%	New
Independent	Kavinder Istwal	2,339	5.38%	New
Independent	Satendra Singh	965	2.22%	New
Independent	Nandan Singh Rawat	433	1.00%	New
Independent	Ramendra Singh Bhandari	323	0.74%	New
Uttarakhand Kranti Dal (Democratic)	Anu Pant	316	0.73%	New
Independent	Manju Rawat	241	0.55%	New
Margin of victory		7,354	16.93%	▲12.47
Turnout		43,442	46.91%	▼4.02
Registered electors		92,610		▲7.00
BJP hold		Swing	▲14.72	

=== Assembly Election 2012 ===
2012 Uttarakhand Legislative Assembly election: Chaubattakhal
Party	Candidate	Votes	%	±%
BJP	Tirath Singh Rawat	14,741	33.44%	New
INC	Rajpal Singh Bisht	12,777	28.99%	New
Independent	Yashpal Benam	6,253	14.19%	New
BSP	Rajesh Kandari	4,725	10.72%	New
Independent	Dr. Harender Singh Rawat	2,915	6.61%	New
URM	Brig. (Retd) Surender Singh Patwal	894	2.03%	New
Independent	Ramesh Chandra Juyal	534	1.21%	New
Independent	Bharat Bhushan	422	0.96%	New
Independent	Jaspal Singh	379	0.86%	New
Margin of victory		1,964	4.46%	
Turnout		44,078	50.93%	
Registered electors		86,551		
BJP win (new seat)				

== See also ==
- Bironkhal (Uttarakhand Assembly constituency)
- List of constituencies of the Uttarakhand Legislative Assembly
- Pauri Garhwal district
