= BHEL Ranipur Assembly constituency =

Constituency of the Uttarakhand legislative assembly in India

Coordinates: 29.95°N 78.08°E

BHEL Ranipur
- Constituency No. 26 for the Uttarakhand Legislative Assembly

Constituency details
- Country: India
- Region: North India
- State: Uttarakhand
- District: Haridwar
- Lok Sabha constituency: Haridwar
- Established: 2008
- Total electors: 163,883
- Reservation: None

Member of Legislative Assembly
- 5th Uttarakhand Legislative Assembly
- Incumbent Adesh Chauhan
- Party: Bhartiya Janata Party
- Elected year: 2022

BHEL Ranipur Legislative Assembly constituency is one of the seventy electoral Uttarakhand Legislative Assembly constituencies of Uttarakhand state in India. It includes Ranipur area of Haridwar District.

BHEL Ranipur Legislative Assembly constituency is a part of Haridwar (Lok Sabha constituency). The constituency is also a part of Haridwar Municipal Corporation where it covers 8 wards.

== Members of the Legislative Assembly ==
Year	Member	Party
2012	Adesh Chauhan	Bharatiya Janata Party
2017	Adesh Chauhan	Bharatiya Janata Party
2022	Adesh Chauhan	Bharatiya Janata Party

== Election results ==
=== 2027 Assembly election ===
2027 Uttarakhand Legislative Assembly election: BHEL Ranipur
Party	Candidate	Votes	%	±%
INC				
BJP				
NOTA	None of the above			
Majority				
Turnout				
gain from		Swing		

=== Assembly Election 2022 ===
2022 Uttarakhand Legislative Assembly election: BHEL Ranipur
Party	Candidate	Votes	%	±%
BJP	Adesh Chauhan	57,544	50.61%	▼3.87
INC	Rajbir Singh Chauhan	43,682	38.42%	▲5.33
BSP	Ompal Singh	5,880	5.17%	▼4.42
AAP	Prashant Rai	3,355	2.95%	New
ASP(KR)	Praveen Surya	1,480	1.30%	New
NOTA	Nota	629	0.55%	New
Margin of victory		13,862	12.19%	▼9.20
Turnout		1,13,702	69.32%	▼1.44
Registered electors		1,64,022		▲11.63
BJP hold		Swing	▼3.87	

=== Assembly Election 2017 ===
2017 Uttarakhand Legislative Assembly election: BHEL Ranipur
Party	Candidate	Votes	%	±%
BJP	Adesh Chauhan	56,644	54.48%	▲20.67
INC	Ambrish Kumar	34,404	33.09%	▲19.92
BSP	Prashant Rai	9,971	9.59%	▼8.59
Margin of victory		22,240	21.39%	▲12.92
Turnout		1,03,974	70.76%	▲1.86
Registered electors		1,46,932		▲29.63
BJP hold		Swing	▲20.67	

=== Assembly Election 2012 ===
2012 Uttarakhand Legislative Assembly election: BHEL Ranipur
Party	Candidate	Votes	%	±%
BJP	Adesh Chauhan	26,402	33.81%	New
Independent	Ambrish Kumar	19,791	25.34%	New
BSP	Vishal Singh	14,195	18.18%	New
INC	Balvant Singh	10,281	13.16%	New
Independent	Ataur Rahman	1,503	1.92%	New
CPI	Munarika Yadav	582	0.75%	New
CPI(M)	Pitambar Baloni	559	0.72%	New
Independent	Arjun Nagyan	534	0.68%	New
Independent	Janak Singh	420	0.54%	New
Independent	Alok Kumar Gupta	416	0.53%	New
URM	Mohan Singh Rawat	411	0.53%	New
Margin of victory		6,611	8.47%	
Turnout		78,098	68.90%	
Registered electors		1,13,343		
BJP win (new seat)				

== See also ==
- Haridwar (Lok Sabha constituency)
