= Rudrapur, Uttarakhand Assembly constituency =

Constituency of the Uttarakhand legislative assembly in India

Coordinates: 28.985°N 79.408°E

Rudrapur
- Constituency No. 66 for the Uttarakhand Legislative Assembly

Constituency details
- Country: India
- Region: North India
- State: Uttarakhand
- District: Udham Singh Nagar district
- Lok Sabha constituency: Nainital-Udham Singh Nagar
- Established: 2012
- Total electors: 192,593
- Reservation: None

Member of Legislative Assembly
- 5th Uttarakhand Legislative Assembly
- Incumbent Shiv Arora
- Party: Bharatiya Janata Party
- Elected year: 2022

Rudrapur Legislative Assembly constituency is one of the seventy electoral Uttarakhand Legislative Assembly constituencies of Uttarakhand state in India. It includes Rudrapur area of Udham Singh Nagar District.

Rudrapur Legislative Assembly constituency is a part of Nainital-Udhamsingh Nagar (Lok Sabha constituency).

== Members of the Legislative Assembly ==
Election	Member	Party
2012	Rajkumar Thukral	Bharatiya Janata Party
2017	Rajkumar Thukral	Bharatiya Janata Party
2022	Shiv Arora	Bharatiya Janata Party

== Election results ==
=== 2027 Assembly election ===
2027 Uttarakhand Legislative Assembly election: Rudrapur
Party	Candidate	Votes	%	±%
INC				
BJP				
NOTA	None of the above			
Majority				
Turnout				
gain from		Swing		

=== Assembly Election 2022 ===
2022 Uttarakhand Legislative Assembly election: Rudrapur
Party	Candidate	Votes	%	±%
BJP	Shiv Arora	60,602	45.69%	▼13.13
INC	Meena Sharma	40,852	30.80%	▼6.83
Independent	Rajkumar Thukral	26,988	20.35%	New
AAP	Nand Lal	1,212	0.91%	New
BSP	Chandrakeshwar Rao	1,095	0.83%	▼0.43
NOTA	None of the above	554	0.42%	▼0.09
Margin of victory		19,750	14.89%	▼6.30
Turnout		1,32,651	68.83%	▼4.55
Registered electors		1,92,723		▲20.98
BJP hold		Swing	▼13.13	

=== Assembly Election 2017 ===
2017 Uttarakhand Legislative Assembly election: Rudrapur
Party	Candidate	Votes	%	±%
BJP	Rajkumar Thukral	68,754	58.81%	▲19.07
INC	Tilak Raj Behar	43,983	37.62%	▲2.10
BSP	Jaswant Singh	1,471	1.26%	▼18.65
NOTA	None of the above	596	0.51%	New
Margin of victory		24,771	21.19%	▲16.98
Turnout		1,16,899	73.38%	▼5.14
Registered electors		1,59,301		▲33.31
BJP hold		Swing	▲19.07	

=== Assembly Election 2012 ===
2012 Uttarakhand Legislative Assembly election: Rudrapur
Party	Candidate	Votes	%	±%
BJP	Rajkumar Thukral	37,291	39.74%	New
INC	Tilak Raj Behar	33,337	35.53%	New
BSP	Premananad Mahajan	18,681	19.91%	New
SP	Tajindra Singh	1,785	1.90%	New
Independent	Sanjay Sahni	843	0.90%	New
Margin of victory		3,954	4.21%	
Turnout		93,836	78.52%	
Registered electors		1,19,500		
BJP win (new seat)				

== See also ==
- Rudrapur–Kichha (Uttarakhand Assembly constituency)
