= Jwalapur Assembly constituency =

Constituency of the Uttarakhand legislative assembly in India

Coordinates: 29.93°N 78.11°E

Jwalapur
- Constituency No. 27 for the Uttarakhand Legislative Assembly

Constituency details
- Country: India
- Region: North India
- State: Uttarakhand
- District: Haridwar
- Lok Sabha constituency: Haridwar
- Total electors: 116,836 (2022)
- Reservation: SC

Member of Legislative Assembly
- 5th Uttarakhand Legislative Assembly
- Incumbent Ravi Bahadur
- Party: Indian National Congress
- Elected year: 2022

Jwalapur Assembly constituency is one of the seventy electoral Uttarakhand Legislative Assembly constituencies of Uttarakhand state in India. It includes Jwalapur area of Haridwar District.

Jwalapur Legislative Assembly constituency is a part of Haridwar (Lok Sabha constituency). The constituency comes under the Haridwar Municipal Corporation, where it covers 37 wards.

== Members of the Legislative Assembly ==
Election	Member	Party
2012	Chandra Shekhar	Bharatiya Janata Party
2017	Suresh Rathor	Bharatiya Janata Party
2022	Ravi Bahadur	Indian National Congress

== Election results ==
=== 2027 Assembly election ===
2027 Uttarakhand Legislative Assembly election: Jwalapur
Party	Candidate	Votes	%	±%
INC				
BJP				
NOTA	None of the above			
Majority				
Turnout				
gain from		Swing		

=== Assembly Election 2022 ===
2022 Uttarakhand Legislative Assembly election: Jwalapur
Party	Candidate	Votes	%	±%
INC	Ravi Bahadur	42,372	45.68	▲17.25
BJP	Suresh Rathore	29,029	31.30	▼2.64
BSP	Shishpal Singh	14,760	15.91	▼6.49
ASP(KR)	S. P. Singh Engineer	4,208	4.54	New
AAP	Mamta Singh	929	1.00	New
SP	Sanatan Sonker	601	0.65	New
NOTA	None of the above	494	0.53	▼0.20
Margin of victory		13,343	14.38	▲8.88
Turnout		92,757	79.30	▼0.59
Registered electors		1,16,971		▲7.44
INC gain from BJP		Swing	▲11.75	

=== Assembly Election 2017 ===
2017 Uttarakhand Legislative Assembly election: Jwalapur
Party	Candidate	Votes	%	±%
BJP	Suresh Rathor	29,513	33.93	▲3.69
INC	S. P. Singh Engineer	24,725	28.43	▼0.89
BSP	Mulki Raj	19,483	22.40	▼7.05
Independent	Braj Rani	9,338	10.74	New
Independent	Subhash Chanchal	1,544	1.78	New
Independent	Madan Lal	1,077	1.24	New
NOTA	None of the above	638	0.73	New
Independent	Arvind Kumar	559	0.64	New
Margin of victory		4,788	5.51	▲4.71
Turnout		86,975	79.89	▲1.82
Registered electors		1,08,875		▲20.67
BJP hold		Swing	▲3.69	

=== Assembly Election 2012 ===
2012 Uttarakhand Legislative Assembly election: Jwalapur
Party	Candidate	Votes	%	±%
BJP	Chandra Shekhar	21,303	30.24	
BSP	Madan Lal	20,745	29.45	
INC	Braj Rani	20,649	29.31	
RLNP	Kavita	2,926	4.15	
Independent	Subhash Chanchal	2,792	3.96	
NCP	Raju Singh	479	0.68	
Independent	Babu Ram	387	0.55	
Margin of victory		558	0.79	
Turnout		70,440	78.07	
Registered electors		90,228		
BJP win (new seat)				

== See also ==
- Bahadarabad (Uttarakhand Assembly constituency)
