= Rajpur Road Assembly constituency =

Constituency of Indian State Uttarakhand

Coordinates: 30.33°N 78.05°E

Rajpur Road
- Constituency No. 20 for the Uttarakhand Legislative Assembly

Constituency details
- Country: India
- Region: North India
- State: Uttarakhand
- District: Dehradun
- Lok Sabha constituency: Tehri Garhwal
- Total electors: 119,301
- Reservation: SC

Member of Legislative Assembly
- 5th Uttarakhand Legislative Assembly
- Incumbent Khajan Dass
- Party: Bharatiya Janata Party
- Elected year: 2022

Rajpur Road is one of the 70 Legislative Assembly constituencies of Uttarakhand state in India.

It is part of Dehradun district and is reserved for candidates belonging to the Scheduled castes. Khajan Dass is the current MLA from Rajpur Road. The constituency also covers 25 wards of the Dehradun Municipal Corporation.

== Members of the Legislative Assembly ==
| Election | Member | Party |
|---|---|---|
| 2012 | Rajkumar S/O Chiranji Lala | Indian National Congress |
| 2017 | Khajan Dass | Bharatiya Janata Party |
| 2022 | Khajan Dass | Bharatiya Janata Party |

== Election results ==
=== 2027 Assembly election ===
2027 Uttarakhand Legislative Assembly election: Rajpur
| Party | Candidate | Votes | % | ±% |
|---|---|---|---|---|
| INC | | | | |
| BJP | | | | |
| NOTA | None of the above | | | |
| Majority | | | | |
| Turnout | | | | |
| gain from | | Swing | | |

=== Assembly Election 2022 ===
2022 Uttarakhand Legislative Assembly election: Rajpur Road
| Party | Candidate | Votes | % | ±% |
|---|---|---|---|---|
| BJP | Khajan Dass | 37,027 | 53.62% | ▲0.95 |
| INC | Rajkumar S/O Chiranji Lala | 25,864 | 37.45% | ▼2.79 |
| AAP | Dimpal | 4,127 | 5.98% | New |
| NOTA | None of the above | 617 | 0.89% | ▼0.11 |
| BSP | Dhansingh | 404 | 0.59% | ▼2.23 |
| Independent | Amar Singh Swedia | 396 | 0.57% | New |
| Margin of victory | | 11,163 | 16.17% | ▲3.74 |
| Turnout | | 69,056 | 57.73% | ▼0.28 |
| Registered electors | | 1,19,615 | | ▼0.16 |
| BJP hold | | Swing | ▲0.95 | |

=== Assembly Election 2017 ===
2017 Uttarakhand Legislative Assembly election: Rajpur Road
| Party | Candidate | Votes | % | ±% |
|---|---|---|---|---|
| BJP | Khajan Dass | 36,601 | 52.67% | ▲10.80 |
| INC | Rajkumar S/O Chiranji Lala | 27,969 | 40.25% | ▼6.71 |
| BSP | Jag Ram Singh | 1,959 | 2.82% | ▼5.50 |
| Independent | Ajay Sonkar | 1,484 | 2.14% | New |
| NOTA | None of the above | 697 | 1.00% | New |
| Margin of victory | | 8,632 | 12.42% | ▲7.33 |
| Turnout | | 69,495 | 58.01% | ▼2.85 |
| Registered electors | | 1,19,801 | | ▲21.03 |
| BJP gain from INC | | Swing | ▲5.71 | |

=== Assembly Election 2012 ===
2012 Uttarakhand Legislative Assembly election: Rajpur Road
| Party | Candidate | Votes | % | ±% |
|---|---|---|---|---|
| INC | Rajkumar S/O Chiranji Lala | 28,291 | 46.96% | New |
| BJP | Ravinder Singh Kataria | 25,221 | 41.86% | New |
| BSP | Tanveer Singh | 5,011 | 8.32% | New |
| Independent | Sanjeev Kumar | 449 | 0.75% | New |
| SP | Sapna Sonkar | 304 | 0.50% | New |
| Margin of victory | | 3,070 | 5.10% | |
| Turnout | | 60,246 | 60.86% | |
| Registered electors | | 98,988 | | |
| INC win (new seat) | | | | |

== See also ==
- Rajpur (Uttarakhand Assembly constituency)
