= Prem Singh Rana =

Indian politician

Member of the Uttarakhand Legislative Assembly
- In office 2012–2022
- Preceded by: Constituency established
- Succeeded by: Gopal Singh Rana
- Constituency: Nanak Matta

Personal details
- Born: 20 May 1976 (age 49) Village Saronja, Uttarakhand, India
- Party: Bharatiya Janata Party
- Spouse: Sarita Devi (m. 1995)
- Children: 3
- Parent: Firu Singh (father)
- Education: Ph. D.
- Profession: Agriculture
- Source

Dr. Prem Singh Rana is an Indian politician and member of the Bharatiya Janata Party. Rana is a two term member of the Uttarakhand Legislative Assembly from the Nanakmatta constituency in Udham Singh Nagar district.
