= Vinod Kandari =

Indian politician

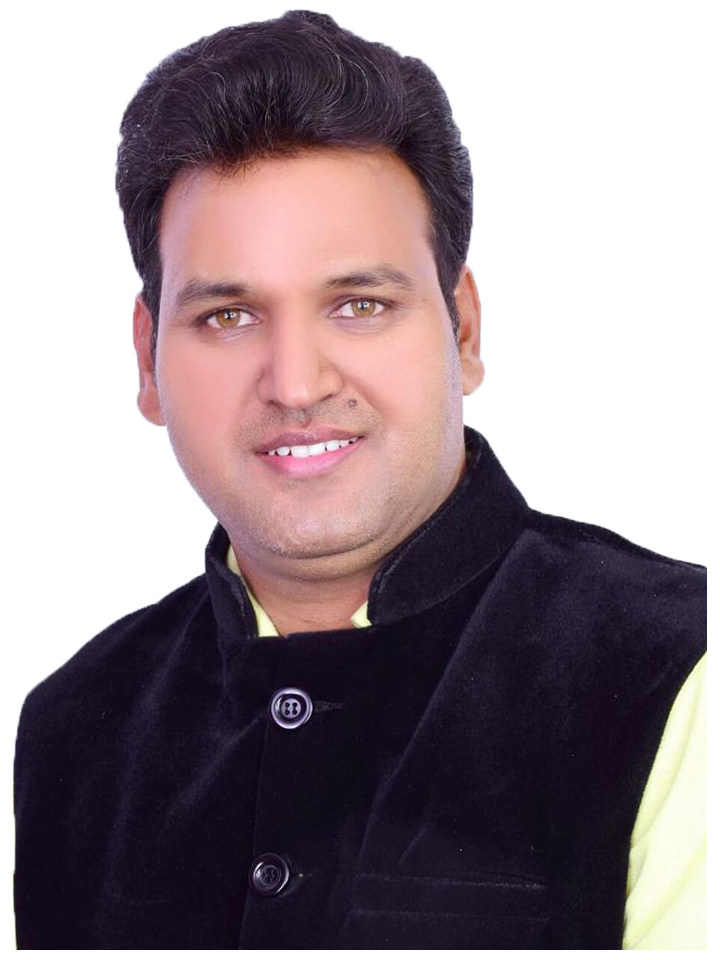

Vinod Kandari (born 10 March 1981) is an Indian politician and member of the Bharatiya Janata Party. Kandari is a member of the Uttarakhand Legislative Assembly from the Devprayag constituency in the Tehri Garhwal district where he has a residence at Dehradun. He has been MLA for Devprayag consecutively. In the 2017 Assembly election, he defeated his nearest rival Diwakar Bhatt an Independent by a margin of 10,325 votes.

Vinod Kandari was elected as the member of Uttarakhand Legislative Assembly from Bhartiya Janata Party in 2022 Uttarakhand Legislative Assembly election and defeated Diwakar Bhatt of Uttarakhand Kranti Dal by the margin of 2588 votes.
