= Bhuwan Chandra Kapri =

Indian politician

Bhuwan Kapri
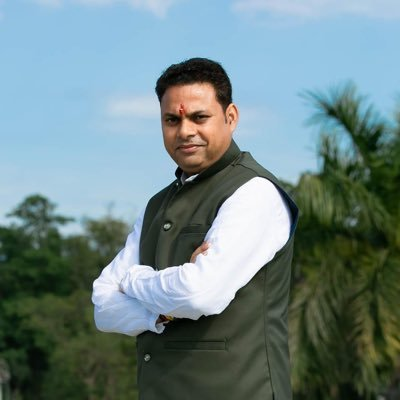
- Kapri in 2022

Member of the Uttarakhand Legislative Assembly
- Incumbent
- Assumed office 10 March 2022
- Preceded by: Pushkar Singh Dhami
- Constituency: Khatima

Deputy Leader of Opposition Uttarakhand Legislative Assembly
- Incumbent
- Assumed office 10 April 2022
- Governor: Gurmit Singh (general)
- Leader: Yashpal Arya
- Preceded by: Karan Mahra

Personal details
- Born: Pithoragarh Uttar Pradesh (now in Uttarakhand, India)
- Citizenship: India
- Party: Indian National Congress
- Parent(s): Liladhar Kapri (father); Godawari Kapri (mother)
- Education: Bachelor of Science; L.L.B.
- Alma mater: Kumaun University
- Occupation: Politician

Bhuwan Chandra Kapri is an Indian politician and a member of Indian National Congress, who represents Khatima constituency. On 10 April 2022, Bhuwan Chandra Kapri was elected as the Deputy Leader of Congress Legislative Party (CLP) in the Uttarakhand Legislative Assembly.

Kapri won the 2022 Uttarakhand Legislative Assembly election from Khatima constituency, with a margin of 6579 votes against the incumbent Chief Minister of Uttarakhand, Pushkar Singh Dhami. He is also a former Working President of Uttarakhand Pradesh Congress Committee.

Bhuwan Kapri lost the 2017 Uttarakhand Legislative Assembly Election to Pushkar Singh Dhami and finished as runner up.

Kapri has been associated with the Indian National Congress and National Students' Union of India for a long time. He started his political career from Hemwati Nandan Bahuguna Govt PG College, Khatima where he became President of the Students’ Union. Previously he also served as the Chairman of Khatima Mandi Council.

== Early life and education ==
Kapri was born in a Kumaoni Brahmin family in Harari village of Pithoragarh district in the state of Uttar Pradesh (now Uttarakhand) on 11 November 1981 to Liladhar Kapri and Godawari Kapri.

He studied there until 3rd standard after that they moved to Khatima. He received a Bachelor of Science, Master of Arts and later Bachelor of Laws from Kumaun University in 2014, where he was also elected as President of the Student’s Union of HNBPG Khatima.

== Positions held ==
Public Offices
Year	Description
2004 - 2005	President of the Student’s Union HNBPG Khatima
2013 - 2017	Chairman of Mandi Council Khatima
2022 - Till Date	Elected to 5th Uttarakhand Assembly: Deputy Leader of Opposition Uttarakhand Legislative Assembly

Within Party
Year	Description
2005 - 2008	State General Secretary National Students' Union of India Uttarakhand.
2009 - 2011	Lok Sabha (Nainital–U.S.Nagar) President Indian Youth Congress.
2013 - 2018	State President Indian Youth Congress Uttarakhand.
2018 - 2021	General Secretary Uttarakhand Pradesh Congress Committee.
2021 - 2022	Working President Uttarakhand Pradesh Congress Committee.

== Electoral performances ==
Year	Election	Constituency	Party	Votes	%	Opponent	Opposition Party	Opposition Votes	%	Margin	Result	Ref
2017	MLA	Khatima	INC	26,830	33.03%	Pushkar Singh Dhami	BJP	29,539	36.37%	-2,709	Lost	
2022	MLA	Khatima	INC	48,177	51.89%	Pushkar Singh Dhami	BJP	41,598	44.80%	+6,579	Won	
