= Adesh Chauhan =

Indian politician

- आदेश चौहान

Member of the Uttarakhand Legislative Assembly
- Incumbent
- Assumed office 2012
- Constituency: B.H.E.L. Ranipur

Personal details
- Born: April 6, 1969 (age 57) Uttarakhand, India
- Party: Bharatiya Janata Party
- Parent: Kalam Singh (father)
- Occupation: Politician
- Profession: Medical Store Business

Adesh Chauhan is an Indian politician and member of the Bharatiya Janata Party. He is the member of the Uttarakhand Legislative Assembly from the BHEL Ranipur constituency in Haridwar district. He first competed in Legislative election in 2012 from Ranipur constituency. He was elected once again in 2017 for a second time in a row.

== Electoral performance ==
2022 Uttarakhand Legislative Assembly election: BHEL Ranipur
Party	Candidate	Votes	%	±%
BJP	Adesh Chauhan	57,544	50.61%	▼3.87
INC	Rajbir Singh Chauhan	43,682	38.42%	▲5.33
BSP	Ompal Singh	5,880	5.17%	▼4.42
AAP	Prashant Rai	3,355	2.95%	New
ASP(KR)	Praveen Surya	1,480	1.30%	New
NOTA	Nota	629	0.55%	New
Margin of victory		13,862	12.19%	▼9.20
Turnout		1,13,702	69.32%	▼1.44
Registered electors		1,64,022		▲11.63
BJP hold		Swing	▼3.87	

2017 Uttarakhand Legislative Assembly election: BHEL Ranipur
Party	Candidate	Votes	%	±%
BJP	Adesh Chauhan	56,644	54.48%	▲20.67
INC	Ambrish Kumar	34,404	33.09%	▲19.92
BSP	Prashant Rai	9,971	9.59%	▼8.59
Margin of victory		22,240	21.39%	▲12.92
Turnout		1,03,974	70.76%	▲1.86
Registered electors		1,46,932		▲29.63
BJP hold		Swing	▲20.67	

2012 Uttarakhand Legislative Assembly election: BHEL Ranipur
Party	Candidate	Votes	%	±%
BJP	Adesh Chauhan	26,402	33.81%	New
Independent	Ambrish Kumar	19,791	25.34%	New
BSP	Vishal Singh	14,195	18.18%	New
INC	Balvant Singh	10,281	13.16%	New
Independent	Ataur Rahman	1,503	1.92%	New
CPI	Munarika Yadav	582	0.75%	New
CPI(M)	Pitambar Baloni	559	0.72%	New
Independent	Arjun Nagyan	534	0.68%	New
Independent	Janak Singh	420	0.54%	New
Independent	Alok Kumar Gupta	416	0.53%	New
URM	Mohan Singh Rawat	411	0.53%	New
Margin of victory		6,611	8.47%	
Turnout		78,098	68.90%	
Registered electors		1,13,343		
BJP win (new seat)				
