= Durgeshwar Lal =

Indian politician

Member of the Uttarakhand Legislative Assembly
- Incumbent
- Assumed office 2022
- Constituency: Purola

Personal details
- Party: Bhartiya Janata Party

Durgeshwar Lal is an Indian politician from Uttarakhand. He is a member of the Uttarakhand Legislative Assembly representing Purola Assembly constituency representing the Bharatiya Janata Party.

Lal won the 2022 Uttarakhand Legislative Assembly election. He defeated Malchand of the Indian National Congress by 6029 votes.

In 2022, Uttarakhand SDM lodged a police complaint against Durgeshwar Lal at Purola Police Station accusing him of uploading misleading posts.
