= Shakti Lal Shah =

Indian politician from Uttarakhand

MLA Shakti Lal Shah
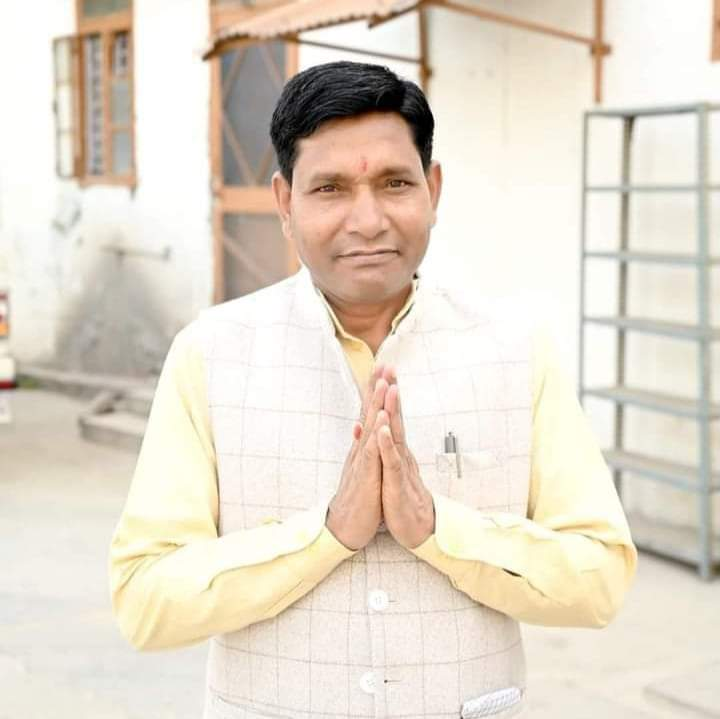

Member of Legislative Assembly for Ghansali
- Incumbent
- Assumed office 2017

Personal details
- Party: BJP

Shakti Lal Shah is an Indian politician from Uttarakhand and a First term Member of the Uttarakhand Legislative Assembly. Shakti Lal Shah represents the Ghansali (Uttarakhand Assembly constituency). Shakti Lal Shah is a member of the Bharatiya Janata Party.

Shakti Lal Shah defeated Dhani Lal Shah of Indian National Congress by 10,285 votes in the 2022 Uttarakhand Legislative Assembly election.
