= Gopal Singh Rana =

Indian politician

Member of the Uttarakhand Legislative Assembly
- Incumbent
- Assumed office 10 March 2022
- Preceded by: Prem Singh Rana, BJP
- Constituency: Nanakmatta
- In office 24 February 2002 – 6 March 2012
- Preceded by: Suresh Chandra Arya, BJP
- Succeeded by: Pushkar Singh Dhami, BJP
- Constituency: Khatima

Personal details
- Party: Indian National Congress

Gopal Singh Rana is an Indian politician from Uttarakhand and a three term Member of the Uttarakhand Legislative Assembly. Gopal represented the Khatima Assembly constituency in the 1st Uttarakhand Assembly, 2nd Uttarakhand Assembly and Nanakmatta Assembly constituency in the 5th Uttarakhand legislative Assembly.

== Positions held ==
Year	Description
2002 - 2007	Elected to 1st Uttarakhand Assembly: Member - Committee on SC, ST and Other Caste (2002–07); Member - Committee on Assembly Rules (2002–04); Member - Committee on Government Assurances (2003–04); Member - Committee on Estimates (2004–07)
2007 - 2012	Elected to 2nd Uttarakhand Assembly (2nd term): Member - Committee on SC, ST and Other Caste (2007–12)
2022 - Till date	Elected to 5th Uttarakhand Assembly (3rd term): Chairman - Committee on SC, ST and Other Caste (2022–23)
