= M. S. Bisht =

Indian politician

Dr. Mohan Singh Bisht

Member of the Uttarakhand Legislative Assembly
- Incumbent
- Assumed office 10 March 2022
- Preceded by: Naveen Chandra Dumka
- Constituency: Lalkuan

Personal details
- Born: 1969 (age 56–57)
- Party: Bharatiya Janata Party
- Profession: Politician

Dr. Mohan Singh Bisht (born 1969) is an Indian politician from Uttarakhand. He is a Member of Uttarakhand Legislative Assembly from Lalkuan Assembly constituency representing the Bharatiya Janata Party.

== Early life and education ==
Bisht is from Lalkuan, Nainital District, Uttarakhand. He is the son of Gopal Singh. He completed his Ph.D. in 2004 at Kumaun University, Nainital, D.S.B. Campus after his M.A. in 2004.

== Career ==
Bisht won from Lalkuan Assembly constituency representing Bharatiya Janata Party in the 2022 Uttarakhand Legislative Assembly election. He polled 46,307 votes and defeated his nearest rival and former chief minister Harish Rawat of Indian National Congress, by a margin of 17,527 votes.
