= Ravi Bahadur =

Indian politician

Member of the Uttarakhand Legislative Assembly
- Incumbent
- Assumed office 10 March 2022
- Preceded by: Suresh Rathor
- Constituency: Jwalapur

Personal details
- Party: Indian National Congress
- Profession: Politician

Ravi Bahadur is an Indian politician and the MLA from Jwalapur Assembly constituency. He is a member of the Indian National Congress.

Ravi Bahadur won with 42372 votes, defeating incumbent MLA Suresh Rathor of Bhartiya Janata Party by a margin of 13,376 votes in 2022 Uttarakhand Legislative Assembly election.
