= Shiv Arora =

Indian politician

Shiv Arora is an Indian politician. Shiv Arora serves as the MLA from Rudrapur assembly constituency in the Uttarakhand Legislative Assembly, as a member of the Bhartiya Janata Party. In the 2022 Uttarakhand Legislative Assembly election, he defeated the INC candidate Meena Sharma by a margin of more than 19,800 votes.
