= Savita Kapoor =

Indian politician

Member of the Uttarakhand Legislative Assembly
- Incumbent
- Assumed office 10 March 2022
- Preceded by: Harbans Kapoor
- Constituency: Dehradun Cantonment

Personal details
- Party: Bharatiya Janata Party
- Profession: Politician

Savita Kapoor is an Indian politician, wife of Harbans Kapoor and the MLA from Dehradun Cantonment Assembly. She is a member of the Bharatiya Janata Party.
