= Brij Bhushan Gairola =

Indian politician (born 1963)

Brij Bhushan Gairola (born 1963) is an Indian politician from Uttarakhand. He is an MLA from Doiwal Assembly constituency in Dehradun district. He won as an MLA in the 2022 Uttarakhand Legislative Assembly election representing the Bharatiya Janata Party.

== Early life and education ==
Gairola is from Doiwal, Dehradun district, Uttarakhand. He is the son of Chiranjivika Dutt. He completed his Post Graduation in 1989 at Garhwal University.

== Career ==
Gairola won from Doiwal Assembly constituency representing Bharatiya Janata Party in the 2022 Uttarakhand Legislative Assembly election. He polled 64,946 votes and defeated his nearest rival, Gaurav Chaudhary 'Ginni' of Indian National Congress, by a margin of 29,021 votes.
