= Bharat Singh Chaudhary =

Indian politician (born 1959)

Bharat Singh Chaudhary (born 20 May 1959) is an Indian politician from Uttarakhand. Currently, he serves as the Rural Development, Small and Micro-Medium Enterprises, Khadi and Village Industries, Language minister in the Government of Uttarakhand. He is an MLA from Rudraprayag Assembly constituency in Rudraprayag district. He won as an MLA in the 2022 Uttarakhand Legislative Assembly election representing the Bharatiya Janata Party.

== Early life and education ==
Chaudhary is from Rudraprayag, Chamoli district, Uttarakhand. He is the son of the late Chautan Singh Chaudhary. He completed his B.A. in 1979 at a college affiliated with Garhwal University, Srinagar, Garhwal.

== Career ==
Chaudhary started his political journey as pradhan of Mawana gram panchayat. In 2022, he won from Rudraprayag Assembly constituency representing the Bharatiya Janata Party in the 2022 Uttarakhand Legislative Assembly election. He polled 29,660 votes and defeated his nearest rival, Pradeep Thapliyal of Indian National Congress, by a margin of 9,802 votes.
