= Mamta Rakesh =

Indian politician

MLA Mamta Rakesh

Member of Legislative Assembly for Bhagwanpur
- Incumbent
- Assumed office 2015
- Preceded by: Surendra Rakesh

Personal details
- Party: Indian National Congress

Mamta Rakesh is an Indian politician from Uttarakhand and a two term Member of the Uttarakhand Legislative Assembly. Mamta represents the Bhagwanpur (Uttarakhand Assembly constituency). Mamta is a member of the Indian National Congress.

== Elections contested ==
Year	Constituency	Result	Vote percentage	Opposition Candidate	Opposition Party	Opposition vote percentage	Ref
2015 (Bye Elect)	Bhagwanpur	Won	NA	Rajpal Singh	BJP		
2017	Bhagwanpur	Won	NA	Subodh Rakesh	BJP	NA	
2022	Bhagwanpur	Won	NA	Subodh Rakesh	BSP	NA	
