= Bhupal Ram Tamta =

Indian politician (born 1959)

Bhupal Ram Tamta (born 1959) is an Indian politician from Uttarakhand. He is an MLA from Tharali Assembly constituency, which is reserved for Scheduled Caste community, in Chamoli district. He last won in the 2022 Uttarakhand Legislative Assembly election representing the Bhratiya Janata Party.

== Early life and education ==
Tamta is from Tharali, Chamoli district, Uttarakhand. He is the son of Kishan Lal. He passed Class 10 at R.E.K. Narayangarh in 1973 and later did a diploma at Industrial Training Institute at Shrinagar in 1975.

== Career ==
Tamta won from Tharali Assembly constituency representing Bharatiya Janata Party in the 2022 Uttarakhand Legislative Assembly election. He polled 32,852 votes and defeated his nearest rival, Jeet Ram of Indian National Congress, by a margin of 8,302 votes.
