= Trilok Singh Cheema =

Indian politician

Trilok Singh Cheema (born 1967) is an Indian politician from Uttarakhand. He is an MLA from Kashipur Assembly constituency in Udham Singh Nagar district. He won the 2022 Uttarakhand Legislative Assembly election representing the Bharatiya Janata Party.

== Early life and education ==
Cheema is from Kashipur, Udham Singh Nagar district, Uttarakhand. He is the son of Harbajan Singh Cheema, a four time MLA. He completed his graduation in 1985 at a college affiliated with Punjab University, Chandigarh and later did a Diploma in Business Management Rajendra Prasad Institute of Communication and Management, Mumbai, in 1986.

== Career ==
Cheema won from Kashipur Assembly constituency representing the Bharatiya Janata Party in the 2022 Uttarakhand Legislative Assembly election. He polled 48,508 votes and defeated his nearest rival, Narendra Chand Singh of Indian National Congress, by a margin of 16,335 votes.
