= Pushkar Singh Dhami =

Chief Minister of Uttarakhand (born 1975)

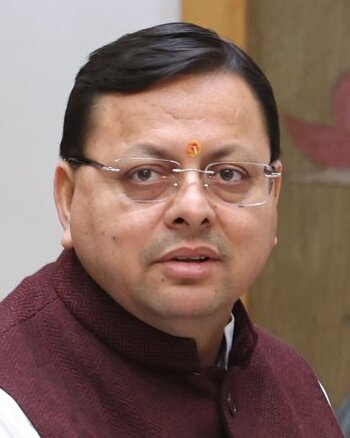
- Dhami, c. 2025

10th Chief Minister of Uttarakhand
- Incumbent
- Assumed office 4 July 2021
- Governor: Gurmit Singh; Baby Rani Maurya
- Cabinet: Dhami I; Dhami II
- Portfolios: Secrecy & Home Affairs; Public Administration; Official Language; Culture; Administrative Reforms
- Preceded by: Tirath Singh Rawat

Member of Uttarakhand Legislative Assembly
- Incumbent
- Assumed office 3 June 2022
- Preceded by: Kailash Chandra Gahtori
- Constituency: Champawat
- In office 8 March 2012 – 10 March 2022
- Preceded by: Gopal Singh Rana
- Succeeded by: Bhuwan Chandra Kapri
- Constituency: Khatima

Personal details
- Born: 16 September 1975 (age 51) Tundi, Uttarakhand, India
- Party: Bharatiya Janata Party
- Spouse: Geeta Dhami
- Children: 2
- Education: BA (1996), Diploma in Public Administration (1997), Master in Human Resource Management (1999), LLB (2002)
- Alma mater: University of Lucknow
- Website: Personal; Official

Pushkar Singh Dhami (born 16 September 1975) is an Indian politician and a member of the Bharatiya Janata Party, serving as the Chief Minister of Uttarakhand since 4 July 2021, who is also the longest serving chief minister for the state. He has represented the Champawat Assembly constituency in the Uttarakhand Legislative Assembly since 2022 and represented Khatima from 2012 to 2022. He lost his seat in the 2022 elections, but was re-elected as Chief Minister by BJP MLAs. He was later elected to Uttarakhand Legislative Assembly following a by-election. He is the only Chief Minister of the state to assume a second consecutive term as CM.

== Personal life and career ==
Pushkar Singh Dhami was born in a Kumaoni Rajput family at Tundi village of Kainchichila Pithoragarh. His ancestral village is Harkhola, Pithoragarh district in the state of Uttarakhand. His family moved to Tundi village where he studied until 5th standard. After that, they moved to Nagla Tarai Bhabar, Khatima. His father was in the army and retired as a Subedar.

He graduated from Lucknow University in Human Resource Management and pursued LL.B. from University of Lucknow.

== Political career ==
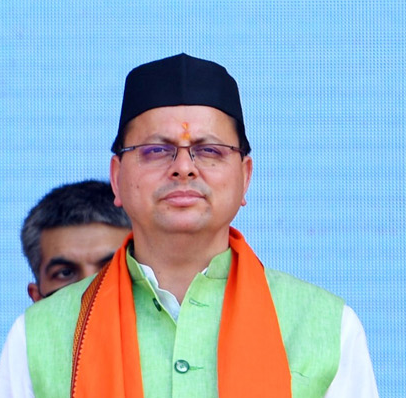
Chief Minister Dhami at the swearing in ceremony in 2022; Prime Minister Narendra Modi and Governor Gurmit Singh were also present in the event.

Dhami started his political career in 1990 with Akhil Bharatiya Vidyarthi Parishad, the student wing of the Rashtriya Swayamsevak Sangh. Pushkar Singh Dhami worked as a political adviser to former CM Bhagat Singh Koshyari.

He also served as the state president of the Bharatiya Janata Yuva Morcha twice between 2002 and 2008. On 2021, in political crisis Dhami to be considered as the deputy chief minister.

== Chief Minister of Uttarakhand ==
On 3 July 2021, he was sworn in as the 10th Chief Minister of Uttarakhand, after the resignation of Tirath Singh Rawat due to political crisis regarding his legitimacy to hold the post and assumed office on 4 July, after his swearing in ceremony at Raj Bhavan Dehradun. He became the youngest Chief Minister of Uttarakhand at the age of 45.

=== Vidhan Sabha election, 2022 ===
Pushkar Singh Dhami, the current chief minister and a CM face, lost the 2021 legislative election against congress candidate, Bhuwan Chandra Kapri from Khatima constituency of Uttarakhand legislative assembly. He was re-elected for the position of Chief Minister of Uttarakhand on 21 March 2022.

On 3 June 2022 he won the Champawat Assembly bypoll, which was allowed by the resignation of incumbent Kailash Chandra Gahtori by a landslide, securing over 93.5% of the total votes polled.

Controversies

Dhami faced criticism over his government's handling of Ankita Bhandari murder case. On 24 September 2022, Dhami publicly announced the demolition of Vanantara Resort, describing it as 'Bulldozer Justice' against the accused in a twitter post. The demolition took place before Ankita's body was recovered and prompted concerns about the possible destruction of forensic evidence.

In August 2026, CM Dhami defended local groups that "purified" and cleaned the venue after a rally by Congress president Mallikarjun Kharge. Dhami claimed the purification rituals were a symbolic protest against the content of Kharge's speech and not because of his caste background.

== Positions held ==
Year	Description
2012 - 2017	Elected to 3rd Uttarakhand Assembly (1st term): Member - Committee on Estimates (2012–17); Member - Committee on Government Assurances (2012–17)
2017 - 2022	Elected to 4th Uttarakhand Assembly (2nd term): Member - Committee on Government Assurances (2017–21); Member - Committee on Petitions (2017–21); 10th Chief Minister of Uttarakhand (4 July 2021 - 23 March 2022)
2022 - Till date	Elected to 5th Uttarakhand Assembly in by election (3rd term): 10th Chief Minister of Uttarakhand (23 March 2022 - Till date)

== Elections contested ==
=== Assembly By-election 2022 ===
2022 Uttarakhand Legislative Assembly by-election: Champawat
Party	Candidate	Votes	%	±%
BJP	Pushkar Singh Dhami	58,258	93.50%	▲43.24
INC	Nirmala Gahtori	3,233	5.19%	▼36.74
SP	Manoj Kumar Bhatt	413	0.66%	▲0.33
Independent	Himanshu Garkoti	402	0.65%	New
NOTA	None of the Above	377	0.61%	▼0.86
Margin of victory		55,025	88.31%	▲80.12
Turnout		62,306	64.43%	▼2.64
Registered electors		97,619		▲0.19
BJP hold		Swing	▲43.24	

=== Assembly Election 2022 ===
2022 Uttarakhand Legislative Assembly election: Khatima
Party	Candidate	Votes	%	±%
INC	Bhuwan Chandra Kapri	48,177	51.89%	▲18.85
BJP	Pushkar Singh Dhami	41,598	44.80%	▲8.43
BSP	Ramesh Singh	937	1.01%	▼20.91
AAP	Sawindarjeet Singh Kaler	764	0.82%	New
NOTA	None of the above	656	0.71%	▼0.39
Margin of victory		6,579	7.09%	▲3.75
Turnout		92,850	75.57%	▼0.91
Registered electors		1,22,870		▲15.70
INC gain from BJP		Swing	▲15.52	

=== Assembly Election 2017 ===
2017 Uttarakhand Legislative Assembly election: Khatima
Party	Candidate	Votes	%	±%
BJP	Pushkar Singh Dhami	29,539	36.37%	▲6.46
INC	Bhuwan Chandra Kapri	26,830	33.03%	▲10.96
BSP	Ramesh Singh Rana	17,804	21.92%	▲8.16
Independent	Dr. Lalit Singh	4,516	5.56%	New
NOTA	None of the above	890	1.10%	New
Independent	Ramesh Chandra Rana	452	0.56%	New
Margin of victory		2,709	3.34%	▼4.50
Turnout		81,223	76.48%	▲0.92
Registered electors		1,06,200		▲16.57
BJP hold		Swing	▲6.46	

=== Assembly Election 2012 ===
2012 Uttarakhand Legislative Assembly election: Khatima
Party	Candidate	Votes	%	±%
BJP	Pushkar Singh Dhami	20,586	29.91%	▲10.07
INC	Davendra Chand	15,192	22.07%	▼19.05
Independent	Ramesh Singh Rana	13,845	20.11%	New
BSP	Dr. G. C. Pandey	9,475	13.76%	▲2.10
SP	Kunwar Jaivardhan Singh	4,056	5.89%	▼0.34
Independent	Ramesh Chandar Joshi Urf Ramu Bhaya	1,804	2.62%	New
Maidani Kranti Dal	Chaudhary Sudeshpal Singh	640	0.93%	New
UKD	Vinod Chand	564	0.82%	▼17.16
Independent	Manvinder Singh Khaira	543	0.79%	New
Independent	Chetram	469	0.68%	New
Independent	Daya Krishna Joshi Urf Dayalu Guru	467	0.68%	New
Margin of victory		5,394	7.84%	▼13.45
Turnout		68,835	75.56%	▲8.38
Registered electors		91,104		
BJP gain from INC		Swing	▼11.21	

Political offices
Preceded by Tirath Singh Rawat	Chief Minister of Uttarakhand; 4 July 2021 - Present	Incumbent
