= Fakir Ram Tamta =

Indian politician (born 1963)

Fakir Ram Tamta (born 1963) is an Indian politician from Uttarakhand. He is an MLA from Gangolihat Assembly constituency in Pithoragarh district. He won as an MLA in the 2022 Uttarakhand Legislative Assembly election representing the Bharatiya Janata Party.

== Early life and education ==
Tamta is from Gangolihat, Pithoragarh district, Uttarakhand. He is the son of Dharam Ram. His eldest son Jagadish Tamta runs a puncture repair shop and his younger son Birendra Ram is a carpenter. Before he was elected as an MLA, Fakir Ram was also a carpenter.

== Career ==
Tamta won from Gangolihat Assembly constituency representing the Bharatiya Janata Party in the 2022 Uttarakhand Legislative Assembly election. He polled 32,296 votes and defeated his nearest rival, Khajan Chand 'Guddu' of Indian National Congress, by a margin of 10,053 votes. According to analysts, his victory was attributed to the rebellion of Former Congress two term MLA and veteran leader Narayan Ram Arya, who had subsequently switched over to the Bharatiya Janata Party after he was denied a ticket.
