= 2017 Uttarakhand Legislative Assembly election =

2017 assembly elections in Uttarakhand

- 15 February 2017

70 seats in the Uttarakhand Legislative Assembly 36 seats needed for a majority
- Turnout: 65.56% (▼0.61%)
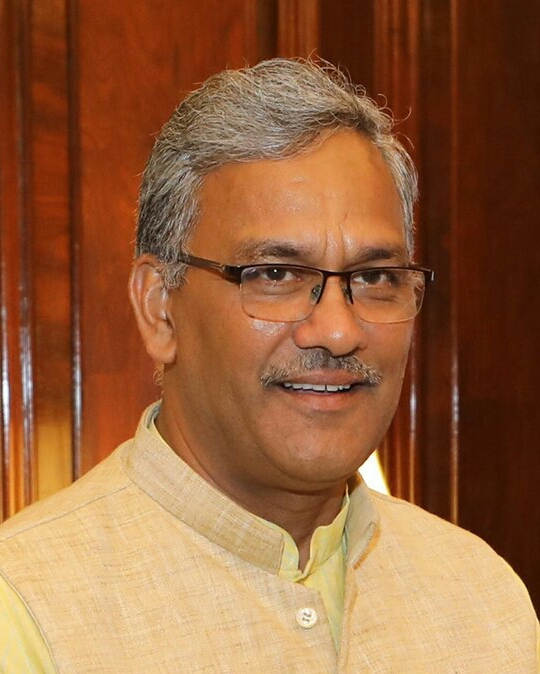

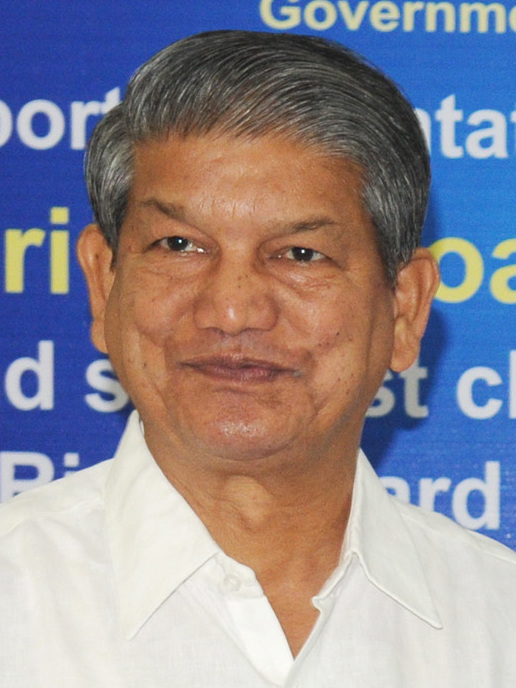
	Majority party	Minority party
Leader	Trivendra Singh Rawat	Harish Rawat
Party	BJP	INC
Leader since	2017	2014
Leader's seat	Doiwala (won)	Haridwar Rural, (lost); Kichha (lost)
Last election	31	32
Seats won	57	11
Seat change	▲26	▼21
Popular vote	23,12,912	16,65,664
Percentage	46.5%	33.5%
Swing	▲13.37%	▼0.29%
- Constituency-wise result of the 2017 Uttarakhand Legislative Assembly election

- Structure of the Uttarakhand Legislative Assembly after the election
Chief Minister before election
Harish Rawat
INC
Elected Chief Minister
Trivendra Singh Rawat
BJP

The 2017 Uttarakhand Legislative Assembly election was the 4th Vidhan Sabha (Legislative Assembly) election of the state of Uttarakhand in India. Elections were held on 15 February 2017 in a single phase for the 69 seats of the Uttarakhand Legislative Assembly. Voting in the Karnaprayag constituency was postponed until 9 March 2017 due to the death of BSP candidate Kuldeep Kanwasi in a road accident. The Bharatiya Janata Party emerged as the largest party, winning 57 seats in the 70-seat legislature. This marked the first time that a party got a supermajority in Uttarakhand. The Indian National Congress was reduced to 11 seats and became the official opposition.

The voter turnout for the 69 seats of Uttarakhand Legislative Assembly that was held on 15 February was 65.64% which is less than the last election's voter turnout of 66.85%.

== Schedule and electorate ==
The schedule for the Uttarakhand Assembly Election was announced by the Election Commission of India on 4 January 2017 and elections took place on 15 February 2017. 69 out of 70 ACs went on to the polls on the same day but the polls were postponed for Karnaprayag Assembly constituency to 9 March. The results were announced on 11 March 2017. Voter-verified paper audit trail (VVPAT) machines were used along with EVM in four assembly constituencies in Uttarakhand.

Event	Date	Day
Date for nominations	20 Jan 2017	Friday
Last Date for filing nominations	27 Jan 2017	Friday
Date for scrutiny of nominations	30 Jan 2017	Monday
Last date for withdrawal of candidatures	1 Feb 2017	Wednesday
Date of poll	15 Feb 2017	Wednesday
Date of counting	11 Mar 2017	Saturday
Date before which the election shall be completed	15 Mar 2017	Wednesday

Assembly constituencies of Uttarakhand having VVPAT facility with EVMs.
BHEL Ranipur	Dharampur	Haldwani	Rudrapur

=== Voter statistics ===
Source
Total	75,92,996
Male	39,23,492
Female	35,72,029
Third Gender	151
Service	97,324
Total Polling Station
10,854

== Parties and alliances ==
=== National Democratic Alliance ===
Party	Flag	Symbol	Leader	Contesting Seats
Bharatiya Janata Party			Trivendra Singh Rawat	70

=== United Progressive Alliance ===
Party	Flag	Symbol	Leader	Contesting Seats
Indian National Congress			Harish Rawat	70

=== Others ===
Party	flag	Symbol	Leader	Contesting Seats
Bahujan Samaj Party			Mayawati	69
Uttarakhand Kranti Dal			Kashi Singh Airy	63

== Opinion polls ==
Polling firm/Link/Portal	Survey Dates	INC	BJP	Others
Uttarakhand Post	10 January 2017	36	29	5
ABP News-Lokniti	5 January 2017	22-30 (26)	35-43 (39)	-
India Today-Axis	5 January 2017	18-23 (21)	41-46 (44)	2-6 (4)
India Today-Axis	14 October 2016	26-31 (29)	38-43 (41)	1-4 (3)
Polls Average		28	38	4

== Results ==
Result were declared on 11 March 2017.

Party	BJP	INC	Independent	BSP	Others
Leader	Trivendra Singh Rawat	Harish Rawat	N/A	Narayan Pal	N/A
Votes	46.5%,2314250	33.5%,1666379	10.0%,499674	7.0%,347533	3.0%,147658
Seats	57 (81.43%)	11 (15.71%)	2 (2.86%)	0 (0.0%)	0 (0.0%)
Seats	57 / 70	11 / 70	2 / 70	0 / 70	0 / 70

← Summary of the 15 February 2017 Uttarakhand Legislative Assembly election results
Parties and coalitions	Popular vote			Seats	
Parties and coalitions	Votes	%	±pp	Won	+/−
Bharatiya Janata Party (BJP)	2,314,250	46.5	▲13.4	57	▲26
Indian National Congress (INC)	1,666,379	33.5	▼0.3	11	▼21
Bahujan Samaj Party (BSP)	347,533	7.0	▼5.2	0	▼3
Uttarakhand Kranti Dal (UKD)	37,041	0.7	▼1.2	0	▼1
Samajwadi Party (SP)	18,202	0.4	▼1.0	0	Steady
Independents (IND)	499,674	10.0	▼2.3	2	▼1
None of the Above (NOTA)	50,439	1.0	—N/a		
Total	4,975,494	100.00		70	±0
Valid votes	49,75,494	99.72			
Invalid votes	14,196	0.28			
Votes cast / turnout	49,89,690	65.60			
Abstentions	26,16,998	34.40			
Registered voters	76,06,688				

=== Results by division ===
Divisions	Seats			
Divisions	Seats	BJP	INC	OTH
Garhwal	41	34	6	1
Kumaon	29	23	5	1
Total	70	57	11	2

=== Results by district ===
Divisions	Seats			
Divisions	Seats	BJP	INC	OTH
Garhwal Division
Uttarkashi	3	2	1	—N/a
Chamoli	3	3	—N/a	—N/a
Rudraprayag	2	1	1	—N/a
Tehri Garhwal	6	5	—N/a	1
Dehradun	10	9	1	—N/a
Haridwar	11	8	3	—N/a
Pauri Garhwal	6	6	—N/a	—N/a
Kumaon Division
Pithoragarh	4	3	1	—N/a
Bageshwar	2	2	—N/a	—N/a
Almora	6	4	2	—N/a
Champawat	2	2	—N/a	—N/a
Nainital	6	4	1	1
Udham Singh Nagar	9	8	1	—N/a
Total	70	57	11	2

== Results by constituency ==
Results
Assembly Constituency		Turnout (%)	Winner				Runner Up				Margin
#	Name	Turnout (%)	Candidate	Party	Votes	%	Candidate	Party	Votes	%	Margin
Uttarkashi District
1	Purola	73.38	Rajkumar	INC	17,798	36.49	Mal Chand	BJP	16,785	34.41	1,013
2	Yamunotri	66.91	Kedar Singh Rawat	BJP	19,800	42.41	Sanjay Dobhal	INC	13,840	29.64	5,960
3	Gangotri	67.53	Gopal Singh Rawat	BJP	25,683	46.93	Vijaypal Singh Sajwan	INC	16,073	29.37	9,610
Chamoli District
4	Badrinath	62.32	Mahendra Bhatt	BJP	29,676	47.31	Rajendra Singh Bhandari	INC	24,042	38.33	5,634
5	Tharali	57.17	Magan Lal Shah	BJP	25,931	45.37	Prof. Jeet Ram	INC	21,073	36.87	4,864
6	Karnaprayag	56.57	Surendra Singh Negi	BJP	28,159	52.50	Anusuya Prasad Maikhuri	INC	20,610	38.42	7,549
Rudraprayag District
7	Kedarnath	65.25	Manoj Rawat	INC	13,906	25.06	Kuldip Singh Rawat	IND	13,037	23.49	869
8	Rudraprayag	58.96	Bharat Singh Chaudhary	BJP	29,333	51.54	Lakshmi Singh Rana	INC	14,701	25.83	16,632
Tehri Garhwal District
9	Ghansali	49.03	Shakti Lal Shah	BJP	22,103	50.46	Dhani Lal Shah	IND	10,450	23.86	11,653
10	Devprayag	53.03	Vinod Kandari	BJP	13,824	31.97	Diwakar Bhatt	IND	10,325	23.97	3,499
11	Narendranagar	53.03	Subodh Uniyal	BJP	24,104	46.37	Om Gopal Rawat	IND	19,132	36.81	4,972
12	Pratapnagar	51.23	Vijay Singh Panwar	BJP	15,058	36.93	Vikram Singh Negi	INC	13,119	32.17	1,939
13	Tehri	54.65	Dhan Singh Negi	BJP	20,896	47.62	Dinesh Dhanai	IND	14,056	32.02	6,840
14	Dhanaulti	64.42	Pritam Singh Panwar	IND	17,811	36.45	Narayan Singh Rana	BJP	16,196	33.14	1,615
Dehradun District
15	Chakrata	72.19	Pritam Singh	INC	34,968	48.91	Madhu Chauhan	BJP	33,425	46.75	1,543
16	Vikasnagar	70.58	Munna Singh Chauhan	BJP	38,895	50.76	Nav Prabhat	INC	32,477	42.38	6,508
17	Sahaspur	72.80	Sahdev Singh Pundir	BJP	44,055	40.75	Kishore Upadhyaya	INC	25,192	23.30	18,863
18	Dharampur	57.43	Vinod Chamoli	BJP	53,828	50.96	Dinesh Agrawal	INC	42,875	40.59	10,953
19	Raipur	59.64	Umesh Sharma 'Kau'	BJP	59,764	61.07	Prabhulal Bahuguna	INC	22,993	23.49	36,771
20	Rajpur Road	57.97	Khajan Dass	BJP	36,601	53.22	Raj Kumar	INC	27,969	40.67	8,632
21	Dehradun Cantonment	57.07	Harbans Kapoor	BJP	41,142	56.98	Suryakant Dhasmana	INC	24,472	33.89	16,670
22	Mussoorie	57.91	Ganesh Joshi	BJP	41,322	55.14	Godavari Thapli	INC	29,245	39.02	12,077
23	Doiwala	67.83	Trivendra Singh Rawat	BJP	58,502	61.08	Hira Singh Bisht	INC	33,633	35.11	24,869
24	Rishikesh	64.70	Premchand Aggarwal	BJP	45,082	46.20	Rajpal Kharola	INC	30,281	31.03	14,801
Haridwar District
25	Haridwar	65.18	Madan Kaushik	BJP	61,742	66.45	Brahmaswarup Brahmachari	INC	25,815	27.78	35,927
26	BHEL Ranipur	70.65	Adesh Chauhan	BJP	56,644	54.84	Ambrish Kumar	INC	34,404	33.31	22,240
27	Jwalapur	66.91	Suresh Rathod	BJP	29,513	34.22	S. P. Singh 'Engineer'	INC	24,725	28.67	4,788
28	Bhagwanpur	80.02	Mamta Rakesh	INC	44,882	48.36	Subodh Rakesh	BJP	42,369	45.66	2,513
29	Jhabrera	76.28	Deshraj Karnwal	BJP	32,146	38.25	Rajpal Singh	INC	29,893	35.57	2,253
30	Piran Kaliyar	81.52	Furqan Ahmad	INC	29,243	32.43	Jai Bhagwan	BJP	27,894	30.93	1,349
31	Roorkee	63.84	Pradip Batra	BJP	40,000	55.58	Suresh Chand Jain	INC	27,458	38.16	12,542
32	Khanpur	76.28	Kunwar Pranav Singh 'Champion'	BJP	53,192	49.89	Riyasat Ali	BSP	39,457	37.01	13,735
33	Manglaur	78.22	Muhammad Nizamuddin	INC	31,352	38.75	Sarwat Karim Ansari	BSP	28,684	35.45	2,668
34	Laksar	81.94	Sanjay Gupta	BJP	25,248	32.46	Taslim Ahmad	INC	23,644	30.40	1,604
35	Haridwar Rural	81.71	Yatishwaranand	BJP	44,964	46.08	Harish Rawat	INC	32,686	33.50	12,278
Pauri Garhwal District
36	Yamkeshwar	52.70	Ritu Khanduri Bhushan	BJP	19,671	43.96	Renu Bisht	IND	10,689	23.89	8,982
37	Pauri	51.83	Mukesh Singh Koli	BJP	24,469	55.19	Naval Kishor	INC	19,439	40.53	7,030
38	Srinagar	57.12	Dr. Dhan Singh Rawat	BJP	30,816	51.84	Ganesh Godiyal	INC	22,118	37.21	8,698
39	Chaubattakhal	48.16	Satpal Maharaj	BJP	20,931	31.23	Rajpal Singh Bisht	INC	13,567	16.93	7,354
40	Lansdowne	47.87	Dilip Singh Rawat	BJP	22,246	54.78	Tejpal Singh Rawat	INC	15,771	38.83	6,475
41	Kotdwar	68.67	Harak Singh Rawat	BJP	39,859	56.06	Surendra Singh Negi	INC	28,541	40.14	11,318
Pithoragarh District
42	Dharchula	62.63	Harish Singh Dhami	INC	25,597	47.28	Virendra Singh Pal	BJP	22,512	41.58	3,085
43	Didihat	61.11	Bishan Singh Chuphal	BJP	17,392	33.61	Kishan Bhandari	IND	15,024	29.04	2,368
44	Pithoragarh	62.41	Prakash Pant	BJP	32,941	49.16	Mayukh Singh Mahar	INC	30,257	45.15	2,684
45	Gangolihat	54.92	Meena Gangola	BJP	20,418	37.06	Narayan Ram Arya	INC	19,613	35.60	805
Bageshwar District
46	Kapkot	61.78	Balwant Singh Bhauryal	BJP	27,213	46.39	Lalit Pharswan	INC	21,231	36.19	5,982
47	Bageshwar	59.86	Chandan Ram Das	BJP	33,792	51.24	Bal Krishna	INC	19,225	29.15	14,567
Almora District
48	Dwarahat		Mahesh Singh Negi	BJP	20,221		Madan Singh Bisht	INC	13,628		6,593
49	Salt		Surendra Singh Jeena	BJP	21,581		Ganga Pancholi	INC	18,677		2,904
50	Ranikhet		Karan Mahra	INC	19,035		Ajay Bhatt	BJP	14,054		4,981
51	Someshwar		Rekha Arya	BJP	23,107		Rajendra Barakoti	INC	22,397		710
52	Almora		Raghunath Singh Chauhan	BJP	26,464		Manoj Tiwari	INC	21,085		5,379
53	Jageshwar		Govind Singh Kunjwal	INC	24,132		Subhash Pandey	BJP	23,733		399
Champawat District
54	Lohaghat		Puran Singh Phartyal	BJP	26,468		Khushal Singh	INC	26,320		848
55	Champawat		Kailash Chandra Gahtori	BJP	36,601		Hemesh Kharkwal	INC	19,241		17,360
Nainital District
56	Lalkuan		Navin Chandra Dumka	BJP	44,293		Harish Chandra Durgapal	INC	17,185		27,108
57	Bhimtal		Ram Singh Kaira	IND	18,878		Govind Singh Bisht	BJP	15,432		3,446
58	Nainital		Sanjiv Arya	BJP	30,036		Sarita Arya	INC	22,789		7,247
59	Haldwani		Indira Hridayesh	INC	43,786		Dr. Jogendra Pal Singh Rautela	BJP	37,229		6,557
60	Kaladhungi		Banshidhar Bhagat	BJP	45,704		Prakash Joshi	INC	25,107		20,597
61	Ramnagar		Diwan Singh Bisht	BJP	35,839		Ranjit Singh Rawat	INC	27,228		8,611
Udham Singh Nagar District
62	Jaspur		Adesh Singh Chauhan	INC	42,551		Dr. Shailendra Mohan Singhal	BJP	38,347		4,204
63	Kashipur		Harbhajan Singh Cheema	BJP	50,156		Manoj Joshi	INC	30,042		20,114
64	Bajpur		Yashpal Arya	BJP	54,965		Sunita Tamta	INC	42,329		12,636
65	Gadarpur		Arvind Pandey	BJP	41,530		Rajendra Pal Singh	INC	27,424		14,106
66	Rudrapur		Rajkumar Thukral	BJP	68,754		Tilak Raj Behar	INC	43,983		24,771
67	Kichha		Rajesh Shukla	BJP	40,363		Harish Rawat	INC	38,236		2,127
68	Sitarganj		Saurabh Bahuguna	BJP	50,597		Malti Biswas	INC	22,147		28,450
69	Nanakmatta		Prem Singh Rana	BJP	42,785		Gopal Singh Rana	INC	33,254		9,531
70	Khatima		Pushkar Singh Dhami	BJP	29,539		Bhuwan Chandra Kapri	INC	26,830		2,709

== List of elected Assembly members ==
Complete list of winners with the margin of winning votes.

S. No.	Constituency	Elected Member	Party affiliation
1	Purola (SC)	Raj Kumar	INC
2	Yamunotri	Kedar Singh Rawat	BJP
3	Gangotri	Gopal Singh Rawat	BJP
4	Badrinath	Mahendra Bhatt	BJP
5	Tharali (SC)	Magan Lal Shah	BJP
6	Karnaprayag	Surendra Singh Negi	BJP
7	Kedarnath	Manoj Rawat	INC
8	Rudraprayag	Bharat Singh Chaudhary	BJP
9	Ghansali (SC)	Shakti Lal Shah	BJP
10	Devprayag	Vinod Kandari	BJP
11	Narendranagar	Subodh Uniyal	BJP
12	Pratapnagar	Vijay Singh Panwar	BJP
13	Tehri	Dhan Singh Negi	BJP
14	Dhanaulti	Pritam Singh Panwar	Independent
15	Chakrata (ST)	Pritam Singh	INC
16	Vikasnagar	Munna Singh Chauhan	BJP
17	Sahaspur	Sahdev Singh Pundir	BJP
18	Dharampur	Vinod Chamoli	BJP
19	Raipur	Umesh Sharma 'Kau'	BJP
20	Rajpur Road (SC)	Khajan Dass	BJP
21	Dehradun Cantonment	Harbans Kapoor	BJP
22	Mussoorie	Ganesh Joshi	BJP
23	Doiwala	Trivendra Singh Rawat	BJP
24	Rishikesh	Premchand Aggarwal	BJP
25	Haridwar	Madan Kaushik	BJP
26	BHEL Ranipur	Adesh Chauhan	BJP
27	Jwalapur (SC)	Suresh Rathod	BJP
28	Bhagwanpur (SC)	Mamta Rakesh	INC
29	Jhabrera (SC)	Deshraj Karnwal	BJP
30	Piran Kaliyar	Furqan Ahmad	INC
31	Roorkee	Pradip Batra	BJP
32	Khanpur	Pranav Singh 'Champion'	BJP
33	Manglaur	Muhammad Nizamuddin	INC
34	Laksar	Sanjay Gupta	BJP
35	Haridwar Rural	Yatishwaranand	BJP
36	Yamkeshwar	Ritu Khanduri Bhushan	BJP
37	Pauri (SC)	Mukesh Singh Koli	BJP
38	Srinagar	Dr. Dhan Singh Rawat	BJP
39	Chaubattakhal	Satpal Maharaj	BJP
40	Lansdowne	Dilip Singh Rawat	BJP
41	Kotdwar	Dr. Harak Singh Rawat	BJP
42	Dharchula	Harish Singh Dhami	INC
43	Didihat	Bishan Singh Chuphal	BJP
44	Pithoragarh	Prakash Pant	BJP
45	Gangolihat (SC)	Mina Gangola	BJP
46	Kapkot	Balwant Singh Bhauryal	BJP
47	Bageshwar (SC)	Chandan Ram Das	BJP
48	Dwarahat	Mahesh Singh Negi	BJP
49	Salt	Surendra Singh Jeena	BJP
50	Ranikhet	Karan Mahara	INC
51	Someshwar (SC)	Rekha Arya	BJP
52	Almora	Raghunath Singh Chauhan	BJP
53	Jageshwar	Govind Singh Kunjwal	INC
54	Lohaghat	Puran Singh Phartyal	BJP
55	Champawat	Kailash Chandra Gahtori	BJP
56	Lalkuan	Navin Chandra Dumka	BJP
57	Bhimtal	Ram Singh Kaira	Independent
58	Nainital (SC)	Sanjiv Arya	BJP
59	Haldwani	Dr. Indira Hridayesh	INC
60	Kaladhungi	Banshidhar Bhagat	BJP
61	Ramnagar	Diwan Singh Bisht	BJP
62	Jaspur	Adesh Singh Chauhan	INC
63	Kashipur	Harbhajan Singh Cheema	BJP
64	Bajpur (SC)	Yashpal Arya	BJP
65	Gadarpur	Arvind Pandey	BJP
66	Rudrapur	Rajkumar Thukral	BJP
67	Kichha	Rajesh Shukla	BJP
68	Sitarganj	Saurabh Bahuguna	BJP
69	Nanakmatta (ST)	Dr. Prem Singh Rana	BJP
70	Khatima	Pushkar Singh Dhami	BJP

== See also ==
- 4th Uttarakhand Assembly
- Trivendra Singh Rawat ministry
- Tirath Singh Rawat ministry
- First Dhami ministry
- Elections in Uttarakhand
- Politics of Uttarakhand
- 2017 elections in India
