= Sahdev Singh Pundir =

Indian politician

Member of the Uttarakhand Legislative Assembly
- Incumbent
- Assumed office 2012
- Preceded by: Rajkumar
- Constituency: Sahaspur

Personal details
- Party: Bharatiya Janata Party

Sahdev Singh Pundir is an Indian politician and member of the Bharatiya Janata Party. Pundir is a member of the Uttarakhand Legislative Assembly from the Sahaspur constituency in Dehradun district. He holds a bachelor's degree in arts. Pundir has been vice-president of the BJP State Unit.

== Electoral performance ==
Election	Constituency	Party	Result	Votes %	Opposition Candidate	Opposition Party	Opposition vote %	Ref
2022	Sahaspur	BJP	Won	50.86%	Aryendra Sharma	INC	44.22%	
2017	Sahaspur	BJP	Won	40.42%	Kishore Upadhaya	INC	23.11%	
2012	Sahaspur	BJP	Won	31.24%	Aryendra Sharma	INC	24.66%	
2007	Mussoorie	BJP	Lost	28.14%	Jot Singh Gunsola	INC	31.15%	
2002	Vikasnagar	BJP	Lost	16.34%	Nav Prabhat	INC	16.93%	

== Early career ==
Sahadev Singh Pundir was born in Uttarakhand, India. He completed his Bachelor of Arts (BA) degree from DAV PG College, Dehradun, which is affiliated with Hemwati Nandan Bahuguna Garhwal University. During his time at the college, Pundir was actively engaged in campus life and participated in various student activities. His involvement in student politics during this period marked the beginning of his interest in public affairs. Following his academic studies, he transitioned into a political career, drawing on his early experiences in student leadership and activism.

== Growth of Pundir's Assets (2012-2022) ==
From 2012 to 2022, Pundir's assets are reported to have grown significantly, with some sources indicating an increase from ₹73 lakhs to approximately ₹3.3 crores, a nearly threefold rise over the decade.

However, this sharp increase in wealth has raised questions, particularly regarding the disparity between Pundir's reported monthly salary of around ₹1 lakh and the rapid growth of his assets. Critics have pointed out that such a dramatic rise in wealth appears inconsistent with his known income, suggesting potential concerns about the sources of his financial gains. These critics have called for greater transparency regarding the origins of Pundir's wealth, questioning whether it can be attributed solely to salary or if other undisclosed sources may be involved. The situation has led to ongoing scrutiny and speculation about the nature of his financial activities.

In addition to the reported growth in his assets, Pundir's family is also known to own a Mahindra Thar, Range Rover, Toyota Fortuner and several other luxury cars. This has further fueled concerns regarding the sources of his wealth. A senior member of the Indian National Congress of Uttarakhand State Unit raised questions about the extent of Pundir's accumulated wealth, asking how much he must have acquired and from whom. The senior member also pointed out the apparent contradiction between Pundir's affluent lifestyle and the low standards of living experienced by many people in his constituency, suggesting a potential disconnect between his personal prosperity and the well-being of his constituents.

In a series of allegations reported by Congress in its papers, Pundir has been accused of owning crores worth of undeclared assets across the Dehradun district. The party claims that his family is involved in illegal mining activities, particularly in areas like Kalsi. They also allege that Pundir operates trucks filled with mining materials every night to avoid detection. Furthermore, the allegations highlight Pundir's lavish bungalow, which is referred to as "Uttarakhand's Whitehouse," complete with a large parking area. These accusations of undeclared assets and illegal activities have caused political uproar in the region.

== Allegations of Media Control and Suppression of Criticism ==
Sahadev Singh Pundir has faced criticism regarding his alleged influence over local media outlets and online platforms. Some reports claim that Pundir has used his control over certain media channels to suppress critical voices and limit the discussion of his achievements. According to these sources, Pundir has been accused of promoting smaller websites that focus on lauding his accomplishments while potentially reducing the visibility of independent or critical coverage.

These websites are often described as having poor design and low-quality content, with some critics suggesting that they appear "spammy" and may track user data for marketing purposes. Some observers believe this could explain why these sites are poorly ranked by search engines like Google, which reportedly de-indexes such sites due to their low user satisfaction, incoherent content, and lack of reliable backlinks. Search engines generally prioritize sites that are user-friendly, authoritative, and have strong SEO practices, all of which are purportedly lacking in these sites.

However, evidence of Pundir’s direct involvement in these media activities remains inconclusive. While critics argue that these sites serve as vehicles for self-promotion, there is limited information from independent sources to substantiate claims of coordinated media manipulation or suppression of dissenting views.

As of September 2024, the effectiveness of these sites in influencing public opinion or media coverage appears to be minimal, due to their technical limitations and lower visibility in search engine results.

== Controversies and criticism ==
Sahdev Singh Pundir has faced criticism from various foreign media outlets and embassies regarding his handling of local employment and business matters in his constituency. Allegations have emerged suggesting that certain individuals, who are reportedly linked to Pundir, have engaged in activities that have hindered the operations of businesses in the area. These activities are said to include attempts to intimidate local entrepreneurs, with some claiming that these individuals have harassed business owners, labeling them as "outsiders" in an effort to reduce competition.

Furthermore, Pundir has been accused of influencing local officials and political figures to obstruct the approval of business licenses for entrepreneurs who were seeking to create jobs and contribute to the local economy. This situation has led to widespread public discontent, with many local residents voicing their frustration. The majority of people in the area have expressed a loss of trust in Pundir's leadership and have instead encouraged both domestic and foreign businessmen and investors to step in and help develop the city. Critics argue that the lack of support for genuine business efforts has hindered economic growth and employment opportunities, leading to calls for a change in leadership and governance.

In response to growing pressure, Pundir was compelled to repair local roads and make improvements to infrastructure, ostensibly to demonstrate that the area was open to business. However, despite these efforts, locals continued to criticize his leadership, maintaining that the broader issues of employment and business support remained unresolved.
