= Jaspur Assembly constituency =

Legislative assembly constituency in Uttarakhand, India

Coordinates: 29.28°N 78.82°E

Jaspur
- Constituency No. 62 for the Uttarakhand Legislative Assembly

Constituency details
- Country: India
- Region: North India
- State: Uttarakhand
- District: Udham Singh Nagar
- Lok Sabha constituency: Nainital–Udhamsingh Nagar
- Total electors: 132,654
- Reservation: None

Member of Legislative Assembly
- 5th Uttarakhand Legislative Assembly
- Incumbent Adesh Singh Chauhan
- Party: Indian National Congress
- Elected year: 2022

Jaspur Legislative Assembly constituency is one of the 70 Legislative Assembly constituencies of Uttarakhand state in India.

It is part of Udham Singh Nagar district.

== Members of the Legislative Assembly ==
| Election | Member | Party |
|---|---|---|
| 2002 | Dr. Shailendra Mohan Singhal | Independent politician |
| 2007 | Dr. Shailendra Mohan Singhal | Indian National Congress |
| 2012 | Dr. Shailendra Mohan Singhal | Indian National Congress |
| 2017 | Adesh Singh Chauhan | Indian National Congress |
| 2022 | Adesh Singh Chauhan | Indian National Congress |

== Election results ==
=== 2027 Assembly election ===
2027 Uttarakhand Legislative Assembly election: Jaspur
| Party | Candidate | Votes | % | ±% |
|---|---|---|---|---|
| INC | | | | |
| BJP | | | | |
| NOTA | None of the above | | | |
| Majority | | | | |
| Turnout | | | | |
| gain from | | Swing | | |

=== Assembly Election 2022 ===
2022 Uttarakhand Legislative Assembly election: Jaspur
| Party | Candidate | Votes | % | ±% |
|---|---|---|---|---|
| INC | Adesh Singh Chauhan | 42,886 | 43.81% | ▼2.51 |
| BJP | Dr. Shailendra Mohan Singhal | 38,714 | 39.55% | ▼2.19 |
| AAP | Mohd Yoonus Chaudhari | 9,454 | 9.66% | New |
| BSP | Ajay Agarwal | 5,061 | 5.17% | ▼4.26 |
| NOTA | None of the above | 476 | 0.49% | ▼0.21 |
| Margin of victory | | 4,172 | 4.26% | ▼0.31 |
| Turnout | | 97,893 | 73.53% | ▼5.83 |
| Registered electors | | 1,33,136 | | ▲15.01 |
| INC hold | | Swing | ▼2.51 | |

=== Assembly Election 2017 ===
2017 Uttarakhand Legislative Assembly election: Jaspur
| Party | Candidate | Votes | % | ±% |
|---|---|---|---|---|
| INC | Adesh Singh Chauhan | 42,551 | 46.32% | ▲12.98 |
| BJP | Dr. Shailendra Mohan Singhal | 38,347 | 41.74% | ▲13.53 |
| BSP | Mohammad Umar | 8,666 | 9.43% | ▼20.28 |
| NOTA | None of the above | 644 | 0.70% | New |
| Independent | Km. Seema Chauhan | 578 | 0.63% | New |
| Margin of victory | | 4,204 | 4.58% | ▲0.95 |
| Turnout | | 91,869 | 79.36% | ▲1.88 |
| Registered electors | | 1,15,764 | | ▲17.12 |
| INC hold | | Swing | ▲12.98 | |

=== Assembly Election 2012 ===
2012 Uttarakhand Legislative Assembly election: Jaspur
| Party | Candidate | Votes | % | ±% |
|---|---|---|---|---|
| INC | Dr. Shailendra Mohan Singhal | 25,533 | 33.34% | ▼0.89 |
| BSP | Mohammad Umar | 22,753 | 29.71% | ▲20.88 |
| BJP | Adesh Singh Chauhan | 21,604 | 28.21% | ▲16.23 |
| SP | Sultan Bharti | 4,021 | 5.25% | ▼6.84 |
| Independent | Shahnawaz | 615 | 0.80% | New |
| Independent | Chandrapal Singh | 576 | 0.75% | New |
| Margin of victory | | 2,780 | 3.63% | ▼12.34 |
| Turnout | | 76,584 | 77.48% | ▲3.03 |
| Registered electors | | 98,839 | | |
| INC hold | | Swing | ▼0.89 | |

=== Assembly Election 2007 ===
2007 Uttarakhand Legislative Assembly election: Jaspur
| Party | Candidate | Votes | % | ±% |
|---|---|---|---|---|
| INC | Dr. Shailendra Mohan Singhal | 25,063 | 34.23% | ▲10.63 |
| Independent | Mohammad Umar | 13,368 | 18.26% | New |
| SP | Abdul Hafeez | 8,851 | 12.09% | ▲1.67 |
| BJP | Surendra Singh Chouhan | 8,770 | 11.98% | ▼2.06 |
| BSP | Adesh Kumar Chouhan | 6,463 | 8.83% | ▲0.27 |
| Independent | Shyam Singh Gehlot | 4,002 | 5.47% | New |
| Independent | Vishvjeet Singh | 1,396 | 1.91% | New |
| Independent | Usha Rani | 1,351 | 1.85% | New |
| Independent | Mohd. Javed | 714 | 0.98% | New |
| Independent | Geeta | 482 | 0.66% | New |
| Margin of victory | | 11,695 | 15.97% | ▲13.50 |
| Turnout | | 73,223 | 74.48% | ▲9.46 |
| Registered electors | | 98,342 | | |
| INC gain from Independent | | Swing | ▲8.16 | |

=== Assembly Election 2002 ===
2002 Uttaranchal Legislative Assembly election: Jaspur
| Party | Candidate | Votes | % | ±% |
|---|---|---|---|---|
| Independent | Dr. Shailendra Mohan Singhal | 13,897 | 26.07% | New |
| INC | Adbul Hafij | 12,580 | 23.60% | New |
| BJP | Rajiv Kumar | 7,485 | 14.04% | New |
| SP | Manoj Joshi | 5,556 | 10.42% | New |
| BSP | Aasad Ali | 4,562 | 8.56% | New |
| Independent | Usha Rani | 2,097 | 3.93% | New |
| LJP | Anandpal Singh | 1,774 | 3.33% | New |
| Rashtriya Kisan Party | Puran Singh | 1,357 | 2.55% | New |
| Independent | Rajesh Kumar | 1,107 | 2.08% | New |
| SJP(R) | Dulla Khan | 825 | 1.55% | New |
| CPI | Babu Singh | 675 | 1.27% | New |
| Margin of victory | | 1,317 | 2.47% | |
| Turnout | | 53,315 | 65.00% | |
| Registered electors | | 82,024 | | |
| Independent win (new seat) | | | | |

== See also ==
- List of constituencies of the Uttarakhand Legislative Assembly
- Udham Singh Nagar district
