= Champawat Assembly constituency =

Legislative assembly constituency in Uttarakhand, India

Coordinates: 29.33°N 80.09°E

Champawat
- Constituency No. 55 for the Uttarakhand Legislative Assembly

Constituency details
- Country: India
- Region: North India
- State: Uttarakhand
- District: Champawat
- Lok Sabha constituency: Almora
- Total electors: 96,016
- Reservation: None

Member of Legislative Assembly
- 5th Uttarakhand Legislative Assembly
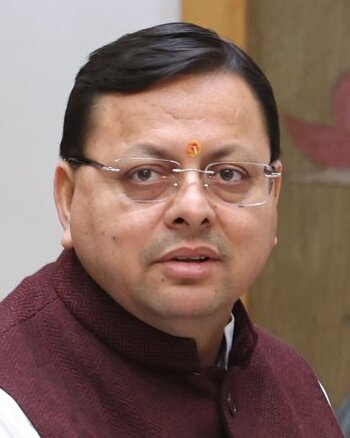
- Incumbent Pushkar Singh Dhami; Chief Minister of Uttarakhand
- Party: BJP
- Elected year: 2022

Champawat Legislative Assembly constituency is one of the 70 Legislative Assembly constituencies of Uttarakhand state in India. It is a part of Almora Lok Sabha constituency. Chief minister of state represents this constituency.

== Members of the Legislative Assembly ==
| Year | Name | Party |
|---|---|---|
| 2002 | Hemesh Kharkwal | Indian National Congress |
| 2007 | Veena Maharana | Bharatiya Janata Party |
| 2012 | Hemesh Kharkwal | Indian National Congress |
| 2017 | Kailash Chandra Gahtori | Bharatiya Janata Party |
| 2022 | Kailash Chandra Gahtori | Bharatiya Janata Party |
| 2022 By-election | Pushkar Singh Dhami | Bharatiya Janata Party |

== Election results ==
=== 2027 Assembly election ===
2027 Uttarakhand Legislative Assembly election: Champawat
| Party | Candidate | Votes | % | ±% |
|---|---|---|---|---|
| BJP | | | | |
| INC | | | | |
| NOTA | None of the above | | | |
| Majority | | | | |
| Turnout | | | | |
| gain from | | Swing | | |

=== Assembly By-election 2022 ===
In the 2022 Uttarakhand Legislative Assembly election, Pushkar Singh Dhami lost from his Khatima seat. In order to continue as the Chief Minister, Dhami had to win as an MLA from another seat, within 6 months. To enable this, Kailash Chandra Gahtori resigned from his seat, and by-elections were called for. Pushkar Singh Dhami won the Champawat by-poll with a record margin of over 55,000 votes. This was the biggest victory in the state in terms of both votes and vote percentage of a legislative assembly constituency.

2022 Uttarakhand Legislative Assembly by-election: Champawat
| Party | Candidate | Votes | % | ±% |
|---|---|---|---|---|
| BJP | Pushkar Singh Dhami | 58,258 | 93.50 | ▲43.24 |
| INC | Nirmala Gahtori | 3,233 | 5.19 | ▼36.74 |
| SP | Manoj Kumar Bhatt | 413 | 0.66 | ▲0.33 |
| Independent | Himanshu Garkoti | 402 | 0.65 | New |
| NOTA | None of the Above | 377 | 0.61 | ▼0.86 |
| Margin of victory | | 55,025 | 88.31 | ▲80.12 |
| Turnout | | 62,306 | 64.43 | ▼2.64 |
| Registered electors | | 97,619 | | ▲0.19 |
| BJP hold | | Swing | ▲43.24 | |

=== Assembly Election 2022 ===
2022 Uttarakhand Legislative Assembly election: Champawat
| Party | Candidate | Votes | % | ±% |
|---|---|---|---|---|
| BJP | Kailash Chandra Gahtori | 32,547 | 50.26 | ▼11.80 |
| INC | Hemesh Kharkwal | 27,243 | 42.07 | ▲9.45 |
| AAP | Madan Singh Mahar | 2,557 | 3.95 | New |
| NOTA | Nota | 946 | 1.46 | New |
| BSP | Rakesh Chandra Verma | 506 | 0.78 | ▼0.79 |
| Independent | Jagdish Bhatt | 465 | 0.72 | New |
| Independent | Deepak Belwal | 280 | 0.43 | New |
| SP | Mohammad Haarun | 207 | 0.33 | New |
| Margin of victory | | 5,304 | 8.19 | ▼21.24 |
| Turnout | | 64,755 | 66.46 | ▲0.03 |
| Registered electors | | 97,430 | | ▲9.74 |
| BJP hold | | Swing | ▼11.80 | |

=== Assembly Election 2017 ===
2017 Uttarakhand Legislative Assembly election: Champawat
| Party | Candidate | Votes | % | ±% |
|---|---|---|---|---|
| BJP | Kailash Chandra Gahtori | 36,601 | 62.06 | ▲44.90 |
| INC | Hemesh Kharkwal | 19,241 | 32.62 | ▼7.89 |
| NOTA | None of the Above | 1,044 | 1.77 | New |
| UKD | Trilok Chand Sorari | 939 | 1.59 | ▼2.48 |
| BSP | Dinesh Chandra | 928 | 1.57 | ▼25.08 |
| Margin of victory | | 17,360 | 29.43 | ▲15.58 |
| Turnout | | 58,979 | 66.43 | ▲0.67 |
| Registered electors | | 88,781 | | ▲16.34 |
| BJP gain from INC | | Swing | ▲21.55 | |

=== Assembly Election 2012 ===
2012 Uttarakhand Legislative Assembly election: Champawat
| Party | Candidate | Votes | % | ±% |
|---|---|---|---|---|
| INC | Hemesh Kharkwal | 20,330 | 40.51 | ▲11.51 |
| BSP | Madan Singh | 13,377 | 26.65 | ▲20.95 |
| BJP | Haripriya Joshi Alias Hema Joshi | 8,610 | 17.16 | ▼24.74 |
| Independent | Pan Dev | 2,661 | 5.30 | New |
| UKD | Harshvardhan Singh | 2,042 | 4.07 | ▲1.31 |
| Independent | Lila Wati Gahtori | 867 | 1.73 | New |
| Independent | Rakesh Agarwal | 824 | 1.64 | New |
| SP | Manoj Kumar Bhatt | 430 | 0.86 | ▼0.56 |
| Independent | Tahir Husen | 382 | 0.76 | New |
| Independent | Kailash Chandra Ray | 245 | 0.49 | New |
| Independent | Anand Prakash Gupta | 209 | 0.42 | New |
| AITC | Shyam Sundar Singh | 207 | 0.41 | New |
| Margin of victory | | 6,953 | 13.85 | ▲0.96 |
| Turnout | | 50,187 | 65.77 | ▲0.96 |
| Registered electors | | 76,311 | | ▼9.64 |
| INC gain from BJP | | Swing | ▼1.39 | |

=== Assembly Election 2007 ===
2007 Uttarakhand Legislative Assembly election: Champawat
| Party | Candidate | Votes | % | ±% |
|---|---|---|---|---|
| BJP | Veena Maharana | 22,928 | 41.90 | ▲21.99 |
| INC | Hemesh Kharkwal | 15,870 | 29.00 | ▲7.45 |
| Independent | Bahadur Singh Patni | 6,220 | 11.37 | New |
| BSP | Tahir Husen | 3,120 | 5.70 | ▼0.73 |
| Independent | Rajendra Kumar | 1,781 | 3.25 | New |
| UKD | Narayan Singh | 1,511 | 2.76 | ▼3.35 |
| RLD | Rajesh Joshi | 922 | 1.68 | New |
| SP | Manoj Kumar Bhatt | 778 | 1.42 | New |
| Independent | Mohan Chandra Tripathi | 724 | 1.32 | New |
| Vishwa Vikas Sangh | Hayat Singh Bisht | 507 | 0.93 | New |
| Independent | Manohar Chand | 366 | 0.67 | New |
| Margin of victory | | 7,058 | 12.90 | ▲11.88 |
| Turnout | | 54,727 | 64.89 | ▲10.04 |
| Registered electors | | 84,449 | | ▲18.91 |
| BJP gain from INC | | Swing | ▲20.35 | |

=== Assembly Election 2002 ===
2002 Uttaranchal Legislative Assembly election: Champawat
| Party | Candidate | Votes | % | ±% |
|---|---|---|---|---|
| INC | Hemesh Kharkwal | 8,380 | 21.55 | New |
| Independent | Madan Singh Mahrana | 7,985 | 20.53 | New |
| BJP | Hayat Singh Mahra | 7,743 | 19.91 | New |
| Independent | Bimla Sajwan | 6,343 | 16.31 | New |
| BSP | Tahir Husen | 2,501 | 6.43 | New |
| UKD | Narayan Singh | 2,375 | 6.11 | New |
| Independent | Manohar Chand | 1,017 | 2.61 | New |
| Independent | Devidutt | 460 | 1.18 | New |
| Uttarakhand Janwadi Party | Keshar Singh Bisht | 437 | 1.12 | New |
| Independent | Vinod Chandra Joshi | 414 | 1.06 | New |
| Independent | K. M. Dipti Rajwar | 392 | 1.01 | New |
| Independent | Girish Chandra | 353 | 0.91 | New |
| Independent | Bodh Singh | 320 | 0.82 | New |
| Independent | Dayanand | 173 | 0.44 | New |
| Margin of victory | | 395 | 1.02 | |
| Turnout | | 38,893 | 54.76 | |
| Registered electors | | 71,020 | | |
| INC win (new seat) | | | | |

== See also ==
- List of constituencies of the Uttarakhand Legislative Assembly
- Champawat district
