= Khajan Dass =

Indian politician (born 1958)

Khajan Dass (born 16 June 1958) is an Indian politician from Uttarakhand. He is currently serving as a state minister of Social Welfare, Minority Welfare, Student Welfare and Language in Government of Uttarakhand under the Chief Minister Pushkar Singh Dhami. He is an MLA from Rajpur Road Assembly constituency, which is reserved for Scheduled Caste community, in Dehradun district. He won as an MLA in the 2022 Uttarakhand Legislative Assembly election representing the Bharatiya Janata Party.

== Early life and education ==
Dass is from Dehradun, Uttarakhand. He is the son of Santa Dass. He passed Class 8 and later dropped out from school.

== Career ==
Dass won from Rajpur Road Assembly constituency representing Bharatiya Janata Party in the 2022 Uttarakhand Legislative Assembly election. He polled 37,027 votes and defeated his nearest rival, Rajkumar of Indian National Congress, by a margin of 11,163 votes. Earlier, he won the 2017 Uttarakhand Legislative Assembly election, defeating Rajkumar of Indian National Congress, by a margin of votes.8,632 votes. He won in 2007 from Dhanaulti Assembly constituency as a member of the BJP.

== Controversy ==
In April 2026, Khajan Dass was criticised for making preparations for his son's pre-wedding ceremony inside the core area of Rajaji Tiger Reserve. The preparations at the Sureshwari Devi Temple, were made inside the reserve forest area, which has restricted access to the public. The Uttarakhand Forest Department denied giving any permission to organize any such event, and lodged a case against two officials of the Temple Committee. Later, the wedding was moved out of the Rajaji park venue.
