= Ganesh Godiyal =

Indian politician

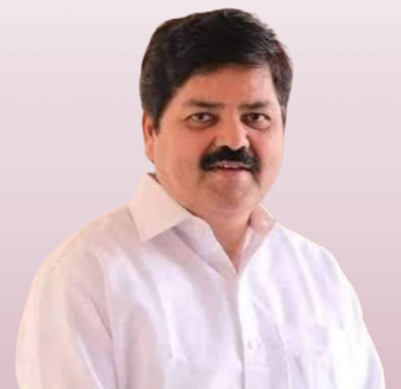

President Uttarakhand Pradesh Congress Committee
- Incumbent
- Assumed office 11 November 2025
- Preceded by: Karan Mahara
- In office 22 July 2021 – 10 April 2022
- Preceded by: Pritam Singh
- Succeeded by: Karan Mahara

Member of the Uttarakhand Legislative Assembly
- In office 2012–2017
- Preceded by: Brijmohan Kotwal, BJP
- Succeeded by: Dr. Dhan Singh Rawat, BJP
- Constituency: Srinagar
- In office 2002–2007
- Succeeded by: Dr. Ramesh Pokhriyal Nishank, BJP
- Constituency: Thalisain

Personal details
- Party: Indian National Congress

Ganesh Godiyal is an Indian National Congress politician from Uttarakhand, India. He was an MLA from Thalisain Assembly constituency and Srinagar Assembly constituency. He serves as the president of Uttarakhand Pradesh Congress Committee.

== Political career ==
He was appointed Uttarakhand Pradesh Congress Committee president on 22 July 2021 and served there till 10 April 2022. He was re-appointed to the post on 11 November 2025.

== Positions held ==
Year	Description
2002 - 2007	Elected to 1st Uttarakhand Assembly: Member - Committee on PSE and Corporate (2004–07); Member - Committee on Assembly Rules (2004–07)
2012 - 2017	Elected to 3rd Uttarakhand Assembly: Parliamentary Secretary

== Electoral Performances ==
Year	Election	Party	Constituency Name	Result	Votes gained	Vote share%	Margin	Ref
2002	1st Uttarakhand Assembly	INC	Thalisain	Won	14,764	43.56%	997	
2007	2nd Uttarakhand Assembly	INC	Thalisain	Lost	17,779	42.62%	1,803	
2012	3rd Uttarakhand Assembly	INC	Srinagar	Won	27,993	51.27%	5,063	
2017	4th Uttarakhand Assembly	INC	Srinagar	Lost	22,118	37.21%	8,698	
2022	5th Uttarakhand Assembly	INC	Srinagar	Lost	29,031	44.65%	587	
2024	18th Lok Sabha	INC	Garhwal	Lost	2,68,656	36.43%	1,36,503	

Party political offices
Preceded by Pritam Singh	President; Uttarakhand Pradesh Congress Committee; 22 July 2021 – 10 April 2022	Succeeded by Karan Mahara
Preceded by Karan Mahara	President; Uttarakhand Pradesh Congress Committee; 11 November 2025 – present	Incumbent
