= Narayan Singh Rana =

Indian politician

Member of the Uttar Pradesh Legislative Council
- Constituency: Garhwal Division, Uttarakhand

Sports Minister of Uttarakhand
- In office 2000–2002

Personal details
- Party: Bharatiya Janata Party
- Occupation: Politician

Narayan Singh Rana is an Indian politician and member of the Bharatiya Janata Party. Rana was a member of the Uttar Pradesh Legislative Council from the Garhwal Division in Uttarakhand. He is father and first coach of an Indian shooter Jaspal Rana. He was first sports minister of the Uttarakhand from 2000 to 2002. He also served Indo-Tibetan Border Police in 1967 and served in Jammu and Kashmir during the 1971 war and was also selected in the Special Protection Group in 1985. He also trains young shooter at Jaspal Rana Shooting Academy.

In 2017, Rana contested the 2017 Uttarakhand Legislative Assembly election from Dhanaulti Assembly constituency after being sidelined for 14 years, but lost to an independent candidate Pritam Singh Panwar.

== Personal life ==
Rana is the father of two sons, Subhash Rana and Jaspal Rana, and a daughter Sushma Singh. His elder son Jaspal was a shooting champion who was honoured with the Arjuna Award (1994) and Padma Shri (1997). Rana's only daughter, Sushma, is the daughter-in-law of Rajnath Singh, an eminent BJP leader who is presently defence Minister of India and holds the third place in the union cabinet, next only to the home Minister.
