= Bharat Singh Rawat =

Indian politician

Bharat Singh Rawat was an Indian politician and member of the Bharatiya Janata Party. Rawat was a member of the Uttarakhand Legislative Assembly from the Lansdowne constituency in Pauri Garhwal district.
