= Haridwar Rural Assembly constituency =

Constituency of the Uttarakhand legislative assembly in India

Coordinates: 29.88°N 78.13°E

Haridwar Rural
- Constituency No. 35 for the Uttarakhand Legislative Assembly

Constituency details
- Country: India
- Region: North India
- State: Uttarakhand
- District: Haridwar
- Lok Sabha constituency: Haridwar
- Total electors: 131,028
- Reservation: None

Member of Legislative Assembly
- 5th Uttarakhand Legislative Assembly
- Incumbent Anupama Rawat
- Party: Indian National Congress
- Elected year: 2022

Haridwar Rural Legislative Assembly constituency is one of the seventy electoral Uttarakhand Legislative Assembly constituencies of Uttarakhand state in India.

Haridwar Rural Legislative Assembly constituency is a part of Haridwar (Lok Sabha constituency).

== Members of Legislative Assembly ==
Election	Name	Party
2012	Yatishwaranand	Bharatiya Janata Party
2017	Yatishwaranand	Bharatiya Janata Party
2022	Anupama Rawat	Indian National Congress

== Election results ==
=== 2027 Assembly election ===
2027 Uttarakhand Legislative Assembly election: Haridwar Rural
Party	Candidate	Votes	%	±%
INC				
BSP	Irshad Ansari			
NOTA	None of the above			
Majority				
Turnout				
gain from		Swing		

=== Assembly Election 2022 ===
2022 Uttarakhand Legislative Assembly election: Haridwar Rural
Party	Candidate	Votes	%	±%
INC	Anupama Rawat	50,028	46.59%	▲13.33
BJP	Yatishwaranand	45,556	42.42%	▼3.33
BSP	Muhammad Yunus	4,547	4.23%	▼14.47
AAP	Naresh Sharma	2,906	2.71%	New
ASP(KR)	Pankaj Kumar Saini	1,539	1.43%	New
NOTA	None of the above	778	0.72%	▲0.07
Margin of victory		4,472	4.16%	▼8.33
Turnout		1,07,381	81.95%	▲0.19
Registered electors		1,31,028		▲9.01
INC gain from BJP		Swing	▲0.84	

=== Assembly Election 2017 ===
2017 Uttarakhand Legislative Assembly election: Haridwar Rural
Party	Candidate	Votes	%	±%
BJP	Yatishwaranand	44,964	45.75%	▲13.36
INC	Harish Rawat	32,686	33.26%	▲5.86
BSP	Mukarram	18,383	18.71%	▼5.96
NOTA	None of the above	645	0.66%	New
UKD	Subash Chand	514	0.52%	▼0.07
Margin of victory		12,278	12.49%	▲7.50
Turnout		98,273	81.76%	▲1.61
Registered electors		1,20,195		▲24.04
BJP hold		Swing	▲13.36	

=== Assembly Election 2012 ===
2012 Uttarakhand Legislative Assembly election: Haridwar Rural
Party	Candidate	Votes	%	±%
BJP	Yatishwaranand	25,159	32.39%	New
INC	Irshad Ali	21,284	27.40%	New
BSP	Sheshraj Singh	19,158	24.67%	New
URM	Shrikant Verma	6,452	8.31%	New
Independent	Mahaveer Singh	1,721	2.22%	New
SP	Jitendra Kumar	467	0.60%	New
UKD	Ranveer Singh Rana	460	0.59%	New
NCP	Dharampal Sahgal	411	0.53%	New
Margin of victory		3,875	4.99%	
Turnout		77,672	80.16%	
Registered electors		96,902		
BJP win (new seat)				

== See also ==
- Laldhang (Uttarakhand Assembly constituency)
- List of constituencies of the Uttarakhand Legislative Assembly
- Haridwar district
