= Mukesh Singh Koli =

Indian politician

- मुकेश सिंह कोली

MLA for Pauri
- In office 2017–2022
- Succeeded by: Rajkumar Pori
- Constituency: Pauri Assembly constituency

State incharge of Bharatiya Janata Party minority front
- Incumbent
- Assumed office 2022

Personal details
- Born: Mukesh Singh Koli; 2 October 1976 (age 50) Prachiyali, Pauri, Pauri Garhwal district, Uttrakhand, India, Asia
- Citizenship: India
- Party: Bharatiya Janata Party
- Parent: Dalip Singh Koli (father)

Mukesh Singh Koli is an Indian politician, social worker and former Member of Legislative Assembly for Pauri Assembly constituency as a member of Bharatiya Janata Party. In 2017 Uttarakhand Legislative Assembly election, Koli defeated the Naval Kishor of Indian National Congress party by the margin of 7,030 votes. Mukesh Singh Koli is serving as State-Incharge of Bharatiya Janata Party Minority Front for Uttrakhand.

== Early life ==
Mukesh Singh Koli was born to the Dalip Singh Koli in Prachiyali village of Pauri Garhwal district of Uttrakhand.

== Electoral performance ==
Election	Constituency	Party	Result	Votes %	Opposition Candidate	Opposition Party	Opposition vote %	Ref
2017	Pauri	BJP	Won	53.95%	Naval Kishor	INC	39.62%	

== Political career ==
- 2017 - 2022, Member of Legislative Assembly for Pauri Assembly constituency.
- 2023 - Ongoing, State-Incharge of Bharatiya Janata Party Minority Front.
