= Bhimtal Assembly constituency =

Constituency of the Uttarakhand legislative assembly in India

Coordinates: 29.35°N 79.55°E

Bhimtal
- Constituency No. 57 for the Uttarakhand Legislative Assembly

Constituency details
- Country: India
- Region: North India
- State: Uttarakhand
- District: Nainital
- Lok Sabha constituency: Nainital–Udhamsingh Nagar
- Total electors: 100,634
- Reservation: None

Member of Legislative Assembly
- 5th Uttarakhand Legislative Assembly
- Incumbent Ram Singh Kaira
- Party: Bhartiya Janata Party
- Elected year: 2022

Bhimtal Legislative Assembly constituency is one of the 70 Legislative Assembly constituencies of Uttarakhand state in India.

It is part of Nainital district.

== Members of the Legislative Assembly ==
Election	Member	Party
2012	Dan Singh Bhandari	Bharatiya Janata Party
2017	Ram Singh Kaira	Independent politician
2022	Ram Singh Kaira	Bharatiya Janata Party

== Election results ==
=== 2027 Assembly election ===
2027 Uttarakhand Legislative Assembly election: Bhimtal
Party	Candidate	Votes	%	±%
INC				
BJP				
NOTA	None of the above			
Majority				
Turnout				
gain from		Swing		

=== Assembly Election 2022 ===
2022 Uttarakhand Legislative Assembly election: Bhimtal
Party	Candidate	Votes	%	±%
BJP	Ram Singh Kaira	25,632	38.69%	▲13.54
INC	Dan Singh Bhandari	15,788	23.83%	▼0.13
Independent	Lakhan Singh Negi	12,508	18.88%	New
Independent	Manoj Sah	5,272	7.96%	New
UKD	Harish Chandra Joshi	1,797	2.71%	New
Independent	Prakash Chandra	1,662	2.51%	New
BSP	Bhuwan Chandra Arya	975	1.47%	▼12.29
AAP	Sanjay Kumar Pandey	874	1.32%	New
NOTA	Nota	799	1.21%	▼0.36
SP	Vikram Singh	549	0.83%	New
Independent	Suresh Chander Arya	399	0.60%	New
Margin of victory		9,844	14.86%	▲9.24
Turnout		66,255	65.29%	▲1.81
Registered electors		1,01,482		▲4.96
BJP gain from Independent		Swing	▲7.93	

=== Assembly Election 2017 ===
2017 Uttarakhand Legislative Assembly election: Bhimtal
Party	Candidate	Votes	%	±%
Independent	Ram Singh Kaira	18,878	30.76%	New
BJP	Govind Singh Bisht	15,432	25.14%	▼12.64
INC	Dan Singh Bhandari	14,702	23.96%	▼1.45
BSP	Tara Datt Pandey	8,444	13.76%	▼12.70
NOTA	None of the Above	963	1.57%	New
Independent	Govind Singh Bisht	703	1.15%	New
Independent	Suhail Ahmad	614	1.00%	New
Lok Shahi Party (Secular)	Kamal Pathak	460	0.75%	New
Independent	Krishnanand Kandpal	402	0.66%	New
Independent	Aan Singh	357	0.58%	New
Margin of victory		3,446	5.61%	▼5.71
Turnout		61,373	63.48%	▼1.99
Registered electors		96,683		▲11.26
Independent gain from BJP		Swing	▼7.02	

=== Assembly Election 2012 ===
2012 Uttarakhand Legislative Assembly election: Bhimtal
Party	Candidate	Votes	%	±%
BJP	Dan Singh Bhandari	21,494	37.78%	New
BSP	Mohan Pal	15,051	26.46%	New
INC	Ram Singh Kaira	14,452	25.40%	New
Independent	Dr. Suresh Singh Negi	1,733	3.05%	New
Independent	Kailash Singh	920	1.62%	New
UKD	Puran Singh Mehra	829	1.46%	New
UKPP	Naveen Chandra Bahuguna	605	1.06%	New
Independent	Ganesh Chandra	485	0.85%	New
Independent	Nirmala Joshi	472	0.83%	New
Independent	Rajendra Kumar Pant	369	0.65%	New
Margin of victory		6,443	11.32%	
Turnout		56,892	65.47%	
Registered electors		86,901		
BJP win (new seat)				

== See also ==
- Mukteshwar (Uttarakhand Assembly constituency)
