= Dhanaulti Assembly constituency =

Constituency of the Uttarakhand legislative assembly in India

Coordinates: 30.40°N 78.23°E

Dhanaulti
- Constituency No. 14 for the Uttarakhand Legislative Assembly

Constituency details
- Country: India
- Region: North India
- State: Uttarakhand
- District: Tehri Garhwal
- Lok Sabha constituency: Tehri Garhwal
- Total electors: 86,036
- Reservation: None

Member of Legislative Assembly
- 5th Uttarakhand Legislative Assembly
- Incumbent Pritam Singh Panwar
- Party: Bharatiya Janata Party
- Elected year: 2022

Dhanaulti Legislative Assembly constituency is one of the 70 assembly constituencies of Uttarakhand a northern state of India. Dhanaulti is part of Tehri Garhwal Lok Sabha constituency.

== Members of the Legislative Assembly ==
Election	Member	Party
2002	Kaul Dass	Indian National Congress
2007	Khajan Dass	Bharatiya Janata Party
2012	Mahavir Singh Rangarh	Bharatiya Janata Party
2017	Pritam Singh Panwar	Independent politician
2022	Pritam Singh Panwar	Bharatiya Janata Party

== Election results ==
=== 2027 Assembly election ===
2027 Uttarakhand Legislative Assembly election: Dhanaulti
Party	Candidate	Votes	%	±%
INC				
BJP				
NOTA	None of the above			
Majority				
Turnout				
gain from		Swing		

=== Assembly Election 2022 ===
2022 Uttarakhand Legislative Assembly election: Dhanaulti
Party	Candidate	Votes	%	±%
BJP	Pritam Singh Panwar	22,827	40.22%	▲7.52
INC	Jot Singh Bisht	18,143	31.97%	▲7.35
Independent	Mahavir Singh Rangarh	12,644	22.28%	New
AAP	Amendra Bisht	1,735	3.06%	New
NOTA	Nota	641	1.13%	▼0.16
Independent	Gaurav Tiwari	391	0.69%	New
Margin of victory		4,684	8.25%	▲4.99
Turnout		56,754	65.48%	▲1.04
Registered electors		86,675		▲12.77
BJP gain from Independent		Swing	▲4.26	

=== Assembly Election 2017 ===
2017 Uttarakhand Legislative Assembly election: Dhanaulti
Party	Candidate	Votes	%	±%
Independent	Pritam Singh Panwar	17,811	35.96%	New
BJP	Narayan Singh Rana	16,196	32.70%	▲6.33
INC	Manmohan Singh	12,193	24.62%	▲0.76
UKD	Rakesh Semwal	789	1.59%	▲0.50
NOTA	None of the Above	640	1.29%	New
BSP	Dinesh	551	1.11%	▲0.20
Independent	Uttam Singh	534	1.08%	New
Independent	Chaman Nautiyal	463	0.93%	New
Indian Business Party	Prem Dutt	332	0.67%	New
Margin of victory		1,615	3.26%	▲0.76
Turnout		49,524	64.44%	▼3.86
Registered electors		76,858		▲14.58
Independent gain from BJP		Swing	▲9.59	

=== Assembly Election 2012 ===
2012 Uttarakhand Legislative Assembly election: Dhanaulti
Party	Candidate	Votes	%	±%
BJP	Mahavir Singh Rangarh	12,081	26.37%	▼23.24
INC	Manmohan Singh	10,933	23.86%	▼8.99
Independent	Jot Singh Bisht	10,261	22.40%	New
Independent	Rajesh	6,049	13.20%	New
URM	Somvari Lal Uniyal	2,127	4.64%	New
Independent	Gulab Singh	1,499	3.27%	New
Independent	Devendra Prasad	636	1.39%	New
Independent	Yeshveer Arya	515	1.12%	New
UKD	Chintamani	503	1.10%	▼6.93
BSP	Mohan Lal	417	0.91%	▼0.43
Independent	Chait Ram Alias Chaitu	315	0.69%	New
Margin of victory		1,148	2.51%	▼14.25
Turnout		45,814	68.30%	▲6.14
Registered electors		67,079		▲7.02
BJP hold		Swing	▼23.24	

=== Assembly Election 2007 ===
2007 Uttarakhand Legislative Assembly election: Dhanaulti
Party	Candidate	Votes	%	±%
BJP	Khajan Dass	19,328	49.61%	▲22.86
INC	Kaul Dass	12,800	32.85%	▲0.17
UKD	Pritam Bhartwan	3,129	8.03%	▼2.64
NCP	Jouhri Lal Suman	1,251	3.21%	New
Independent	Jagtam Dass	1,064	2.73%	New
SP	Chaitu Alias Chait Ram	869	2.23%	▼1.40
BSP	Rukmani	521	1.34%	▼0.97
Margin of victory		6,528	16.75%	▲10.83
Turnout		38,962	62.18%	▲11.28
Registered electors		62,681		▼1.80
BJP gain from INC		Swing	▲16.93	

=== Assembly Election 2002 ===
2002 Uttaranchal Legislative Assembly election: Dhanaulti
Party	Candidate	Votes	%	±%
INC	Kaul Dass	10,612	32.68%	New
BJP	Khajan Dass	8,687	26.75%	New
Independent	Gyan Chand	4,544	13.99%	New
UKD	Jouhri Lal Suman	3,465	10.67%	New
Uttarakhand Janwadi Party	Jai Prakash Uttarakhandi	2,329	7.17%	New
SP	Kishan Lal	1,178	3.63%	New
Independent	Banwari Lal	911	2.81%	New
BSP	Mohan Lal	748	2.30%	New
Margin of victory		1,925	5.93%	
Turnout		32,474	50.91%	
Registered electors		63,830		
INC win (new seat)				

== See also ==
- Tehri Garhwal (Lok Sabha constituency)
