= Rajesh Juwantha =

Indian politician (1975 or 1976 – 2025)

Member of the Uttarakhand Legislative Assembly
- In office 2007–2022
- Constituency: Purola

Personal details
- Died: 22 December 2025 Dehradun, Uttarakhand, India
- Party: Bharatiya Janata Party
- Other party: Indian National Congress
- Children: Vanya Juwantha and Aarav Juwantha
- Parent(s): Barfiya Lal Juwantha and Shanti Juwantha

Rajesh Juwantha (1975 or 1976 – 22 December 2025) was an Indian politician, agriculturalist, and member of the Bharatiya Janata Party. He was a member of the Uttarakhand Legislative Assembly from the Purola Assembly constituency in Uttarkashi district, serving from 2007 to 2022.

Juwantha was the eldest son of late Barfiya Lal Juwantha, He was the Minister of Hill Development in the Mulayam Singh Yadav government, and 3 time MLA. His mother, Shanti Juwantha, served 23 years as chairperson of the Vikasnagar municipality.

Juwantha died in Dehradun on 22 December 2025, at the age of 49, after being ill for several years. He was survived by his wife, a son and a daughter.
