= Ram Singh Kaira =

Indian politician

Ram Singh Kaira is an Indian politician who currently serves as the cabinet minister of urban development, watershed management and climate change in the Government of Uttarakhand. He represents the Bhimtal Assembly constituency of Uttarakhand as a member of the Bhartiya Janata Party. He is a two term legislator from that seat.

== Electoral performance ==
Election	Constituency	Party	Result	Votes %	Opposition Candidate	Opposition Party	Opposition vote %
2022	Bhimtal	BJP	Won	38.69%	Dan Singh Bhandari	INC	23.83%
2017	Bhimtal	Independent	Won	30.76%	Govind Singh Bisht	BJP	25.14%
2012	Bhimtal	INC	Lost	25.40%	Dan Singh Bhandari	BJP	37.78%
