= Pauri Assembly constituency =

Legislative Assembly constituency in Uttarakhand State, India

Coordinates: 30.14°N 78.78°E

Pauri
- Constituency No. 37 for the Uttarakhand Legislative Assembly

Constituency details
- Country: India
- Region: North India
- State: Uttarakhand
- District: Pauri Garhwal
- Lok Sabha constituency: Garhwal
- Total electors: 93,158
- Reservation: SC

Member of Legislative Assembly
- 5th Uttarakhand Legislative Assembly
- Incumbent Rajkumar Pori
- Party: Bharatiya Janata Party
- Elected year: 2022

Pauri is one of the 70 constituencies in the Uttarakhand Legislative Assembly of Uttarakhand state of India. Pauri is also part of Garhwal Lok Sabha constituency.

== Members of the Legislative Assembly ==
Election	Member	Party
1969	Shiva Nand Nautiyal	Independent politician
1974	Bhagwati Charan	Indian National Congress
1977	Bhagwati Charan Nirmohi	Janata Party
1980	Narendra Singh Bhandari	Independent politician
1985	Pushkar Singh	Indian National Congress
1989	Narendra Singh Bhandari	Janata Dal
1991	Harak Singh Rawat	Bharatiya Janata Party
1993	Harak Singh Rawat	Bharatiya Janata Party
1996	Mohan Singh Rawat	Bharatiya Janata Party
Formation of Uttarakhand State; Major boundary changes
2002	Narendra Singh Bhandari	Indian National Congress
2007	Yashpal Benam	Independent politician
Major boundary changes
2012	Sundar Lal Mandrawal	Indian National Congress
2017	Mukesh Singh Koli	Bharatiya Janata Party
2022	Rajkumar Pori	Bharatiya Janata Party

== Election results ==
=== 2027 Assembly election ===
2027 Uttarakhand Legislative Assembly election: Pauri
Party	Candidate	Votes	%	±%
INC				
BJP				
NOTA	None of the above			
Majority				
Turnout				
gain from		Swing		

=== Assembly Election 2022 ===
2022 Uttarakhand Legislative Assembly election: Pauri
Party	Candidate	Votes	%	±%
BJP	Rajkumar Pori	25,865	52.60%	▼1.35
INC	Naval Kishor	20,127	40.93%	▲1.31
AAP	Manohar Lal	736	1.50%	New
NOTA	None of the above	675	1.37%	▼0.04
SP	Rajendra Prasad	458	0.93%	New
BSP	Ramesh Chandar	423	0.86%	▲0.12
UKD	Poonam Singh	358	0.73%	▲0.07
Uttarakhand Janekta Party	Onkar Singh	343	0.70%	New
Margin of victory		5,738	11.67%	▼2.66
Turnout		49,174	51.44%	▼0.82
Registered electors		95,590		▲1.83
BJP hold		Swing	▼1.35	

=== Assembly Election 2017 ===
2017 Uttarakhand Legislative Assembly election: Pauri
Party	Candidate	Votes	%	±%
BJP	Mukesh Singh Koli	26,469	53.95%	▲17.76
INC	Naval Kishor	19,439	39.62%	▼2.95
NOTA	None of the above	693	1.41%	New
Independent	Hari Kumar	593	1.21%	New
BSP	Ramesh Chander	364	0.74%	▼1.68
UKD	Vir Pratap Singh	323	0.66%	New
Independent	Devaki Nandan Shah	282	0.57%	New
Margin of victory		7,030	14.33%	▲7.95
Turnout		49,062	52.26%	▼1.21
Registered electors		93,874		▲10.20
BJP gain from INC		Swing	▲11.38	

=== Assembly Election 2012 ===
2012 Uttarakhand Legislative Assembly election: Pauri
Party	Candidate	Votes	%	±%
INC	Sundar Lal Mandrawal	19,389	42.57%	▲18.37
BJP	Ghananand	16,483	36.19%	▲4.86
URM	Manohar Lal	6,685	14.68%	New
BSP	Bhagwan Singh Tamta	1,102	2.42%	▼0.12
Independent	Rajesh Singh Raja	816	1.79%	New
Independent	Ganesh Lal	486	1.07%	New
Independent	Manoj Kumar	322	0.71%	New
Margin of victory		2,906	6.38%	▲6.35
Turnout		45,549	53.47%	▼2.82
Registered electors		85,182		
INC gain from Independent		Swing	▲11.20	

=== Assembly Election 2007 ===
2007 Uttarakhand Legislative Assembly election: Pauri
Party	Candidate	Votes	%	±%
Independent	Yashpal Benam	10,936	31.36%	New
BJP	Tirath Singh Rawat	10,925	31.33%	▲0.28
INC	Narendra Singh Bhandari	8,439	24.20%	▼16.77
UKD	Sudarsan Singh Negi	1,982	5.68%	▲4.68
BSP	Jagpal Singh	886	2.54%	▲1.40
BJSH	Mahabir Singh Negi	582	1.67%	New
Independent	Bachan Singh	524	1.50%	New
Independent	Prem Lal	304	0.87%	New
SP	Yuvraj Singh	291	0.83%	New
Margin of victory		11	0.03%	▼9.89
Turnout		34,869	56.55%	▲8.72
Registered electors		61,939		
Independent gain from INC		Swing	▼9.61	

=== Assembly Election 2002 ===
2002 Uttaranchal Legislative Assembly election: Pauri
Party	Candidate	Votes	%	±%
INC	Narendra Singh Bhandari	11,996	40.97%	New
BJP	Tirath Singh Rawat	9,091	31.05%	New
Independent	Sudarshan Singh Negi	3,563	12.17%	New
Independent	Ganesh Khugshal Gani	1,182	4.04%	New
Independent	Harish Chandra	954	3.26%	New
Independent	Sahadev Singh	448	1.53%	New
NCP	Vijay Laxmi	413	1.41%	New
BSP	Rajkumar Istwal Advocate	335	1.14%	New
Independent	P. C. Thapliyal	297	1.01%	New
UKD	Sajjan Singh Negi	293	1.00%	New
Uttarakhand Janwadi Party	Kamal Singh Aswal Alias Kamaleswar Singh Aswal	248	0.85%	New
Margin of victory		2,905	9.92%	
Turnout		29,281	47.98%	
Registered electors		61,541		
INC win (new seat)				

== See also ==
- Pauri
- Pauri Garhwal district
- List of constituencies of Uttarakhand Legislative Assembly
