= Mahavir Singh Rangarh =

Indian politician

Mahavir Singh Rangarh is an Indian politician and member of the Bharatiya Janata Party. Rangarh is a former member of the Uttarakhand Legislative Assembly from the Dhanaulti constituency in Tehri Garhwal district.
