= Anupama Rawat =

Indian politician

Member of the Uttarakhand Legislative Assembly
- Incumbent
- Assumed office 10 March 2022
- Preceded by: Yatishwaranand
- Constituency: Haridwar Rural

Personal details
- Party: Indian National Congress
- Parent: Harish Rawat (father)
- Profession: Politician

Anupama Rawat (born 09th September 1983) is an Indian politician from Uttarakhand. She won as an MLA from Haridwar Rural Assembly constituency. She won the 2022 Uttarakhand Legislative Assembly election representing the Indian National Congress. She is general secretary of Mahila Congress.

== Early life and education ==
Rawat is from Mussoorie, Dehradun District, Uttarakhand. She is the daughter of former chief minister Harish Rawat. She married Abhinandan Kumar. She completed her Master of Law at Krukshetra University in 2015.

== Career ==
Rawat became a first time MLA winning from Haridwar Rural Assembly constituency representing Indian National Congress in the 2022 Uttarakhand Legislative Assembly election. She polled 50,028 votes and defeated her nearest rival and two time saint turned politician, Yatishwaranand of Bharatiya Janata Party, by a margin of 4,472 votes.

== Electoral performance ==
Election	Constituency	Party	Result	Votes %	Opposition Candidate	Opposition Party	Opposition vote %	Ref
2022	Haridwar Rural	INC	Won	46.59%	Yatishwaranand	BJP	42.42%	
