= Sanjay Dobhal =

Indian politician

Member of the Uttarakhand Legislative Assembly
- Incumbent
- Assumed office 2022
- Preceded by: Kedar Singh Rawat (BJP)
- Constituency: Yamunotri

Personal details
- Party: Independent

Sanjay Dobhal is an Indian politician from Uttarakhand. He is a member of the Uttarakhand Legislative Assembly from Yamunotri Assembly constituency in Uttarkashi district.

Dobhal was elected as an MLA winning the 2022 Uttarakhand Legislative Assembly election as an independent politician. He defeated Deepak Bijalwan of Indian National Congress by 6639 votes.

== Electoral performance ==
Election	Constituency	Party	Result	Votes %	Opposition Candidate	Opposition Party	Opposition vote %	Ref
2022	Yamunotri	Independent	Won	44.01%	Deepak Bijalwan	INC	31.28%	
2017	Yamunotri	INC	Lost	29.27%	Kedar Singh	BJP	41.88%	
