= Shaila Rani Rawat =

Indian politician (1956–2024)

Member of the Uttarakhand Legislative Assembly
- In office 2022 – 9 July 2024
- Preceded by: Manoj Rawat
- Succeeded by: Asha Nautiyal
- Constituency: Kedarnath
- In office 2012–2017
- Preceded by: Asha Nautiyal
- Constituency: Kedarnath

Personal details
- Born: 7 January 1956 Gadoliya, Tehri Garhwal district, Uttar Pradesh, India
- Died: 9 July 2024 (aged 68) Dehradun, Uttarakhand, India
- Party: Bharatiya Janata Party
- Spouse: Gajendra Singh Rawat (m. 1974)
- Children: 1 daughter
- Parent: Late. Padam Singh Rana (father)
- Education: B. Ed.
- Occupation: Politician
- Profession: Teacher

Shaila Rani Rawat (7 January 1956 – 9 July 2024) was an Indian politician from Uttarakhand who was a member of Bharatiya Janata Party. She served as member of the Vidhan Sabha representing Kedarnath. She was elected from Kedarnath in 2012 state elections in Uttarakhand. She was a member of the Indian National Congress until she joined Bharatiya Janata Party in the aftermath of Uttarakhand political crisis.

Shaila Rani Rawat was elected as the member of Uttarakhand Legislative Assembly from Bhartiya Janata Party in 2022 Uttarakhand Legislative Assembly election and defeated Manoj Rawat of Indian National Congress by 9329 votes.

Shaila died from spinal injury complications in Dehradun, Uttarakhand, on 9 July 2024, at the age of 68.
