= Lansdowne Assembly constituency =

Legislative Assembly constituency in Uttarakhand State, India

Coordinates: 29.84°N 78.68°E

Lansdowne
- Constituency No. 40 for the Uttarakhand Legislative Assembly

Constituency details
- Country: India
- Region: North India
- State: Uttarakhand
- District: Pauri Garhwal
- Lok Sabha constituency: Garhwal
- Total electors: 83,460
- Reservation: None

Member of Legislative Assembly
- 5th Uttarakhand Legislative Assembly
- Incumbent Dilip Singh Rawat
- Party: Bharatiya Janata Party
- Elected year: 2022

Lansdowne Uttarakhand Legislative Assembly constituency is one of the 70 constituencies in the Uttarakhand Legislative Assembly of Uttarakhand state of India. Lansdowne is also part of Garhwal Lok Sabha constituency.

== Members of the Legislative Assembly ==
Election	Member	Party
1962	Mukandi Lal	Independent politician
1967	B.D. Dhuliya	Swatantra Party
1969	Chander Singh Negi	Indian National Congress
1974	Bharat Singh Rawat	Indian National Congress
1977	Bharat Singh Rawat	Janata Party
1980	Chander Singh Negi	Indian National Congress
1985	Surendra Singh Negi	Independent politician
1989	Bharat Singh Rawat	Indian National Congress
1991	Bharat Singh Rawat	Indian National Congress
1993	Surendra Singh Negi	Independent politician
1996	Bharat Singh Rawat	Bharatiya Janata Party
2002	Dr. Harak Singh Rawat	Indian National Congress
2007	Dr. Harak Singh Rawat	Indian National Congress
2012	Dilip Singh Rawat	Bharatiya Janata Party
2017	Dilip Singh Rawat	Bharatiya Janata Party
2022	Dilip Singh Rawat	Bharatiya Janata Party

== Election results ==
=== 2027 Assembly election ===
2027 Uttarakhand Legislative Assembly election: Lansdowne
Party	Candidate	Votes	%	±%
INC				
BJP				
NOTA	None of the above			
Majority				
Turnout				
gain from		Swing		

=== Assembly Election 2022 ===
2022 Uttarakhand Legislative Assembly election: Lansdowne
Party	Candidate	Votes	%	±%
BJP	Dilip Singh Rawat	24,504	59.18%	▲4.40
INC	Anukriti Gusain	14,636	35.35%	▼3.49
UKD	Anand Prakash	843	2.04%	▲0.93
NOTA	None of the above	447	1.08%	▼0.11
Independent	Mamta Devi	437	1.06%	New
AAP	Narendra Singh	304	0.73%	New
Margin of victory		9,868	23.83%	▲7.89
Turnout		41,407	47.38%	▼0.50
Registered electors		87,400		▲3.03
BJP hold		Swing	▲4.40	

=== Assembly Election 2017 ===
2017 Uttarakhand Legislative Assembly election: Lansdowne
Party	Candidate	Votes	%	±%
BJP	Dilip Singh Rawat	22,246	54.78%	▲16.48
INC	Tejpal Singh Rawat	15,771	38.83%	▲16.72
NOTA	None of the above	485	1.19%	New
UKD	Vikram Singh Rawat	450	1.11%	▼0.58
Independent	Ved Prakash Arya	434	1.07%	New
Independent	Jagmohan Singh Bisht	226	0.56%	New
Margin of victory		6,475	15.94%	▲2.35
Turnout		40,613	47.87%	▼4.47
Registered electors		84,832		▲10.97
BJP hold		Swing	▲16.48	

=== Assembly Election 2012 ===
2012 Uttarakhand Legislative Assembly election: Lansdowne
Party	Candidate	Votes	%	±%
BJP	Dilip Singh Rawat	15,324	38.30%	▲8.75
URM	Tejpal Singh Rawat	9,886	24.71%	New
INC	Km Jyoti Rautela	8,849	22.12%	▼19.85
BSP	Shishupal Singh Rawat	2,733	6.83%	▲3.97
UKD	Anand Prakash	675	1.69%	▼0.97
Independent	Madhu Bisht	672	1.68%	New
Independent	Manoj Kumar Kuksal	632	1.58%	New
Independent	Deepak Singh Bisht	432	1.08%	New
Independent	Manish Sundriyal	396	0.99%	New
Margin of victory		5,438	13.59%	▲1.17
Turnout		40,012	52.34%	▼1.78
Registered electors		76,445		
BJP gain from INC		Swing	▼3.67	

=== Assembly Election 2007 ===
2007 Uttarakhand Legislative Assembly election: Lansdowne
Party	Candidate	Votes	%	±%
INC	Dr. Harak Singh Rawat	12,899	41.97%	▲7.52
BJP	Bharat Singh Rawat	9,081	29.55%	▼3.09
NCP	Surya Kant Dhasmana	5,335	17.36%	New
BSP	Sudhir Dhyani	878	2.86%	▲1.38
UKD	Sunder Singh Chauhan	818	2.66%	▲0.60
Independent	Mangal Singh Negi	607	1.97%	New
SP	Heeramani	532	1.73%	▲0.40
Independent	Om Prakash	301	0.98%	New
SAP	Narendra Dhasmana	165	0.54%	New
Margin of victory		3,818	12.42%	▲10.61
Turnout		30,736	54.32%	▲7.90
Registered electors		56,793		
INC hold		Swing	▲7.52	

=== Assembly Election 2002 ===
2002 Uttaranchal Legislative Assembly election: Lansdowne
Party	Candidate	Votes	%	±%
INC	Dr. Harak Singh Rawat	8,914	34.45%	New
BJP	Bharat Singh Rawat	8,446	32.64%	New
Independent	Deepak Bhandari	3,185	12.31%	New
Independent	Shobhana Rawat Kaudiya	715	2.76%	New
Independent	Lambodar Prasad	683	2.64%	New
Uttarakhand Janwadi Party	Budhi Ballabh	669	2.59%	New
Independent	Mahendra Singh	632	2.44%	New
UKD	Narendra Singh Rawat	534	2.06%	New
BSP	Rajeshwar Prasad	381	1.47%	New
SP	Anil Bhatt	344	1.33%	New
Independent	Pramod Singh	333	1.29%	New
Margin of victory		468	1.81%	
Turnout		25,878	46.45%	
Registered electors		55,994		
INC win (new seat)				

== See also ==
- Lansdowne
- Pauri Garhwal district
- List of constituencies of Uttarakhand Legislative Assembly
