= Thalisain Assembly constituency =

Former constituency of the Uttarakhand Assembly, in India

Coordinates: 30.02°N 79.05°E

Thalisain
- Former constituency for the Uttarakhand Legislative Assembly

Constituency details
- Country: India
- Region: North India
- State: Uttarakhand
- District: Pauri Garhwal
- Lok Sabha constituency: Garhwal
- Established: 2002
- Abolished: 2012

Thalisain Legislative Assembly constituency was one of the seventy electoral Uttarakhand Legislative Assembly constituencies of Uttarakhand state in India. It was abolished in 2012 following the delimitation.

Thalisain Legislative Assembly constituency was a part of Garhwal (Lok Sabha constituency).

== Members of Legislative Assembly ==
Election	Member	Party
2002	Ganesh Prasad Godiyal	Indian National Congress
2007	Ramesh Pokhriyal	Bharatiya Janata Party

== Election results ==
=== Assembly Election 2007 ===
2007 Uttarakhand Legislative Assembly election: Thalisain
Party	Candidate	Votes	%	±%
BJP	Dr. Ramesh Pokhriyal	19,582	46.95	▲6.33
INC	Ganesh Godiyal	17,779	42.63	▼0.93
UKD	Lalit Bisht	974	2.34	▲1.74
Independent	Ram Bhakti	960	2.30	New
Independent	Premlal	667	1.60	New
BSP	Chatarpal Singh	588	1.41	▼0.38
Independent	Bhagwati Prasad Mamgain	504	1.21	New
Independent	Kalam Singh Chaudhary	312	0.75	New
Independent	Dayal Singh Bhandari	236	0.57	New
Margin of victory		1,803	4.32	▲1.38
Turnout		41,707	67.07	▲9.85
Registered electors		62,470		▲4.90
BJP gain from INC		Swing	▲3.39	

=== Assembly Election 2002 ===
2002 Uttaranchal Legislative Assembly election: Thalisain
Party	Candidate	Votes	%	±%
INC	Ganesh Godiyal	14,764	43.56	New
BJP	Dr. Ramesh Pokhriyal	13,767	40.62	New
Independent	Dr. Shivanand Nautiyal	2,388	7.05	New
Independent	Gabar Singh	812	2.40	New
BSP	Dr. Trilok Singh	605	1.78	New
SP	Shiv Prasad Raturi Rathi	604	1.78	New
SAP	Lalit Bisht	318	0.94	New
Independent	Jayanti Devi	254	0.75	New
UKD	Ummed Singh Rawat ' Ganapati'	202	0.60	New
RLD	Satish Kumar	181	0.53	New
Margin of victory		997	2.94	
Turnout		33,895	57.10	
Registered electors		59,551		
INC win (new seat)				
