= Kailash Chandra Gahtori =

Indian businessman and politician (1968–2024)

Member of the Uttarakhand Legislative Assembly
- In office 2017 – 21 April 2022
- Preceded by: Hemesh Kharkwal
- Succeeded by: Pushkar Singh Dhami
- Constituency: Champawat

Personal details
- Born: 15 August 1968 Champawat district, Uttar Pradesh, India
- Died: 3 May 2024 (aged 55) Dehradun, Uttarakhand, India
- Party: Bharatiya Janata Party (from 2012); Independent (until 2012)

Kailash Chandra Gahtori (15 August 1968 – 3 May 2024) was an Indian businessman and politician who served in the Uttarakhand Legislative Assembly from 2017 until his resignation in 2022, representing the Champawat constituency as a member of the Bharatiya Janata Party.

== Biography ==
Kailash Chandra Gahtori was born on 15 August 1968 in the Champawat district of Uttarakhand, which was then part of Uttar Pradesh. After graduating from university with an arts degree, Gahtori started a construction company in Madhya Pradesh. Gahtori returned to Uttarakhand in 2002, when he unsuccessfully ran as an independent candidate for the Uttarakhand Legislative Assembly in the 2002 election, running in the Lohaghat constituency. After his defeat, Gahtori returned to managing his business, and he came to own a hotel and two schools in the city of Kashipur.

Gahtori was a longtime member of the Rashtriya Swayamsevak Sangh, a paramilitary organization affiliated with the Bharatiya Janata Party, and he officially joined the BJP in 2012. Later that year, Gahtori was elected to the Champawat district council. Gahtori again ran for the Uttarakhand Legislative Assembly in the 2017 election, running as the BJP candidate in the Champawat constituency; Gahtori defeated Indian National Congress incumbent Hemesh Kharkwal, receiving 36,601 votes compared to Kharkwal's 19,241.

Gahtori ran for re-election in the 2022 Uttarakhand Legislative Assembly election, facing Kharkwal in a rematch. Gahtori again defeated Kharkwal, but by a reduced margin, receiving 32,547 votes compared to Kharkwal's 27,243. However, Pushkar Singh Dhami, the chief minister of Uttarakhand, was defeated in his bid for re-election in the Khatima constituency. In order for Dhami to remain chief minister, Gahtori resigned from his seat on 21 April 2022, allowing Dhami to run for the Champawat constituency in a by-election. Gahtori stated that it was his duty to resign, and that it would be an honour for Champawat to be represented by a chief minister. Dhami won 31 May by-election in a landslide, receiving over 92% of the vote; his 58,258 votes was the highest number of votes received in a by-election in Uttarakhand's history. After Dhami's victory, The Times of India reported that Gahtori was being considered for a ministerial position. On 16 June 2022, Gahtori was appointed chairman of the Uttarakhand Forest Development Corporation, which gave him the rank of minister.

Gahtori died from a prolonged illness at the Government Doon Medical College hospital in Dehradun, on 3 May 2024. He was 55.
