= Umesh Sharma =

Indian politician

Member of the Uttarakhand Legislative Assembly
- Incumbent
- Assumed office 2012
- Constituency: Raipur

Personal details
- Party: Bharatiya Janata Party

Umesh Sharma Kau is an Indian politician and member of the Bharatiya Janata Party. Sharma is a member of the Uttarakhand Legislative Assembly from the Raipur constituency in Dehradun district.

In the 2012 Uttarakhand Assembly elections, Umesh Sharma Kau, then with the Indian National Congress, defeated Trivendra Singh Rawat by a narrow margin of 0.62% votes.

In 2016, Umesh Sharma Kau along with other Congress MLAs rebelled and switched over to BJP.

He was re-elected in 2017 and 2022 as a Bharatiya Janata Party candidate with huge margin of 37.29% and 27.49% respectively.

== Controversies ==
In February 2026, police registered a case against BJP MLA Umesh Sharma Kau and several of his supporters for allegedly assaulting the Director of Elementary Education, Ajay Kumar Naudiyal, at the Uttarakhand Directorate of Elementary Education in Dehradun during a dispute over the renaming of a school.

== Electoral performance ==
Election	Constituency	Party	Result	Votes %	Opposition Candidate	Opposition Party	Opposition vote %	Ref
2022	Raipur	BJP	Won	60.15%	Hira Singh Bisht	INC	32.66%	
2017	Raipur	BJP	Won	60.60%	Prabhu Lal	INC	23.31%	
2012	Raipur	INC	Won	39.03%	Trivendra Singh Rawat	BJP	38.41%	
