= Raipur, Uttarakhand Assembly constituency =

Constituency of the Uttarakhand legislative assembly in India

Coordinates: 29.95°N 77.79°E

Raipur
- Constituency No. 19 for the Uttarakhand Legislative Assembly

Constituency details
- Country: India
- Region: North India
- State: Uttarakhand
- District: Dehradun
- Lok Sabha constituency: Tehri Garhwal
- Total electors: 177,176 (2022)
- Reservation: None

Member of Legislative Assembly
- 5th Uttarakhand Legislative Assembly
- Incumbent Umesh Sharma
- Party: Bhartiya Janta Party
- Elected year: 2022

Raipur Legislative Assembly constituency is one of the seventy electoral Uttarakhand Legislative Assembly constituencies of Uttarakhand state in India. It includes Raipur area.

Raipur Legislative Assembly constituency is a part of Tehri Garhwal Lok Sabha constituency. The constituency also covers 20 wards of the Dehradun Municipal Corporation.

== Members of the Legislative Assembly ==
Election	Member	Party
2012	Umesh Sharma	Indian National Congress
2017	Umesh Sharma	Bharatiya Janata Party
2022	Umesh Sharma	Bharatiya Janata Party

== Election results ==
=== 2027 Assembly election ===
2027 Uttarakhand Legislative Assembly election: Raipur
Party	Candidate	Votes	%	±%
INC				
BJP				
NOTA	None of the above			
Majority				
Turnout				
gain from		Swing		

=== Assembly Election 2022 ===
2022 Uttarakhand Legislative Assembly election: Raipur
Party	Candidate	Votes	%	±%
BJP	Umesh Sharma	65,756	60.15%	▼0.45
INC	Hira Singh Bisht	35,704	32.66%	▲9.35
AAP	Navin Pirshali	3,992	3.65%	New
UKD	Anil Dobhal	994	0.91%	New
NOTA	None of the above	956	0.87%	▲0.32
BSP	Sarmista Praliyan	893	0.82%	▼0.89
Margin of victory		30,052	27.49%	▼9.79
Turnout		1,09,316	61.36%	▲1.59
Registered electors		1,78,153		▲7.98
BJP hold		Swing	▼0.45	

=== Assembly Election 2017 ===
2017 Uttarakhand Legislative Assembly election: Raipur
Party	Candidate	Votes	%	±%
BJP	Umesh Sharma	59,764	60.60%	▲22.19
INC	Prabhu Lal	22,993	23.31%	▼15.71
Independent	Rajni Rawat	7,569	7.67%	New
Independent	Mahender Singh Negi	2,714	2.75%	New
BSP	Hari Singh Khorwal	1,680	1.70%	▼5.01
Independent	Tejendra Singh Rawat	1,079	1.09%	New
NOTA	None of the above	548	0.56%	New
Margin of victory		36,771	37.29%	▲36.67
Turnout		98,620	59.77%	▼4.07
Registered electors		1,64,986		▲37.48
BJP gain from INC		Swing	▲21.57	

=== Assembly Election 2012 ===
2012 Uttarakhand Legislative Assembly election: Raipur
Party	Candidate	Votes	%	±%
INC	Umesh Sharma	29,900	39.03%	New
BJP	Trivendra Singh Rawat	29,426	38.41%	New
BSP	Ajay Sood	5,142	6.71%	New
SP	Vinod Bharthwal	4,128	5.39%	New
Independent	Rajani Rawat	3,144	4.10%	New
Independent	Pankaj Chetri	705	0.92%	New
Independent	Mohan Singh Rawat	639	0.83%	New
URM	Rajendra Prasad Bhattkoti	536	0.70%	New
NCP	Roop Chand	441	0.58%	New
Independent	Manoj Kumar	409	0.53%	New
Margin of victory		474	0.62%	
Turnout		76,613	63.84%	
Registered electors		1,20,008		
INC win (new seat)				

== See also ==
- Raipur, Uttarakhand
