= Rudrapur Assembly constituency =

Rudrapur Assembly constituency may refer to

- Rudrapur, Uttarakhand Assembly constituency
- Rudrapur, Uttar Pradesh Assembly constituency
