= Sundar Lal Mandrawal =

Indian politician (died 2020)

Sundar Lal Mandrawal (died 30 September 2020) was an Indian politician and member of the Indian National Congress. He was a member of the Uttarakhand Legislative Assembly from the Pauri constituency and Srinagar in Pauri Garhwal district.
