= Srinagar Assembly constituency =

Legislative Assembly constituency in Uttarakhand State, India

Coordinates: 30.22°N 78.79°E

Srinagar
- Constituency No. 38 for the Uttarakhand Legislative Assembly

Constituency details
- Country: India
- Region: North India
- State: Uttarakhand
- District: Pauri Garhwal
- Lok Sabha constituency: Garhwal
- Total electors: 107,347
- Reservation: None

Member of Legislative Assembly
- 5th Uttarakhand Legislative Assembly
- Incumbent Dhan Singh Rawat
- Party: Bharatiya Janata Party
- Elected year: 2022

Srinagar Uttarakhand Legislative Assembly constituency is one of the 70 constituencies in the Uttarakhand Legislative Assembly of Uttarakhand state of India. Srinagar is also part of Garhwal Lok Sabha constituency.

== Members of the Legislative Assembly ==
Election	Member	Party
2002	Sundar Lal Mandrawal	Indian National Congress
2007	Brijmohan Kotwal	Bharatiya Janata Party
Major boundary changes
2012	Ganesh Godiyal	Indian National Congress
2017	Dr. Dhan Singh Rawat	Bharatiya Janata Party
2022	Dr. Dhan Singh Rawat	Bharatiya Janata Party

== Election results ==
=== 2027 Assembly election ===
2027 Uttarakhand Legislative Assembly election: Srinagar
Party	Candidate	Votes	%	±%
INC				
BJP				
NOTA	None of the above			
Majority				
Turnout				
gain from		Swing		

=== Assembly Election 2022 ===
2022 Uttarakhand Legislative Assembly election: Srinagar
Party	Candidate	Votes	%	±%
BJP	Dhan Singh Rawat	29,618	45.55%	▼5.26
INC	Ganesh Godiyal	29,031	44.65%	▲8.18
UKD	Mohan Kala	4,271	6.57%	▲5.72
AAP	Gajender Singh Chauhan	700	1.08%	New
NOTA	None of the above	643	0.99%	▼0.16
SUCI(C)	Sandeep Kumar	463	0.71%	New
Margin of victory		587	0.90%	▼13.44
Turnout		65,024	59.40%	▲1.79
Registered electors		1,09,467		▲3.97
BJP hold		Swing	▼5.26	

=== Assembly Election 2017 ===
2017 Uttarakhand Legislative Assembly election: Srinagar
Party	Candidate	Votes	%	±%
BJP	Dhan Singh Rawat	30,816	50.80%	▲9.06
INC	Ganesh Godiyal	22,118	36.46%	▼14.50
Independent	Mohan Prasad Kala	4,854	8.00%	New
NOTA	None of the above	697	1.15%	New
Independent	Naveen Prakash Nautiyal	608	1.00%	New
BSP	Ganesh Prasad	532	0.88%	New
UKD	Dhirendra Singh Bisht	516	0.85%	▼0.37
Margin of victory		8,698	14.34%	▲5.12
Turnout		60,656	57.61%	▼1.57
Registered electors		1,05,290		▲13.43
BJP gain from INC		Swing	▼0.16	

=== Assembly Election 2012 ===
2012 Uttarakhand Legislative Assembly election: Srinagar
Party	Candidate	Votes	%	±%
INC	Ganesh Godiyal	27,993	50.96%	▲18.19
BJP	Dhan Singh Rawat	22,930	41.75%	▼0.96
Independent	Shiv Singh	833	1.52%	New
Independent	Devendra Singh	695	1.27%	New
UKD	Arvind	672	1.22%	▼17.09
Independent	Sarvender Singh Panwar (Saheb)	631	1.15%	New
NCP	Bikram Singh	577	1.05%	New
Margin of victory		5,063	9.22%	▼0.72
Turnout		54,927	59.17%	▲5.78
Registered electors		92,823		
INC gain from BJP		Swing	▲8.25	

=== Assembly Election 2007 ===
2007 Uttarakhand Legislative Assembly election: Srinagar
Party	Candidate	Votes	%	±%
BJP	Brijmohan Kotwal	13,551	42.71%	▲8.81
INC	Sundar Lal Mandrawal	10,399	32.78%	▼7.73
UKD	Sohanlal Muyal	5,809	18.31%	▲13.55
Independent	Rakesh Lal	710	2.24%	New
BSP	Bholadutt Manderwal	392	1.24%	▼0.00
SP	Mahendra Kumar	328	1.03%	▼0.85
BJSH	Ranjana Devi	296	0.93%	New
Vishwa Vikas Sangh	Mohanlal	242	0.76%	New
Margin of victory		3,152	9.93%	▲3.33
Turnout		31,727	53.55%	▲10.96
Registered electors		59,416		
BJP gain from INC		Swing	▲2.21	

=== Assembly Election 2002 ===
2002 Uttaranchal Legislative Assembly election: Srinagar
Party	Candidate	Votes	%	±%
INC	Sundar Lal Mandrawal	10,040	40.51%	New
BJP	Brijmohan Kotwal	8,403	33.90%	New
Independent	Sohanlal Muyal	2,747	11.08%	New
UKD	Chaman Lal Pradyot	1,179	4.76%	New
Independent	Rajkumar	844	3.41%	New
SP	Mahendra Kumar	468	1.89%	New
Independent	Ganpat Lal	373	1.50%	New
BSP	Bhakti Lal Tamta	307	1.24%	New
CPI(ML)L	Harishpati	182	0.73%	New
RLD	Rajendra Singh Gothwal	130	0.52%	New
Margin of victory		1,637	6.60%	
Turnout		24,787	42.56%	
Registered electors		58,403		
INC win (new seat)				

== See also ==
- Pauri Garhwal district
- List of constituencies of Uttarakhand Legislative Assembly
