= Purola Assembly constituency =

Constituency of the Uttarakhand legislative assembly in India

Coordinates: 30.88°N 78.08°E

Purola
- Constituency No. 1 for the Uttarakhand Legislative Assembly

Constituency details
- Country: India
- Region: North India
- State: Uttarakhand
- District: Uttarkashi
- Lok Sabha constituency: Tehri Garhwal
- Total electors: 73,788
- Reservation: SC

Member of Legislative Assembly
- 5th Uttarakhand Legislative Assembly
- Incumbent Durgeshwar Lal
- Party: Bharatiya Janata Party
- Elected year: 2022

Purola is one of the 70 assembly constituencies of Uttarakhand a northern state of India. It is a part of Tehri Garhwal Lok Sabha constituency.

== Members of the Legislative Assembly ==
Election	Member	Party
2002	Mal Chand	Bharatiya Janata Party
2007	Rajesh Juwantha	Indian National Congress
2012	Mal Chand	Bharatiya Janata Party
2017	Rajkumar	Indian National Congress
2022	Durgeshwar Lal	Bharatiya Janata Party

== Election results ==
=== 2027 Assembly election ===
2027 Uttarakhand Legislative Assembly election: Purola
Party	Candidate	Votes	%	±%
INC				
BJP				
NOTA	None of the above			
Majority				
Turnout				
gain from		Swing		

=== Assembly Election 2022 ===
2022 Uttarakhand Legislative Assembly election: Purola
Party	Candidate	Votes	%	±%
BJP	Durgeshwar Lal	27,856	53.95%	▲20.06
INC	Mal Chand	21,560	41.76%	▲5.82
AAP	Prakash	538	1.04%	New
Rashtriya Lokneeti Party	Ram Prasad	495	0.96%	New
SP	Chain Singh	464	0.90%	New
BSP	Ujali Devi	389	0.75%	▼0.62
NOTA	None of the above	330	0.64%	▼0.90
Margin of victory		6,296	12.19%	▲10.15
Turnout		51,632	69.26%	▼4.13
Registered electors		74,551		▲10.45

=== Assembly Election 2017 ===
2017 Uttarakhand Legislative Assembly election: Purola
Party	Candidate	Votes	%	±%
INC	Rajkumar	17,798	35.93%	▲12.21
BJP	Mal Chand	16,785	33.89%	▼5.86
Independent	Durgeshwar Lal	13,508	27.27%	New
NOTA	None of the above	762	1.54%	New
BSP	Ramlal	679	1.37%	▼2.27
Margin of victory		1,013	2.05%	▼6.37
Turnout		49,532	73.39%	▼4.27
Registered electors		67,496		▲15.10

=== Assembly Election 2012 ===
2012 Uttarakhand Legislative Assembly election: Purola
Party	Candidate	Votes	%	±%
BJP	Mal Chand	18,098	39.74%	▲22.85
Independent	Rajkumar	14,266	31.33%	New
INC	Rajesh Juwantha	10,804	23.73%	▼13.46
BSP	Kishan Lal	1,659	3.64%	▲1.20
UPP	Prakash Devnata	706	1.55%	New
Margin of victory		3,832	8.42%	▲7.15
Turnout		45,536	77.65%	▲3.90
Registered electors		58,640		
BJP gain from INC		Swing	▲2.56	

=== Assembly Election 2007 ===
2007 Uttarakhand Legislative Assembly election: Purola
Party	Candidate	Votes	%	±%
INC	Rajesh Juwantha	15,467	37.18%	▲5.57
Independent	Mal Chand	14,942	35.92%	New
BJP	Amrit Singh	7,027	16.89%	▼23.90
UKD	Gulbiya Singh	1,179	2.83%	▲1.85
NCP	Ramlal	1,119	2.69%	New
BSP	Surya Prakash	1,016	2.44%	▼0.03
Independent	Madan Mohan Arya	848	2.04%	New
Margin of victory		525	1.26%	▼7.91
Turnout		41,598	73.76%	▲10.43
Registered electors		56,403		
INC gain from BJP		Swing	▼3.61	

=== Assembly Election 2002 ===
2002 Uttaranchal Legislative Assembly election: Purola
Party	Candidate	Votes	%	±%
BJP	Mal Chand	13,209	40.79%	New
INC	Shanti Devi Alias Shanti Juwantha	10,238	31.62%	New
Uttarakhand Janwadi Party	Shailendra Lal	4,610	14.24%	New
Independent	Sakal Chand	1,668	5.15%	New
SP	Virendra Lal	1,097	3.39%	New
BSP	Hirpal Arya	800	2.47%	New
Independent	Gulbiya	443	1.37%	New
UKD	Jethu Lal	318	0.98%	New
Margin of victory		2,971	9.17%	
Turnout		32,383	63.34%	
Registered electors		51,144		
BJP win (new seat)				

== See also ==
- Uttarkashi (Uttarakhand Assembly constituency)
