= Yamunotri Assembly constituency =

Constituency of the Uttarakhand legislative assembly in India

Coordinates: 31.00°N 78.46°E

Yamunotri
- Constituency No. 2 for the Uttarakhand Legislative Assembly

Constituency details
- Country: India
- Region: North India
- State: Uttarakhand
- District: Uttarkashi
- Lok Sabha constituency: Tehri Garhwal
- Total electors: 75,821
- Reservation: None

Member of Legislative Assembly
- 5th Uttarakhand Legislative Assembly
- Incumbent Sanjay Dobhal
- Party: Independent
- Elected year: 2022

Yamunotri Assembly constituency is one of the 70 assembly constituencies of Uttarakhand a northern state of India. Yamunotri is part of Tehri Garhwal Lok Sabha constituency.

== Members of the Legislative Assembly ==
Election	Member	Party
2002	Pritam Singh Panwar	Uttarakhand Kranti Dal
2007	Kedar Singh Rawat	Indian National Congress
2012	Pritam Singh Panwar	Uttarakhand Kranti Dal
2017	Kedar Singh Rawat	Bharatiya Janata Party
2022	Sanjay Dobhal	Independent politician

== Election results ==
=== 2027 Assembly election ===
2027 Uttarakhand Legislative Assembly election: Yamunotri
Party	Candidate	Votes	%	±%
INC				
BJP				
NOTA	None of the above			
Majority				
Turnout				
gain from		Swing		

=== Assembly Election 2022 ===
2022 Uttarakhand Legislative Assembly election: Yamunotri
Party	Candidate	Votes	%	±%
Independent	Sanjay Dobhal	22,952	44.01%	▲14.83
INC	Deepak Bijalwan	16,313	31.28%	New
BJP	Kedar Singh Rawat	10,620	20.36%	▼21.52
AAP	Manoj Kohli Shyam	583	1.12%	New
NOTA	None of the above	565	1.08%	▲0.19
BSP	Jagaveer Singh	343	0.66%	▼0.46
Rashtriya Uttarakhand Party	Vishal Singh	295	0.57%	New
UKD	Ramesh Chand Ramola	264	0.51%	▼0.01
Margin of victory		6,639	12.73%	▲0.12
Turnout		52,153	67.75%	▲0.59
Registered electors		76,982		▲9.36
Independent gain from BJP		Swing	▲2.13	

=== Assembly Election 2017 ===
2017 Uttarakhand Legislative Assembly election: Yamunotri
Party	Candidate	Votes	%	±%
BJP	Kedar Singh Rawat	19,800	41.88%	▲14.70
INC	Sanjay Dobhal	13,840	29.27%	New
Independent	Prakash Chand Ramola	7,061	14.94%	New
Independent	Ranveer Singh	4,613	9.76%	New
BSP	Rajbahadur Singh Bauddh	530	1.12%	▼0.85
NOTA	None of the above	424	0.90%	New
Sarv Vikas Party	Jaiprakash	342	0.72%	New
Independent	Dharmanand Bijalwan	248	0.52%	New
UKD	Purushottam Uniyal	246	0.52%	▼35.63
Margin of victory		5,960	12.61%	▲6.71
Turnout		47,276	67.16%	▼3.97
Registered electors		70,393		▲13.79
BJP gain from UKD		Swing	▲5.73	

=== Assembly Election 2012 ===
2012 Uttarakhand Legislative Assembly election: Yamunotri
Party	Candidate	Votes	%	±%
UKD	Pritam Singh Panwar	15,909	36.15%	▲11.99
INC	Kedar Singh Rawat	13,313	30.25%	▼1.12
BJP	Jagveer Singh	11,961	27.18%	▲13.57
Independent	Mahaveer Singh	1,058	2.40%	New
BSP	Vijendra Prasad	867	1.97%	▼10.12
JD(U)	Jeet Singh Bhadkoti	454	1.03%	New
URM	Murari Lal	374	0.85%	New
Margin of victory		2,596	5.90%	▼1.31
Turnout		44,004	71.13%	▲0.96
Registered electors		61,863		
UKD gain from INC		Swing	▲4.78	

=== Assembly Election 2007 ===
2007 Uttarakhand Legislative Assembly election: Yamunotri
Party	Candidate	Votes	%	±%
INC	Kedar Singh Rawat	14,484	31.37%	▲11.90
UKD	Pritam Singh Panwar	11,156	24.16%	▼2.21
BJP	Vimla Devi	6,283	13.61%	▼1.90
BSP	Darshan Lal	5,581	12.09%	▲0.98
Independent	Ranveer Singh	3,711	8.04%	New
Independent	Sakal Chand	2,518	5.45%	New
NCP	Dhonkar Singh	678	1.47%	▼3.16
BJSH	Parshuram Jaguri	640	1.39%	New
SAP	Sabbal Singh	599	1.30%	New
Independent	Ram Prasad	518	1.12%	New
Margin of victory		3,328	7.21%	▲0.31
Turnout		46,168	70.17%	▲6.32
Registered electors		65,797		
INC gain from UKD		Swing	▲5.00	

=== Assembly Election 2002 ===
2002 Uttaranchal Legislative Assembly election: Yamunotri
Party	Candidate	Votes	%	±%
UKD	Pritam Singh Panwar	9,498	26.37%	New
INC	Kedar Singh Rawat	7,013	19.47%	New
BJP	Sulochana	5,584	15.51%	New
BSP	Buddhi Singh`	3,999	11.10%	New
Uttarakhand Janwadi Party	Balbeer Singh Bist	1,909	5.30%	New
NCP	Manveer Singh	1,667	4.63%	New
Independent	Ranveer Singh	1,304	3.62%	New
CPI	Bishan Singh	1,269	3.52%	New
Independent	Sangat Singh Chauhan	1,041	2.89%	New
Independent	Dhaunkar Singh	922	2.56%	New
Independent	Bimal Dev Awasthi	756	2.10%	New
Margin of victory		2,485	6.90%	
Turnout		36,013	63.87%	
Registered electors		56,408		
UKD win (new seat)				

== See also ==
- Uttarkashi (Uttarakhand Assembly constituency)
