= Yatishwaranand =

Indian politician

Personal details
- Born: 2 November 1973 (age 52) Kaimla, Karnal district, Haryana, India
- Party: Bharatiya Janata Party

Yatishwaranand (born 2 November 1973) is an Indian politician and member of the Bharatiya Janata Party. Yatishwaranand was a member of the Uttarakhand Legislative Assembly from the Haridwar Rural constituency in Haridwar district. He was Minister of State (independent charge) in Teerath Singh Rawat led state government from March 12, 2021 till 2022.

== Electoral performance ==
Election	Constituency	Party	Result	Votes %	Opposition Candidate	Opposition Party	Opposition vote %	Ref
2022	Haridwar Rural	BJP	Lost	42.42%	Anupama Rawat	INC	46.59%	
2017	Haridwar Rural	BJP	Won	45.75%	Harish Rawat	INC	33.26%	
2012	Haridwar Rural	BJP	Won	32.39%	Irshad Ali	INC	27.40%	
