= Adesh Singh Chauhan =

Indian politician

Member of the Legislative Assembly Jaspur
- Incumbent
- Assumed office 18 May 2017
- Constituency: Jaspur

Personal details
- Born: Jaspur, Uttarakhand, India
- Party: Indian National Congress
- Other political affiliations: Bharatiya Janata Party
- Occupation: Politician

Adesh Singh Chauhan is an Indian politician and a member of the Uttarakhand Legislative Assembly from Jaspur (Uttarakhand Assembly constituency) from the Indian National Congress. He won the 2017 Uttarakhand Legislative Assembly election from the Indian National Congress and formerly served as party member for the Bharatiya Janata Party. He was re-elected in 2022.

== Electoral performance ==
2022 Uttarakhand Legislative Assembly election: Jaspur
Party	Candidate	Votes	%	±%
INC	Adesh Singh Chauhan	42,886	43.81%	▼2.51
BJP	Dr. Shailendra Mohan Singhal	38,714	39.55%	▼2.19
AAP	Mohd Yoonus Chaudhari	9,454	9.66%	New
BSP	Ajay Agarwal	5,061	5.17%	▼4.26
NOTA	None of the above	476	0.49%	▼0.21
Margin of victory		4,172	4.26%	▼0.31
Turnout		97,893	73.53%	▼5.83
Registered electors		1,33,136		▲15.01
INC hold		Swing	▼2.51	

2017 Uttarakhand Legislative Assembly election: Jaspur
Party	Candidate	Votes	%	±%
INC	Adesh Singh Chauhan	42,551	46.32%	▲12.98
BJP	Dr. Shailendra Mohan Singhal	38,347	41.74%	▲13.53
BSP	Mohammad Umar	8,666	9.43%	▼20.28
NOTA	None of the above	644	0.70%	New
Independent	Km. Seema Chauhan	578	0.63%	New
Margin of victory		4,204	4.58%	▲0.95
Turnout		91,869	79.36%	▲1.88
Registered electors		1,15,764		▲17.12
INC hold		Swing	▲12.98	

2012 Uttarakhand Legislative Assembly election: Jaspur
Party	Candidate	Votes	%	±%
INC	Dr. Shailendra Mohan Singhal	25,533	33.34%	▼0.89
BSP	Mohammad Umar	22,753	29.71%	▲20.88
BJP	Adesh Singh Chauhan	21,604	28.21%	▲16.23
SP	Sultan Bharti	4,021	5.25%	▼6.84
Independent	Shahnawaz	615	0.80%	New
Independent	Chandrapal Singh	576	0.75%	New
Margin of victory		2,780	3.63%	▼12.34
Turnout		76,584	77.48%	▲3.03
Registered electors		98,839		
INC hold		Swing	▼0.89	
