= Rajkumar Pori =

Indian politician (born 1971)

Member of the Uttarakhand Legislative Assembly
- Incumbent
- Assumed office 2022
- Preceded by: Mukesh Singh Koli

Personal details
- Party: Bhartiya Janata Party

Rajkumar Pori (born 1971) is an Indian politician. He is a member of the Uttarakhand Legislative Assembly as a member of the Bharatiya Janata Party, representing Pauri Assembly constituency

== Electoral performance ==
Election	Constituency	Party	Result	Votes %	Opposition Candidate	Opposition Party	Opposition vote %	Ref
2022	Pauri	BJP	Won	52.60%	Naval Kishor	INC	40.93%	
