= Asha Nautiyal =

Indian politician

Member of the Uttarakhand Legislative Assembly
- Incumbent
- Assumed office 2024
- Preceded by: Shaila Rani Rawat
- Constituency: Kedarnath
- In office 2002–2012
- Succeeded by: Shaila Rani Rawat

Personal details
- Born: 25 June 1969 (age 57) Ukhimath, Rudraprayag district, Uttarakhand
- Party: Bharatiya Janata Party

Asha Nautiyal (born 25 June 1969) is an Indian politician from Uttarakhand. She is a member of the Bharatiya Janata Party (BJP) and the incumbent Member of the Uttarakhand Legislative Assembly from Kedarnath.

== Early life ==
Asha Nautiyal was born on 25 June 1969 in Ukhimath, Rudraprayag district, Uttarakhand. She continues to reside in Ukhimath.

== Political career ==
Nautiyal began her political career with the Bharatiya Janata Party and was first elected to the Uttarakhand Legislative Assembly in 2002 from Kedarnath constituency. She was re-elected in 2007, but lost the seat in 2012 to Shaila Rani Rawat.

In the November 2024 by-election, Nautiyal contested again from Kedarnath and won, defeating Congress candidate Manoj Rawat by a margin of 5,622 votes. She secured 23,814 votes according to the Election Commission of India.
