= Kedar Singh Rawat =

Indian politician

MLA Kedar Singh Rawat

Member of Legislative Assembly for Yamunotri
- In office 2017–2022
- Preceded by: Pritam Singh Panwar
- Succeeded by: Sanjay Dobhal
- In office 2007–2012
- Preceded by: Pritam Singh Panwar
- Succeeded by: Pritam Singh Panwar

Personal details
- Party: Bharatiya Janata Party
- Other political affiliations: Congress party

Kedar Singh Rawat is an Indian politician from Uttarakhand and a member of the Bharatiya Janata Party. He is a two time MLA from Yamunotri Assembly constituency in Uttarkashi district. He won as the Indian National Congress candidate in the 2007 and as a Bharatiya Janata Party candidate in 2017.

== Career ==
Rawat has been active in political life since college days when he was elected the general secretary from DAV college Dehradun. He has been a successful lawyer before quitting practice and contesting elections since 2002 when Uttarakhand became a separate state and first elections were held.

== Electoral performance ==
Election	Constituency	Party	Result	Votes %	Opposition Candidate	Opposition Party	Opposition vote %	Ref
2022	Yamunotri	BJP	Lost	20.36%	Sanjay Dobhal	Independent	44.01%	
2017	Yamunotri	BJP	Won	41.88%	Sanjay Dobhal	INC	29.27%	
2012	Yamunotri	INC	Lost	30.25%	Pritam Singh Panwar	UKD	36.15%	
2007	Yamunotri	INC	Won	31.37%	Pritam Singh Panwar	UKD	24.16%	
2002	Yamunotri	INC	Lost	19.47%	Pritam Singh Panwar	UKD	26.37%	
