= Dan Singh Bhandari =

Indian politician

Dan Singh Bhandari is an Indian politician and member of the Bharatiya Janata Party. Dan Singh Bhandari was a member of the Uttarakhand Legislative Assembly from the Bhimtal constituency in Nainital district.
