= Sahaspur Assembly constituency =

Constituency of the Uttarakhand legislative assembly in India

Coordinates: 30.39°N 77.81°E

Sahaspur
- Constituency No. 17 for the Uttarakhand Legislative Assembly

Constituency details
- Country: India
- Region: North India
- State: Uttarakhand
- District: Dehradun
- Lok Sabha constituency: Tehri Garhwal
- Total electors: 171,762
- Reservation: None

Member of Legislative Assembly
- 5th Uttarakhand Legislative Assembly
- Incumbent Sahdev Singh Pundir
- Party: Bharatiya Janata Party
- Elected year: 2022

Sahaspur Legislative Assembly constituency is one of the seventy electoral Uttarakhand Legislative Assembly constituencies of Uttarakhand state in India. It includes Dehradun Cantonment area. This seat is a part of Tehri Garhwal (Lok Sabha constituency).The constituency also covers 10 wards of the Dehradun Municipal Corporation.

== Members of the Legislative Assembly ==
Election	Member	Party
2002	Sadhu Ram	Indian National Congress
2007	Rajkumar	Bharatiya Janata Party
2012	Sahdev Singh Pundir	Bharatiya Janata Party
2017	Sahdev Singh Pundir	Bharatiya Janata Party
2022	Sahdev Singh Pundir	Bharatiya Janata Party

== Election results ==
=== 2027 Assembly election ===
2027 Uttarakhand Legislative Assembly election: Sahaspur
Party	Candidate	Votes	%	±%
INC				
BJP				
NOTA	None of the above			
Majority				
Turnout				
gain from		Swing		

=== Assembly Election 2022 ===
2022 Uttarakhand Legislative Assembly election: Sahaspur
Party	Candidate	Votes	%	±%
BJP	Sahdev Singh Pundir	64,008	50.86%	▲10.45
INC	Aryendra Sharma	55,653	44.22%	▲21.11
AAP	Bharat Singh	2,235	1.78%	New
NOTA	None of the above	1,099	0.87%	▲0.26
CPI(M)	Kamrudeen	638	0.51%	New
Margin of victory		8,355	6.64%	▼10.67
Turnout		1,25,850	72.70%	▼0.26
Registered electors		1,73,115		▲15.86
BJP hold		Swing	▲10.45	

=== Assembly Election 2017 ===
2017 Uttarakhand Legislative Assembly election: Sahaspur
Party	Candidate	Votes	%	±%
BJP	Sahdev Singh Pundir	44,055	40.42%	▲9.18
INC	Kishore Upadhyaya	25,192	23.11%	▼1.55
Independent	Aryendra Sharma	21,888	20.08%	New
Independent	Laxmi Agarwal	8,628	7.92%	New
Independent	Gaurav Pundir	2,963	2.72%	New
Independent	Prakash Joshi	1,410	1.29%	New
CPI(M)	Shiv Prasad Devli	1,110	1.02%	▼2.66
BSP	Iltaf	831	0.76%	▼4.96
NOTA	None of the above	673	0.62%	New
Margin of victory		18,863	17.30%	▲10.72
Turnout		1,09,006	72.96%	▼1.61
Registered electors		1,49,413		▲33.52
BJP hold		Swing	▲9.18	

=== Assembly Election 2012 ===
2012 Uttarakhand Legislative Assembly election: Sahaspur
Party	Candidate	Votes	%	±%
BJP	Sahdev Singh Pundir	26,064	31.24%	▲0.09
INC	Aryendra Sharma	20,574	24.66%	▲0.65
Independent	Gulzar Ahmad	9,699	11.62%	New
Independent	Laxmi Agarwal	5,650	6.77%	New
Independent	Rakesh	5,181	6.21%	New
BSP	Sahab Singh Pundir	4,775	5.72%	▼8.63
CPI(M)	Shiv Prasad Devli	3,070	3.68%	▲0.45
URM	Prakash Joshi	1,509	1.81%	New
SP	Gulfam Ali	1,272	1.52%	▼4.20
Independent	Bhoop Singh	953	1.14%	New
Independent	Ram Bahadur Tamang	874	1.05%	New
Margin of victory		5,490	6.58%	▼0.56
Turnout		83,437	74.56%	▲13.72
Registered electors		1,11,900		
BJP hold		Swing	▲0.09	

=== Assembly Election 2007 ===
2007 Uttarakhand Legislative Assembly election: Sahaspur
Party	Candidate	Votes	%	±%
BJP	Rajkumar	21,390	31.15%	▲7.37
INC	Sadhu Ram	16,490	24.01%	▼11.66
BSP	Shispal Singh	9,855	14.35%	▲10.59
Independent	Charan Pal	5,947	8.66%	New
SP	Kalu Singh	3,931	5.72%	▼0.27
UKD	Sukhpal Koli	2,340	3.41%	New
CPI(M)	Sher Singh	2,216	3.23%	▼3.76
Independent	Jai Singh	1,128	1.64%	New
Independent	Jagat Ram	818	1.19%	New
NCP	Chaman Lal Pradyot	802	1.17%	New
Independent	Shambhu Prasad	771	1.12%	New
Margin of victory		4,900	7.14%	▼4.76
Turnout		68,673	60.86%	▲0.94
Registered electors		1,12,876		
BJP gain from INC		Swing	▼4.53	

=== Assembly Election 2002 ===
2002 Uttaranchal Legislative Assembly election: Sahaspur
Party	Candidate	Votes	%	±%
INC	Sadhu Ram	15,588	35.67%	New
BJP	Pradeep	10,392	23.78%	New
Uttarakhand Janwadi Party	Gulab Singh	5,605	12.83%	New
CPI(M)	Sher Singh	3,054	6.99%	New
SP	Daya Ram	2,619	5.99%	New
BSP	Payara Singh Bens	1,644	3.76%	New
Independent	Mohan Singh	663	1.52%	New
Independent	Radhey Shyam	649	1.49%	New
LJP	Amar Kumar	577	1.32%	New
RPD	Vijay Pal	477	1.09%	New
Independent	Kunwar Singh	404	0.92%	New
Margin of victory		5,196	11.89%	
Turnout		43,696	59.92%	
Registered electors		72,943		
INC win (new seat)				
