= Manoj Rawat =

Indian politician

Member of Legislative Assembly, Uttarakhand Vidhan Sabha
- In office 2017–2022
- Preceded by: Shaila Rani Rawat
- Succeeded by: Shaila Rani Rawat
- Constituency: Kedarnath

Personal details
- Party: Indian National Congress
- Parent: Late. Fakir Singh Rawat (father)
- Education: Post Graduate
- Profession: Journalism

Manoj Rawat is an Indian politician. He is a member of the Indian National Congress.

== Electoral performance ==
Year	Constituency	Result	Vote percentage	Opposition Candidate	Opposition Party	Opposition vote percentage	Ref
2017	Kedarnath	Won	25.06%	Kuldeep Singh Rawat	Independent	23.49%	
2022	Kedarnath	Lost	20.68%	Shaila Rani Rawat	BJP	36.04%	
2024	Kedarnath	Lost	33.42%	Asha Nautiyal	BJP	43.74%	
