= Kedarnath Assembly constituency =

Constituency of the Uttarakhand legislative assembly in India

Coordinates: 30.73°N 79.07°E

Kedarnath
- Constituency No. 7 for the Uttarakhand Legislative Assembly

Constituency details
- Country: India
- Region: North India
- State: Uttarakhand
- District: Rudraprayag
- Lok Sabha constituency: Garhwal
- Total electors: 88,829
- Reservation: None

Member of Legislative Assembly
- 5th Uttarakhand Legislative Assembly
- Incumbent Asha Nautiyal
- Party: BJP
- Elected year: 2024

Kedarnath Legislative Assembly constituency is one of the seventy electoral Uttarakhand Legislative Assembly constituencies of Uttarakhand state in India. It includes Ukhimath Tehsil & KC Chopta Jakhani of Rudraprayag Tehsil area.

Kedarnath Legislative Assembly constituency is a part of Garhwal (Lok Sabha constituency).

== Members of the Legislative Assembly ==
Election	Member	Party
1957	Narendra Singh	Indian National Congress
1962	Gangadhar	Praja Socialist Party
1967–2002 : Constituency abolished, see Badri-Kedar Assembly constituency
2002	Asha Nautiyal	Bharatiya Janata Party
2007	Asha Nautiyal	Bharatiya Janata Party
Major boundary changes
2012	Shaila Rani Rawat	Indian National Congress
2017	Manoj Rawat	Indian National Congress
2022	Shaila Rani Rawat	Bharatiya Janata Party
2024^	Asha Nautiyal	Bharatiya Janata Party

- ^ denotes by-election

== Election results ==
=== 2027 Assembly election ===
2027 Uttarakhand Legislative Assembly election: Kedarnath
Party	Candidate	Votes	%	±%
INC				
BJP				
NOTA	None of the above			
Majority				
Turnout				
gain from		Swing		

=== 2024 by-election ===
Uttarakhand Legislative Assembly by-election, 2024: Kedarnath
Party	Candidate	Votes	%	±%
BJP	Asha Nautiyal	23,814	43.74	▲7.7
INC	Manoj Rawat	18,192	33.42	▲12.74
Independent	Tribhuwan Chauhan	9,311	17.10	New
UKD	Ashutosh Bhandari	1,314	2.41	▲0.30
NOTA	None of the Above	834	1.53	▲0.29
Majority		5,622	10.32	▼3.62
Turnout		53,526	58.89	▼6.39
BJP hold		Swing		

=== Assembly Election 2022 ===
2022 Uttarakhand Legislative Assembly election: Kedarnath
Party	Candidate	Votes	%	±%
BJP	Shaila Rani Rawat	21,886	36.04	▲15.79
Independent	Kuldeep Singh Rawat	13,423	22.11	New
INC	Manoj Rawat	12,557	20.68	▼3.87
AAP	Sumant	4,647	7.65	New
Independent	Devesh Nautiyal	3,068	5.05	New
Independent	Kuldeep Singh Rawat	795	1.31	New
NOTA	None of the above	751	1.24	▼0.03
UKD	Gajpal Singh Rawat	746	1.23	▼3.60
Independent	Rekha Devi	697	1.15	New
CPI(M)	Rajaram	689	1.13	New
BSP	Shyam Lal Chandrawal	584	0.96	▲0.17
Margin of victory		8,463	13.94	▲12.40
Turnout		60,723	65.28	▼0.49
Registered electors		93,016		▲7.99
BJP gain from INC		Swing	▲11.50	

=== Assembly Election 2017 ===
2017 Uttarakhand Legislative Assembly election: Kedarnath
Party	Candidate	Votes	%	±%
INC	Manoj Rawat	13,906	24.55	▼15.92
Independent	Kuldeep Singh Rawat	13,037	23.01	New
Independent	Asha Nautiyal	11,786	20.80	New
BJP	Shaila Rani Rawat	11,472	20.25	▼15.49
UKD	Gangadhar	2,734	4.83	New
CPI(M)	Gangadhar Nautiyal	1,001	1.77	▼3.09
NOTA	None of the above	715	1.26	New
Independent	Shambhu Prasad	650	1.15	New
Sainik Samaj Party	Vikram Singh	456	0.80	New
BSP	Kundan Lal	447	0.79	▼3.10
Margin of victory		869	1.53	▼3.19
Turnout		56,653	65.77	▲0.43
Registered electors		86,135		▲14.10
INC hold		Swing	▼15.92	

=== Assembly Election 2012 ===
2012 Uttarakhand Legislative Assembly election: Kedarnath
Party	Candidate	Votes	%	±%
INC	Shaila Rani Rawat	19,960	40.46	▲13.25
BJP	Asha Nautiyal	17,632	35.74	▲2.74
CPI(M)	Gangadhar Nautiyal	2,395	4.86	▼1.52
BSP	Ramesh Prasad Chamola	1,918	3.89	▼1.66
Independent	Dinesh Chandra	1,859	3.77	New
URM	Durgpal Chauhan	1,501	3.04	New
CPI	Laxmi Jaggi	1,492	3.02	▼2.93
Independent	Om Prakash Vashisth	435	0.88	New
LJP	Shambhu Prasad	289	0.59	New
Margin of victory		2,328	4.72	▼1.07
Turnout		49,329	65.35	▲3.32
Registered electors		75,489		
INC gain from BJP		Swing	▲7.46	

=== Assembly Election 2007 ===
2007 Uttarakhand Legislative Assembly election: Kedarnath
Party	Candidate	Votes	%	±%
BJP	Asha Nautiyal	16,971	33.01	▲2.86
INC	Kunwar Singh Negi	13,992	27.21	▲5.06
Independent	Rajendra Singh	3,811	7.41	New
CPI(M)	Gangadhar Nautiyal	3,278	6.38	▲3.88
CPI	Ravindra Singh	3,062	5.95	▲1.79
BSP	Vinod Chandra	2,853	5.55	▼5.16
BJSH	Dinesh Chandra	2,627	5.11	New
Independent	Laxman Singh	2,301	4.47	New
NCP	Veer Singh Budera	1,101	2.14	▲0.18
Independent	Rajbeer Singh	525	1.02	New
Independent	Tulsi Ram Bhatt	379	0.74	New
Margin of victory		2,979	5.79	▼2.19
Turnout		51,419	62.66	▲7.97
Registered electors		82,894		
BJP hold		Swing	▲2.86	

=== Assembly Election 2002 ===
2002 Uttaranchal Legislative Assembly election: Kedarnath
Party	Candidate	Votes	%	±%
BJP	Asha Nautiyal	13,080	30.14	New
INC	Shaila Rani Rawat	9,615	22.16	New
BSP	Lakshman Singh	4,646	10.71	New
Independent	Pardeep Bagwari	2,995	6.90	New
UKD	Avtar Singh	2,905	6.69	New
Independent	Rajendra Singh	2,351	5.42	New
CPI	Jai Narayan	1,807	4.16	New
CPI(M)	Gangadhar Nautiyal	1,083	2.50	New
Uttarakhand Janwadi Party	Maya Ram	893	2.06	New
NCP	Partap Singh	851	1.96	New
Independent	Mohan Singh	670	1.54	New
Margin of victory		3,465	7.98	
Turnout		43,397	54.09	
Registered electors		80,270		
BJP win (new seat)				

== See also ==
- Badri–Kedar (Uttarakhand Assembly constituency)
