= Rajkumar (politician) =

Indian politician

Member of Uttarakhand Legislative Assembly
- In office 2017–2021
- Constituency: Purola

Member of Uttarakhand Legislative Assembly
- In office 2007–2012
- Constituency: Sahaspur

Personal details
- Party: Bharatiya Janata Party (2021–) (Before 2012)
- Other political affiliations: Indian National Congress (2017–2021)

Rajkumar is an Indian politician from Uttarakhand. He is a member of the Bharatiya Janata Party. He resigned from his seat in Purola Assembly constituency and joined Bharatiya Janata Party in September 2021.

== Career ==
Rajkumar won from Purola Assembly constituency representing the Indian National Congress in the 2017 Uttarakhand Legislative Assembly election defeating Mal Chand of the BJP by a margin of 1,013 votes. Earlier, he won form Sahaspur Assembly constituency following the 2007 Uttarakhand Legislative Assembly election as a member of the Bharatiya Janata Party. However he contested from Purola Assembly constituency in 2012 as an independent and lost to Mal Chand of the BJP.
