= Dhan Singh Rawat =

Indian politician

Dr. Dhan Singh Rawat
- Rawat in 2025

Minister of Higher Education, Govt of Uttarakhand
- Incumbent
- Assumed office 18 March 2017
- Chief Minister: Trivendra Singh Rawat; Tirath Singh Rawat; Pushkar Singh Dhami

Member of Uttarakhand Legislative Assembly
- Incumbent
- Assumed office 11 March 2017
- Preceded by: Ganesh Godiyal
- Constituency: Srinagar

Personal details
- Born: 7 October 1972 (age 54) Paithani, Uttarakhand, India
- Party: Bharatiya Janata Party
- Spouse: Deepa Rawat

Dr. Dhan Singh Rawat (born 7 October 1972) is a Cabinet Minister of Uttarakhand and a member of the Bharatiya Janata Party (BJP). He has served as a Member of the Legislative Assembly of Uttarakhand, representing the constituency of Srinagar Garhwal.

== Personal life and career ==
Dhan Singh Rawat was born in a hamlet in Pauri Garhwal and educated at the village school. He earned master's and doctoral degrees from Hemwati Nandan Bahuguna Garhwal University in History. A party secretary for the BJP in Uttarakhand, he failed to gain election to the state legislature in 2012 in the constituency of Srinagar Garhwal; he entered the legislature in 2017 and has since served as a Cabinet Minister with responsibility for health, higher education, cooperatives, disaster management, dairy development and protocols.

== Controversy ==
Dhan Singh Rawat has landed into controversy after he purportedly said in a viral video that the government was thinking of "using an app to control the intensity of rainfall". As an aftermath, a lot of statements came to light accusing Dhan Singh Rawat of forging his doctorate. The statement is believed to have been made at a recent media interaction which detailed steps taken by the government to tackle rain-related damage.

To which former chief minister and Congress veteran Harish Rawat took a jibe saying, “Uttarakhand chief minister Pushkar Dhami should propose his cabinet minister's name for Bharat Ratna.”
