= Shailendra Mohan Singhal =

Indian politician

Shailendra Mohan Singhal is a leader of Bharatiya Janata Party from Uttarakhand, India. He served as member of the Vidhan Sabha representing Jaspur. He was elected from Jaspur in 2002, 2007 and 2012 state elections in Uttarakhand. He was a member of the Indian National Congress until he joined Bharatiya Janata Party aftermath of Uttarakhand political crisis.

== Electoral performance ==
2022 Uttarakhand Legislative Assembly election: Jaspur
Party	Candidate	Votes	%	±%
INC	Adesh Singh Chauhan	42,886	43.81%	▼2.51
BJP	Dr. Shailendra Mohan Singhal	38,714	39.55%	▼2.19
AAP	Mohd Yoonus Chaudhari	9,454	9.66%	New
BSP	Ajay Agarwal	5,061	5.17%	▼4.26
NOTA	None of the above	476	0.49%	▼0.21
Margin of victory		4,172	4.26%	▼0.31
Turnout		97,893	73.53%	▼5.83
Registered electors		1,33,136		▲15.01
INC hold		Swing	▼2.51	

2017 Uttarakhand Legislative Assembly election: Jaspur
Party	Candidate	Votes	%	±%
INC	Adesh Singh Chauhan	42,551	46.32%	▲12.98
BJP	Dr. Shailendra Mohan Singhal	38,347	41.74%	▲13.53
BSP	Mohammad Umar	8,666	9.43%	▼20.28
NOTA	None of the above	644	0.70%	New
Independent	Km. Seema Chauhan	578	0.63%	New
Margin of victory		4,204	4.58%	▲0.95
Turnout		91,869	79.36%	▲1.88
Registered electors		1,15,764		▲17.12
INC hold		Swing	▲12.98	

2012 Uttarakhand Legislative Assembly election: Jaspur
Party	Candidate	Votes	%	±%
INC	Dr. Shailendra Mohan Singhal	25,533	33.34%	▼0.89
BSP	Mohammad Umar	22,753	29.71%	▲20.88
BJP	Adesh Singh Chauhan	21,604	28.21%	▲16.23
SP	Sultan Bharti	4,021	5.25%	▼6.84
Independent	Shahnawaz	615	0.80%	New
Independent	Chandrapal Singh	576	0.75%	New
Margin of victory		2,780	3.63%	▼12.34
Turnout		76,584	77.48%	▲3.03
Registered electors		98,839		
INC hold		Swing	▼0.89	

2007 Uttarakhand Legislative Assembly election: Jaspur
Party	Candidate	Votes	%	±%
INC	Dr. Shailendra Mohan Singhal	25,063	34.23%	▲10.63
Independent	Mohammad Umar	13,368	18.26%	New
SP	Abdul Hafeez	8,851	12.09%	▲1.67
BJP	Surendra Singh Chouhan	8,770	11.98%	▼2.06
BSP	Adesh Kumar Chouhan	6,463	8.83%	▲0.27
Independent	Shyam Singh Gehlot	4,002	5.47%	New
Independent	Vishvjeet Singh	1,396	1.91%	New
Independent	Usha Rani	1,351	1.85%	New
Independent	Mohd. Javed	714	0.98%	New
Independent	Geeta	482	0.66%	New
Margin of victory		11,695	15.97%	▲13.50
Turnout		73,223	74.48%	▲9.46
Registered electors		98,342		
INC gain from Independent		Swing	▲8.16	

2002 Uttarakhand Legislative Assembly election: Jaspur
Party	Candidate	Votes	%	±%
Independent	Dr. Shailendra Mohan Singhal	13,897	26.07%	New
INC	Adbul Hafij	12,580	23.60%	New
BJP	Rajiv Kumar	7,485	14.04%	New
SP	Manoj Joshi	5,556	10.42%	New
BSP	Aasad Ali	4,562	8.56%	New
Independent	Usha Rani	2,097	3.93%	New
LJP	Anandpal Singh	1,774	3.33%	New
Rashtriya Kisan Party	Puran Singh	1,357	2.55%	New
Independent	Rajesh Kumar	1,107	2.08%	New
SJP(R)	Dulla Khan	825	1.55%	New
CPI	Babu Singh	675	1.27%	New
Margin of victory		1,317	2.47%	
Turnout		53,315	65.00%	
Registered electors		82,024		
Independent win (new seat)				
