= Mal Chand =

Indian politician

Member of the Uttarakhand Legislative Assembly
- Constituency: Purola
- In office 2002–2007
- Succeeded by: Rajesh Juwantha

Personal details
- Party: Indian National Congress (pre-2024); Bharatiya Janata Party (post-2024)

Mal Chand is an Indian politician and a member of the Bhartiya Janata Party. Malchand was previously a member of the Uttarakhand Legislative Assembly from the Purola constituency in Uttarkashi district as a member of the Indian National Congress. In 17 March 2024, Mal Chand along with Miss Grand International India Anukriti Gusain and former Gangotri MLA Vijay Sajwan changed parties.

== Electoral performance ==
Election	Constituency	Party	Result	Votes %	Opposition Candidate	Opposition Party	Opposition vote %	Ref
2022	Purola	INC	Lost	41.76%	Durgeshwar Lal	BJP	53.95%	
2017	Purola	INC	Lost	33.89%	Rajesh Juwantha	BJP	35.93%	
2012	Purola	INC	Lost	31.74%	Rajesh Juwantha	BJP	39.33%	
2007	Purola	Independent	Lost	35.92%	Rajesh Juwantha	INC	37.18%	
2002	Purola	BJP	Won	40.79%	Shanti Devi Alias Shanti Juwantha	INC	31.62%	
