= Gopal Singh Rawat =

Indian civil servant (died 2020)

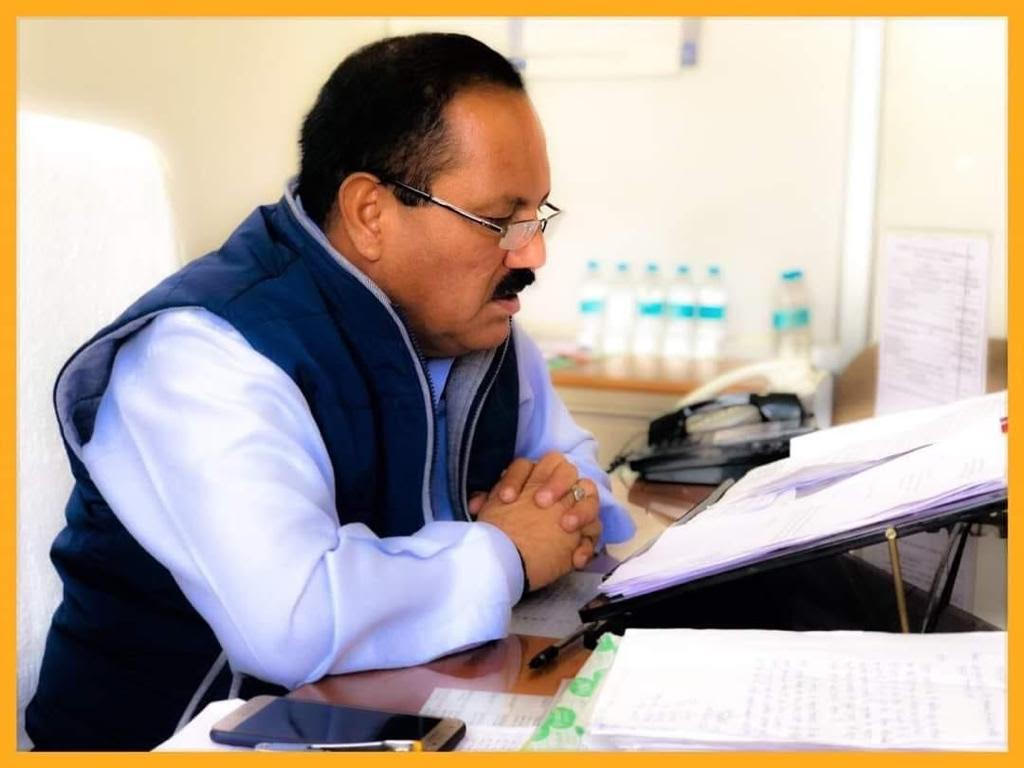

Personal details
- Died: 22 September 2020 Rishikesh, India
- Profession: Civil servant

Gopal Singh Rawat (died 22 September 2020) was an Officer on Special Duty to Uttarakhand Chief Minister Trivendra Singh Rawat.

He died on 22 September 2020, from COVID-19 during the COVID-19 pandemic in India at the hospital of All India Institute of Medical Sciences, Rishikesh. He had been hospitalized for nearly three weeks.
