= Brijmohan Kotwal =

Indian politician (died 2020)

Brijmohan Kotwal (died 21 May 2020) was an Indian politician and member of the Bharatiya Janata Party. Kotwal was a member of the Uttarakhand Legislative Assembly from the Srinagar constituency in Pauri Garhwal district.
