= Dilip Singh Rawat =

Indian politician

Member of the Uttarakhand Legislative Assembly
- Incumbent
- Assumed office 2012
- Preceded by: Harak Singh Rawat
- Constituency: Lansdowne

Personal details
- Party: Bharatiya Janata Party
- Occupation: Politician

Dilip Singh Rawat is an Indian politician and member of the Bharatiya Janata Party. Rawat is a member of the Uttarakhand Legislative Assembly from the Lansdowne constituency in Pauri Garhwal district.
