= Pritam Singh Panwar =

Indian politician

Member of the Uttarakhand Legislative Assembly
- Incumbent
- Assumed office 2017
- Preceded by: Mahaveer Singh
- Constituency: Dhanaulti
- In office 2012–2017
- Preceded by: Kedar Singh Rawat
- Succeeded by: Kedar Singh Rawat
- Constituency: Yamunotri
- In office 2002–2007
- Preceded by: Constituency established
- Succeeded by: Kedar Singh Rawat
- Constituency: Yamunotri

Personal details
- Born: 16 January 1966 (age 60) Village Than, Tehri Garhwal district, Uttarakhand
- Party: Bharatiya Janata Party
- Spouse: Shakuntala Panwar (m. 1989)
- Children: 2 sons and 2 daughters
- Parent: Late Manohar Lal (father)
- Occupation: Politician

Pritam Singh Panwar is an Indian politician and a Bhartiya Janata Party leader and member of the Uttarakhand Legislative Assembly in India. He was elected from Yamunotri constituency in the 2002 Uttarakhand Legislative Assembly election and 2012. In 2012 Uttarakhand Legislative Assembly election, he defeated Kedar Singh Rawat of Indian National Congress. Panwar has been 2 times MLA from UKD ticket and 1 time independent MLA whereas he won 1 time from BJP ticket.

== Electoral performance ==
Election	Constituency	Party	Result	Votes %	Opposition Candidate	Opposition Party	Opposition vote %	Ref
2022	Dhanaulti	BJP	Won	40.22%	Jot Singh Bisht	INC	31.97%	
2017	Dhanaulti	Independent	Won	35.96%	Narayan Singh Rana	BJP	32.70%	
2012	Yamunotri	UKD	Won	36.15%	Kedar Singh Rawat	INC	30.25%	
2007	Yamunotri	UKD	Lost	24.16%	Kedar Singh	INC	31.37%	
2002	Yamunotri	UKD	Won	26.37%	Kedar Singh	INC	19.47%	
