= Rajkumar Thukral =

Indian politician

Member of Uttarakhand Legislative Assembly
- In office 2012 – 2022
- Succeeded by: Shiv Arora
- Constituency: Rudrapur

Rajkumar Thukral is an Indian politician and a former member of the Bharatiya Janata Party and currently a member of the Indian National Congress. Thukral was a two term member of the Uttarakhand Legislative Assembly from the Rudrapur constituency in Udham Singh Nagar district as a member of the Bharatiya Janata Party.

He tendered his resignation to the top leadership of the Bharatiya Janata Party on 27 January 2022 after District President of Bharatiya Janata Party. Shiv Arora got ticket from Rudrapur Constituency for Assembly Elections 2022. Shiv Arora won 2022 Uttarakhand Legislative Assembly election by a margin of more than 19,800 votes.

Thukral joined the Indian National Congress in 2026, ahead of the 2027 Uttarakhand Legislative Assembly election.
