= Hemesh Kharkwal =

Indian politician

Hemesh Kharkwal is an Indian politician from Uttarakhand. He is a member of the Indian National Congress.

In 2012, he was elected from Champawat district's Champawat assembly constituency of Uttarakhand. He was also the MLA of Champawat from 2012 to 2017 and from 2002 to 2007. He unsuccessfully fought against then BJP MLA Kailash Gahtori in 2017 and 2022.
