= 2016 Uttarakhand political crisis =

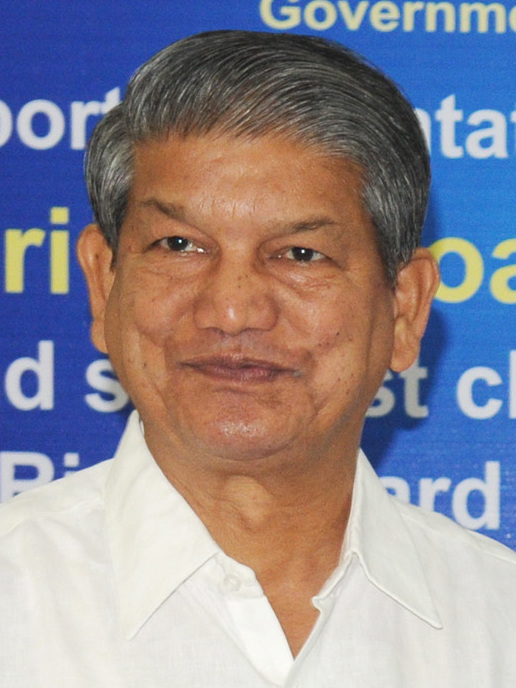
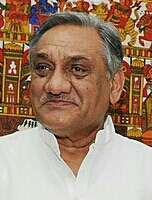
- Harish Rawat (left), Vijay Bahuguna (right)
- Date: 18 March 2016 – 10 May 2016
- Location: Uttarakhand, India
- Type: Parliamentary crisis and government formation
- Cause: Rebellion and defection of the Indian National Congress members of the Uttarakhand Legislative Assembly
- Participants: Indian National Congress (INC); Bharatiya Janata Party (BJP)
- Outcome: Brief period of President's rule followed by the reinstallation of Harish Rawat government

Starting March 2016, Indian state of Uttarakhand underwent a political crisis. The Indian National Congress Chief Minister Harish Rawat replaced Vijay Bahuguna as the Chief Minister of Uttarakhand on 2014. After a political crisis in 2016, the President's rule was imposed ending his tenure as the Chief Minister when 9 rebel Congress MLAs withdrew their support to the Harish Rawat government. On 13 July 2016, Uttarakhand High Court lifted the President's rule and reinstated the Harish Rawat government. Next day the Supreme Court of India stayed the High Court's order and the President's rule was imposed again that lasted till May. In May, Harish Rawat government was once again reinstalled and the rebel MLAs were suspended by the Speaker on the grounds of defection.

== Background ==
Following the 2012 Uttarakhand Legislative Assembly election in which neither Indian National Congress, nor Bharatiya Janata Party could get a majority, Congress being largest party in the fractured Uttarakhand Legislative Assembly picked Vijay Bahuguna to lead the government in the state with the support of Progressive Democratic Front, despite Harish Rawat being amongst the front-runners for the post of Chief Minister. Following the devastating Uttarakhand floods in 2013, Bahuguna was asked to resign and Rawat was made the Chief Minister of the state months before the 2014 Indian general election.

== Crisis ==
In March 2016, capping a nine-day high-voltage political drama, the Bharatiya Janata Party-led Union Government brought Uttarakhand under President's rule citing a constitutional breakdown in the wake of a rebellion in then state-ruling Indian National Congress, which slammed the decision calling it a "murder of democracy" and a "black day".

President Pranab Mukherjee signed the proclamation under Article 356 of the Constitution of India dismissing the INC-ruled State Government, the Chief Minister Harish Rawat and placing the Assembly under suspended animation on the recommendation of the Union Cabinet.

The Union Government was of the view that continuation of the Harish Rawat government was "immoral and unconstitutional" after 18 March 2016, when the Uttarakhand Assembly Speaker Govind Singh Kunjwal declared the appropriation bill "passed" in controversial circumstances without allowing a division pressed for by 35 MLAs, including 9 rebel Congress legislators.

The Union Cabinet had held an emergency meeting on Saturday night presided over by Prime Minister Narendra Modi, who had cut short a visit to Assam to return to the New Delhi for the purpose.

The Cabinet considered several reports received from Governor Krishan Kant Paul, who had described the political situation as volatile and expressed apprehensions over possible pandemonium during the scheduled trial of strength in the Assembly on Monday.

The purported CD of the sting operation conducted against the Chief Minister that was in public domain on Saturday was understood to have been factored into the decision of the Cabinet which found it as a case of horse trading.

Additionally, two Uttarakhand MLAs, one each from Indian National Congress and Bharatiya Janata Party were suspended on 9 June for cross-voting during the floor test that was held on 10 May. Speaker Govind Singh Kunjwal suspended BJP MLA Bhim Lal Arya and INC MLA Rekha Arya.

=== Members resigned ===
| No. | Name | Party | Constituency |
|---|---|---|---|
| 1 | Amrita Rawat | Indian National Congress | Ramnagar |
| 2 | Harak Singh Rawat | Indian National Congress | Rudraprayag |
| 3 | Pradip Batra | Indian National Congress | Roorkee |
| 4 | Pranav Singh 'Champion' | Indian National Congress | Khanpur |
| 5 | Shaila Rani Rawat | Indian National Congress | Kedarnath |
| 6 | Shailendra Mohan Singhal | Indian National Congress | Jaspur |
| 7 | Subodh Uniyal | Indian National Congress | Narendranagar |
| 8 | Umesh Sharma 'Kau' | Indian National Congress | Raipur |
| 9 | Vijay Bahuguna | Indian National Congress | Sitarganj |

=== Members suspended ===
| No. | Name | Party | Constituency |
|---|---|---|---|
| 1 | Bhim Lal Arya | Bharatiya Janata Party | Ghansali |
| 2 | Rekha Arya | Indian National Congress | Someshwar |

== Outcome ==
The Harish Rawat government was reinstalled after a brief period of President's rule in the state.

== See also ==
- History of the Uttarakhand Legislative Assembly
- 2015–2016 Arunachal Pradesh political crisis
