= Rawat ministry =

Rawat ministry may refer to:

- Harish Rawat ministry, 8th government of Uttarakhand headed by Harish Rawat from 2014 to 2017
- T. S. Rawat ministry (disambiguation)
  - Trivendra Singh Rawat ministry, the 9th government of Uttarakhand headed by Trivendra Singh Rawat from 2017 to 2021
  - Tirath Singh Rawat ministry, the 10th government of Uttarakhand headed by Tirath Singh Rawat in 2021

== See also ==
- Harish Rawat
- Trivendra Singh Rawat
- Tirath Singh Rawat
