= Trivendra Singh Rawat ministry =

- 9th Ministry of Uttarakhand
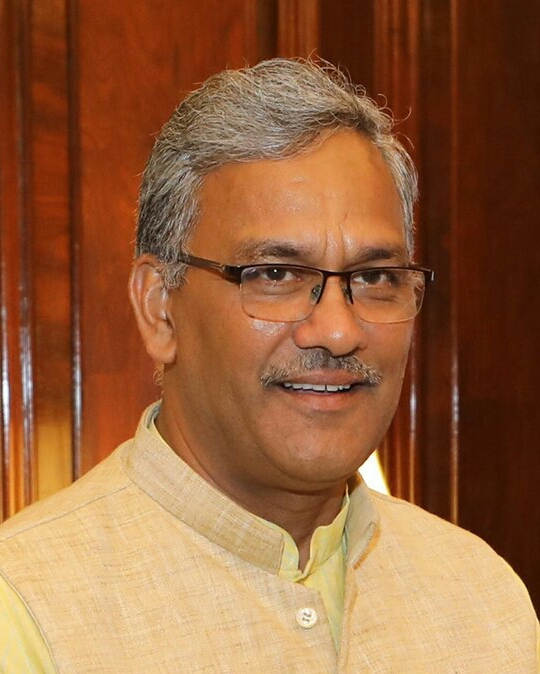
- Trivendra Singh Rawat
- Date formed: 17 March 2017
- Date dissolved: 10 March 2021

People and organisations
- Head of state: Krishan Kant Paul; Baby Rani Maurya
- Head of government: Trivendra Singh Rawat
- No. of ministers: 9
- Ministers removed: 1
- Total no. of members: 10
- Member parties: Bharatiya Janata Party
- Status in legislature: Majority
- Opposition party: Indian National Congress
- Opposition leader: Indira Hridayesh

History
- Election: 2017
- Legislature term: 5 years
- Incoming formation: 4th Assembly
- Predecessor: Harish Rawat ministry
- Successor: Tirath Singh Rawat ministry

The Trivendra Singh Rawat ministry was the Cabinet of Uttarakhand headed by the Chief Minister of Uttarakhand, Trivendra Singh Rawat from 2017 to 2021.

== Council of Ministers ==
Here is the list of ministers:

No.	Name	Constituency	Departments		Party
Chief Minister
1	Trivendra Singh Rawat	Doiwala	Home; Intelligence; Personnel and Establishment of All India Services Thematic Working; Vigilance; Law and Justice; State Government Judicial/Legal Field Nominations/Appointments; Secretariat Administration; General Administration; Good Governance, Corruption Eradication and Civil Services; Public Grievances; State Assets; Public Works; Rural Development; Information; Rural Works; Rural Roads and Drainage; Civil Aviation; Energy; Renewable Energy; Medical Services	Medical Education; Family Welfare; Disaster Management; Revenue and Land Management; Veterans Welfare; Paramilitary Welfare; Technical Education; Planning; External Aided Programmes; Prisons; Civil Defence and Homeguards; Consolidation in Hills Villages; Industrial Development; Micro, Small and Medium Scale Enterprises; Khadi and Village Industries; Food and Civil Supplies; Food Processing; Information Technology; Science and Technology; Bio Technology	BJP
1	Trivendra Singh Rawat	Doiwala	2019–2021		BJP
1	Trivendra Singh Rawat	Doiwala	Parliamentary Affairs; Legislative Affairs; Languages; Finance; Commercial Tax	Stamp and Registration; Entertainment Tax; Excise; Drinking Water and Sanitation; Sugarcane Development and Sugar Industries	BJP
Cabinet Ministers
2	Satpal Maharaj	Chaubattakhal	Irrigation; Flood Control; Minor Irrigation; Rain Water Harvesting; Water Management	India-Nepal-Uttarakhand River Projects; Tourism; Pilgrimage and Religious Fairs; Culture	BJP
3	Harak Singh Rawat	Kotdwar	Forests and Wildlife; Environmental and Solid Waste Management; Labour; Employment	Industrial Training; Ayush; Ayush Education	BJP
4	Madan Kaushik	Haridwar	Urban Development; Housing; Rajiv Gandhi Urban Housing Scheme	Census; Reorganisation; Elections	BJP
5	Yashpal Arya	Bajpur	Transportation; Social Welfare; Minority Welfare; Students Welfare	Rural Water Reservoirs Development; Remote Areas Development; Sub-Divisional Development and Management; Backward Areas Development	BJP
6	Arvind Pandey	Gadarpur	School Education; Adult Education; Sanskrit Education	Sports; Youth Welfare; Panchayati Raj	BJP
7	Subodh Uniyal	Narendranagar	Agriculture; Agricultural Marketing; Agricultural Processing	Agricultural Education; Plantation and Horticulture; Silk Development	BJP
Ministers of State (Independent Charge)
8	Rekha Arya	Someshwar	Women's Welfare and Child Development; Animal Husbandry; Sheep and Goat Husbandry	Fodder and Meadows Development; Fisheries	BJP
9	Dhan Singh Rawat	Srinagar	Co-operatives; Higher Education	Dairy Development; Protocol	BJP

== Former ministers ==
No.	Name	Constituency	Departments		Party
Cabinet Minister (2017–2019)
1	Prakash Pant	Pithoragarh	Parliamentary Affairs; Legislative Affairs; Languages; Finance; Commercial Tax	Stamp and Registration; Entertainment Tax; Excise; Drinking Water and Sanitation; Sugarcane Development and Sugar Industries	BJP
