= Dhami ministry =

Dhami ministry may refer to:

- First Dhami ministry, the 11th government of Uttarakhand headed by Pushkar Singh Dhami from 2021 to 2022
- Second Dhami ministry, the 12th government of Uttarakhand headed by Pushkar Singh Dhami from 2022 onwards
