= T. S. Rawat ministry =

T. S. Rawat ministry may refer to:

- Trivendra Singh Rawat ministry, the 9th government of Uttarakhand headed by Trivendra Singh Rawat from 2017 to 2021
- Tirath Singh Rawat ministry, the 10th government of Uttarakhand headed by Tirath Singh Rawat from 2021 onwards

== See also ==
- Rawat ministry (disambiguation)
- T. S. Rawat (disambiguation)
- Trivendra Singh Rawat
- Tirath Singh Rawat
