= Second Dhami ministry =

Second Pushkar Singh Dhami ministry

- 12th Ministry of Uttarakhand
- Incumbent
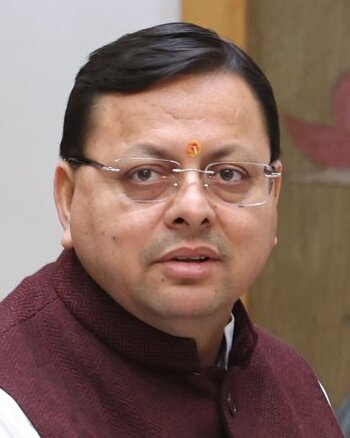
- Pushkar Singh Dhami
- Date formed: 23 March 2022

People and organisations
- Governor: Gurmit Singh
- Chief Minister: Pushkar Singh Dhami
- No. of ministers: 12
- Ministers removed: 2
- Member parties: BJP
- Status in legislature: Majority
- Opposition party: Indian National Congress
- Opposition leader: Yashpal Arya

History
- Outgoing formation: 5th Assembly
- Outgoing election: 2022
- Legislature terms: 4 years, 156 days
- Predecessor: First Dhami ministry

The Second Pushkar Singh Dhami ministry is the current Cabinet of Uttarakhand headed by the Chief Minister of Uttarakhand, Pushkar Singh Dhami.

== Council of Ministers ==
Portfolio	Minister	Took office	Left office	Party
Chief Minister and also in-charge of: Department of Personnel; Department of General Administration; Cabinet Secretariat; Department of Home Affairs; Department of Justice; Department of Planning; Department of Revenue; Department of Industries; Department of Mining; Department of Energy; Department of Information; Department of Labor; Department of Drinking Water; Department of Disaster Management and Rehabilitation; Department of Excise; Department of Civil Aviation; And other departments not allocated to any Minister.	Pushkar Singh Dhami	23 March 2022	Incumbent	BJP
Minister of Finance	Pushkar Singh Dhami	17 March 2025	Incumbent	BJP
Minister of Public Works Department; Minister of Panchayati Raj and Rural Construction; Minister of Irrigation; Minister of Tourism, Religious Affairs and Culture; Minister of Watershed Management	Satpal Maharaj	23 March 2022	Incumbent	BJP
Minister of Agriculture; Minister of Rural Development	Ganesh Joshi	23 March 2022	Incumbent	BJP
Minister of Basic and Secondary Education; Minister of Higher Education; Minister of Co-operation; Minister of Health and Medical Education	Dhan Singh Rawat	23 March 2022	Incumbent	BJP
Minister of Forest; Minister of Parliamentary Affairs; Minister of Election; Minister of Technical Education	Subodh Uniyal	23 March 2022	Incumbent	BJP
Minister of Women and Child Development; Minister of Food, Civil Supplies and Consumer Affairs; Minister of Sports and Youth Affairs	Rekha Arya	23 March 2022	Incumbent	BJP
Minister of Animal Husbandry, Dairying and Fisheries; Minister of Sugarcane Development and Sugar Industries; Minister of Protocol; Minister of Skill Development	Saurabh Bahuguna	23 March 2022	Incumbent	BJP
Minister of Disaster Management and Rehabilitation; Minister of Ayush and Ayush Education; Minister of Reorganization; Minister of Census	Madan Kaushik	20 March 2026	Incumbent	BJP
Minister of Rural Development; Minister of Small and Micro-Medium Enterprises; Minister of Khadi and Village Industries Language	Bharat Singh Chaudhary	20 March 2026	Incumbent	BJP
Minister of Transportation; Minister of Information Technology and Good Governance; Minister of Science and Technology; Minister of Biotechnology	Pradip Batra	20 March 2026	Incumbent	BJP
Minister of Social Welfare; Minister of Minority Welfare; Minister of Student Welfare; Minister of Languages Language	Khajan Dass	20 March 2026	Incumbent	BJP
Minister of Urban Development; Minister of Environmental Protection and Climate Change; Minister of Watershed Management	Ram Singh Kaira	20 March 2026	Incumbent	BJP

== Former Ministers ==
SI No.	Name	Constituency	Department	Tenure	Party	Reason
1.	Chandan Ram Das	Bageshwar	Minister of Social Welfare; Minister of Minority Welfare; Minister of Student Welfare; Minister of Transport; Minister of Micro, Small and Medium Enterprises; Minister of Khadi and Village Industries	23 March 2022 – 26 April 2023	BJP	Death
2.	Premchand Aggarwal	Rishikesh	Minister of Finance; Minister of Urban Development and Housing Affairs; Minister of Parliamentary Affairs; Minister of Census	23 March 2022 – 17 March 2025	BJP	Resigned

== Demographics of Council of Ministers ==
Following the cabinet expansion in 2026, the cabinet reached its maximum strength of 12 members.
