= Dhan Singh Negi =

Indian politician

- धन सिंह नेगी

Member of the Uttarakhand Legislative Assembly
- In office 12 March 2017 – 10 March 2022
- Preceded by: Dinesh Dhanai
- Succeeded by: Kishore Upadhyaya
- Constituency: Tehri

Chairman for Aanchal
- In office 2009–2012

Personal details
- Born: 4 May 1970 (age 55) Palkot, Patti Lamridhar, Tehri Garhwal, Uttar Pradesh (now in Uttarakhand), India
- Party: Bhartiya Janata Party (since 2024) (until 2022)
- Other political affiliations: Indian National Congress (2022-2024)
- Spouse: Anita Negi (m. 2000)
- Children: 2
- Education: M.Sc.(Physics), B.Ed.
- Alma mater: Hemvati Nandan Bahuguna Garhwal University
- Profession: Politician
- Website: dhansinghnegi.com

Dhan Singh Negi is an Indian politician who was a member of the Uttarakhand Legislative Assembly from 2017 to 2022 representing the Tehri constituency in Tehri Garhwal district. He is affiliated to the Bharatiya Janata Party (BJP), In the 2017 state assembly elections, he defeated Dinesh Dhanai, then Cabinet Minister by a large margin.

== Early life and education ==
Dhan Singh Negi was born in 1970 as the youngest child of a poor family in Palkot, a remote village in Patti Lamridhar, Tehri Garhwal, Uttar Pradesh (now Uttarakhand), India. His education includes a Master of Physics at Hemvati Nandan Bahuguna Garhwal University and a Bachelor of Education teaching qualification. He was awarded an honorary degree of Doctor of Philosophy in 2019.

== Career ==
Negi worked as a lecturer in Physics before becoming a full-time politician. He was a member of Badri-Kedar Temple Committee and was chairman of the Aanchal Milk Cooperative Society in Tehri Garhwal from 2009 to 2012. He was elected to the Uttarakhand Legislative Assembly in 2017, receiving 20,896 votes, defeating Dinesh Dhanai, then cabinet minister by a margin of 6,840 votes. In April 2017 he declared that he would donate half of his salary to support the marriages of daughters of widows, disabled and poor people.

He also presided over the Public Sector Units & Municipal Oversight and the Information Technology Policy committees of the Uttarakhand Assembly. Negi is a member of the board of Doon University and the Uttarakhand State Wildlife Board.

== Positions held ==
Year	Description
2009-2012	Elected as Chairman for Aanchal Milk Corporative Society (1st term)
2017-2022	Elected to 4th Uttarakhand Assembly (1st term): Member - Committee of Public Sector Units & Municipal Oversight; Member - Committee of Information Technology Policy; Member - Doon University & Uttarakhand State Wildlife Board

== Legislative Assembly Elections contested ==
Year	Constituency	Result	Vote percentage	Opposition Candidate	Opposition Party	Opposition vote percentage
2022	Tehri	Lost	13.64%	Kishore Upadhyaya	BJP	42.31%
2017	Tehri	Won	47.6%	Dinesh Dhanai	Independent	32.03%
2012	Tehri	Lost	24.3%	Dinesh Dhanai	Independent	28.8%
