= First Dhami ministry =

- 11th Ministry of Uttarakhand
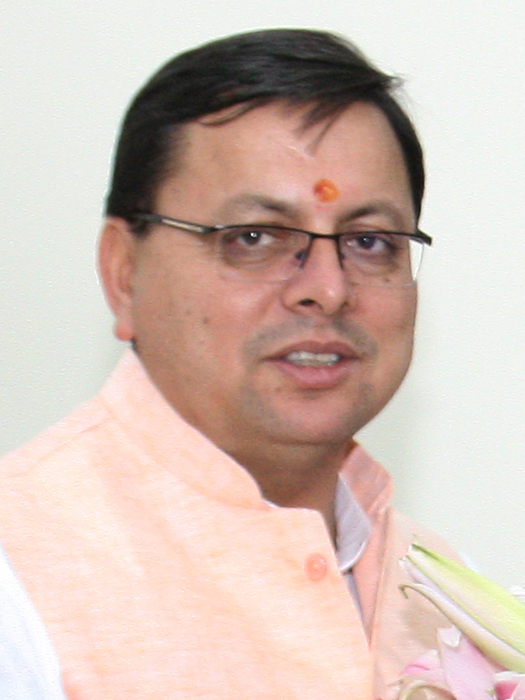
- Pushkar Singh Dhami
- Date formed: 4 July 2021
- Date dissolved: 23 March 2022

People and organisations
- Head of state: Baby Rani Maurya; Gurmit Singh
- Head of government: Pushkar Singh Dhami
- No. of ministers: 12
- Total no. of members: 12
- Member parties: Bharatiya Janata Party
- Status in legislature: Majority
- Opposition party: Indian National Congress
- Opposition leader: Pritam Singh

History
- Incoming formation: 4th Assembly
- Outgoing formation: 5th Assembly
- Outgoing election: 2022
- Legislature term: 5 years
- Predecessor: Tirath Singh Rawat ministry
- Successor: Second Dhami ministry

The First Pushkar Singh Dhami ministry was the Cabinet of Uttarakhand headed by the Chief Minister of Uttarakhand, Pushkar Singh Dhami.

== Council of Ministers ==
Cabinet
Portfolio	Minister	Took office	Left office	Party
Chief Minister and also in-charge of: Department of Home Affairs; Department of Finance; Department of Revenue; Department of Vigilance; Department of Technical Education; Department of Personnel; Department of Cabinet Affairs; Department of General Administration	Pushkar Singh Dhami	4 July 2021	23 March 2022	BJP
Minister of Public Works Department; Minister of Irrigation; Minister of Watershed Management; Minister of Tourism and Religious Affairs; Minister of Culture	Satpal Maharaj	4 July 2021	23 March 2022	BJP
Minister of Parliamentary Affairs; Minister of Food, Civil Supplies and Consumer Affairs; Minister of Urban Development and Housing; Minister of Science and Technology	Banshidhar Bhagat	4 July 2021	23 March 2022	BJP
Minister of Power; Minister of Environment and Forest; Minister of Labour and Employment; Minister of Skill Development; Minister of AYUSH	Harak Singh Rawat	4 July 2021	16 January 2022	BJP
Minister of Transport; Minister of Excise; Minister of Social Welfare; Minister of Minority Welfare	Yashpal Arya	4 July 2021	11 October 2021	BJP
Minister of Drinking Water; Minister of Rural Construction	Bishan Singh Chuphal	4 July 2021	23 March 2022	BJP
Minister of Education; Minister of Sports and Youth Welfare; Minister of Sanskrit Education; Minister of Panchayati Raj	Arvind Pandey	4 July 2021	23 March 2022	BJP
Minister of Agriculture; Minister of Food Processing; Minister of Horticulture and Sericulture	Subodh Uniyal	4 July 2021	23 March 2022	BJP
Minister of Industry; Minister of MSME; Minister of Sainik Welfare	Ganesh Joshi	4 July 2021	23 March 2022	BJP
Minister of Higher and Medical Education; Minister of Health and Family Welfare; Minister of Cooperatives; Minister of Disaster Management and Rehabilitation	Dhan Singh Rawat	4 July 2021	23 March 2022	BJP
Minister of Women and Child Development; Minister of Animal Husbandry, Dairying and Fisheries	Rekha Arya	4 July 2021	23 March 2022	BJP
Minister of Rural Development; Minister of Sugarcane Development and Sugar Industry	Yatishwaranand	4 July 2021	23 March 2022	BJP
