= Govind Singh Negi =

Indian politician

Govind Singh Negi was an Indian politician and leader of Communist Party of India (CPI). He was elected as a member of Uttar Pradesh Legislative Assembly from Tehri in 1969, 1974 and 1977.
