= Sadhana Naithani =

Indian folklorist and post-colonial theorist (born 1964)

- साधना नैथानी
- Born: Dehradun, Uttarakhand, Northern India

Academic work
- Discipline: Folklore, German studies, Postcolonialism
- Institutions: Jawaharlal Nehru University (JNU); Doon University
- Notable works: In Quest of Indian Folktales: Pandit Ram Gharib Chaube and William Crooke (2006); Folklore in Baltic History: Resistance and Resurgence (2019); The Inhuman Empire: Wildlife, Colonialism, Culture (2024)

Sadhana Naithani (born 1964) is an Indian ethnographer, folklorist, Indo-European post-colonial theorist and educator. She was president of the International Society for Folk Narrative Research (ISFNR) until 2024, coordinates the Folklore Unit at Jawaharlal Nehru University and established the School of Languages at Doon University. She originated the term "colonizer-folklorist."

== Biography ==
Naithani was born in 1964 in Dehradun, Uttarakhand, Northern India, and was raised speaking Hindi and English. She achieved her PhD in 1994 in German Folkloristics.

Naithani works as an associate professor at the Centre of German Studies, Jawaharlal Nehru University (JNU) in New Delhi, India, where she additionally coordinates the Folklore Unit.

In 2010, Naithani was nominated as a member of the Folklore Advisory Committee of the Finnish Academy of Science and Letters, based in Helsinki, Finland. She was president of the International Society for Folk Narrative Research (ISFNR) until 2024 and is an honorary fellow of the American Folklore Society (AFS). Naithani was invited to establish the School of Languages at Doon University in Dehradun, Uttarakhand, India in 2010.

In 1997, Naithani originated the term "colonizer-folklorist" to describe Richard Carnac Temple in an article.

In her book In Quest of Indian Folktales: Pandit Ram Gharib Chaube and William Crooke (2006), Naithani presented previously unknown and unpublished scholarship from colonial-era India, which she found during research in the archives of London's Folklore Society. She explored the long-term professional relationship between the British orientalist William Crooke and his "native" assistant Ram Gharib Chaube. Her work also included an anthology of North Indian folktales that had been collected by Crooke and Chaube.

In her book The Inhuman Empire: Wildlife, Colonialism, Culture (2024), Naithani theorised that the British Empire was built upon the destruction of Indian wildlife, for example with the body parts and skins of hunted tigers made into exotic commodities, expanding backwards on the potential time of the anthropocene. The book also compared ancient fables, such as Pañcatantra, with accounts from British hunters written between 1860 and 1960.

Naithani has written a novella, Elephantine (2016), which is based on her research into colonial forestry led by German scientists in the British Raj. She has also explored the magic charms with which people solve "karma problems."

Naithani has contributed articles to journals and news publications, such as The Times of India. She has also made two ethnographic films on contemporary German village life.

== Select publications ==
- Folktales of Northern India (2002)
- In Quest of Indian Folktales: Pandit Ram Gharib Chaube and William Crooke (2006)
- The Story-Time of the British Empire: Colonial and Post-Colonial Folkloristics (2010)
- Folklore Theory in Postwar Germany (2014)
- Folklore in Baltic History: Resistance and Resurgence (2019)
- The Inhuman Empire: Wildlife, Colonialism, Culture (2024)
