= Hemwati Nandan Bahuguna Garhwal University =

Central university in Srinagar, Uttarakhand, India

- Former name: Garhwal University
- Type: Central University
- Established: 1973; 53 years ago
- Accreditation: NAAC
- Affiliations: UGC, AIU, ACU
- Chancellor: Yogendra Narain
- Vice-Chancellor: Prakash Singh
- Visitor: President of India
- Location: Srinagar, Uttarakhand, India; 30.225441528581655°N 78.80389893533093°E
- Campus: Urban
- Website: hnbgu.ac.in

Hemwati Nandan Bahuguna Garhwal University (HNBGU) also known as Central University of Uttarakhand is a Central University, established in 1973, located in Srinagar in the Pauri Garhwal district of Uttarakhand in Northern India. The university is named after Hemwati Nandan Bahuguna, former Chief Minister of Uttar Pradesh. The university is residential cum affiliating with jurisdiction over Garhwal region. It is on the banks of the river Alaknanda in the mid-Himalayas. University intake is through examination including Joint Entrance Examination – Main (JEE Main) for School of Engineering & Technology, CAT and MAT. The university is A Graded with CGPA of 3.11 by the National Assessment and Accreditation Council (NAAC).

== History ==
The university was established in November 1973. It was renamed Hemvati Nandan Bahuguna Garhwal University in 1989 in commemoration of the memory of a leading statesman Hemvati Nandan Bahuguna. In 2009, Garhwal University was declared a Central University pursuant to the Central Universities Act. Recently the university has celebrated its Golden Jubilee Year and an exclusive documentary has recorded the progress of the University (https://www.youtube.com/watch?v=5FGlTHz5Lt4).

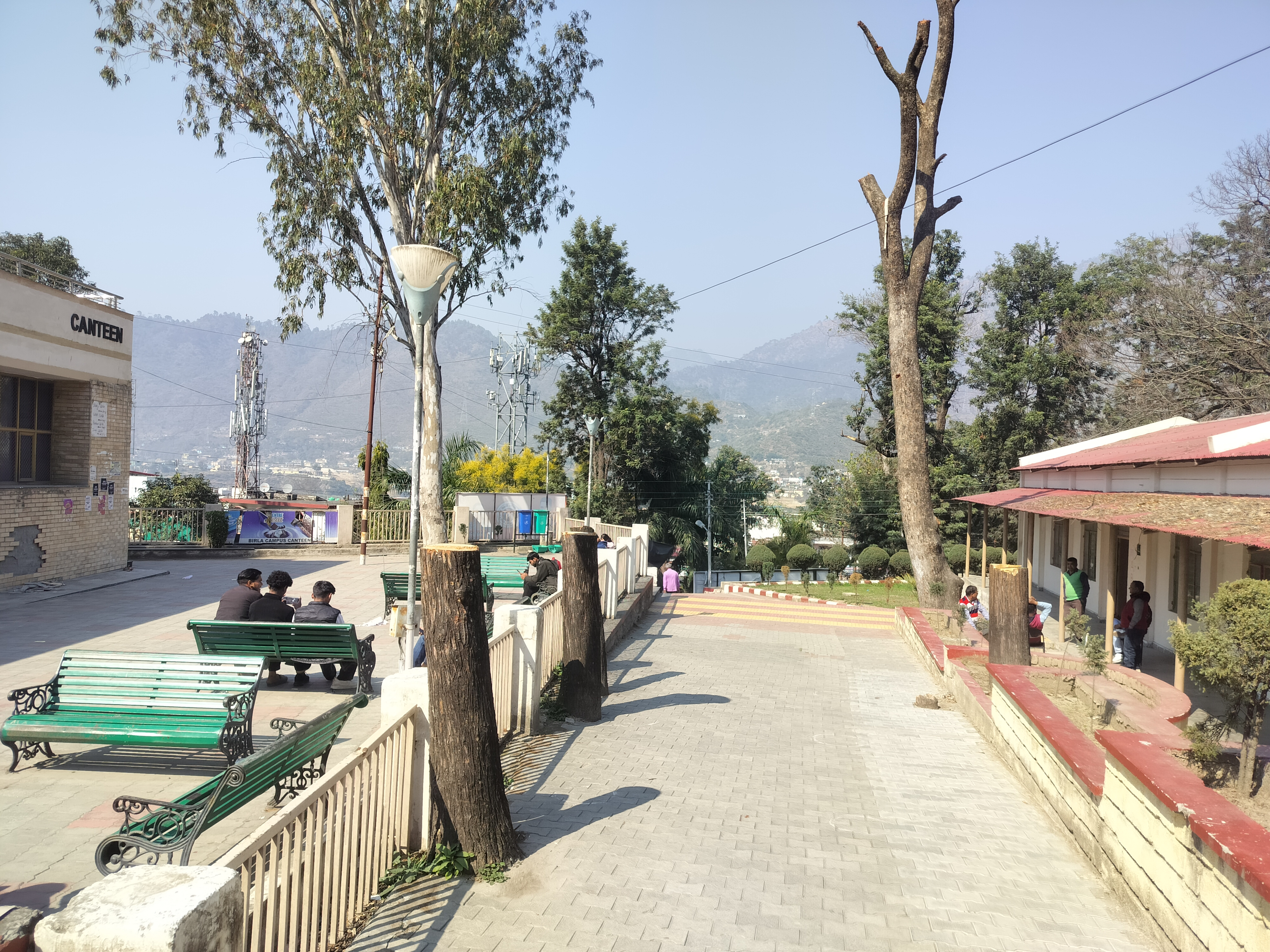
The Green Chairs at Campus Canteen, Birla Campus

== Campus ==
The university is a residential cum affiliating institution of higher learning. It has jurisdiction over seven districts of Garhwal region of Uttarakhand. Its headquarters are at Srinagar, 112.9 km (70.2 mi) from Rishikesh along the Delhi-Mana National Highway. The university has three campuses: Birla Campus, Srinagar Garhwal with its extension at Chauras Campus, B. Gopal Reddy Campus, Pauri and Swami Ram Teerth (SRT) Campus, Badshahithaul, Tehri. In addition, there are 121 colleges and institutes affiliated to it, spreading over seven districts of Garhwal region of Uttarakhand. The university offers undergraduate, post-graduate and research programmes in several various disciplines. Besides conventional courses under different streams of studies, the University has introduced some regionally relevant courses that are of greater significance for the mountainous areas.

- Birla Campus – located at Srinagar (Garhwal) bisected into the Main Campus and the Chauras Campus by river Alaknanda. These campuses are 4.2 km (2.6 mi)apart.
- B. Gopal Reddy Campus – on mountain slopes at Pauri (Garhwal), 30 km (19 mi) from Srinagar (Garhwal) and 105.4 km (65.5 mi) from Kotdwar, the nearest railway station
- Swami Ram Teerth Campus – located at Badshahi Thaul (Tehri Garhwal) amidst dense pine forest (85 km (53 mi) from Srinagar (Garhwal) and 65 km (40 mi) from Rishikesh on the route to Gangotri)

== Organisation and administration ==
=== Schools ===
- School of Agriculture and Allied Sciences
- School of Sciences [Departments: Chemistry, Home Science, Mathematics, Physics, Pharmaceutical Sciences, Pharmaceutical Chemistry, Statistics]
- School of Commerce
- School of Earth Sciences
- School of Education
- School of Engineering and Technology
- School of Arts, Communication and Languages
- School of Humanities and Social Sciences
- School of Law
- School of Life Sciences
- School of Management

== Facilities ==
=== Research facility ===
University Science Instrument Centre provides research facilities for research-oriented students.

=== Central facilities ===
- Central Library
- Computer Centre
- University Sports Board
- Guest House
- University dispensary
- University Science Instrument Centre
- University Career Counseling and Placement Service

== Student life ==
=== Students' Union ===
The Student Apex Body is the group of student leaders presiding over all the student unions of the colleges that are affiliated to HNB Garhwal University. The members of the apex body are elected by an indirect election amongst the university representatives coming from each college. There are about 161 colleges affiliated to HNB Garhwal University. Student Union in HNBGU University Campuses are directly elected by voting of students reading here.

- Dhan Singh Negi, former MLA for Tehri
- Ramesh Pokhriyal Nishank, former Union Education Minister.
- Yogi Adityanath (former name: Ajay Mohan Bisht), Chief Minister of Uttar Pradesh.
- Tirath Singh Rawat, former Chief Minister of Uttarakhand.
- Trivendra Singh Rawat, former Chief Minister of Uttarakhand.
- Dhan Singh Rawat, Minister of Higher Education, Government of Uttarakhand.
- Raghav Juyal, Indian Dancer, Choreographer and Actor.
- Shankar, Indian film actor
- Anshul Jubli, UFC fighter.
- Shubham Singh Pundir, SSP CLASSES
