= Harish Rawat ministry =

Cabinet of Uttarakhand from 2014–2017

- 8th Ministry of Uttarakhand
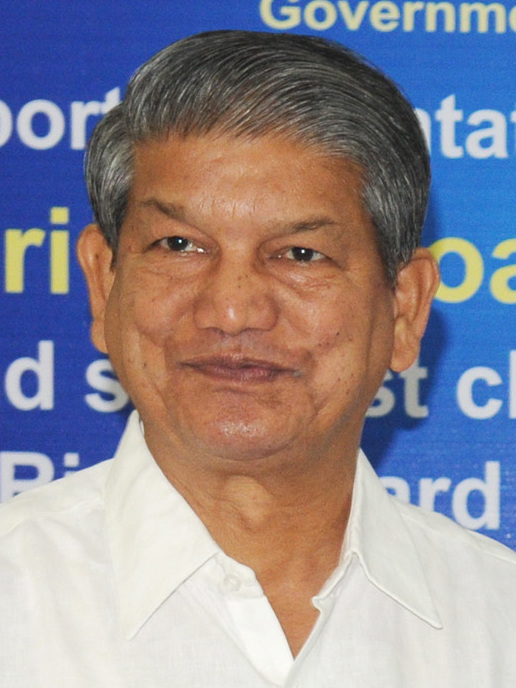
- Harish Rawat
- Date formed: 1 February 2014
- Date dissolved: 17 March 2017

People and organisations
- Head of state: Aziz Qureshi; Krishan Kant Paul
- Head of government: Harish Rawat
- No. of ministers: 10
- Ministers removed: 2
- Member parties: Indian National Congress; Uttarakhand Kranti Dal (P); Independents
- Status in legislature: Majority
- Opposition cabinet: Bharatiya Janata Party
- Opposition leader: Ajay Bhatt

History
- Outgoing election: 2017
- Legislature term: 5 years
- Incoming formation: 3rd Assembly
- Outgoing formation: 4th Assembly
- Predecessor: Bahuguna ministry
- Successor: Trivendra Singh Rawat ministry

The Harish Rawat ministry was the Cabinet of Uttarakhand headed by the Chief Minister of Uttarakhand, Harish Rawat from 2014 to 2017.

== Council of Ministers ==
Here is the list of ministers:

Colour key for parties
Indian National Congress
Uttarakhand Kranti Dal (P)
Independents

No.	Name Portfolio (Constituency)	Departments & Works Allotted (Ministries)		Age	Party
1	Harish Rawat; Chief Minister (Dharchula)	Good Governance, Corruption Eradication and Civil Services; Intelligence; Personnel and Establishment of All India Services Thematic Working; State Government Judicial/Legal Field Nominations/Appointments; Vigilance; General Administration; State Assets; Information; Industrial Development; Disaster Management and Rehabilitation; Agriculture; Agricultural Marketing; Agricultural Education; Parks; Horticulture	Transportation; Information Technology; Environmental and Solid Waste Management; Minority Welfare; Remote Areas Development; Sub-Divisional Development and Management; Sheep and Goat Husbandry; Social Welfare; Rural Water Reservoirs Development; Food Processing; Silk Development; Veterans Welfare; Rain Water Conservation; Consolidation in Hills Villages; Bio Technology	69	Indian National Congress
2	Indira Hridayesh; Cabinet Minister (Haldwani)	Finance; Commercial Tax; Stamps and Registration; Entertainment Tax; Parliamentary Affairs; Legislative Affairs	Elections; Census; Languages; Protocol; Higher Education; Planning	75	Indian National Congress
3	Yashpal Arya; Cabinet Minister (Bajpur)	Revenue and Land Management; Irrigation; Flood Control; Co-operatives	Technical Education; Rural Engineering Services; Rural Roads and Drainage; Indo-Nepal-Uttarakhand River Projects	64	Indian National Congress
4	Surendra Singh Negi; Cabinet Minister (Kotdwar)	Medical Services; Family Welfare; Ayush; Ayurvedic and Unani Education	Science and Technology; Sugarcane Development and Sugar Industries; Paramilitary Welfare	62	Indian National Congress
5	Pritam Singh; Cabinet Minister (Chakrata)	Food and Civil Supplies; Minor Irrigation; Rural Development	Panchayati Raj; Home; Backward Areas Development	58	Indian National Congress
6	Dinesh Dhanai; Cabinet Minister (Tehri)	Tourism; Culture; Management of Pilgrimage and Religious Fairs; Women Empowerment and Child Development	Renewable Energy; Youth Welfare; External Aided Programmes	45	Independent
7	Dinesh Agrawal; Cabinet Minister (Dharampur)	Sports; Forests and Wild Life	Law and Justice	67	Indian National Congress
8	Mantri Prasad Naithani; Cabinet Minister (Devprayag)	School Education; Adult Education; Sanskrit Education	Drinking Water and Sanitation; Students Welfare	59	Independent
9	Pritam Singh Panwar; Cabinet Minister; Yamunotri	Urban Development; Rajiv Gandhi Urban Housing Scheme; Animal Husbandry; Fisheries	Fodder and Meadows Development; Civil Defence and Homeguards; Prisons	48	Uttarakhand Kranti Dal (P)
10	Harish Chandra Durgapal; Cabinet Minister (Lalkuan)	Labour; Employment; Micro and Small Enterprises	Khadi and Village Industries; Dairy Development; Industrial Training	75	Independent
