= Ambrish Kumar =

Indian politician

Ambrish Kumar (died 21 July 2021) was an Indian politician from Uttarakhand and former MLA of the Uttarakhand Legislative Assembly from Haridwar.

He was a member of the Indian National Congress. He had contested 2019 Indian general election as a candidate of Indian National Congress from Haridwar Lok Sabha constituency and lost the election to Former Union Minister Ramesh Pokhriyal.

Kumar died in 2021 from COVID-19.

== Elections contested ==
Year	Election Type	Constituency	Result	Vote percentage	Opposition Candidate	Opposition Party	Opposition vote percentage
1991	MLA	Haridwar	Lost	34.09%	Jagdish Muni	BJP	42.60%
1996	MLA	Haridwar	Lost	30.09%	Jagdish Muni	BJP	40.21%
1996	MLA	Haridwar	Won	40.58%	Jagdish Muni	BJP	23.80%
2002	MLA	Haridwar	Lost	16.06%	Madan Kaushik	BJP	31.26%
2007	MLA	Haridwar	Lost	18.18%	Madan Kaushik	BJP	49.84%
2009	MP	Haridwar	Lost	4.67%	Harish Rawat	INC	42.16%
2012	MLA	BHEL Ranipur	Lost	25.50%	Adesh Chauhan	BJP	34.01%
2017	MLA	BHEL Ranipur	Lost	33.31%	Adesh Chauhan	BJP	54.84%
2019	MP	Haridwar	Lost	32.01%	Dr. Ramesh Pokhriyal 'Nishank'	BJP	52.37%
