= T. S. Rawat =

T. S. Rawat may refer to:

- Tejpal Singh Rawat; retired Indian Army general and politician
- Tirath Singh Rawat; 9th Chief Minister of Uttarakhand
- Trivendra Singh Rawat; 8th Chief Minister of Uttarakhand

== See also ==
- T. S. Rawat ministry (disambiguation)
