= Amrita Rawat =

Indian politician

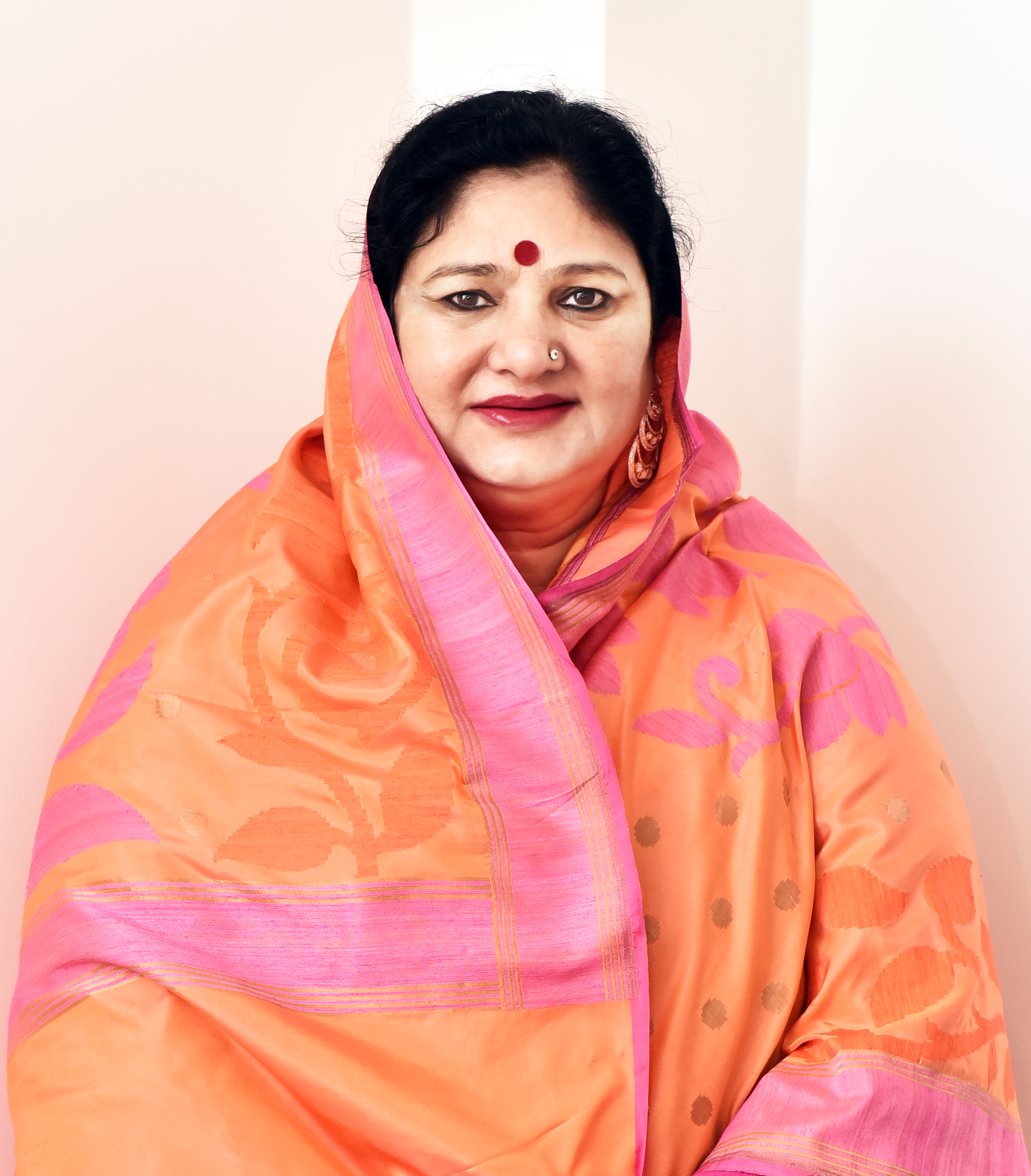

Member of the Uttarakhand Legislative Assembly
- In office 2002–2012
- Preceded by: Constituency established
- Succeeded by: Constituency disestablished
- Constituency: Bironkhal

Personal details
- Born: 10 August 1958 (age 68) Ekeshwar, Pauri Garhwal, Uttarakhand
- Party: Bharatiya Janata Party
- Spouse: Shri Satpal Maharaj
- Children: Shradhey, Suyesh
- Parent: Late Sh. Kunwar Singh Rawat (Senior Scientist) (father)
- Relatives: Prem Rawat (brother-in-law); Hans Maharaj (father-in-law)
- Nickname: Shri Amrita Mata ji

Amrita Rawat (born 10 August 1958), also known as Shri Amrita Mata ji (by her followers), was a Member of the Legislative Assembly of Uttarakhand, India. Shri Amrita Rawat is married to Shri Satpal Maharaj.

== Political activities ==
- In 1978, Elected as Joint Secretary of Students Union of Degree College for Girls, Kanpur.
- In 2002, Shri Amrita Rawat entered active politics during the first elections of Uttarakhand Legislative Assembly as an Indian National Congress candidate. She, Won the election (from Bironkhal, Garhwal Seat) with record votes. She was made the Minister of state with important portfolios like Energy, Women Empowerment, Irrigation and Child Welfare.
- In 2007, she was elected for the second time as MLA from Bironkhal Constituency.
- In 2012, again was elected from Ramnagar Assembly Constituency and continued as a cabinet minister with portfolios like Tourism, Horticulture, Culture, Alternative Energy, Child Welfare and Women Empowerment in state of Uttarakhand.
- In 2012, Shri Amrita Rawat was looking after alternative energy and tourism ministry of Uttarakhand. until in May 2014, when Harish Rawat dismissed Shri Amrita Rawat because her husband Shri Satpal Maharaj quit Indian National Congress and joined Bharatiya Janata Party
- On 18 May 2016, Amrita Rawat Joined Bharatiya Janata Party quitting Indian National Congress.

== Role in stabilization of Uttarakhand during hardship ==
- In 1989, she helped the victims of land slides and flood in the valley of Pinder in Chamoli District of Uttarakhand.
- In 1990, she helped the sufferers of heavy rains in Neelkanth.
- In 1991, she helped the victims of the most destructive earthquake in Uttarkashi, Tehri, Rudraprayag and Chamoli districts by opening relief camps for the people living under the sky, by providing them with food articles, blankets, trampolines, medicines and free medical camps.
- In 1994, she participated in the movement for formation of separate Uttarakhand State and joined as a padyatri with Shri Satpal Maharaj in the Shrandhanjai Padyatra from Gopeshwar to Narsan. She stood with the people who participated in the movement which showed her commitment to the formation of separate Uttarakhand.
- In 1998, she helped the sufferers of ruinous landslides in Ukhimath.
- In 1999, she helped the victims of the most catastrophic earthquake in the district Chamoli showing her spirit of helping the affected victims of the natural disaster.

Shri Amrita Rawat along with Shri Satpal Maharaj and Manav Utthan Sewa Samiti have helped the people as a representative of the people of la India.

== Awards and recognition ==
- She had also been selected for the best MLA in 2011
- Kumaon Hills won the Award for "Best Mountain/Hill destination in India", by CNBC travel awards in 2012, under the leadership of Shri Amrita Rawat as she was Tourism minister of the state, she received the award for the state.
