= Kishore Upadhyaya =

Indian politician (born 1958)

Kishore Upadhyay
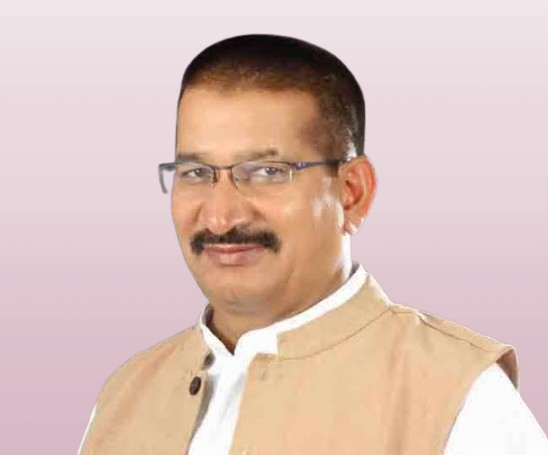

Member of Legislative Assembly for Tehri
- Incumbent
- Assumed office 2022
- Preceded by: Dhan Singh Negi
- In office 2002–2012
- Preceded by: Lakhiram Joshi
- Succeeded by: Dinesh Dhanai

President Uttarakhand Pradesh Congress Committee
- In office 13 June 2014 – 4 May 2017
- Preceded by: Yashpal Arya
- Succeeded by: Pritam Singh

Personal details
- Born: 1 June 1958 (age 68) Tehri, Uttar Pradesh, India (now in Uttarakhand, India)
- Party: Bharatiya Janata Party (2022- Present)
- Other political affiliations: Indian National Congress (2002-2022)

Kishore Upadhyaya (born 1 June 1958) is an Indian politician and Member of the Legislative Assembly representing Tehri in the Uttarakhand Legislative Assembly. He is a member of the Bharatiya Janata Party. He has been elected three times to represent Tehri, in 2002, 2007 and 2022. In 2012 Assembly election, he lost to Dinesh Dhanai an independent candidate by 377 votes. He served as the Minister of state for Industrial Development under N. D. Tiwari ministry from 2002 to 2004.

Kishore Upadhyaya was the President of Uttarakhand Pradesh Congress Committee from 2014 to 2017, taking over from Yashpal Arya.

== Positions held ==
Year	Description
2002 - 2007	Elected to 1st Uttarakhand Assembly: Minister - Industrial Development (2002–04); Member - Committee on Government Assurances (2004–07); Member - Committee on Assembly Rules (2004–07)
2007 - 2012	Elected to 2nd Uttarakhand Assembly (2nd term): Member - Committee on PSE and Corporate (2007–08); Member - Committee on Assembly Rules (2008–12)
2022 - 2027	Elected to 5th Uttarakhand Assembly (3rd term)

== Elections contested ==
Year	Constituency	Result	Vote percentage	Opposition Candidate	Opposition Party	Opposition vote percentage
2002	Tehri	Won	41.95%	Ratan Singh Gunsola	BJP	31.41%
2007	Tehri	Won	35.31%	Khem Singh Chauhan	BJP	28.14%
2012	Tehri	Lost	28.83%	Dinesh Dhanai	IND	29.77%
2017	Sahaspur	Lost	23.30%	Sahdev Singh Pundir	BJP	40.75%
2022	Tehri	Won	42.31%	Dinesh Dhanai	UJP	40.28%

Party political offices
Preceded by Yashpal Arya	President; Uttarakhand Pradesh Congress Committee; 13 June 2014 – 4 May 2017	Succeeded by Pritam Singh
