= Dinesh Dhanai =

Indian politician

- दिनेश धनै
- In office 2012–2017
- Preceded by: Kishore Upadhyaya
- Succeeded by: Dhan Singh Negi
- Constituency: Tehri

Personal details
- Born: Village-Khand Patti, Tehri Garhwal district, India
- Party: Bharatiya Janata Party (since 2024)
- Other political affiliations: Indian National Congress (1986–2003)
- Parent(s): Gabbar Singh Dhanai and Phool Devi

Dinesh Dhanai is an Indian politician and a member of the Bharatiya Janata Party. He ran as an independent MLA in Tehri (2012–2017) and served as a minister in Uttarakhand from 2012 until 2017.

== Political career ==
Dhanai joined the Indian National Congress in 1986 at Garhwal University. Over the years, he has held several positions, such as joint secretary, UP Youth Congress (2nd term) in 1994; chairman — Urban Co-Operative Bank Ltd., Tehri Garhwal in 1995; vice president, UP Youth Congress, 1999.

In 2003, he stood as an independent candidate from Tehri Nagar Palika, defeating both Congress and BJP candidates, going on to serve until 2008. During his chairmanship, he contested legislative assembly elections in 2007 as an independent and came in third place. Dhanai again ran as an independent for the same seat in 2012, this time successfully. In 2014, he was inducted into Harish Rawat's cabinet.

In 2019, Dhanai announced the formation of a new political party, the Uttarakhand Jan Ekta Party, with the intent of representing issues relating to the state of Uttarakhand on the national level. The party was merged with the Bharatiya Janata Party in 2024.
