= Tirath Singh Rawat ministry =

- 10th Ministry of Uttarakhand
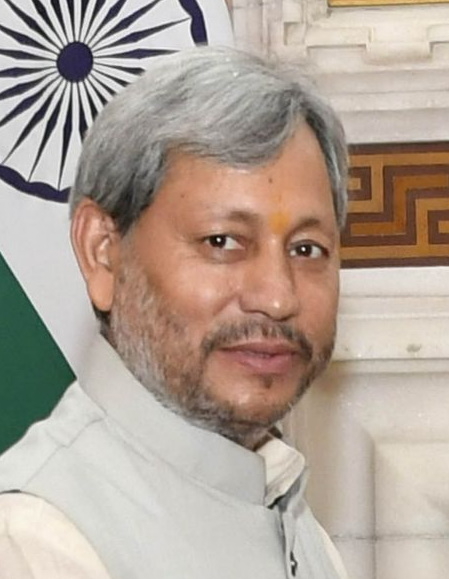
- Tirath Singh Rawat
- Date formed: 10 March 2021
- Date dissolved: 3 July 2021

People and organisations
- Head of state: Baby Rani Maurya
- Head of government: Tirath Singh Rawat
- No. of ministers: 12
- Total no. of members: 12
- Member parties: Bharatiya Janata Party
- Status in legislature: Majority
- Opposition party: Indian National Congress
- Opposition leader: Indira Hridayesh

History
- Incoming formation: 4th Assembly
- Legislature term: 5 years
- Predecessor: Trivendra Singh Rawat ministry
- Successor: First Dhami ministry

The Tirath Singh Rawat ministry was the ministry in the Cabinet of Uttarakhand headed by the Chief Minister of Uttarakhand, Tirath Singh Rawat in 2021.

== Council of Ministers ==
Name	Office	Portfolio	Took Office	Left Office	Party
Tirath Singh Rawat	Chief Minister	Home Affairs; Finance; Revenue; Public Works; Medical Health and Medical Education; Vigilance; Revenue; Food and Civil Supplies; Technical Education; Justice; Excise; Rural Development; Civil Aviation; Energy; Planning; Secretariat Administration; General Administration; Rural Development; All other departments not allocated to any Minister	10 March 2021	4 July 2021	Bharatiya Janata Party
Satpal Maharaj	Cabinet Minister	Tourism; Irrigation; Flood Control; Minor Irrigation; Watershed Management; India–Nepal Uttarakhand River Projects; Culture and Religion	16 March 2021	4 July 2021	Bharatiya Janata Party
Banshidhar Bhagat	Cabinet Minister	Legislative Affairs; Food and Civil Supplies; Urban Development; Housing; Information and Science Technology	16 March 2021	4 July 2021	Bharatiya Janata Party
Harak Singh Rawat	Cabinet Minister	Forest; Environmental Protection and Climate Change; Labour; Skill Development; AYUSH; AYUSH Education	16 March 2021	4 July 2021	Bharatiya Janata Party
Bishan Singh Chuphal	Cabinet Minister	Drinking Water; Rainwater Harvesting; Rural Construction; Census	16 March 2021	4 July 2021	Bharatiya Janata Party
Yashpal Arya	Cabinet Minister	Transport; Social Welfare; Minority Welfare; Students' Welfare; Election	16 March 2021	4 July 2021	Bharatiya Janata Party
Arvind Pandey	Cabinet Minister	Primary Education; Basic Education; Sports; Youth Welfare; Panchayat Raj; Sanskrit Education	16 March 2021	4 July 2021	Bharatiya Janata Party
Subodh Uniyal	Cabinet Minister	Agriculture; Agricultural Education; Agricultural Marketing; Horticulture; Food Processing; Fruit Industry; Sericulture; Biotechnology	16 March 2021	4 July 2021	Bharatiya Janata Party
Ganesh Joshi	Cabinet Minister	Sainik Welfare; Industrial Development; Micro, Small and Medium Enterprises; Khadi and Village Industries	16 March 2021	4 July 2021	Bharatiya Janata Party
Dhan Singh Rawat	Minister of State (Independent Charge)	Higher Education; Co-operative; Protocol; Disaster Management; Rehabilitation	16 March 2021	4 July 2021	Bharatiya Janata Party
Rekha Arya	Minister of State (Independent Charge)	Women Empowerment and Child Development; Animal Husbandry; Milk Development; Fisheries	16 March 2021	4 July 2021	Bharatiya Janata Party
Yatishwaranand	Minister of State (Independent Charge)	Languages; Reorganization; Sugarcane Development; Sugarcane Industry	16 March 2021	4 July 2021	Bharatiya Janata Party
