= Trepan Singh Negi =

Indian politician (1923–1996)

Trepan Singh Negi (17 March 1923 – 3 February 1996) was an Indian politician. He was a member of the 6th and 7th Lok Sabha. He represented the Tehri Garhwal Lok Sabha Constituency and was a member of the Congress political party. He was elected to the 2nd, 3rd, and 4th Uttar Pradesh Assembly from Tehri Assembly Constituency.

== Positions ==
Year	Description
1950	Nominated to the 1st Uttar Pradesh Assembly
1957	Elected to the 2nd Uttar Pradesh Assembly
1962	Elected to the 3rd Uttar Pradesh Assembly
1967	Elected to the 4th Uttar Pradesh Assembly
1977	Elected to the 6th Lok Sabha
1980	Elected to the 7th Lok Sabha

== Early life ==
Trepan Singh Negi was born in Dalla, Uttarakhand on 17 March 1923. He was the son of Shri Hari Singh Negi and Smt. Savitri Devi. He attended Mendadhar Basic School, Dalla, and his secondary education came at Uttarkashi. He attended High School and Intermediate: Pratap Inter College, Tehri (1942) and (1944). He earned a Bachelor of Arts degree in Lahore (1945–1947) and a Bachelor of Law (Advocacy) degree in Lucknow (1952-1955).

== Protests ==
Negi discussed the abandonment of merit scholarships in protest against the monarchy in 1941. Additionally, he wanted to make Tehri an independent, princely state.

Negi played a key role in the Praja Mandal movement under the leadership of Sridevi Suman in 1941. During his education in Lahore, he worked openly for Praja Mandal and remained underground.

== Freedom Movement ==
Negi played an important role in the freedom movement while living in Praja Mandal. In 1947, when the country became independent, the Praja Mandal started a movement in Tehri against the separation of Tehri state from the Union of India which led to arrests of its members. To keep the movement alive, Negi along with Kushal Singh Rangad escaped through the forest.

Negi participated in organizing workers in Mussoorie against the Tehri monarchy.

== Kirtinagar incident ==
Trepan Singh Negi was sent to Tehri Jail. The state government released him after 60+ days of imprisonment.

Negi had vowed that he would not return home until the princely state of Tehri became independent. He led a protest to Kirtinagar and narrowly escaped indiscriminate firing by the constables. He was hit by a bullet and suffered a serious head injury.

On 15 January 1948, Negi led the funeral procession of Nagendra Saklani and Molu Bhandari, followed by a crowd of thousands. He, along with thousands of mourners, lit fire to the pyre. From that day people accepted Negi as their leader.

In 1948, the Praja Mandal President was elected.

== Personal life and death ==
Negi married Gangotri Devi in 1930. He died in Narendranagar on 3 February 1996, at the age of 72.
