= Bhim Lal Arya =

Indian politician

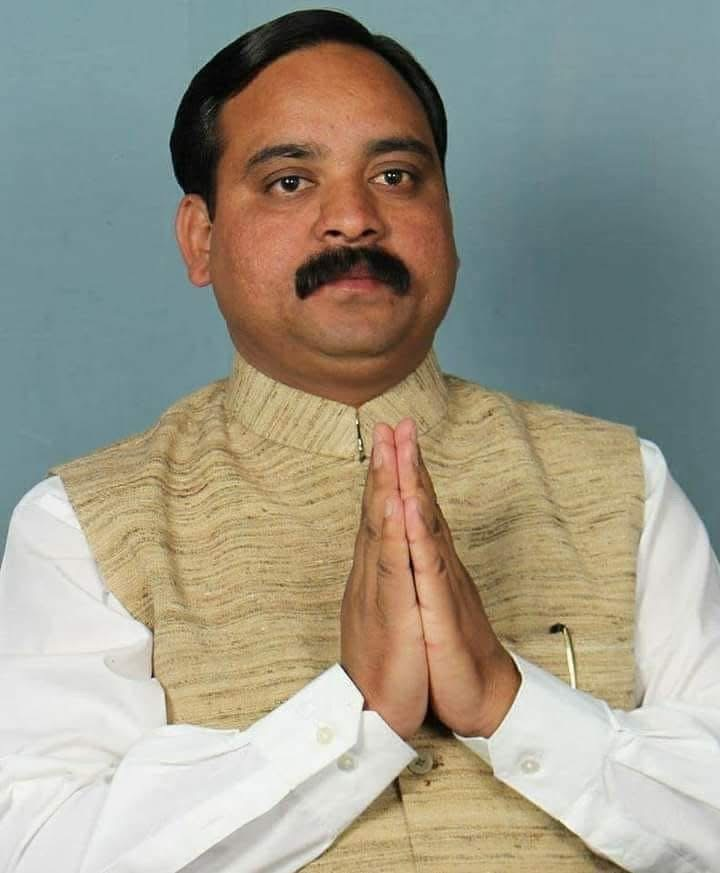
- Arya in 2016

Member of the Uttarakhand Legislative Assembly
- In office 2012–2016
- Constituency: Ghansali (SC)

Personal details
- Party: Bharatiya Janata Party (BJP) (2012–2014); Indian National Congress (INC) (2014–2016) (since 2026)

Bhim Lal Arya is an Indian politician and member of the Indian National Congress. Arya was a member of the Uttarakhand Legislative Assembly from the Ghansali constituency in Tehri Garhwal district as a member of the Bharatiya Janata Party.

== Personal Background ==
- Father's Name: Abbal Das
- Education Level: Completed 12th Grade
- Occupation: Agriculture
- Total Assets: ₹1.11 crore, Total Liabilities: ₹54 lakh

== Legal Matters ==
Bhim Lal Arya is facing a criminal case.

== Related Topics ==
- Ghansali (SC)
- Uttarakhand Assembly constituency
- Politics of Uttarakhand
