= Manav Utthan Sewa Samiti =

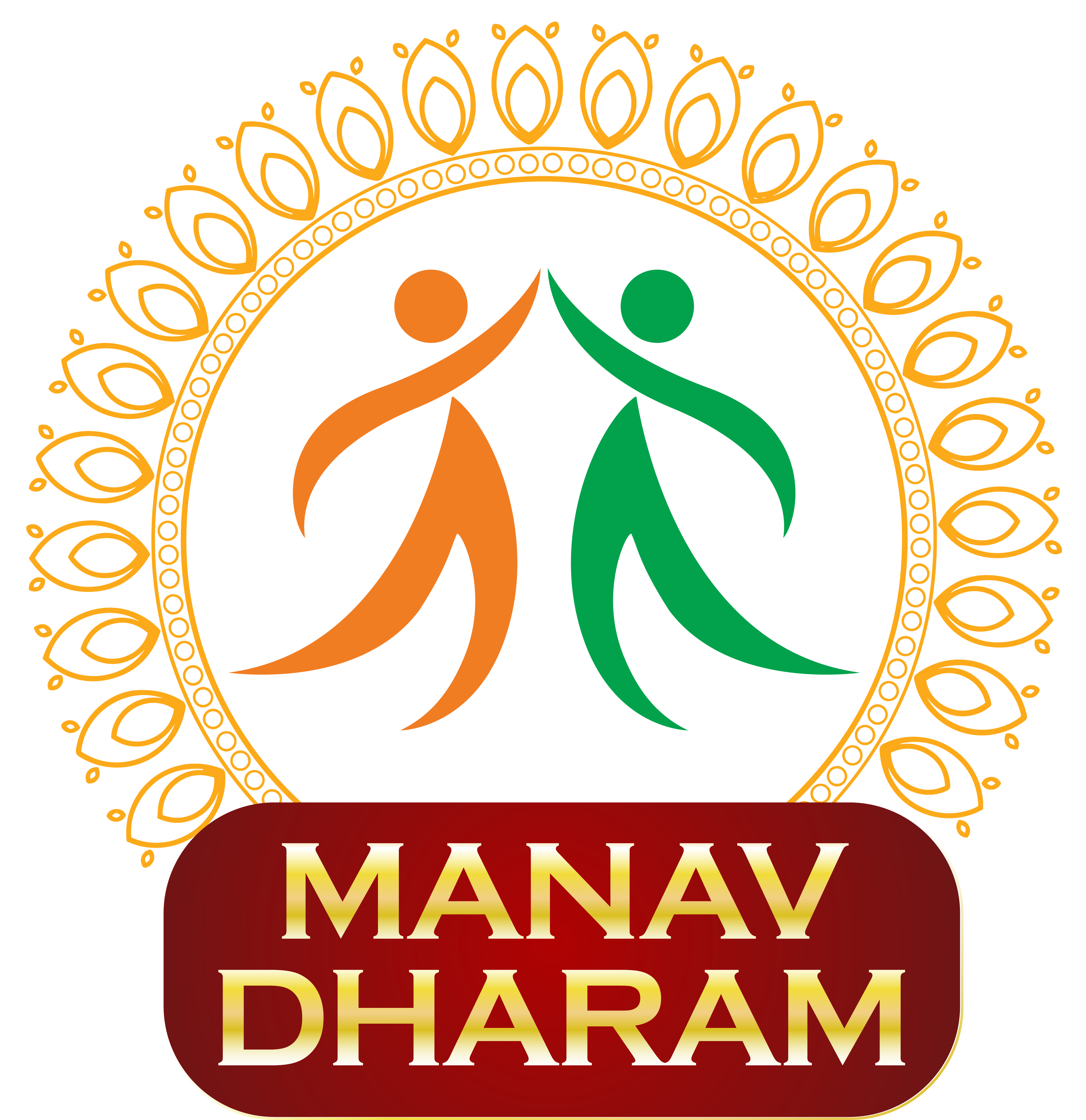
- Established: 1975
- Founder: Shri Satpal Maharaj
- Founded at: 2/12, East Punjabi Bagh, Delhi - 11026, India
- Type: Socio-Spiritual
- Legal status: Non-Profit Organisation
- Purpose: Humanitairan and Socio-Sprititual Activities
- Headquarters: 2/12, East Punjabi Bagh, Delhi -110026, India
- Location: Delhi, India
- Region served: Worldwide
- Services: Social Activities and Spiritual Awkening
- Led by: Shri Satpal Ji Maharaj
- Key people: Shri Satpal Ji Maharaj
- Main organ: Manav Sewa Dal (M.S.D.)
- Website: Manav Dharam's Official Website

Manav Utthan Sewa Samiti (M.U.S.S.) is an all-India registered voluntary non-profit social welfare and charitable organization established under Indian Societies Registration Act of 1860 under the leadership & inspiration of Shri Satpal Ji Maharaj. Its primary function is to organize spiritual gatherings all over India and Nepal, at which representatives of other religious and social organizations, as well as political leaders, are also invited to speak.

In addition, through its network of more than 3000 Ashrams and centers and its volunteer division (Manav Sewa Dal), it attempts to serve society at both the spiritual and everyday levels in a variety of ways.

== Sadbhawana Sammelan ==
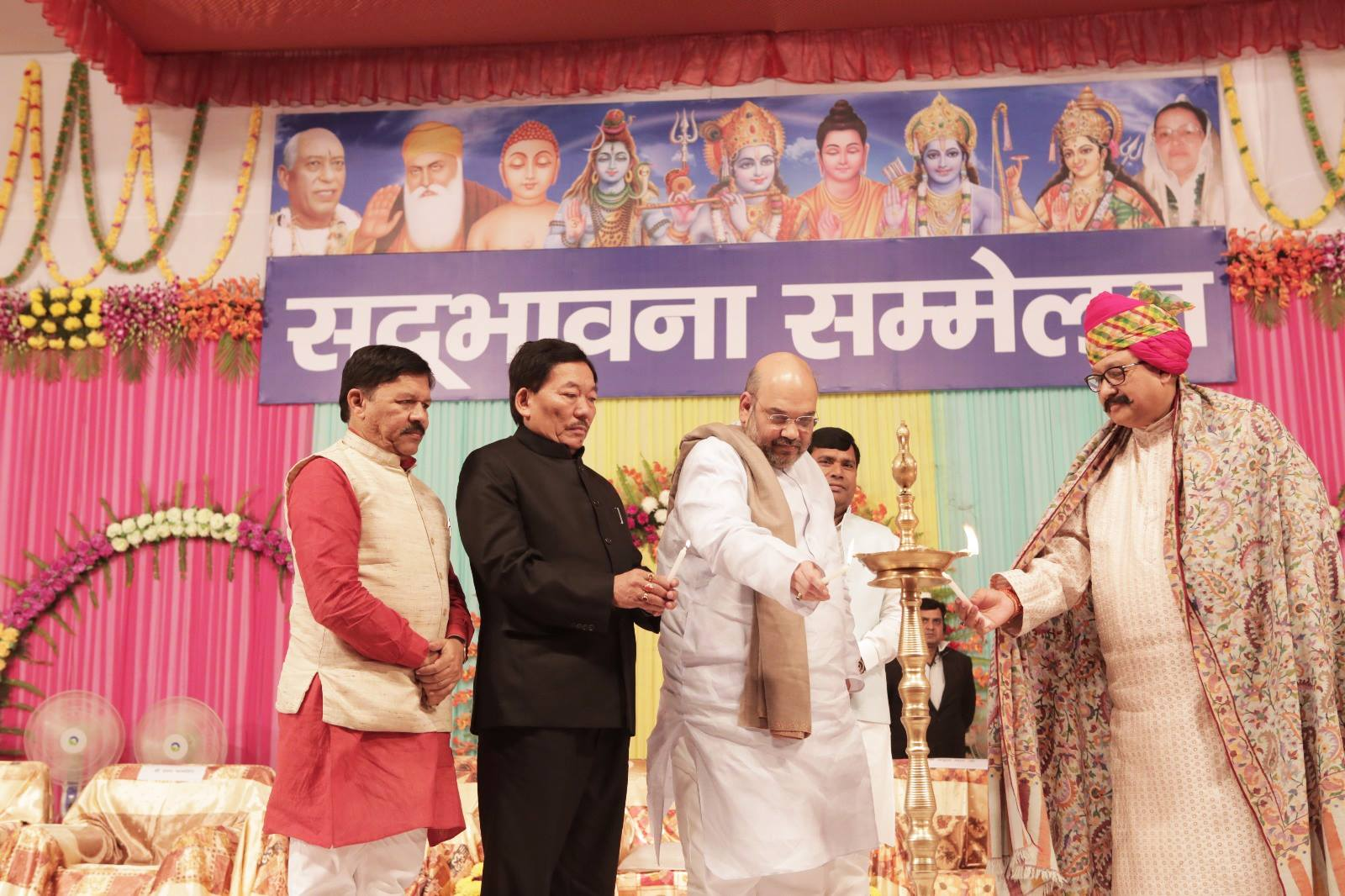
Shri Satpal Maharaj With Hon'ble Guests at Sadbhawna Sammelan

Sadbhawana Sammelan, is a spiritual gathering which is held every year under the leadership of Shri Satpal Ji Maharaj and organized by Manav Utthan Sewa Samiti.

India is crowned by the world’s highest peaks which seem to be saying, ‘Make yourselves lofty like us! Knock down the walls of hatred and nurture noble thoughts in your minds!’ says spiritual master Satpal Maharaj cabinet minister and Ex-Chairman of Parliamentary standing committee on defence. Throughout history, famous explorers and travellers journeyed to India from China, Japan, Tibet, Indonesia and Europe, because India has always been known as the land of spirituality. India’s saints and sages developed a universal spiritual path which can guide the entire human race. India has always exalted the ideal of non-violence. Mahatma Gandhi said, "Real education is the evolution of the spirit", but nowadays we are making zero spiritual progress. Our spiritual heritage teaches us to help one another, to love our fellow man. Whatever you share with others comes back to you multiplied.

While stressing on the spiritual vision for mankind he said Even though India is the land where Divine Masters lived and taught, nowadays the poison of untouchability, prejudice is eating away at society like a cancer. Despite all the laws and legal structures which have been created, man still hates man. Why? Doesn’t he realise the God also dwells in the lowly and the downtrodden? We feel like this because we have lost our spiritual vision. He said We have forgotten the Knowledge which turned a prince Siddhartha into a Buddha. We have lost contact with the experience which changed people into saints and sages. We pay homage to the divine experience that Siddhartha had, due to which he is worshipped around the world. If we have the same experience, our lives will also be transformed. Society and the times can only be changes when we ourselves change. When we change, society will also change and our children will inherit a Golden Age."

== Social initiatives ==
MUSS is a very 'grassroots' organization. All spiritual and social welfare activities of each district centre around the local ashram. Mahatmas (both male and female) live in these ashrams. They conduct weekly public satsang, usually on Sunday afternoons, in the ashram and also hold programs in private homes and other local venues. These programs aim to promote peace, harmony and goodwill among the diverse sections of Indian society.

Besides its primary objective of spreading spiritual Knowledge, the Society has the following ongoing programs:

- It mobilises medical and relief teams to provide immediate assistance in times of natural disasters such as the earthquakes in Garhwal and Gujarat, the plague in Surat and the cyclones in Gujarat and Orissa
- It provides free and clean drinking water facilities in many towns and villages.
- It runs schools and colleges charging only nominal tuition fees.
- Mahatmas (instructors) from M.U.S.S. hold satsang meetings in prisons. These meetings have helped many inmates rethink their lives and goals and this facilitates their rehabilitation and reintegration into society.
- Dharmshalas (pilgrim accommodation) have been opened at various places of pilgrimage such as Badrinath and Kalimath in the Himalayas. One such dharmshala is situated near the public hospital in Srikot, Garhwal, where relatives of patients can stay free of charge.
- It maintains clinics at many of its ashrams. These offer a variety of treatments. The Delhi Ashram in Punjabi Bagh has a large and well-stocked homeopathic clinic. A small hospital at Satlok Ashram, Muradnagar, offers both homeopathic and Western medical treatment. From time to time, either in conjunction with satsang programs, festivals or at times of natural disasters, medical teams provide free treatment to local people.
- Shri Hans Ayurved Bhavan, at Prem Nagar Ashram Hardwar, manufactures the full range of ayurvedic medicines. In conjunction with the Indian Government, it operated a three-year comprehensive "Village Project" to reacquaint villagers with their traditional low-cost, freely available, safe and environmentally sound methods of healing. Its team of qualified physicians also operates a research centre and a farm to preserve and cultivate medicinal plants.
- Eye camps are held from time to time across the country to offer free eye checking and treatment to the poor.
- M.U.S.S. promotes various services such as blood donation camps. It runs cleanliness drives in hospitals and streets as well as anti-drugs and anti-alcohol campaigns.

=== Blood donation camps ===
Manav Utthan Sewa Samiti organizes blood donation camps across the various ashrams in India every year. Many participants take part in it with full zeal and vigor. Such camps help in replenish the blood of all blood groups in the blood camps, as many people die due its unavailability. Such a camp was recently held at an Ashram in Punjabi Bagh, Delhi, where 250 Units of blood were collected in association with Lions Club and Guru Teg Bahadur Hospital. In the recent held camp, Satpal Maharaj (under whose guidance the camp held) said, blood donation is the true service of humanity (translated from a Hindi version).

=== Other activities ===
==== Facilitation programs ====
Manav Utthan Sewa Samiti organizes many facilitation programs for eradication of the social evils and upliftment of the weaker sections of the society, in one such program organized at Haryana, the Chief Minister, said the spiritual leaders like Shri Ramdev and Shri Satpal Maharaj and some Industrialist have agreed to adopt villages of the state under Sansad Adarsh Gram Yojana.
