= Haridwar Assembly constituency =

Constituency of the Uttarakhand legislative assembly in India

Coordinates: 29.94°N 78.10°E

Haridwar
- Constituency No. 25 for the Uttarakhand Legislative Assembly

Constituency details
- Country: India
- Region: North India
- State: Uttarakhand
- District: Haridwar
- Lok Sabha constituency: Haridwar
- Total electors: 149,108 (2022)
- Reservation: None

Member of Legislative Assembly
- 5th Uttarakhand Legislative Assembly
- Incumbent Madan Kaushik
- Party: Bharatiya Janata Party
- Elected year: 2022

Haridwar Legislative Assembly constituency is one of the seventy electoral Uttarakhand Legislative Assembly constituencies of Uttarakhand state in India. It includes Haridwar City area.

Haridwar Legislative Assembly constituency is a part of Haridwar (Lok Sabha constituency). The constituency is also a part of Haridwar Municipal Corporation, where it covers the first 35 wards.

== Members of Legislative Assembly ==
Election	Name	Party
1957	Shanti Prapanna Sharma	Indian National Congress
1962	Shanti Prapanna Sharma	Indian National Congress
1967	Ghanshyam Giri	Independent
1969	Shanti Prapanna Sharma	Indian National Congress
1974	Rajendra Kumar Garg	Communist Party of India
1977	Raj Kumar Sharma	Janata Party
1980	Ram Yash Singh	Indian National Congress
1985	Mahavir Singh Rana	Indian National Congress
1989	Virendra Jain	Janata Dal
1991	Jagdish Muni	Bharatiya Janata Party
1993	Jagdish Muni	Bharatiya Janata Party
1996	Ambrish Kumar	Samajwadi Party
Major boundary changes
2002	Madan Kaushik	Bharatiya Janata Party
2007	Madan Kaushik	Bharatiya Janata Party
Major boundary changes
2012	Madan Kaushik	Bharatiya Janata Party
2017	Madan Kaushik	Bharatiya Janata Party
2022	Madan Kaushik	Bharatiya Janata Party

== Election results ==
=== 2027 Assembly election ===
2027 Uttarakhand Legislative Assembly election: Haridwar
Party	Candidate	Votes	%	±%
INC				
BJP				
NOTA	None of the above			
Majority				
Turnout				
gain from		Swing		

=== Assembly Election 2022 ===
2022 Uttarakhand Legislative Assembly election: Haridwar
Party	Candidate	Votes	%	±%
BJP	Madan Kaushik	53,147	55.45%	▼10.45
INC	Satpal Brahamchari	37,910	39.56%	▲12.00
BSP	Charan Singh	2,142	2.23%	
AAP	Sanjay Saini	1,248	1.30%	New
NOTA	None of the above	548	0.57%	▼0.10
Margin of victory		15,237	15.90%	▼22.45
Turnout		95,840	64.23%	▼1.05
Registered electors		1,49,219		▲3.97
BJP hold		Swing	▼10.45	

=== Assembly Election 2017 ===
2017 Uttarakhand Legislative Assembly election: Haridwar
Party	Candidate	Votes	%	±%
BJP	Madan Kaushik	61,742	65.91%	▲14.65
INC	Brahmswroop Brahmchari	25,815	27.56%	▼13.25
BSP	Anju Mittal	2,661	2.84%	▼1.07
Independent	Ravish Bhatija	1,571	1.68%	New
NOTA	None of the above	632	0.67%	New
Margin of victory		35,927	38.35%	▲27.90
Turnout		93,681	65.27%	▼2.55
Registered electors		1,43,519		▲17.96
BJP hold		Swing	▲14.65	

=== Assembly Election 2012 ===
2012 Uttarakhand Legislative Assembly election: Haridwar
Party	Candidate	Votes	%	±%
BJP	Madan Kaushik	42,297	51.26%	▲1.41
INC	Satpal Brahamchari	33,677	40.81%	▲24.79
BSP	Gulshan Arora	3,225	3.91%	▼1.03
Independent	Ashok Sharma	748	0.91%	New
Margin of victory		8,620	10.45%	▼21.21
Turnout		82,519	67.82%	▲6.55
Registered electors		1,21,669		▼17.59
BJP hold		Swing	▲1.41	

=== Assembly Election 2007 ===
2007 Uttarakhand Legislative Assembly election: Haridwar
Party	Candidate	Votes	%	±%
BJP	Madan Kaushik	45,093	49.85%	▲18.59
SP	Ambrish Kumar	16,453	18.19%	▲2.13
INC	Purushottam Sharma	14,490	16.02%	▼10.31
Independent	Zeenat	6,275	6.94%	New
BSP	Krishna Murari Sharma	4,465	4.94%	▼16.48
UKD	Jamshed Khan	978	1.08%	▼0.07
Margin of victory		28,640	31.66%	▲26.73
Turnout		90,459	61.33%	▲12.85
Registered electors		1,47,631		▲17.85
BJP hold		Swing	▲18.59	

=== Assembly Election 2002 ===
2002 Uttaranchal Legislative Assembly election: Haridwar
Party	Candidate	Votes	%	±%
BJP	Madan Kaushik	18,962	31.26%	New
INC	Paras Kumar Jain	15,970	26.33%	New
BSP	Vikas Chaudhary	12,991	21.42%	New
SP	Ambrish Kumar	9,744	16.06%	New
Independent	Sumer	724	1.19%	New
UKD	Satish Joshi	697	1.15%	New
Margin of victory		2,992	4.93%	
Turnout		60,663	48.43%	
Registered electors		1,25,270		
BJP win (new seat)				
