= Narendranagar Assembly constituency =

Legislative Assembly constituency in Uttarakhand state, India

Coordinates: 30.16°N 78.29°E

Narendranagar
- Constituency No. 11 for the Uttarakhand Legislative Assembly

Constituency details
- Country: India
- Region: North India
- State: Uttarakhand
- District: Tehri Garhwal
- Lok Sabha constituency: Garhwal
- Reservation: None

Member of Legislative Assembly
- 5th Uttarakhand Legislative Assembly
- Incumbent Subodh Uniyal
- Party: Bharatiya Janata Party
- Elected year: 2022

Narendranagar Legislative Assembly Constituency is one of the 70 assembly constituencies of Uttarakhand a northern state of India. Narendranagar is part of Garhwal Lok Sabha constituency.

== Members of the Legislative Assembly ==
| Election | Member | Party |
|---|---|---|
| 2002 | Subodh Uniyal | Indian National Congress |
| 2007 | Om Gopal Rawat | Uttarakhand Kranti Dal |
| 2012 | Subodh Uniyal | Indian National Congress |
| 2017 | Subodh Uniyal | Bharatiya Janata Party |
| 2022 | Subodh Uniyal | Bharatiya Janata Party |

== Election results ==
=== 2027 Assembly election ===
2027 Uttarakhand Legislative Assembly election: Narendranagar
| Party | Candidate | Votes | % | ±% |
|---|---|---|---|---|
| INC | | | | |
| BJP | | | | |
| NOTA | None of the above | | | |
| Majority | | | | |
| Turnout | | | | |
| gain from | | Swing | | |

=== Assembly Election 2022 ===
2022 Uttarakhand Legislative Assembly election: Narendranagar
| Party | Candidate | Votes | % | ±% |
|---|---|---|---|---|
| BJP | Subodh Uniyal | 27,430 | 47.83% | ▲1.97 |
| INC | Om Gopal Rawat | 25,632 | 44.70% | ▲36.46 |
| UKD | Sardar Singh Pundir | 2,187 | 3.81% | ▼2.49 |
| AAP | Pushpa Rawat | 698 | 1.22% | New |
| NOTA | None of the above | 589 | 1.03% | ▼0.04 |
| CPI | Jagdish Kuliyal | 461 | 0.80% | ▼0.01 |
| Uttarakhand Janata Party | Ranbeer Singh Aswal | 350 | 0.61% | New |
| Margin of victory | | 1,798 | 3.14% | ▼6.32 |
| Turnout | | 57,347 | 61.99% | ▼0.25 |
| Registered electors | | 92,505 | | ▲9.55 |
| BJP hold | | Swing | ▲1.97 | |

=== Assembly Election 2017 ===
2017 Uttarakhand Legislative Assembly election: Narendranagar
| Party | Candidate | Votes | % | ±% |
|---|---|---|---|---|
| BJP | Subodh Uniyal | 24,104 | 45.86% | ▲3.37 |
| Independent | Om Gopal Rawat | 19,132 | 36.40% | New |
| INC | Himanshu Bijalwan | 4,328 | 8.23% | ▼35.07 |
| UKD | Sardar Singh | 3,314 | 6.30% | ▲5.13 |
| NOTA | None of the above | 563 | 1.07% | New |
| CPI | Jagdish Kuliyal | 427 | 0.81% | New |
| BSP | Hakim Singh | 417 | 0.79% | ▼0.40 |
| Margin of victory | | 4,972 | 9.46% | ▲8.64 |
| Turnout | | 52,562 | 62.25% | ▼2.66 |
| Registered electors | | 84,441 | | ▲11.83 |
| BJP gain from INC | | Swing | ▲2.56 | |

=== Assembly Election 2012 ===
2012 Uttarakhand Legislative Assembly election: Narendranagar
| Party | Candidate | Votes | % | ±% |
|---|---|---|---|---|
| INC | Subodh Uniyal | 21,220 | 43.30% | ▲14.40 |
| BJP | Om Gopal Rawat | 20,819 | 42.48% | ▲17.62 |
| Independent | Sardar Singh | 3,445 | 7.03% | New |
| Independent | Aditya Kothari | 1,600 | 3.26% | New |
| BSP | Rukam Singh Pokhriyal | 584 | 1.19% | ▼0.98 |
| UKD | Sanjay Kothiyal | 575 | 1.17% | ▼27.73 |
| URM | Soban Singh Negi | 573 | 1.17% | New |
| Margin of victory | | 401 | 0.82% | ▲0.81 |
| Turnout | | 49,005 | 64.90% | ▲2.39 |
| Registered electors | | 75,506 | | |
| INC gain from UKD | | Swing | ▲14.39 | |

=== Assembly Election 2007 ===
2007 Uttarakhand Legislative Assembly election: Narendranagar
| Party | Candidate | Votes | % | ±% |
|---|---|---|---|---|
| UKD | Om Gopal Rawat | 13,729 | 28.91% | ▲21.47 |
| INC | Subodh Uniyal | 13,725 | 28.90% | ▲0.06 |
| BJP | Lakhiram Joshi | 11,808 | 24.86% | ▲0.53 |
| Independent | Sardar Singh | 3,660 | 7.71% | New |
| BJSH | Madan Singh | 1,775 | 3.74% | New |
| BSP | Jai Prakash | 1,033 | 2.18% | ▲0.56 |
| RLD | Prema Upreti | 572 | 1.20% | New |
| Vishwa Vikas Sangh | Ram Sharan Bhatt | 477 | 1.00% | New |
| SP | Mahabeer Singh | 367 | 0.77% | ▼3.69 |
| NCP | Bachan Singh Dhanola | 347 | 0.73% | New |
| Margin of victory | | 4 | 0.01% | ▼4.50 |
| Turnout | | 47,493 | 62.63% | ▲14.89 |
| Registered electors | | 75,978 | | |
| UKD gain from INC | | Swing | ▲0.07 | |

=== Assembly Election 2002 ===
2002 Uttaranchal Legislative Assembly election: Narendranagar
| Party | Candidate | Votes | % | ±% |
|---|---|---|---|---|
| INC | Subodh Uniyal | 9,798 | 28.84% | New |
| BJP | Lakhiram Joshi | 8,267 | 24.34% | New |
| Independent | Surendra Singh | 3,930 | 11.57% | New |
| UKD | Om Gopal Rawat | 2,525 | 7.43% | New |
| Independent | Sardar Singh | 1,691 | 4.98% | New |
| Independent | Bhagwan Singh | 1,653 | 4.87% | New |
| SP | Sab Singh | 1,516 | 4.46% | New |
| Shivsena | Jeet Ram Bhatt | 856 | 2.52% | New |
| Uttarakhand Janwadi Party | Gajendra Singh | 849 | 2.50% | New |
| CPI | Jagdish Prasad | 609 | 1.79% | New |
| BSP | Anil Kumar | 550 | 1.62% | New |
| Margin of victory | | 1,531 | 4.51% | |
| Turnout | | 33,971 | 47.66% | |
| Registered electors | | 71,334 | | |
| INC win (new seat) | | | | |

== See also ==
- List of constituencies of the Uttarakhand Legislative Assembly
- Tehri Garhwal district
