= Ghansali Assembly constituency =

Constituency of the Uttarakhand legislative assembly in India

Coordinates: 30.43°N 78.66°E

Ghansali
- Constituency No. 9 for the Uttarakhand Legislative Assembly

Constituency details
- Country: India
- Region: North India
- State: Uttarakhand
- District: Tehri Garhwal
- Lok Sabha constituency: Tehri Garhwal
- Total electors: 98,409
- Reservation: SC

Member of Legislative Assembly
- 5th Uttarakhand Legislative Assembly
- Incumbent Shakti Lal Shah
- Party: BJP
- Elected year: 2022

Ghansali Legislative Assembly constituency is one of the 70 assembly constituencies of Uttarakhand a northern state of India. Ghansali is part of Tehri Garhwal Lok Sabha constituency.

== Members of the Legislative Assembly ==
Election	Member	Party
2002	Balbeer Singh Negi	Nationalist Congress Party
2007	Balbeer Singh Negi	Indian National Congress
2012	Bhim Lal Arya	Bharatiya Janata Party
2017	Shakti Lal Shah	Bharatiya Janata Party
2022	Shakti Lal Shah	Bharatiya Janata Party

== Election results ==
=== 2027 Assembly election ===
2027 Uttarakhand Legislative Assembly election: Ghansali
Party	Candidate	Votes	%	±%
INC				
BJP				
NOTA	None of the above			
Majority				
Turnout				
gain from		Swing		

=== Assembly Election 2022 ===
2022 Uttarakhand Legislative Assembly election: Ghansali
Party	Candidate	Votes	%	±%
BJP	Shakti Lal Shah	20,949	42.09%	▼7.08
INC	Dhani Lal Shah	10,664	21.43%	▲10.39
Independent	Bhim Lal Arya	9,204	18.49%	New
Independent	Darshan Lal Das	4,739	9.52%	New
UKD	Kamal Das	1,653	3.32%	▲2.44
Independent	Shoorveer Lal	1,363	2.74%	New
NOTA	None of the above	742	1.49%	▼0.72
AAP	Vijay Prakash	454	0.91%	New
Margin of victory		10,285	20.67%	▼5.26
Turnout		49,768	50.18%	▲0.99
Registered electors		99,175		▲8.54
BJP hold		Swing	▼7.08	

=== Assembly Election 2017 ===
2017 Uttarakhand Legislative Assembly election: Ghansali
Party	Candidate	Votes	%	±%
BJP	Shakti Lal Shah	22,103	49.18%	▼9.35
Independent	Dhani Lal Shah	10,450	23.25%	New
INC	Bhim Lal Arya	4,963	11.04%	▼14.44
Independent	Prem Lal	3,062	6.81%	New
URM	Makan Lal	1,458	3.24%	▲1.29
NOTA	None of the above	995	2.21%	New
Independent	Kamal Das	715	1.59%	New
BSP	Pingal Dass	653	1.45%	▼2.05
UKD	Siman Lal Arya	395	0.88%	▼1.37
Margin of victory		11,653	25.93%	▼7.12
Turnout		44,945	49.19%	▼4.54
Registered electors		91,369		▲18.48
BJP hold		Swing	▼9.35	

=== Assembly Election 2012 ===
2012 Uttarakhand Legislative Assembly election: Ghansali
Party	Candidate	Votes	%	±%
BJP	Bhim Lal Arya	24,254	58.53%	▲40.60
INC	Dhani Lal Shah	10,560	25.48%	▼3.49
Independent	Shoorveer Lal	2,439	5.89%	New
BSP	Achla Khandewal	1,452	3.50%	▼0.94
UKD	Makan Lal	930	2.24%	▼7.94
URM	Nagendra Lal	808	1.95%	New
ABHM	Bhagwan Das	536	1.29%	New
NCP	Ramesh Naithwal	377	0.91%	▼24.88
Margin of victory		13,694	33.05%	▲29.86
Turnout		41,438	53.73%	▼1.91
Registered electors		77,119		▲0.07
BJP gain from INC		Swing	▲29.56	

=== Assembly Election 2007 ===
2007 Uttarakhand Legislative Assembly election: Ghansali
Party	Candidate	Votes	%	±%
INC	Balbeer Singh Negi	12,424	28.97%	▲11.79
NCP	Abbal Singh Bist	11,058	25.79%	▼0.13
BJP	Chandra Kishor Maithani	7,691	17.93%	▲4.41
UKD	Laxman Singh Rana	4,368	10.19%	▲2.49
Independent	Bhim Lal Arya	2,896	6.75%	New
BSP	Sohan Singh Kunwar	1,904	4.44%	New
LJP	Mahendra Lal	870	2.03%	New
Shivsena	Surya Prakash Semwal Shastri	857	2.00%	New
BJSH	Tej Ram Semwal	815	1.90%	New
Margin of victory		1,366	3.19%	▼5.55
Turnout		42,883	55.73%	▲3.35
Registered electors		77,063		▼5.66
INC gain from NCP		Swing	▲3.05	

=== Assembly Election 2002 ===
2002 Uttaranchal Legislative Assembly election: Ghansali
Party	Candidate	Votes	%	±%
NCP	Balbeer Singh Negi	11,072	25.92%	New
INC	Abbal Singh Bist	7,340	17.18%	New
BJP	Uttam Singh Kathaith	5,776	13.52%	New
Independent	Shri Ram	3,887	9.10%	New
UKD	Laxman Singh Rana	3,289	7.70%	New
Uttarakhand Janwadi Party	Ramanand Joshi	3,005	7.03%	New
Independent	Sohan Singh	2,711	6.35%	New
Independent	Surya Prakash Semwal Shastri	1,492	3.49%	New
SP	Susildev Surira	1,001	2.34%	New
Independent	Vinay Laxmi	778	1.82%	New
Independent	Prem Ram	730	1.71%	New
Margin of victory		3,732	8.74%	
Turnout		42,720	52.31%	
Registered electors		81,688		
NCP win (new seat)				

== See also ==
- Tehri Garhwal (Lok Sabha constituency)
