= Doon University =

University in Dehradun, Uttarakhand, India

- दून विश्वविद्यालय
- Motto: "ज्योतिर्वृणीत तमसो विजानन्"
- Type: State public university
- Established: 2005; 21 years ago
- Affiliations: UGC, MHRD
- Chancellor: Governor of Uttarakhand
- Vice-Chancellor: Surekha Dangwal
- Undergraduates: 400
- Postgraduates: 250
- Doctoral students: 80
- Location: Dehradun, Uttarakhand, India; 30°16′04″N 78°02′45″E
- Campus: Suburban
- Colours: Sky Blue
- Website: doonuniversity.ac.in/

Doon University (Hindi: दून विश्वविद्यालय) is a state public university located in Dehradun in the north Indian state of Uttarakhand.

== History ==
The university was founded by order of the Government of Uttarakhand in October 2005. Its first courses started in July 2009.

== Campus ==
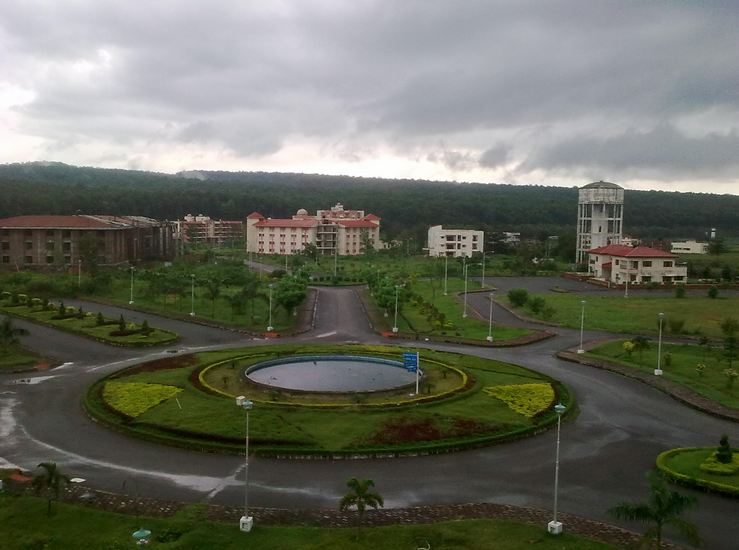
Doon University Campus

Doon University's campus is around eight kilometers from Dehradun, in the foothills of the Shivalik range and on the banks of the Rispana river. It started as a residential university, but has permitted day students since 2013. The university covers 52.35 acres and includes separate accommodation for male and female students.

== Organisation and administration ==
=== Governance ===
Doon University is a State University under the jurisdiction of the government of Uttarakhand. The Governor of the state is ex-officio Chancellor of the university and appoints the university's Vice Chancellor, its full-time chief executive. The Vice Chancellor chairs a Board of Management, which oversees financial and administrative matters and ratifies recommendations of other councils of the university.

=== Faculties ===
Doon University is a non-affiliating university and its academic activities are organized through its eight constituent schools, which run undergraduate, postgraduate and doctoral programs.

=== Dr.Nitya Nand Himalayan research and study centre ===
Dr Nityanand Himalayan Research and Study Centre (NHRSC) is named after the renowned Geographer Dr. Nitya Nand. He served the Department of Geography in D.B.S. Post Graduate College, Dehradun (Uttarakhand, India) from the year 1965 to 1985 as the Head of Department. He was a passionate teacher, researcher and a committed social worker. He published numerous research papers, articles and books on the natural and cultural aspects of the Himalaya. ‘The Holy Himalaya: A Geographical Interpretation of Garhwal Himalaya’ is his much-acclaimed work. His academic contribution is well documented at national and international levels. He travelled widely and conducted field studies for about two decades (1965–85) of the Indian Central Himalayan Region, popularly known as the ‘Uttarakhand Himalaya’, particularly during the period when the means of transportation were inadequate.

The centre is hosting M.A. (Geography), M.Sc. (Geology) & M.A. (Theatre) courses since the academic year 2019–2020. Further, the centre is starting graduation courses: B.A./B.Sc. (Geography) & B.Sc. (Geology) from the academic year 2023–2024 as per the guidelines of National Education Policy 2020 (https://www.education.gov.in/). For meaningful research towards sustainable development, natural hazards and disaster risk reduction in view of changing climate & seismic vulnerability, centre will start hosing Ph.D. in Geography & Geology from the academic year 2023–2024.The centre also offers certificate courses in Garhwali, Kumauni, and Jaunsari languages to increase the impact of rich heritage of regional languages of Uttarakhand. The school was established in 2019 to create a world class state of the art nodal centre for Himalayan studies. The Centre hosts the Departments of Geography and Geology and the main mission objective of the Centre is to study, document, and research all aspects of the Himalayas including but not limited to Himalayan topography, landform, glaciers, hydrology, climate change, demography, culture, society, economy etc.

==== School of Media and Communication (SOMC) ====
The school offers courses in mass communication including journalism, media studies, social and development communication, advertising, public relations, photography, radio, television, films, animation, graphic design, multimedia, media management and communication research. The school has a media production centre consisting of a TV studio and production facility. Its courses include contributions from media industry professionals.

==== School of Design ====
This school started in 2015 and allows specialization in graphic design or product design.

==== School of Environment and Natural Resources ====
The school offers postgraduate courses in environmental technology and natural resource management.

==== School of Languages ====
The school has courses in German, Chinese, Spanish, French, Japanese And English. It was established by the ethnographer, folklorist and post-colonial theorist Sadhana Naithani.

==== School of Management ====
The school of management offers undergraduate as well as postgraduate courses.

==== School of Physical Sciences ====
This school runs undergraduate courses in Physics, Chemistry, Mathematics and Computer Science.

==== School of Social Sciences ====
The school was established in 2010, and includes a Department of Economics.

== Facilities ==
=== Central Library ===
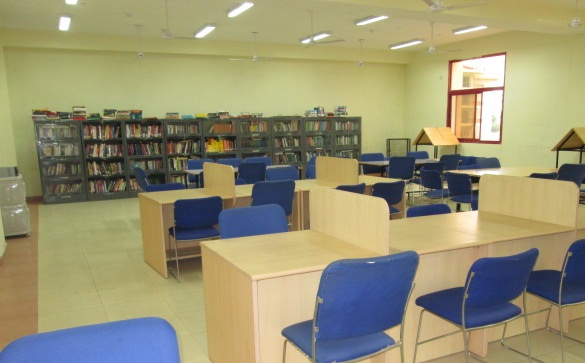
Library Reading section

The university Central Library opened in 2009, offering print and electronic learning materials both of its own and via the INFLIBNET consortium.

=== Sports ===
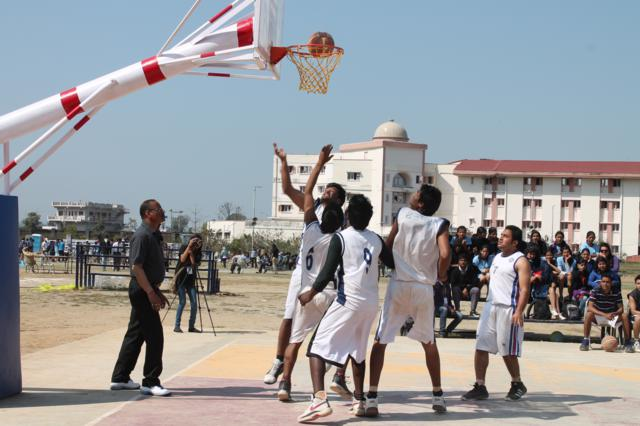
InterUniversity Youth Fest at Doon University

The university has facilities for cricket, football, badminton, basketball and table-tennis.
