= Lakhiram Joshi =

Indian politician

Lakhiram Joshi is an Indian politician and member of the Bharatiya Janata Party. Joshi was a member of the Uttarakhand Legislative Assembly from the Tehri constituency in Tehri Garhwal district.
