= Madan Kaushik =

Indian politician (born 1965)

Cabinet Minister to the Government of Uttarakhand
- Incumbent
- Assumed office 20 March 2026

State President, BJP Uttarakhand
- In office 12 March 2021 – 30 July 2022
- Preceded by: Banshidhar Bhagat
- Succeeded by: Mahendra Bhatt

Member of Uttarakhand Legislative Assembly
- Incumbent
- Assumed office 2002
- Constituency: Haridwar

Personal details
- Born: 11 January 1965 (age 61)
- Party: Bharatiya Janata Party

Madan Kaushik is an Indian politician from Bharatiya Janata Party. He is currently serving as a cabinet minister of Panchayati Raj, Disaster Management and Rehabilitation and Census in the Government of Uttarakhand under Pushkar Singh Dhami. He was the immediate past BJP's state president in Uttarakhand and serving his fifth term as MLA from Haridwar constituency. He is the former spokesperson for the Government of Uttarakhand. He is a member of the Legislative Assembly from Haridwar uttarakhand. He also served previously as the cabinet minister from 2017 to 2021 and also, from 2007 to 2012 in Bhartiya Janta Party government under the chief minister Trivendra Singh Rawat, Bhuvan Chandra Khanduri and Dr. Ramesh Pokhriyal Nishank. He was first elected as a member of the Legislative assembly in the year 2002 and subsequently in the year 2007, 2012, 2017 and 2022. In 2017, he won the elections with a margin of more than 37,000 votes, thereby getting the 68% of the total polled votes. He further won 2022 elections to serve his fifth term by winning with a margin of more than 15,000 votes.

== Electoral performance ==
Election	Constituency	Party	Result	Votes %	Opposition Candidate	Opposition Party	Opposition vote %
2022	Haridwar	BJP	Won	55.45%	Satpal Brahamchari	INC	39.56%
2017	Haridwar	BJP	Won	65.91%	Brahmswroop Brahmchari	INC	27.56%
2012	Haridwar	BJP	Won	51.26%	Satpal Brahamchari	INC	40.81%
2007	Haridwar	BJP	Won	49.85%	Ambrish Kumar	INC	18.17%
2002	Haridwar	BJP	Won	31.26%	Paras Kumar Jain	INC	26.33%
