= Tehri Assembly constituency =

Constituency of the Uttarakhand legislative assembly in India

Coordinates: 30.38°N 78.44°E

Tehri
- Constituency No. 13 for the Uttarakhand Legislative Assembly

Constituency details
- Country: India
- Region: North India
- State: Uttarakhand
- District: Tehri Garhwal
- Lok Sabha constituency: Tehri Garhwal
- Total electors: 84,207
- Reservation: None

Member of Legislative Assembly
- 5th Uttarakhand Legislative Assembly
- Incumbent Kishore Upadhyay
- Party: Bharatiya Janata Party
- Elected year: 2022

13-Tehri Legislative Assembly constituency is one of the seventy electoral Uttarakhand Legislative Assembly constituencies of Uttarakhand state in India.

Tehri Legislative Assembly constituency is a part of Tehri Garhwal (Lok Sabha constituency).

== Members of Legislative Assembly ==
Election	Name	Portrait	Party
1952	Maharaj Kumar Balendu Shah		Independent politician
1957	Trepan Singh Negi		Indian National Congress
1962	Trepan Singh Negi		Indian National Congress
1967	Trepan Singh Negi		Indian National Congress
1969	Govind Singh Negi		Communist Party of India
1974	Govind Singh Negi		Communist Party of India
1977	Govind Singh Negi		Communist Party of India
1980	Khushal Singh Rangar		Indian National Congress
1985	Lokendra Dutt Saklani		Indian National Congress
1989	Balvir Singh Negi		Janata Dal
1991	Lakhiram Joshi		Bharatiya Janata Party
1993	Shoorveer Singh Sajwan		Indian National Congress
1996	Lakhiram Joshi		Bharatiya Janata Party
Major boundary changes
2002	Kishore Upadhyaya		Indian National Congress
2007	Kishore Upadhyaya		Indian National Congress
Major boundary changes
2012	Dinesh Dhanai		Independent
2017	Dhan Singh Negi		Bharatiya Janata Party
2022	Kishore Upadhyaya		Bharatiya Janata Party

== Election results ==
=== 2027 Assembly election ===
2027 Uttarakhand Legislative Assembly election: Tehri
Party	Candidate	Votes	%	±%
INC				
BJP				
NOTA	None of the above			
Majority				
Turnout				
gain from		Swing		

=== Assembly Election 2022 ===
2022 Uttarakhand Legislative Assembly election: Tehri
Party	Candidate	Votes	%	±%
BJP	Kishore Upadhyaya	19,802	42.31%	▼4.77
Uttarakhand Janekta Party	Dinesh Dhanai	18,851	40.28%	New
INC	Dhan Singh Negi	6,385	13.64%	▲3.58
AAP	Trilok Singh Negi	742	1.59%	New
NOTA	None of the above	415	0.89%	▼0.19
UKD	Urmila	252	0.54%	▼0.60
Margin of victory		951	2.03%	▼13.38
Turnout		46,801	54.93%	▲0.24
Registered electors		85,206		▲4.98
BJP hold		Swing	▼4.77	

=== Assembly Election 2017 ===
2017 Uttarakhand Legislative Assembly election: Tehri
Party	Candidate	Votes	%	±%
BJP	Dhan Singh Negi	20,896	47.08%	▲22.86
Independent	Dinesh Dhanai	14,056	31.67%	New
INC	Narendra Chand Ramola	4,466	10.06%	▼18.64
Hamari Janmanch Party	Sushil Chandra Bahuguna	1,067	2.40%	New
Independent	Sanjay Kumar Maithani	984	2.22%	New
Independent	Trilok Singh Negi	722	1.63%	New
Independent	Gopal Dutt Chamoli	585	1.32%	New
UKD	Budhi Singh Pundir	507	1.14%	▼4.37
NOTA	None of the above	476	1.07%	New
CPI(M)	Bhagwan Singh Rana	285	0.64%	▼0.12
Margin of victory		6,840	15.41%	▲14.48
Turnout		44,386	54.68%	▼1.70
Registered electors		81,167		▲12.76
BJP gain from Independent		Swing	▲17.45	

=== Assembly Election 2012 ===
2012 Uttarakhand Legislative Assembly election: Tehri
Party	Candidate	Votes	%	±%
Independent	Dinesh Dhanai	12,026	29.63%	New
INC	Kishore Upadhyaya	11,649	28.70%	▼6.61
BJP	Dhan Singh Negi	9,828	24.22%	▼3.93
UKD	Virendar Mohan	2,237	5.51%	▲2.05
URM	Er. Ratan Singh Gunsola	1,978	4.87%	New
BSP	Dr. Pramod Uniyal	914	2.25%	▲1.52
Independent	Sundar Lal Bailwal	593	1.46%	New
Independent	Shivdayal Bahuguna	559	1.38%	New
CPI(M)	Bhagwan Singh Rana	308	0.76%	▼0.62
Independent	Asha	307	0.76%	New
Margin of victory		377	0.93%	▼6.24
Turnout		40,586	56.38%	▼1.67
Registered electors		71,981		
Independent gain from INC		Swing	▼5.68	

=== Assembly Election 2007 ===
2007 Uttarakhand Legislative Assembly election: Tehri
Party	Candidate	Votes	%	±%
INC	Kishore Upadhyaya	15,755	35.31%	▼6.64
BJP	Khem Singh Chauhan	12,557	28.14%	▼3.27
Independent	Dinesh Dhanai	9,908	22.21%	New
Independent	Virendra Mohan	2,201	4.93%	New
UKD	Mahaveer Singh	1,543	3.46%	New
SP	Anil Kumar	782	1.75%	▲0.22
CPI(M)	Bhagwan Singh Rana	615	1.38%	New
LJP	Keshav	535	1.20%	New
BJSH	Kushla Semwal	394	0.88%	New
BSP	Satye Singh Rana	327	0.73%	▼1.55
Margin of victory		3,198	7.17%	▼3.37
Turnout		44,617	58.07%	▲14.89
Registered electors		76,851		
INC hold		Swing	▼6.64	

=== Assembly Election 2002 ===
2002 Uttaranchal Legislative Assembly election: Tehri
Party	Candidate	Votes	%	±%
INC	Kishore Upadhyaya	15,640	41.95%	New
BJP	Er. Ratan Singh Gunsola	11,712	31.41%	New
SAP	Virendra Singh Negi	2,092	5.61%	New
Independent	Anil Badoni	1,459	3.91%	New
Uttarakhand Janwadi Party	Tilak Ram	1,196	3.21%	New
Independent	Rita Rawat	1,151	3.09%	New
CPI	Ragunath Singh Rana	1,129	3.03%	New
BSP	Dr. Pramod Uniyal	850	2.28%	New
SP	Bhagwati Prasad	572	1.53%	New
Independent	Autar Singh Rana	560	1.50%	New
Independent	Kundan Singh Bist	266	0.71%	New
Margin of victory		3,928	10.54%	
Turnout		37,282	43.25%	
Registered electors		86,364		
INC win (new seat)				

== See also ==
- Tehri
- Tehri Garhwal district
