= Satpal Maharaj =

Indian politician

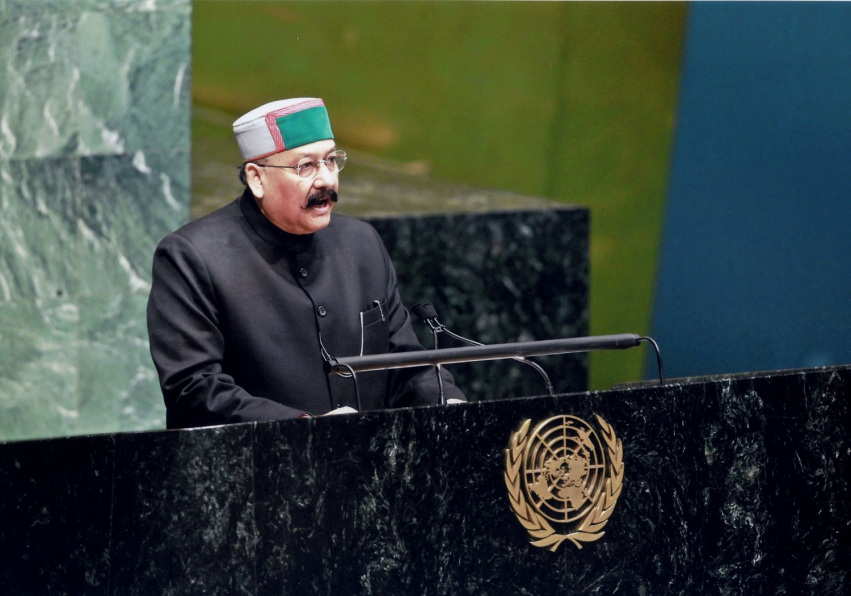

Cabinet Minister, Government of Uttarakhand
- Incumbent
- Assumed office 18 March 2017

Member of the Uttarakhand Legislative Assembly
- Incumbent
- Assumed office 11 March 2017
- Preceded by: Tirath Singh Rawat
- Constituency: Chaubattakhal

Personal details
- Born: 21 September 1951 (age 75) Kankhal, Uttar Pradesh, India (now Uttarakhand, India)
- Party: Bharatiya Janata Party
- Spouse: Amrita Rawat
- Children: Shraddhey, Suyesh
- Parents: Hans Maharaj (father); Rajeshwari Devi (mother)
- Relatives: Prem Rawat (brother); Rajaji Rawat (brother); Navi Rawat (niece)
- Website: www.satpalmaharaj.in

Satpal Maharaj (born Satpal Singh Rawat, 21 September 1951) is an Indian spiritual guru turned politician. He is a national executive member of the BJP. Currently, he serves as the tourism, cultural, and irrigation minister in the cabinet of the Government of Uttarakhand. He is the founder of Manav Utthan Sewa Samiti.

== Early life ==
=== Childhood ===
Satpal was born as the eldest son of Hans Maharaj, a spiritual guru, and his second wife, Rajeshwari Devi, in a small town named Kankhal in Haridwar district. Since childhood, he has had an interest in spirituality and often practices deep meditation techniques. His brothers, Bhole Rawat and Prem Rawat are also spiritual gurus.

Satpal went to St. George's College, Mussorie for formal education.

=== Spiritual Master ===
His father died in 1966, giving him the task of communicating spiritual knowledge to the world. He used to address a large crowd of followers with his spiritual discourses at very young ages. His message is "God is neither Hindu, Muslim, nor Christian. God is one and is our father".

=== Recognition as a Social Figure ===
Since the early years of his life, he has been a social activist, bringing about reforms. He has opened multiple non-profit clinics and brought other important services to the people of remote areas, who do not have access to government programs due to their geographical conditions. In his teenage years, he became familiar with the problems faced by people living in mountainous, remote areas of then-Uttar Pradesh, and he out-reached people living in such areas and supported their demand for a separate state of Uttarakhand. He set up a socio-spiritual society with the objective of uplifting mankind from the morass of ignorance and superstition. The society is called "Manav Utthan Sewa Samiti", with its headquarters in Delhi, India.

== Socio-Spiritual Initiatives ==
He established a socio-spiritual organization called Manav Utthan Sewa Samiti.

=== Manav Utthan Sewa Samiti ===
He founded Manav Utthan Sewa Samiti with the motive of preaching the meditation techniques called "Knowledge". The Society stands for sanskritizing the lower classes in the society and sharing with them the joys and sorrows of life as brethren by providing them with spiritual succor. It fights for their rights and against atrocities on the lower castes and condemns depriving their entry into the place of worship. Community lunch and commune living is a common feature of society.

=== Padyatras (Foot Marches) ===
He headed many padayatras, both nationally and internationally, many social causes, and to bring awareness and peace. He is connected to the motive of building a better, healthy, and contented society and has made many efforts to this end, as listed below:

Name of March	Date Started	Date Ended	Place From	Place To	Distance Covered (Approx. in km.)	Description
Bharat Jago Padyatra (Wake Up India Foot March)	24 September 1983	28 October 1983	Badrinath, Uttarakhand	Boat Club, Delhi	710 km.	This foot march traversed from the often dangerous mountainous terrain and walked through 500 villages, Maharaj Ji met more than 300,000 people along the way, talking with them and listening to their grievances. The poor and needy were given medicines and blankets. At each of the 24 stops along the way, evening programs were held to discuss the problems of the local people and to inform them of the aims of the padayatra. The march culminated with a gathering of 60,000, calling for social and political awakening. A campaign to clean up the polluted Ganges also began during this march.
Jan Jagran Padyatra (Awaken The People Foot March)	11 March 1985	Date unknown	Gandhi Maidan, Siliguri, West Bengal	Gangtok, Sikkim	250 km.	The aim of this foot march was to inspire youth to create a congenial atmosphere for the development of the hilly region and demand the Government to recognize and alleviate the endemic problems of the hill areas and to listen to the grievances of the local people, who felt ignored and neglected by the authorities. It also supported and re-ignited the long-standing demand for recognition of the Nepali language, which was ultimately successful with its inclusion in the 8th Schedule of the Constitution of India.
Janata Jage Padyatra (People Awake Foot March)	Somewhere in February 1986	somewhere in 1986	Bodh Gaya, Bihar	Patna, Bihar	230 km.	The foot march was held in the poverty-stricken and violence-ridden state of Bihar, it called upon the people to reawaken the humanitarian ideals of peace and harmony embodied in the teachings of Buddha and Mahavir Swami and promote caste and communal harmony. Satpal Maharaj said, "The best way to pay tribute to Lord Buddha is to follow his teachings and refrain from doing anything to the contrary. Nothing is achieved through violence and crime. Society can only be changed when we change ourselves." The aim of this padayatra was to help the masses, especially young people, realize that a law-abiding atmosphere is essential for economic and social progress.
Gandhi Yatra (A Car Rally Dedicated to Non-Violence)	Somewhere in October 1993	somewhere in 1993	Maghar, Uttar Pradesh	Lucknow, Uttar Pradesh	600 km.	To rekindle interest in the teachings of Mahatma Gandhi and to promote harmony among religious communities, Shri Satpal Ji Maharaj led "Gandhi-Yatra". This was a 'car rally' in which 350 cars took part. It started where St Kabir was cremated and where a temple and mosque share a common wall. After rallies in many of the main cities of Uttar Pradesh, the yatra finished in Lucknow, where crowds surged into the streets to welcome the participants. A mammoth rally in the historic Begum Hazrat Mahal Park was preceded by a 4 km silent march.
Shrandhanjali Padyatra (Tribute Foot March)	Somewhere in 1995	somewhere in 1995	Gopeshwar, Uttarakhand	Muzzaffarnagar, Uttar Pradesh	350 km.	This march was dedicated to commemorating the martyrs who lost their lives while demonstrating peacefully for a separate state of Uttarakhand. This region has specific problems that the state of Uttar Pradesh seemed unable to address. Maharaj Ji actively supported the Uttarakhand Movement and felt that the ultimate way to honor the dead would be to secure this separate state. When he was Minister of State for Railways in the Devegowda Government, he got the chance to convince the Prime Minister to grant statehood, which was announced during Independence Day celebrations on 15 August 1996.
Sadbhawana Padyatra (Goodwill Foot March)	Somewhere in November 2002	Somewhere in December 2002	Dandi, Gujarat	Sabarmati, Gujarat	350 km.	The aim of this march was to promote healing and goodwill between Hindus and Muslims in riot-torn Gujarat after horrific violence, as well as to address the issue of divisive politics that was tearing the social fabric apart. Maharaj Ji voiced the opinion that Gandhi's home state should stand out as a beacon of economic progress and human development and that its social ethos and climate must be congenial for industry and investment to flourish. The procession stretched for 350 km and went for 22 days. It attracted people from different faiths who joined in with great enthusiasm.
Gandhi Rainbow Peace March	Somewhere in 2005	Somewhere in 2005	Pietermaritzburg, South Africa	Durban, South Africa	100 km.	The march started where Mahatma Gandhi was evicted from a train for daring to sit in a 'Whites only' carriage and ended at City Hall, Durban, with a civic reception from the Mayor. Shri Maharaj Ji presented the Deputy Mayor of Pietermaritzburg and assembled dignitaries with a bust of Gandhi as a young barrister, to be installed at the railway station.

=== Other Social Initiatives ===
Shri Satpal Maharaj Ji has undertaken many social initiatives by the means of the MUSS.

==== Mission Education ====
This initiative was taken under the guidance of his son, Shri Shradhey Maharaj Ji, where they developed a model to supply the recurring stationery to the underprivileged of the society, who drop school due to lack of stationery. Under this initiative, the aim is to create a value system amongst the students of well-to-do families to care for the underprivileged and donate the excess of their stuff. This initiative focused on collection of items from well-off institutions and create awareness, and then making kits of necessary involved, and distributing them in underprivileged schools, so, there is no money involved at all. This is being run at the international level. In May 2019, this initiative became the world's quickest and largest system to donate the stationery, achieving a Guinness World Record.

== Political career ==
Shri Satpal Maharaj is the current Cabinet Minister in the State of Government of Uttarakhand, serving as the Minister of Tourism, Irrigation, Culture.

=== Works in Uttarakhand ===
==== Role in the formation of Uttarakhand ====
He had played a vital role in the formation of Uttarakhand.

==== Rail Line Project ====
He inaugurated a survey to this project as a Union Minister, and Minister of Railways of State of Uttar Pradesh (Now, in Uttarakhand) in 1996. This project got budget allocation and other clearances from the government, it is said to be the longest tunnel rail project in the country, which will play a vital role in the security of the country, and livelihood of the people of Uttarakhand. The Rishikesh to Karnprayag Rail Line is proposed to serve a vital role in the country, for prompt movement of Army (as the geographical location of the line is near India-China Border), pilgrims and locals. The foundation stone for the project survey was laid down by UPA chairperson Sonia Gandhi, on 9 November 2011 at Rishikesh, this was a 125-kilometer railway line project. The survey of the project completed somewhere by the year 2013, however, the project was delayed by state ministers to provide necessary land to Rail Vikas Nigam Limited (RVNL) for the commencement of the project construction due to nonfinalization of land acquisition rules of Uttarakhand.

==== Private bill in 8th schedule ====
He brought a private member's bill to include Garhwali and Kumaoni language in the Eighth Schedule of the Constitution of India.

==== Protein Revolution ====
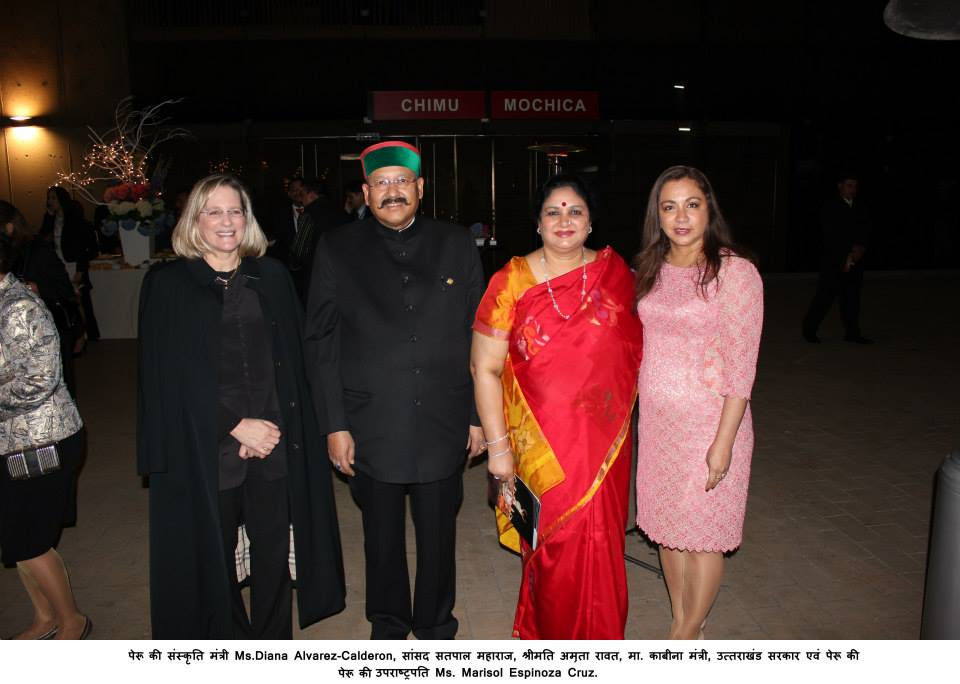
Maharaj with his wife and dignitaries of Peru.

Uttarakhand Government has inked a tourism promotion horticulture research agreement with Peru. State Government will have intergovernmental interaction of scientific communities from both the countries in order to boost horticulture and wool production in the State. According to Maharaj, the president of Peru will visit Uttarakhand in January to explore the possibilities and economic opportunities here. The MoU for tourism promotion was signed between the Uttarakhand tourism minister Amrita Rawat and Peru president Carlos Canales in the presence of the vice president of India Mohammed Hamid Ansari in their recent visit to Peru. As per agreement tourism officials and other related agencies of Peru will visit the State to study tourism activities and further possibilities of promotional chances here. Besides this Uttarakhand will also import seeds of Peru's native protein-rich high altitude cereal crop Quinoa to cultivate it here.

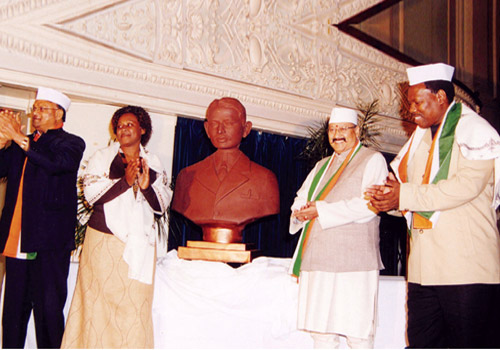
Satpal Maharaj Bust Donation at Africa.

== International activities ==
1. On 17 October 2011, he delivered a speech at 66th United Nations General Assembly session held in New York City on the topic "Sport for Peace and Development".

2. On 19 October 2011, he presented the statement by India in the First Committee Thematic Debate on Conventional Weapons at 66th United Nations General Assembly session held in New York City.

3. He and his wife Smt. Amrita Rawat jointly donated a bust of Mahatma Gandhi to KwaZulu-Natal provincial government, the bust was to be installed at the Pietermaritzburg Railway Station; the station where Mahatma Gandhi was thrown out of the train.

== COVID-19 disease ==
Satpal Maharaj, his wife, and his 22 family and staff members tested positive for Covid-19 on 30 May 2020. Satpal Maharaj and his wife had been admitted to AIIMS hospital, Rishikesh and the couple recovered from the coronavirus within 3 weeks; they were discharged from AIIMS hospital, Rishikesh on 17 June 2020.

== Bibliography ==
- Downton, James V. (1979). Sacred Journeys: The Conversion of Young Americans to Divine Light Mission. New York: Columbia University Press. ISBN 0-231-04198-5.
- Mangalwadi, Vishal (1992). The World of Gurus. Chicago, Ill.: Cornerstone. ISBN 978-0-940895-03-4.
- McKean, Lise (1996). Divine Enterprise: Gurus and the Hindu Nationalist Movement. University of Chicago Press. ISBN 0-226-56009-0.
- Moritz, Charles, ed. (1974). "Maharaj Ji, Guru". Current Biography Yearbook: 1974. H. W. Wilson Company. p. 254.
- Manav, Utthan; Sewa, Samiti (13 April 1979). LIFE PORTRAIT OF Shri SATPAL JI MAHARAJ. Punjabi Bagh, New Delhi: Vikram Printers.
