= Subodh Uniyal =

Indian politician

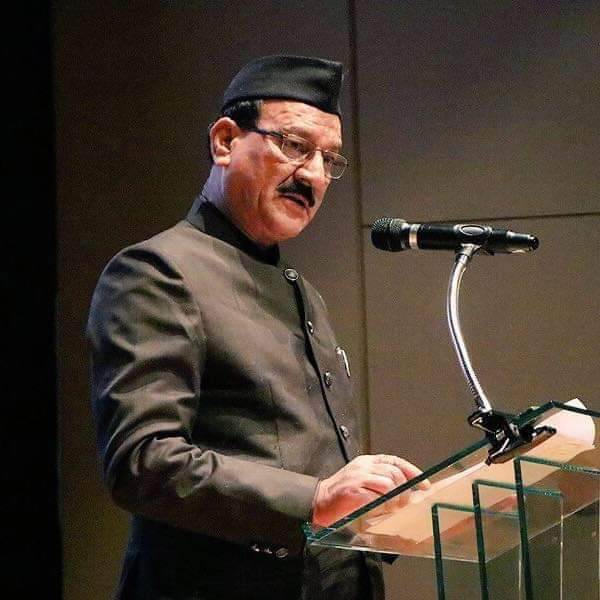

Cabinet Minister to the Government of Uttarakhand
- Incumbent
- Assumed office March 2017

Member of the Uttarakhand Legislative Assembly
- Incumbent
- Assumed office 8 March 2012
- Preceded by: Om Gopal Rawat
- Constituency: Narendranagar

Personal details
- Born: 26 July 1960 (age 66) Narendranagar, Uttarakhand, India
- Party: Bhartiya Janata Party
- Other political affiliations: Indian National Congress
- Spouse: Suman Uniyal (m. 1994)
- Children: 3
- Parent: Late. Dharmanand Uniyal (father)
- Education: Engineering
- Occupation: Politician

Subodh Uniyal (born 26 July 1960) is an Indian politician and member of the Bharatiya Janata Party, currently serving as the Parliamentary affairs and Forest Minister of Uttarakhand and president of the Uttarakhand State Football Association. He was elected as a member of the 2017 Uttarakhand Legislative Assembly and again in the 2022 Uttarakhand Legislative Assembly from the Narendra Nagar constituency in Tehri Garhwal district.

== Early life and education ==
Subodh Uniyal was born in the town of Narendra Nagar in Tehri Garhwal district in the Indian state of Uttarakhand, India. He holds a master's degree in political science from Allahabad University.

== Political career ==
Subodh Uniyal began his journey in Politics from Uttar Pradesh by becoming the coordinator of the Student Union in the Allahabad University. In 1981, he became the State General Secretary of the organization known as Youth for Democracy. Subodh Uniyal officially joined the Indian National Congress on 6 June 1989 and became the vice-president of the Youth Congress. In 1996, he was given his first ticket as a political candidate. However, his nomination was cancelled at the last moment due to no symbol being provided to him.

He contested his first election as part of the Indian National Congress in 2002 from the Narendra Nagar constituency and won the election by 1537 Votes. He was appointed the Principal advisor to then Chief Minister of Uttarakhand, Late Mr. Narayan Dutt Tiwari. In 2007, he contested the election from the same constituency and after being declared as the winner, he lost the election on recounting by 4 votes due to his postal ballots being deemed invalid. This didn't stop him from contesting the election again from this seat in 2012 and later on went to win the election by 401 votes. He was promised a ministry before Harish Rawat was made the CM of the state but was never given one. Later, disgruntled with Harish Rawat and his corrupt practices, he led the revolt against the Harish Government and along with 8 other MLAs decided to defect to the Bharatiya Janata Party's side which led to the imposition of President's rule in the state of Uttarakhand. He was again trusted with the ticket from the Narendra Nagar Constituency in the 2017 Uttarakhand Legislative Election and didn't disappoint the senior leaders of BJP and stood up to their expectations as he went on to win the election by a huge margin of 4972 votes. Since then, he has been a part of the council of ministers and has been assigned the following departments:

- Agriculture
- Plantation and horticulture
- Silk development

In the recently concluded 2022 Uttarakhand Legislative Assembly election, Subodh Uniyal got elected for the 4th time and 3rd straight time from the Narendra Nagar constituency as he emerged victorious by a margin of 1798 Votes. Uniyal is now being strongly considered to be the frontrunner for the post of Uttarakhand Chief Minister due to his strong image amongst the public and his fellow MLA's.

== Electoral performance ==
Election	Constituency	Party	Result	Votes %	Opposition Candidate	Opposition Party	Opposition vote %	Ref
2022	Narendranagar	BJP	Won	47.83%	Om Gopal Rawat	INC	44.70%	
2017	Narendranagar	BJP	Won	45.86%	Om Gopal Rawat	Independent	36.40%	
2012	Narendranagar	INC	Won	43.30%	Om Gopal Rawat	BJP	42.48%	
2007	Narendranagar	INC	Lost	28.90%	Om Gopal Rawat	UKD	28.91%	
2002	Narendranagar	INC	Won	28.84%	Lakhi Ram	BJP	24.34%	

== Achievements and honors ==
In January 2020, the Uttarakhand government was awarded the Krishi Karman award which entails a cash prize of Rs 5 crore by Prime Minister Narendra Modi in Bengaluru for good performance in agriculture sector in category II (hill states). Agriculture Minister Subodh Uniyal, said that the state has received the award because of the efforts of the agricultural department. He was quoted as saying “In the past three years, we have taken 70 major decisions in favour of farmers like having the country’s first Nursery Act and implementing innovative measures like identifying correct markets for farmers as per their commodity, and setting up standard prices of their produce. Hence, the award doesn’t come as a surprise.”

In October 2021, Uttarakhand has been conferred with the best horticulture State in the country award by the Agriculture True group. The award was presented to the Agriculture and Horticulture minister of Uttarakhand Subodh Uniyal by Union Agriculture minister Narendra Singh Tomar in New Delhi on Thursday during the 12th Agriculture leadership summit. Speaking on the occasion Uniyal said that though Uttarakhand is a small state having only 13 districts, it has dedicated itself completely to fulfil the dream of Prime Minister Narendra Modi to double the income of farmers.

Under the leadership of Subodh Uniyal, Uttarakhand became the only state in the country, which has made a provision of six months imprisonment under the Nursery Act.

== Ideology and work ethic ==
Subodh Uniyal has earned and built an image of being the People's Leader. He believes in the development and welfare of not only the people of the state, but also its infrastructure. He has strong beliefs that no state could develop if the women are not educated and for the fulfillment of this idea, he has constructed several schools and colleges in his constituency. His work in his constituency is a proof of how he has been dedicated to the task for which he has been elected by the people. Out of the 70 seats in Uttarakhand, Narendra Nagar leads the way when it comes to the education sector having 44 Inter Colleges, 22 High Schools, 4 Degree Colleges, 3 Polytechnics and 5 ITI's (all being the highest in the state). Since being elected for the first time, he has constructed over 3000 km of roads in the area and now his constituency has 100% road connectivity, which is very rare for a hilly area. When he was first elected the Narendra Nagar has just 12% electrification, but now the constituency has 100% electrification.
