= Haridwar =

Haridwar Mayapuri
- City
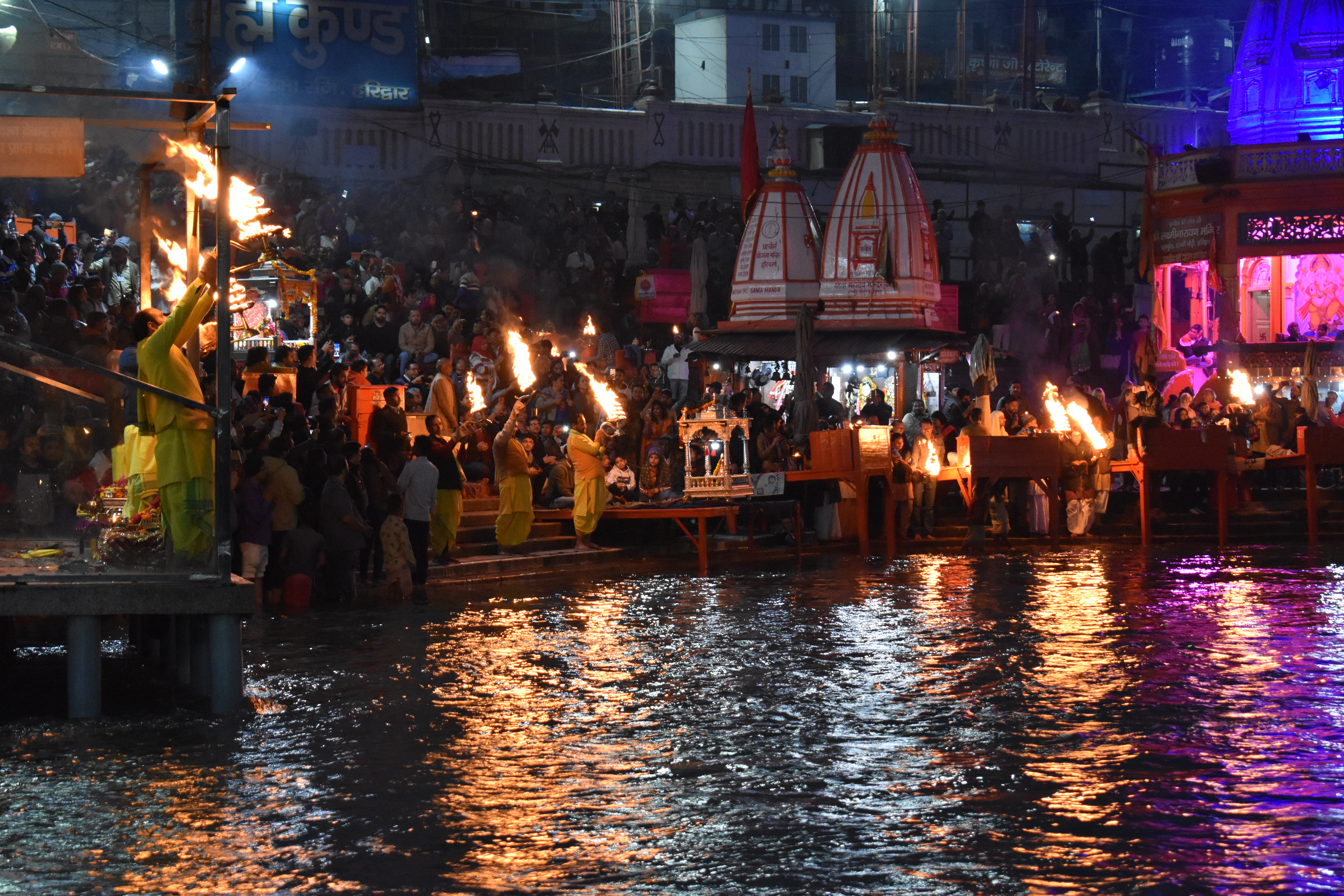
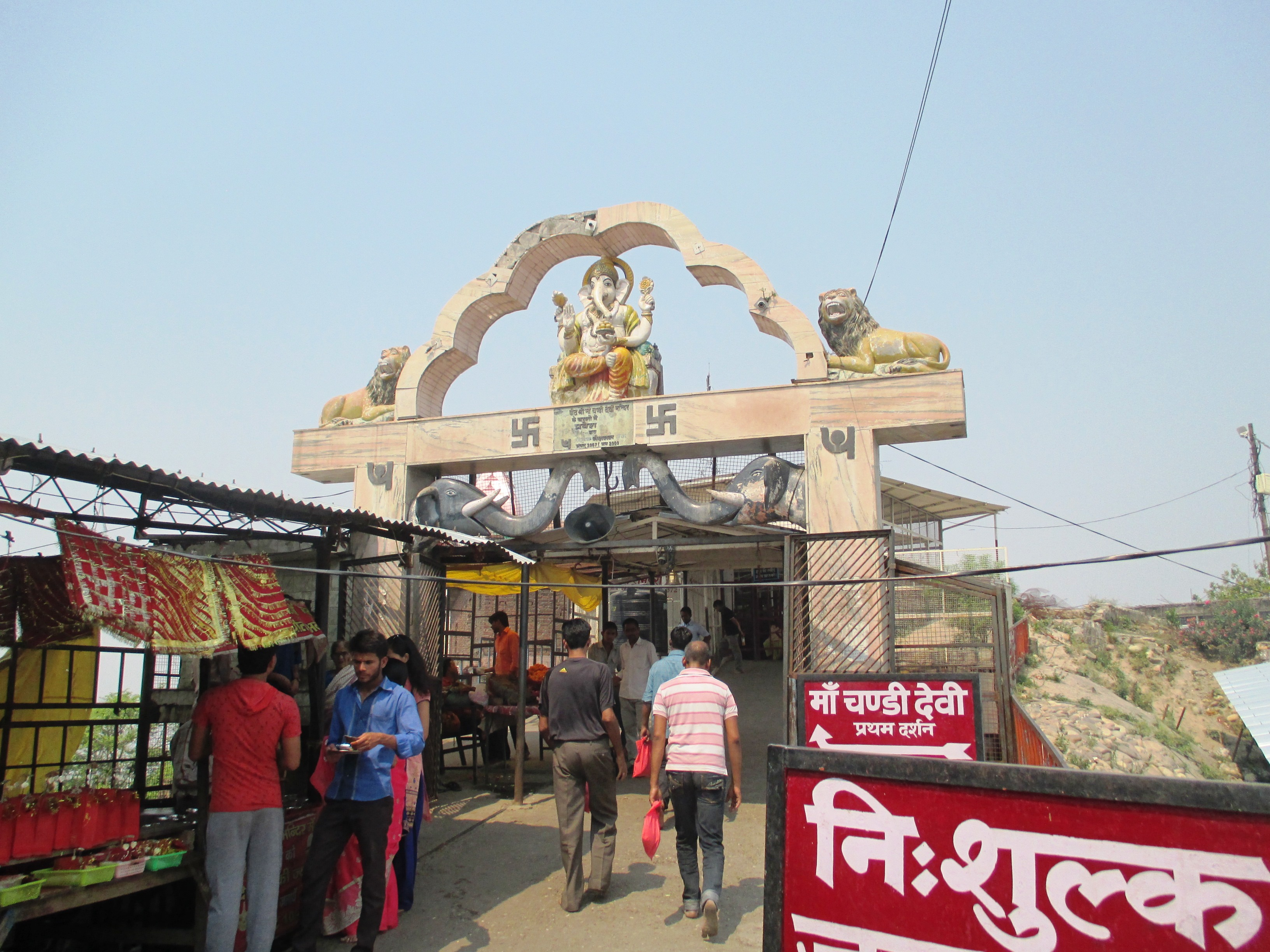
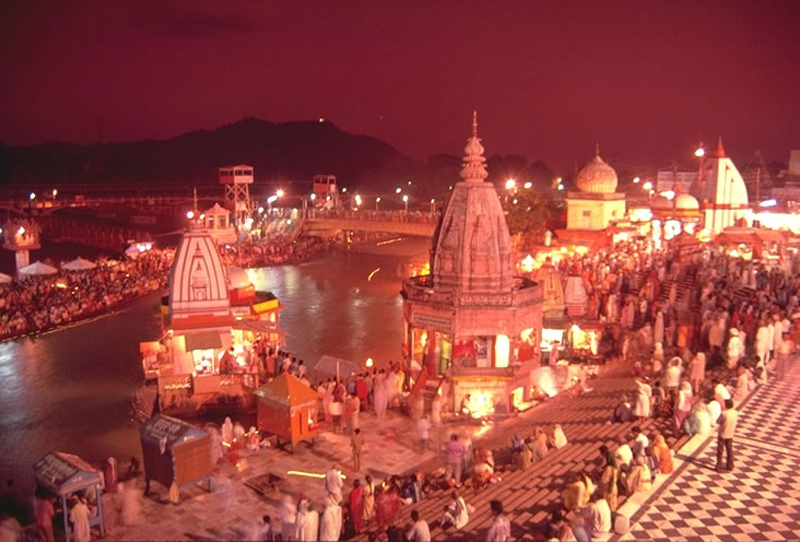
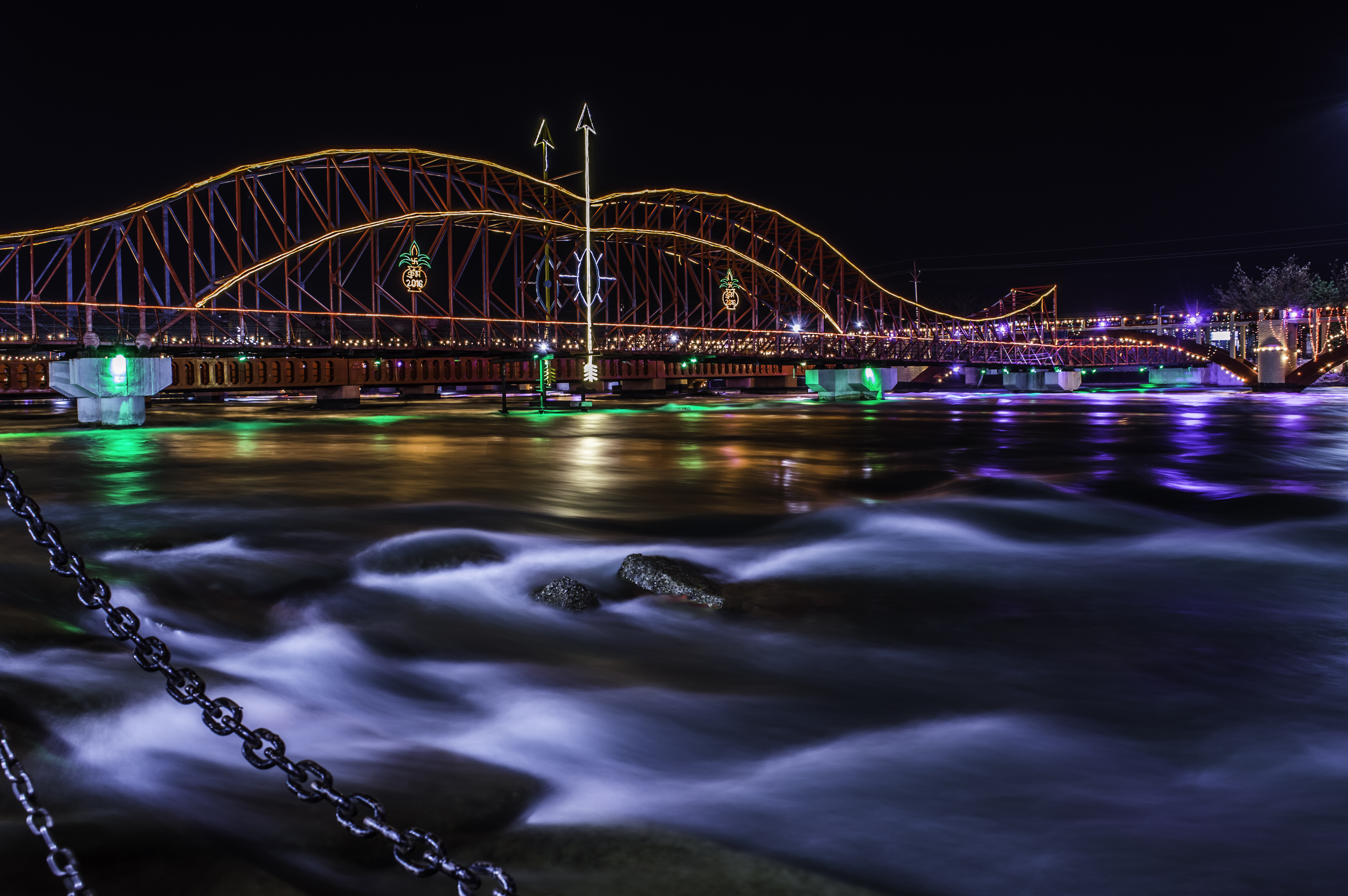
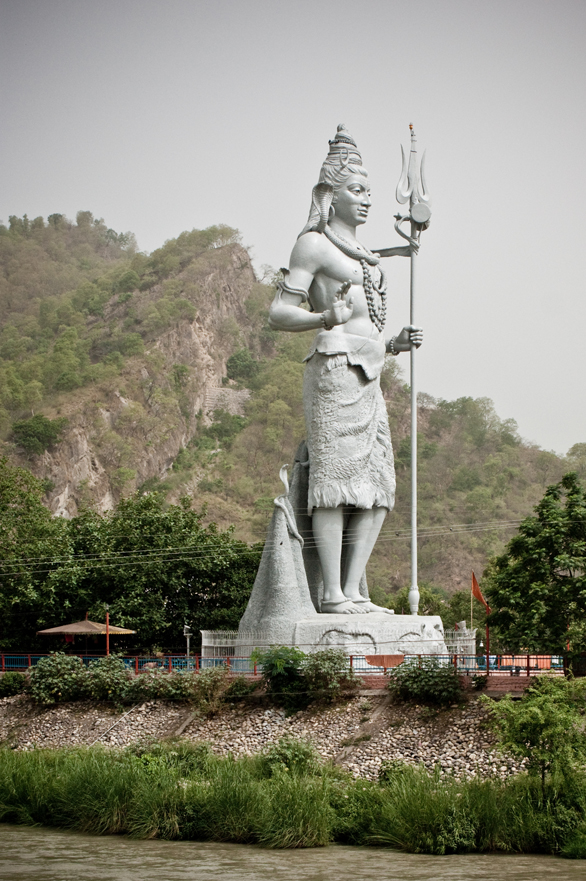
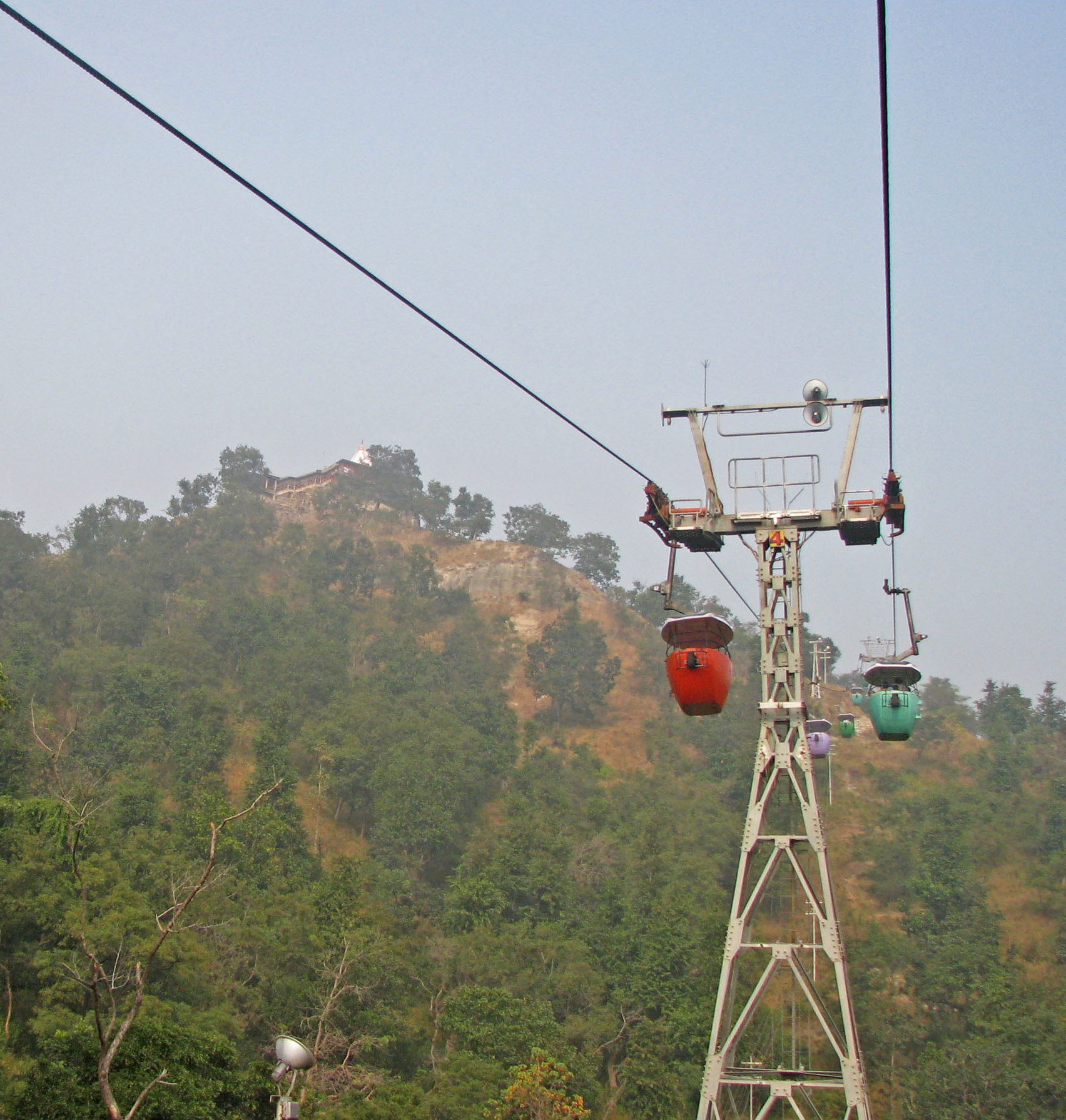
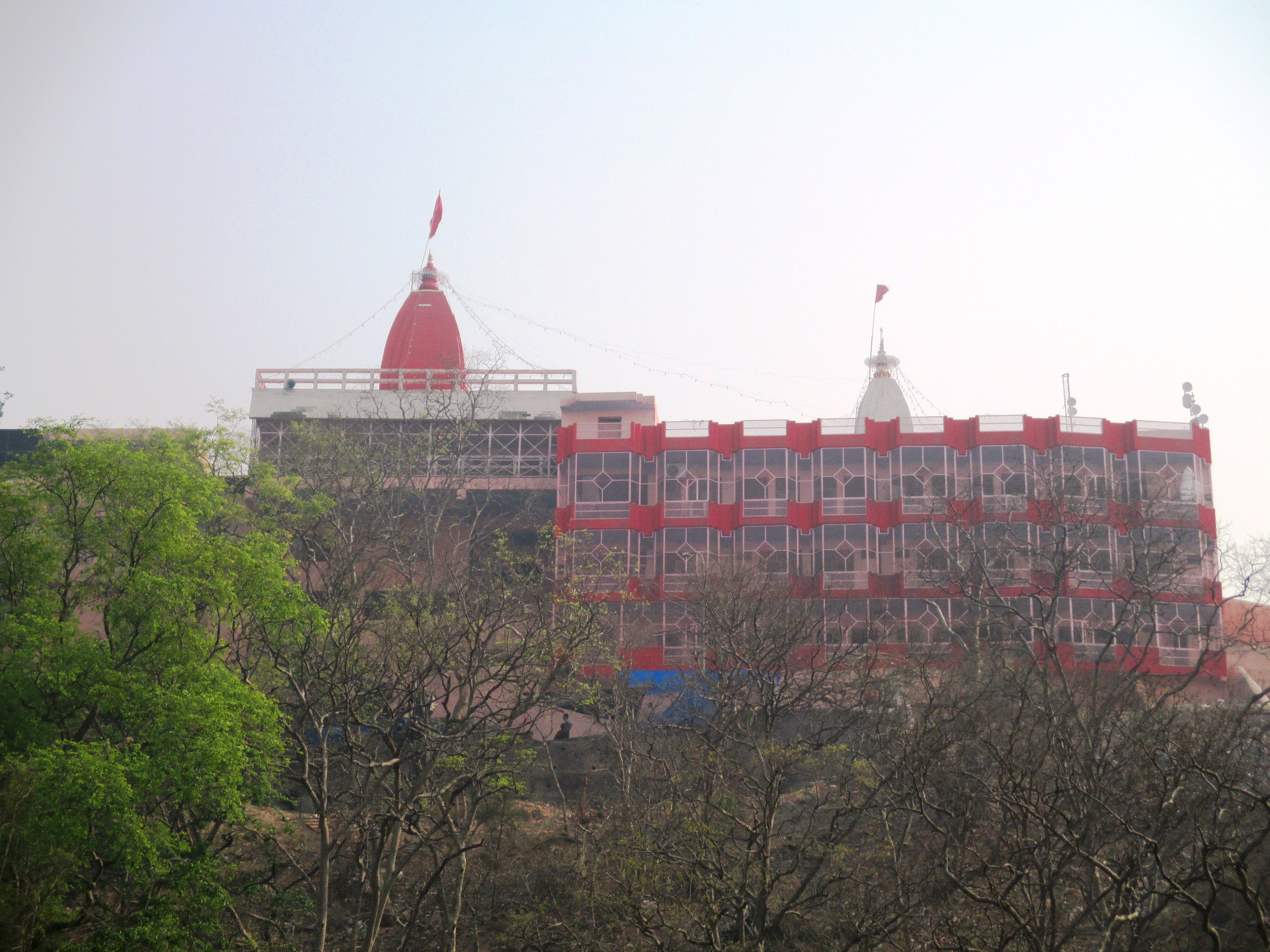
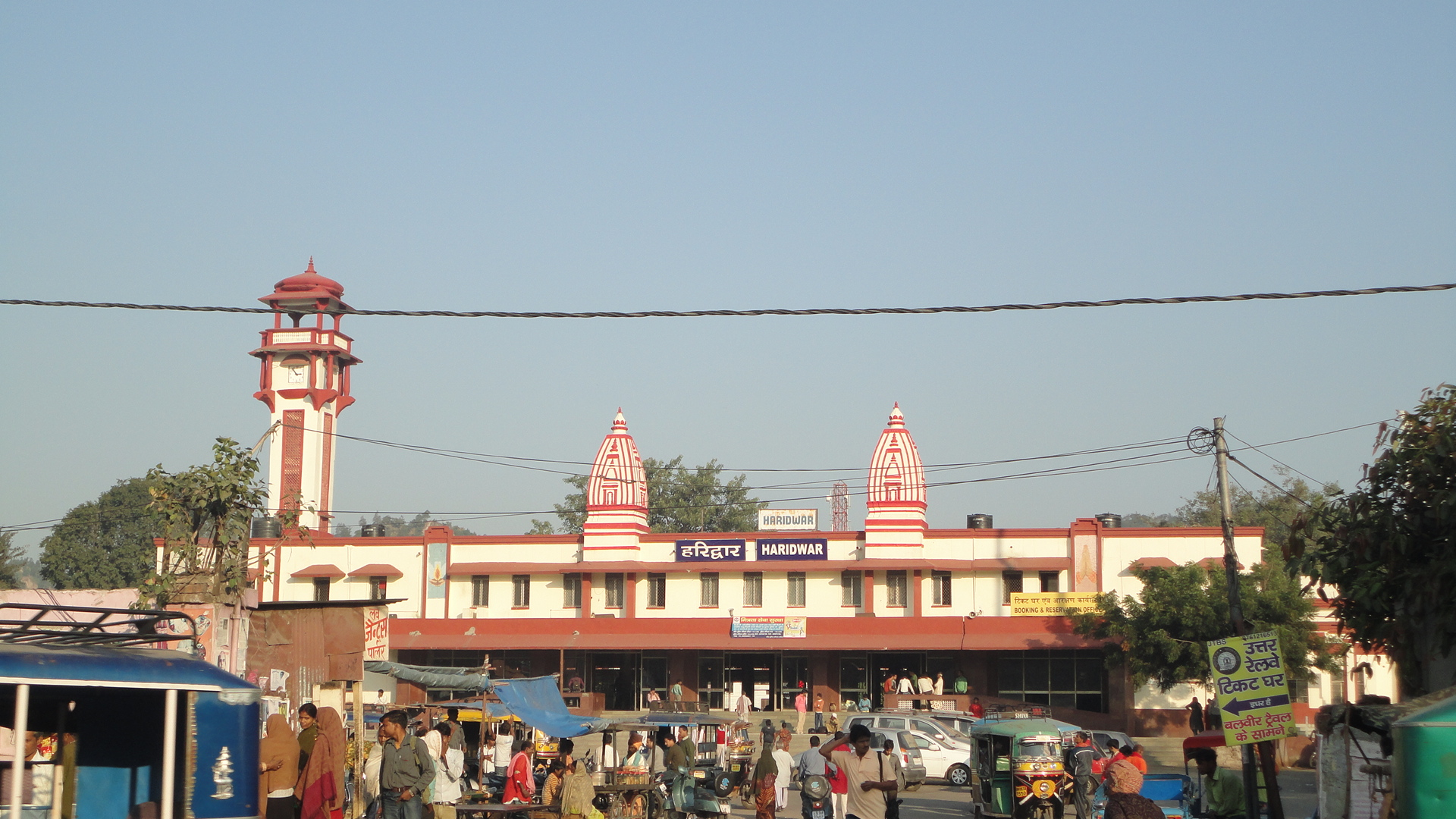
- Clockwise from top: Evening view of Har Ki Pauri, Chandi Devi Temple, Ropeway to Chandi Devi, view of the Ganga River, Haridwar railway station, Ganga Aarti at Har Ki Pauri, Shiv Murti during sunset and the Mansa Devi Temple.

- Location within Uttarakhand Location within India
- Coordinates: 29.945°N 78.163°E
- Country: India
- State: Uttarakhand
- District: Haridwar
- Municipality: 1868

Government
  - Type: Municipal Corporation
  - Body: Haridwar Municipal Corporation
  - Mayor: Kiran Jaisal (BJP)
  - Lok Sabha MP: Trivendra Singh Rawat (BJP)
  - MLA: Madan Kaushik (BJP)

Area
  - City: 105 km^{2} (41 sq mi)
- Elevation: 314 m (1,030 ft)

Population (2011)
  - City: 228,832
  - Metro: 231,338

Languages
  - Official: Hindi; Sanskrit
  - Native: Khariboli
- Time zone: UTC+5:30 (IST)
- PIN: 249401
- Telephone code: +91-1334
- Vehicle registration: UK-08
- Sex ratio: 1.18 ♂/♀
- Website: haridwar.nic.in

Haridwar (/ˌhʌrɪˈdwɑːr/; Hindi: [ɦəɾɪd̪waːɾ]; formerly Mayapuri) is a city and municipal corporation in the Haridwar district of Uttarakhand, India. With a population of 228,832 according to 2011 census, it is the second-largest city in the state and the largest in the district. Haridwar is located at the southwestern part of the state.

The city is situated on the right bank of the Ganges river, at the foothills of the Shivalik ranges. Haridwar lies in a doab region where people speak Khari Boli, which is a dialect of Hindi. The other districts of the doab region lie in Western Uttar Pradesh. Haridwar is regarded as a holy place for Hindus, hosting important religious events and serving as a gateway to several prominent places of worship. The word Haridwar means "the gateway to Lord Hari".

According to Puranic legend, Haridwar—along with Ujjain, Nashik, and Prayag—is one of four sites where drops of amrita, the elixir of immortality, accidentally spilled from a kumbha (pitcher) while being carried by the celestial bird deity Garuda just after the Samudra Manthana, or the churning of the ocean of milk. Brahma Kund, the spot where the amrita fell, is believed to be located at Har ki Pauri (literally, "footsteps of the Lord") and is considered the most sacred ghat of Haridwar.

To mark this event, each of these four locations celebrate a Kumbha Mela at various intervals of time. The Haridwar Kumbh Mela, held every 12 years, is the most significant event in this location. Millions of Hindu pilgrims, devotees, and tourists congregate to perform ritualistic bathing on the banks of the River Ganges to wash away their sins to attain moksha.

Haridwar is also the primary centre of the Kanwar pilgrimage, in which millions of participants carry sacred water from the Ganges across hundreds of miles to dispense as offerings in Shiva shrines; as well as a passage for the Chota Char Dham (the four principal pilgrim destinations in Uttarakhand: Gangotri, Yamunotri, Kedarnath, and Badrinath).

The city has industrial development in addition to its religious significance, including the State Industrial Development Corporation of Uttarakhand (SIDCUL) industrial estate and the nearby township of Bharat Heavy Electricals Limited (BHEL) and its affiliated ancillaries.

== Etymology ==
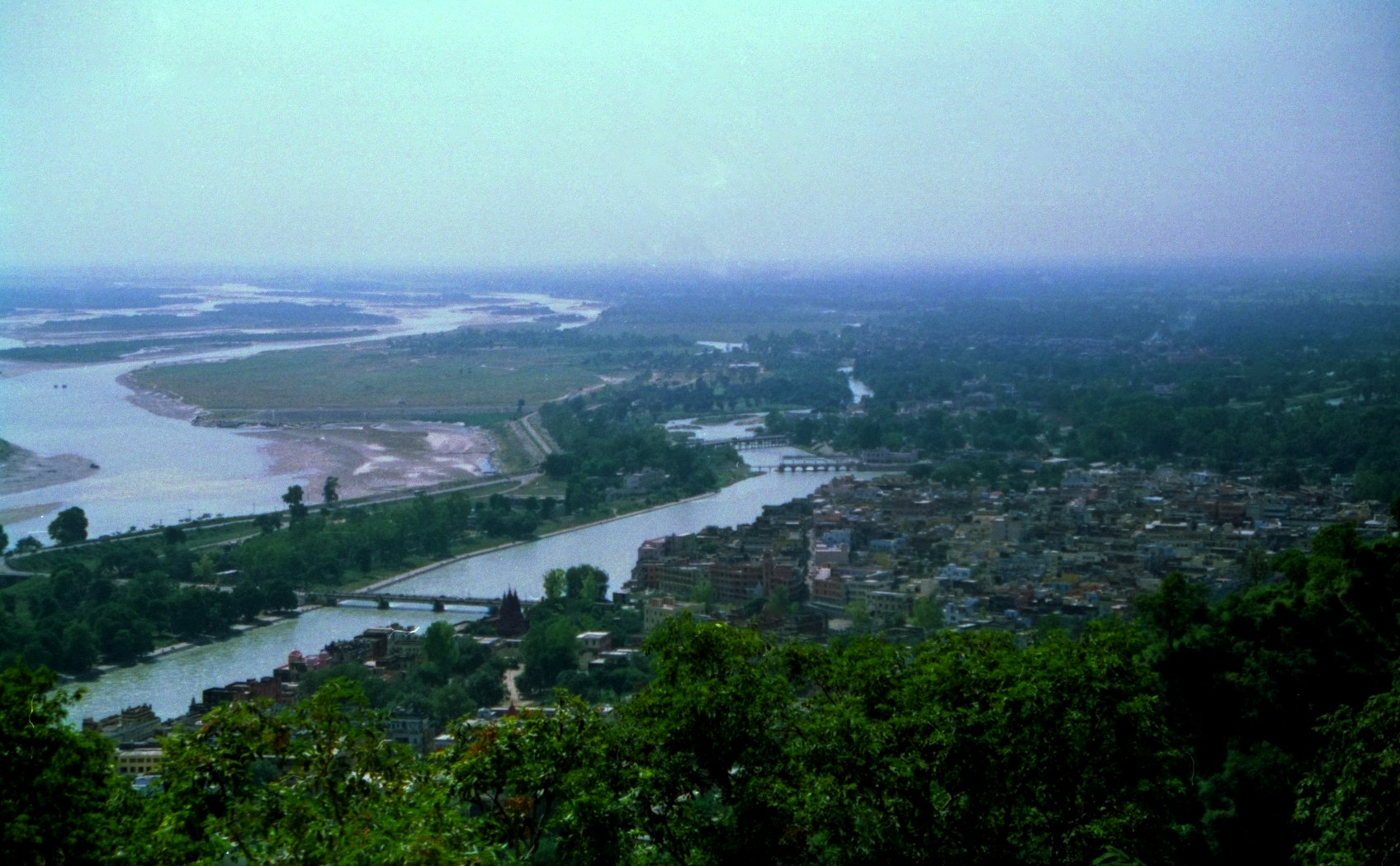
Meandering main Ganges River, known here as Neel Dhara (left) and the Ganga canal (right), passing through Haridwar.

The modern name of the town has two spellings: Haridwar and Hardwar. Each of these names has its own connotation.

In Sanskrit, the liturgical language of Hinduism, Hari means "Vishnu", and dvāra means "gateway". So, Haridwar translates to "the gateway to Vishnu" because it is typically where pilgrims start their journey to visit a prominent temple of Vishnu: Badrinath Temple.

Similarly, Hara could also mean "Shiva". Hence, Hardwar could stand for "the gateway to Shiva". Hardwar is also a typical place for pilgrims to start their journey in order to reach Mount Kailash, Kedarnath, the northernmost jyotirlinga and one of the sites of the smaller Char Dham pilgrimage circuit—all important places for worship for Hindus.

According to legend, it was in Haridwar that the goddess Ganga descended when Shiva released the mighty river from the locks of his hair. The River Ganga, after flowing for 253 km (157 mi) from its source at Gaumukh at the edge of the Gangotri Glacier, enters the Gangetic Plain for the first time at Haridwar, which gave the city its ancient name, Gangadwára.

In the annotations to her poetical illustration Hurdwar, a Place of Hindoo Pilgrimage, Letitia Elizabeth Landon provides information on this name derivation, and also the story of the supposed origin of the River Ganges. The accompanying plate is engraved from a painting by Samuel Prout. In sacred writings, it has been differently specified as "Kapilasthan", "Gangadwar", and "Mayapuri".

== History ==
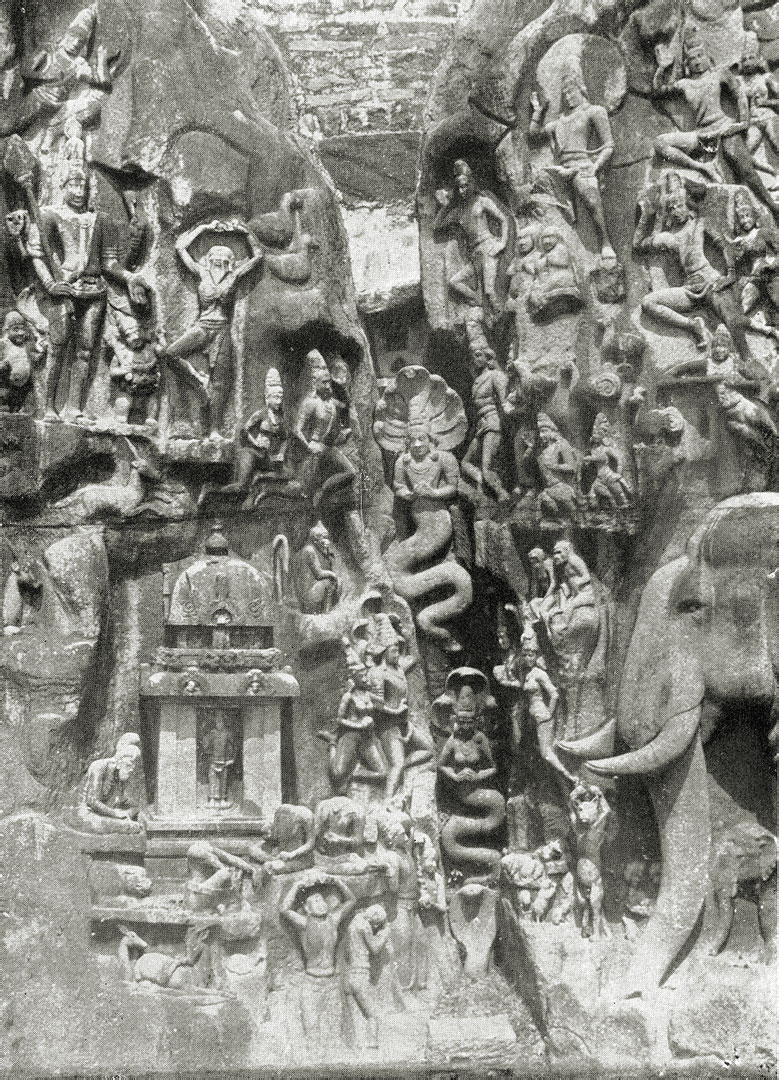
Prince Bhagiratha in penance for the salvation of 60,000 of his ancestors

In the scriptures, Haridwar has been variously mentioned as Kapilasthana, Gangadvāra, and Mayapuri. It is also an entry point to the Char Dham (the four main centres of pilgrimage in Uttarakhand: Badrinath, Kedarnath, Gangotri, and Yamunotri).

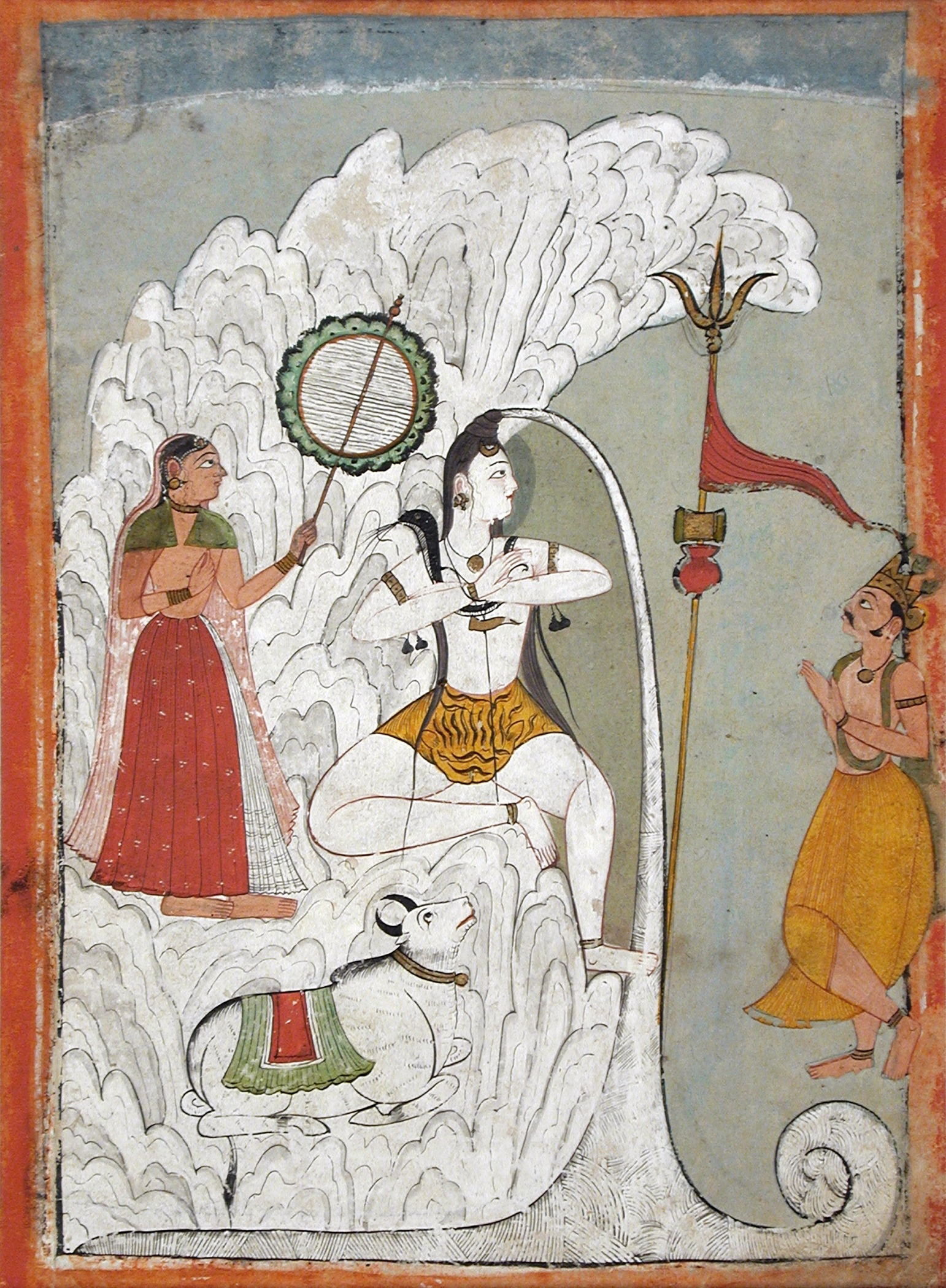
Gangadhara, Shiva bearing the Descent of the Ganges River as Parvati, Bhagiratha, and the bull Nandi look on. c. 1740

In the Vana Parva of the Mahabharata, where Sage Dhaumya tells Yudhishthira about the tirthas of India, Gangadvāra—i.e., Haridwar and Kankhal—have been referred to, the text also mentions that Sage Agastya did penance here, with the help of his wife, Lopamudra, the princess of Vidharba.

"O Yudhishthira, the spot where Ganga rusheth past, cleaving the foremost of mountains which is frequented by Gandharvas and Yakshas and Rakshasas and Apsaras, and inhabited by hunters, and Kinnaras, is called Gangadwara (Haridwar). O King, Sanatkumara regardeth that spot visited by Brahmarshis, as also the Tirtha Kanakhala (that is near to it), as sacred."

— The Mahabharata, Vana Parva: Tirthayatra Parva: Section XC.

Sage Kapila is said to have an ashram here, giving it its ancient name, Kapila or Kapilasthana.

The legendary king, Bhagiratha, the great-grandson of the Suryavamsha King Sagara, an ancestor of Rama, is said to have brought the River Ganges down from heaven, through years of penance in Satya Yuga, for the salvation of 60,000 of his ancestors from the curse of the Sage Kapila. This is a tradition continued by thousands of devout Hindus, who bring the ashes of their departed family members in hope of their salvation. Vishnu is said to have left his footprint on a stone set in the upper wall of Har Ki Pauri, where the Ganges touches it at all times.

Haridwar came under the rule of the Maurya Empire (322–185 BCE), and later under the Kushan Empire (c. 1st–3rd centuries). Archaeological findings have proved that terra cotta culture dating between 1700 BCE and 1200 BCE existed in this region. The first modern era written evidence of Haridwar is found in the accounts of a Chinese traveller, Huan Tsang, who visited India in 629 CE. during the reign of King Harshavardhana (590–647 CE) records Haridwar as "Mo-yu-lo", the remains of which still exist at Mayapur, a little to the south of the modern town. Among the ruins of a fort and three temples, decorated with broken stone sculptures, he also mentions the presence of a temple, north of Mo-yu-lo called "Gangadvara", the gateway of the Ganges.

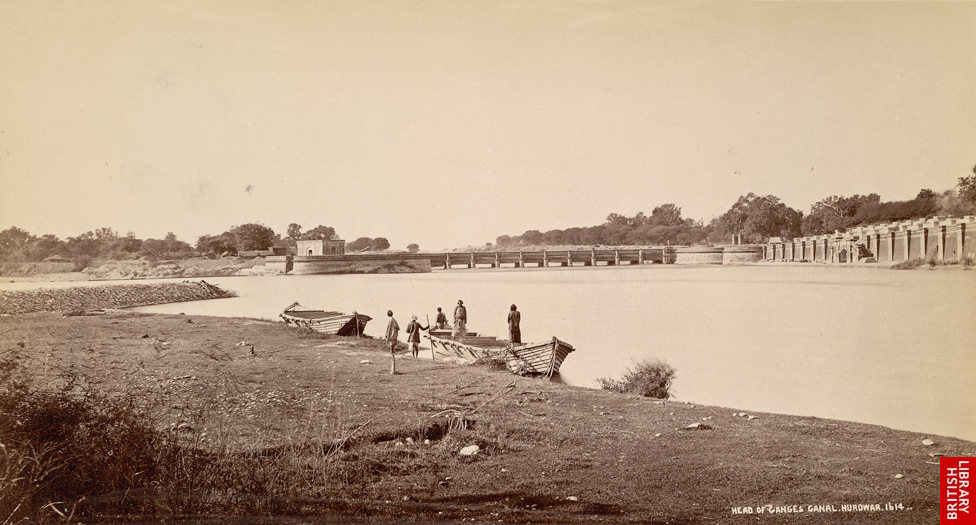
Head of the Ganges Canal, Haridwar, ca 1894–1898.

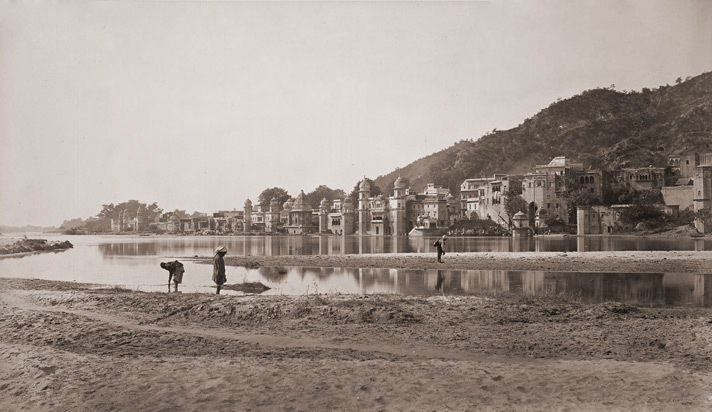
Haridwar from the opposite bank of the Ganges, 1866

Haridwar came under the rule of the Delhi Sultanate in 1206. The city also fell to the Central Asian conqueror Timur, also known as Tamerlane (1336–1405) on 13 January 1399.

The visit to Haridwar by Guru Nanak, the first Sikh guru, (1469–1539) bathed at Kushawart Ghat, wherein the famous "watering the crops" episode took place, is commemorated today by a gurudwara (Gurudwara Nanakwara). According to two Sikh Janamsakhis, this visit took place on the Baisakhi day in 1504 CE.

Guru Nanak later also visited Kankhal en route to Kotdwara in Garhwal. Pandas of the Haridwar have been known to keep genealogy records of most of the Hindu population. Known as Vahis, these records are updated on each visit to the city, and are a repository of vast family trees of the family in North India.

In the 16th century, the city came under the rule of the Mughals. Ain-e-Akbari, written by Abul Fazal in the 16th century during the reign of Mughal Emperor Akbar, refers to it as Maya (Mayapur), known as "Hardwar on the Ganges", as one of Hinduism's seven sacred cities. It further mentions it is 18 kos, each approximately 2 km (1.24 mi) in length, and large numbers of pilgrims assemble on the 10th of Chaitra. The document also mentions that during the Mughal emperor Akbar's travels and also while at home, he drank water from the Ganges, callint it "the water of immortality". Special people were stationed at Sorun and later Haridwar to dispatch water in sealed jars to wherever he was stationed.

During the Mughal period, Haridwar had a mint for Akbar's copper coinage. It is said that Raja Man Singh of Amber laid the foundation of the present-day city of Haridwar and also renovated the ghats at Har Ki Pauri. After his death, his ashes are also said to have been immersed at Brahma Kund. Thomas Coryat, an English traveller who visited the city in the reign of Emperor Jahangir (1596–1627) mentions it as "Haridwara", the capital of Shiva.

During the late 18th and early 19th centuries, Haridwar was under the control of the Garhwal Kingdom, serving as a strategic and economic gateway to the Himalayan pilgrimage routes. Following the Gurkha invasion of Garhwal in 1803–1804 and the subsequent Anglo‑Nepalese War, the region was ceded to the British East India Company under the Treaty of Sugauli (1815). Haridwar was then annexed into British India and incorporated into the Saharanpur District, permanently ending its political association with the Garhwal rulers.

One of the two major dams on the river Ganges, the Bhimgoda, is situated here. Built in the 1840s, it diverts the waters of the Ganges to the Upper Ganges Canal, which irrigated the surrounding lands. Though this caused severe deterioration to the Ganges water flow, and is a major cause for the decay of the Ganges as an inland waterway, which till the 18th century was used heavily by the ships of the East India Company, and a town as high up as Tehri, was considered a port city The headworks of the Ganges Canal system is located in Haridwar. The Upper Ganges Canal was opened in 1854 after the work began in April 1842, prompted by the famine of 1837–38. The unique feature of the canal is the half-km-long aqueduct over the Solani River at Roorkee, which raises the canal 25 m (82 ft) above the original river.

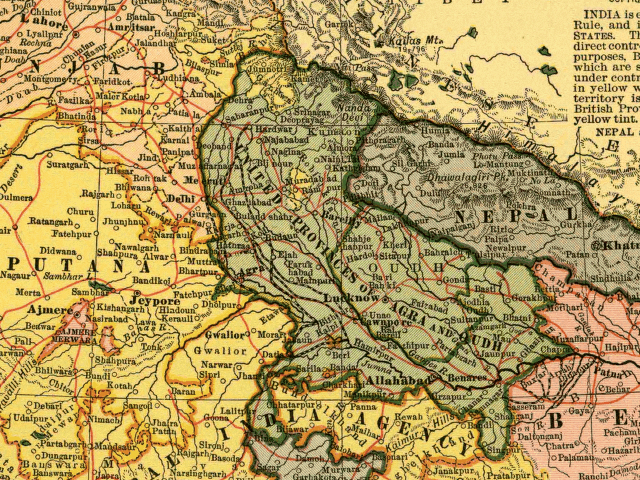
Haridwar as a part of the United Province, 1903

"Haridwar Union Municipality" was constituted in 1868, which included the then-villages of Mayapur, Jwalapur, and Kankhal. Haridwar was first connected with railways, via Laksar, through branch line in 1886, when the Awadh and Rohilakhand Railway line was extended through Roorkee to Saharanpur, later extended to Dehradun in 1900.

In 1901, Haridwar had a population of 25,597 and was part of the Roorkee tehsil in the Saharanpur district of the United Provinces of Agra and Oudh, remaining so till the creation of Uttar Pradesh in 1947.

Haridwar has been an abode of the weary in body, mind, and spirit. It has also been a centre of attraction for learning various arts, science, and culture. The city has a long-standing position as a great source of ayurvedic medicines and herbal remedies and is home to the unique Gurukul (school of traditional education), including the Gurukul Kangri Vishwavidyalaya, which has a vast campus and has been providing traditional education of its own kind since 1902.

The development of Haridwar took an upturn in the 1960s with the setting up of a temple of modern civilisation, BHEL, a "Maharatna Public Sector Undertaking" in 1975, which brought along not just its own township of BHEL, Ranipur, close to the existing Ranipur village but also a set of ancillaries in the region. The University of Roorkee, now IIT Roorkee, is one of the oldest and most prestigious institutes of learning in the fields of science and engineering.

By law, no meat, fish, and eggs are sold within the city. The reason for such prohibition is to maintain the religious purity and holiness of the pilgrimage city.

== Geography and climate ==
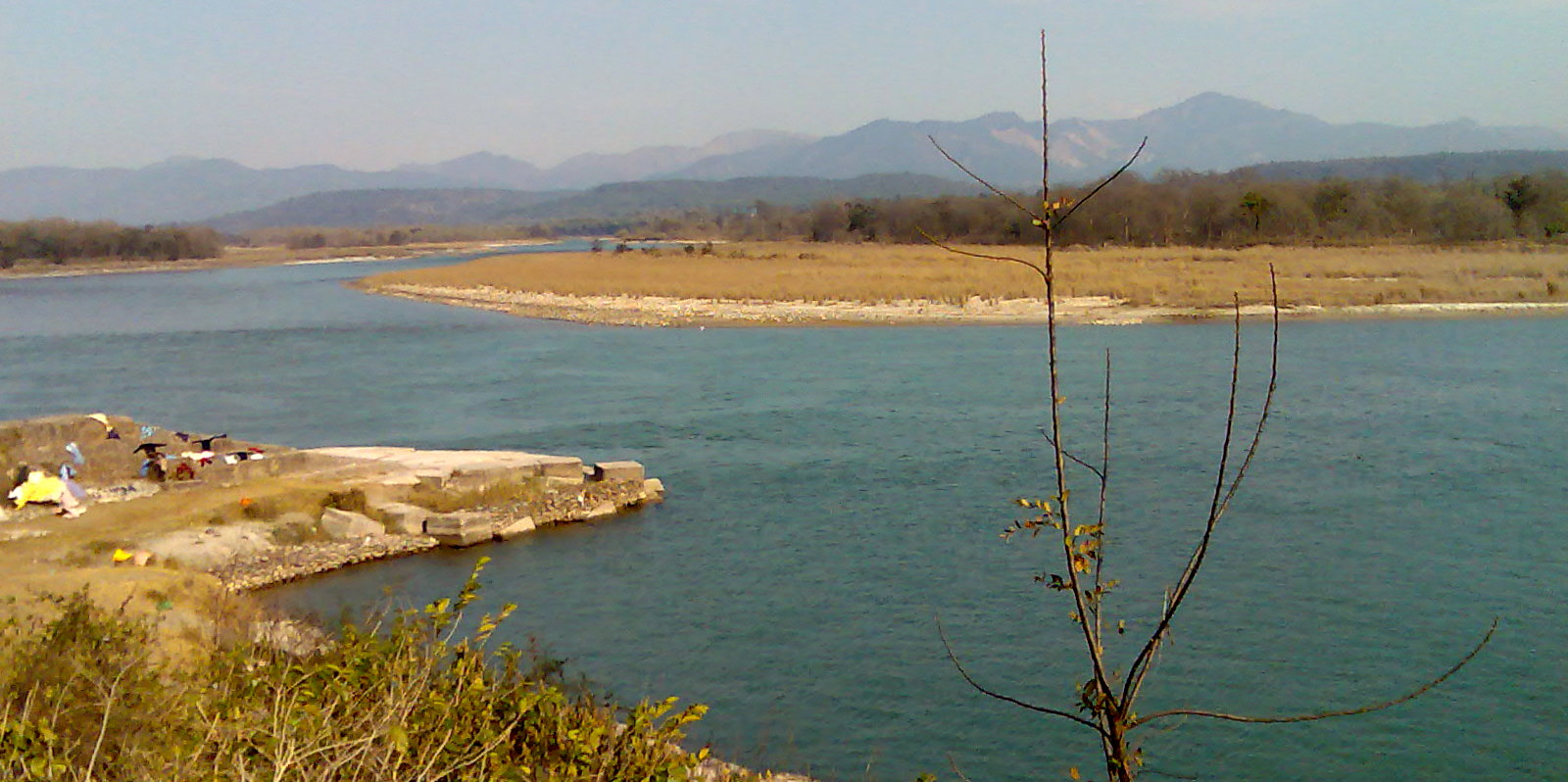
Neeldhara Bird Sanctuary at the main Ganges Canal, before Bhimgoda Barrage, also showing signs of an ancient port

Haridwar district, covering an area of about 2,360 km^{2} (910 sq mi), is in the southwestern part of the state of Uttarakhand. It is situated at a height of 314 m (1,030 ft) from the sea level, between Shivalik Hills in the north and northeast and the River Ganges in the south. A large part of the district is forested.

The Ganges emerges from the mountains to touch the plains. The water is mostly clear and generally cold, except in the monsoon, during which soil from the upper regions flows down into it. The Ganges flows in a series of channels separated from each other called aits, most of which are also well forested. Other minor seasonal streams are the Ranipur Rao, Pathri Rao, Ravi Rao, Harnaui Rao, and Begham Nadi.

Rajaji National Park is within the bounds of the district, accessible through different gates; the Ramgarh Gate and Mohand Gate are within 25 km (16 mi) of Dehradun; the Motichur, Ranipur and Chilla Gates, about 9 km (5.6 mi) from Haridwar; Kunaon Gate, 6 km (3.7 mi) from Rishikesh; and Laldhang gate, 25 km (16 mi) from Kotdwara.

=== Climate ===
Temperatures:

- Summers: 25 to 44 °C (77 to 111 °F)
- Winters: −1 to 24 °C (30 to 75 °F)

Climate data for Haridwar
Month	Jan	Feb	Mar	Apr	May	Jun	Jul	Aug	Sep	Oct	Nov	Dec	Year
Mean daily maximum °C (°F)	20 (68)	22 (72)	27 (81)	33 (91)	36 (97)	34 (93)	31 (88)	30 (86)	30 (86)	29 (84)	26 (79)	22 (72)	28 (83)
Mean daily minimum °C (°F)	7 (45)	9 (48)	13 (55)	18 (64)	21 (70)	23 (73)	23 (73)	23 (73)	21 (70)	17 (63)	11 (52)	8 (46)	16 (61)
Average precipitation mm (inches)	72 (2.8)	76 (3.0)	78 (3.1)	55 (2.2)	113 (4.4)	296 (11.7)	599 (23.6)	568 (22.4)	301 (11.9)	102 (4.0)	23 (0.9)	91 (3.6)	2,374 (93.6)
Source: Sunmap

== Cityscape ==
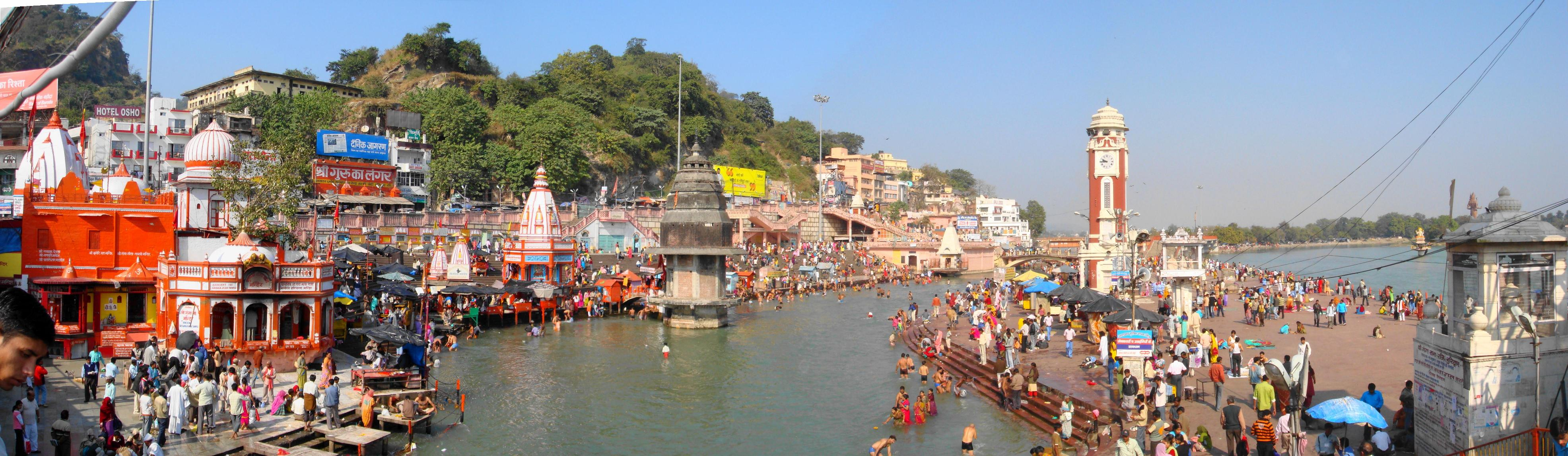
Panoramic view of Har ki Pauri

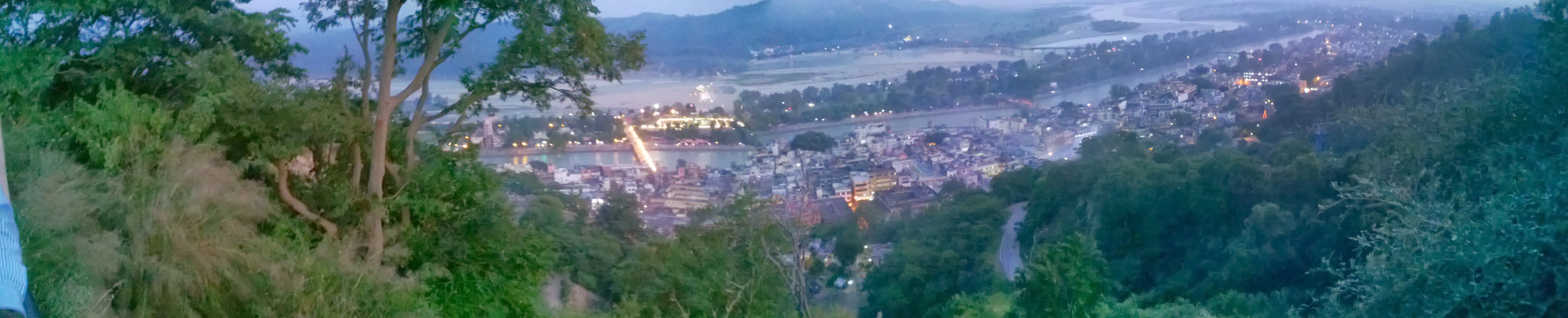
Panorama of Haridwar city from Mansa Devi Temple

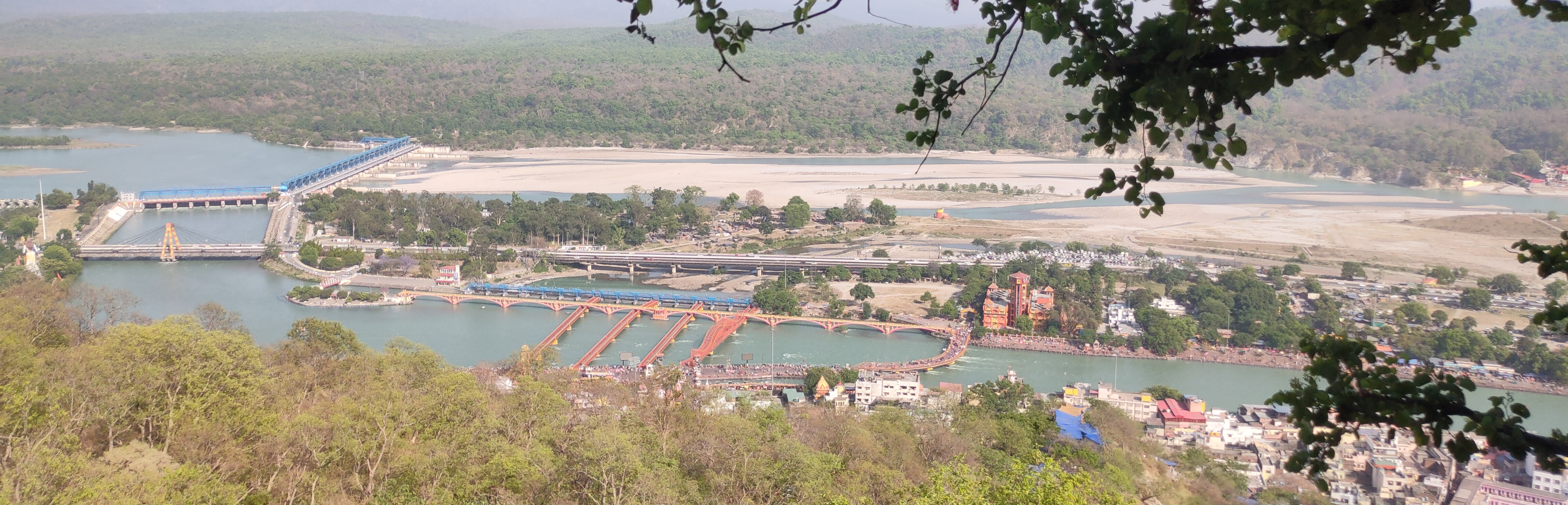
Panoramic view of Haridwar city from Mansa Devi Temple

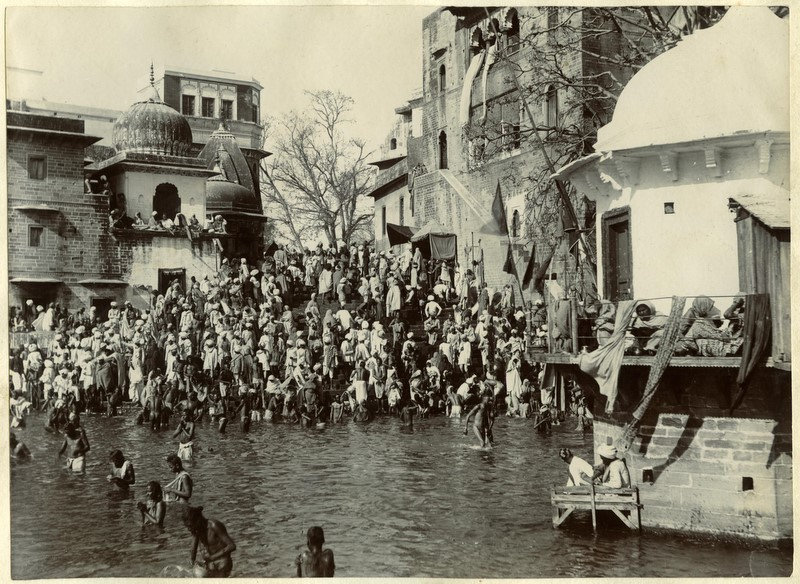
Main bathing ghat at Hardwar in the 1880s

== Demographics ==
Religions in Haridwar City (2011)
Religion	Percent
Hinduism	82.66%
Islam	15.70%
Sikhism	0.86%
Others†	0.78%
Distribution of religions †Includes Christians, Jains and Buddhists.

As of the 2011 India census, Haridwar district had a population of 1,890,422, an increased from 1,447,187 in 2001. Haridwar city had a 310,562 population in 2011, with males constituting 54% of the population and females, 46%. The average literacy rate was 70%, higher than the national average of 59.5%, of which male literacy was 75%, and female literacy, 64%. Twelve percent of the population was under six years of age.

The linguistic breakdown of Haridwar city was Hindi, 92.0%; Urdu, 4.46%; Punjabi, 1.38%; and Others, 2.20%.

For centuries, whenever Hindus visited Haridwar for any purpose, it has been a custom to go to the pandit in charge of one's family register and update the family tree with details of marriages, births, and deaths from one's extended joint family.

== Religious sites ==
"Haridvāre Kuśāvarte Bilvake Nīla parvate
snatvā Kanakhale tīrth punarjanma na vidyate"

In Hindu traditions, the 'Panch Tirth' (Five Pilgrimages) within Haridwar, are "Gangadwar" (Har ki Pauri), Kushawart (Ghat in Kankhal), Bilwa Tirtha (Mansa Devi Temple) and Neel Parvat (Chandi Devi Temple). There are several other temples and ashrams located in and around the city, a list of which can be found below. Also, alcohol and non-vegetarian food is not permitted in Haridwar.

=== Har Ki Pauri ===
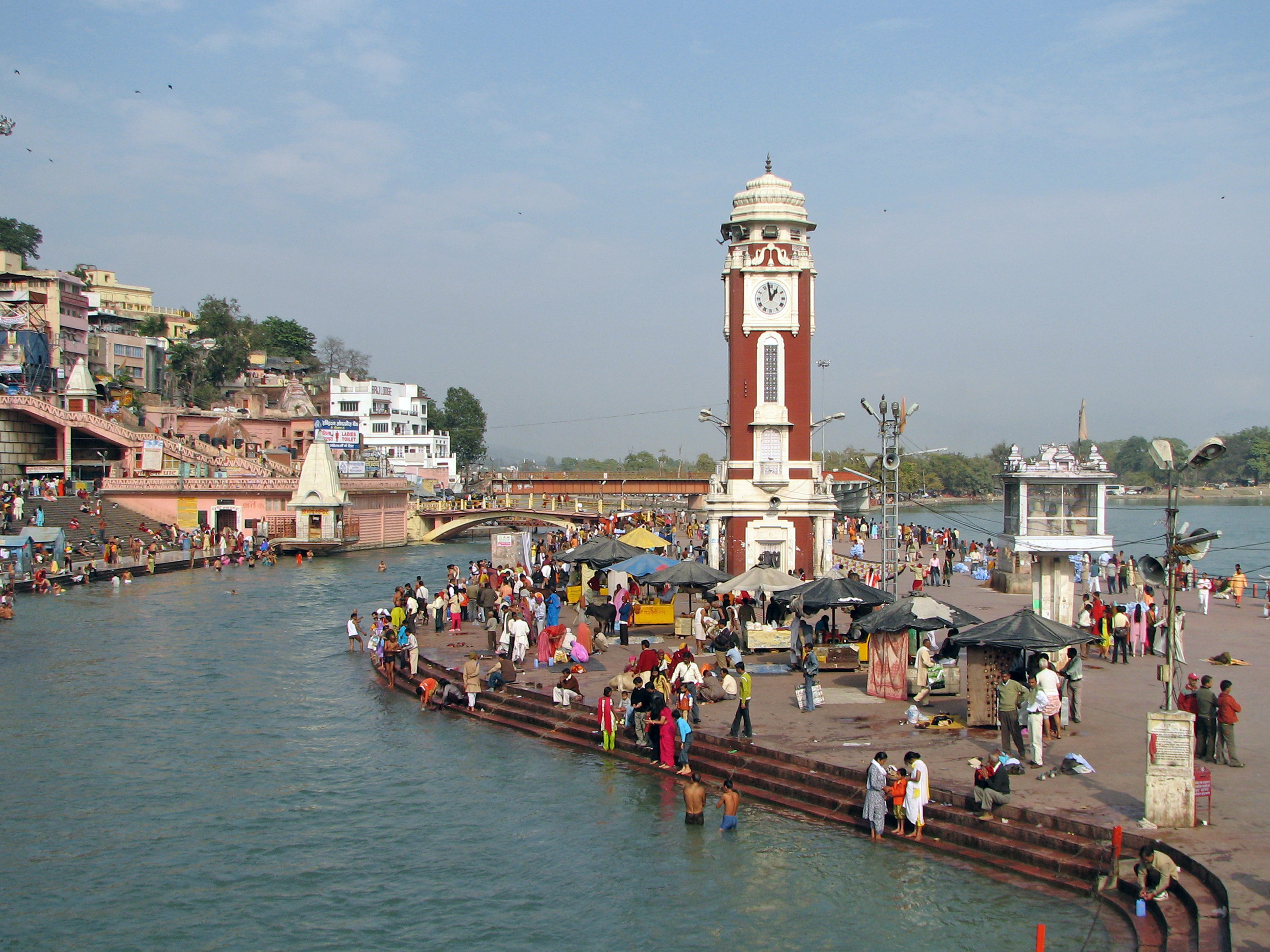
The Clock Tower on the Malviya Dwip at Har Ki Pauri.

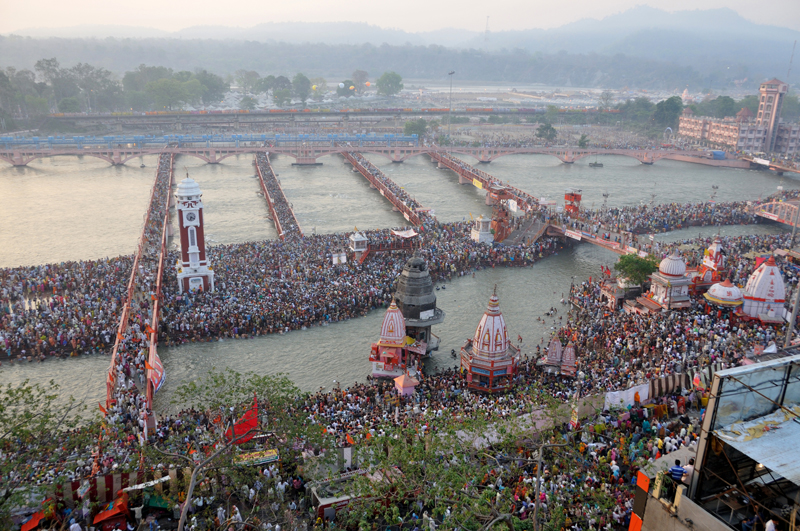
The Haridwar Kumbh Mela is held in every 12 years and the date is determined by Hindu astrology.

This ghat was constructed by King Vikramaditya (1st century BCE) in memory of his brother Bharthari. It is believed that Bharthari came to Haridwar and meditated on the banks of the holy Ganges. When he died, his brother constructed a ghat in his name, which later came to be known as Har Ki Pauri. The most sacred ghat within Har Ki Pauri is Brahmakund. The evening prayer (Aarti) is offered at dusk to Goddess Ganga at Har Ki Pauri (steps of God Hara or Shiva). A spectacle of sound and colour is seen when after the ceremony, pilgrims float Diyas (floral floats with lamps) and incense on the river, commemorating their deceased ancestors. Thousands of pilgrims from all around the world make a point to attend this prayer on their visit to Haridwar. On the night of Dussehra or a few days before that, the Ganga Canal is dried in Haridwar to clean the riverbed. The water is restored on Diwali. It is believed that on Dussera Maa Ganga goes to her father's house and returns after Bhai Duj or Bhai Phota. It is for this reason that the waters in the Ganga canal in Haridwar are partially dried on the night of Dussehra and the waters are restored on the day of Bhai Duj or Bhai Phota.

=== Chandi Devi Temple ===
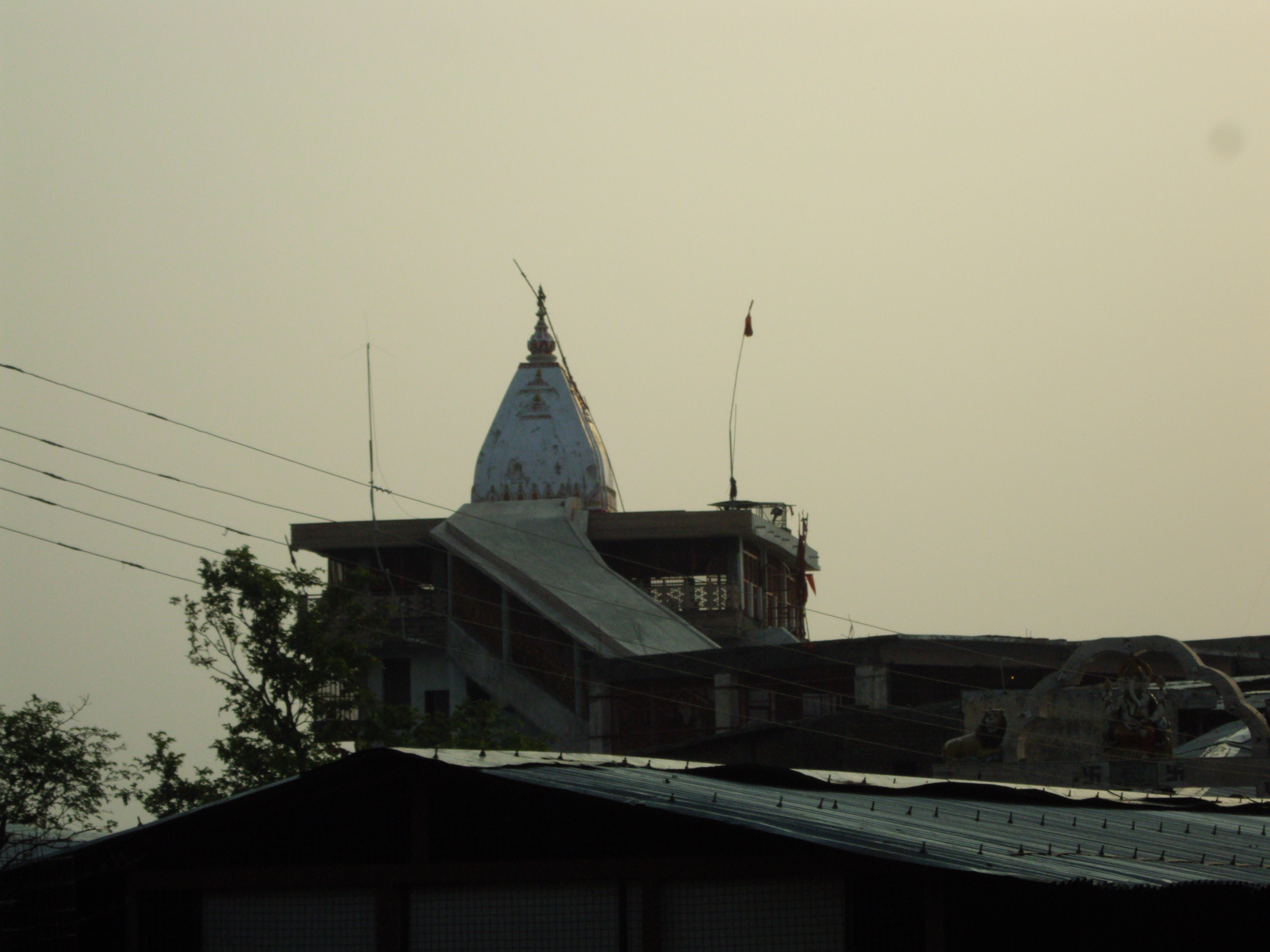
Chandi Devi Temple, Haridwar

The temple is dedicated to Goddess Chandi, who sits atop the 'Neel Parvat' on the eastern bank of the river Ganges. It was constructed in 1929 CE by the king of Kashmir, Suchat Singh. Skanda Purana mentions a legend, in which Chanda-Munda, the Army Chief of a local Demon Kings Shumbha and Nishumbha were killed by goddess Chandi here, after which the place got the name, Chandi Devi.

It is believed that the main statue was established by the Adi Shankaracharya in the 8th century CE. The temple is a 3 km (1.9 mi) trek from Chandighat and can also be reached through a ropeway. The temple's present structure was built in 1929 AD by Suchat Singh, a ruler of Kashmir.

The temple had an 800-year-old ritual animal sacrifice tradition wherein a goat was sacrificed on the Saptmi to Goddess Chandi. In 2015, the tradition was stopped by the head priest citing lowered acceptance by locals.

=== Mansa Devi Temple ===
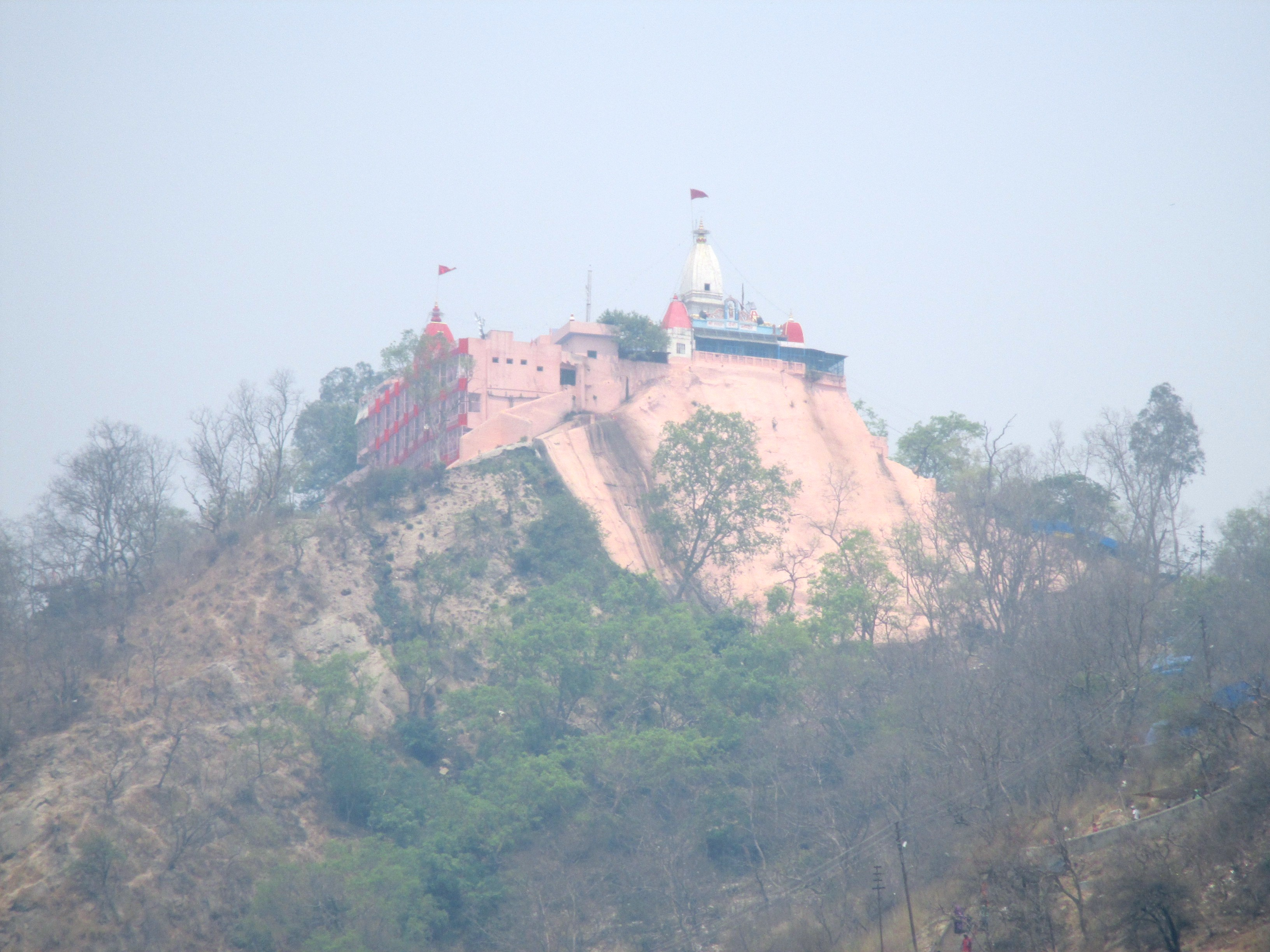
Mansa Devi Temple, Haridwar

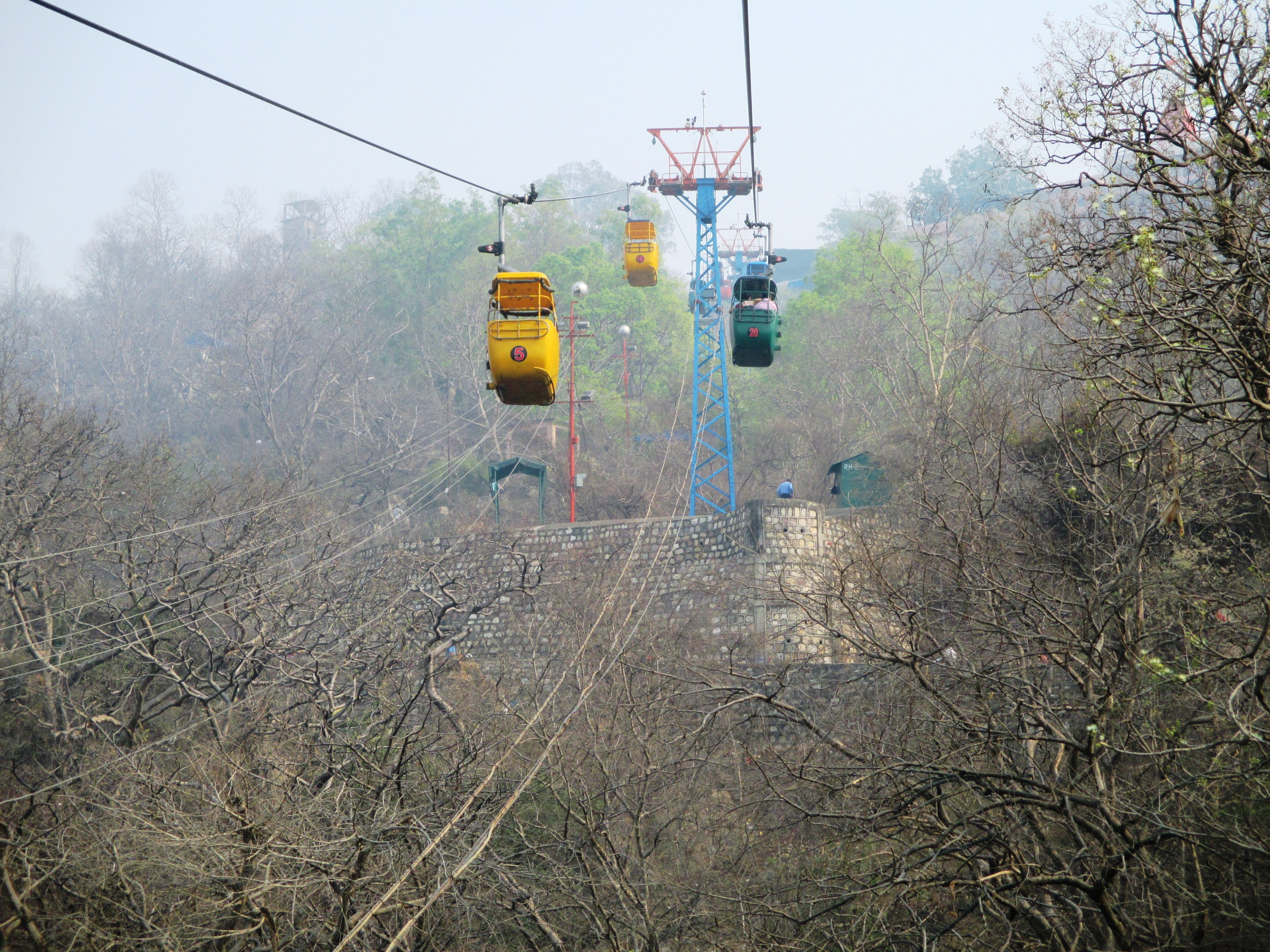
Ropeway to Mansa Devi Temple, Haridwar

The temple of Goddess Mansa Devi is situated at the top of the Bilva Parvat, literally means 'goddess fulfilling desires'. The main temple houses two idols of the Goddess, one with three mouths and five arms, while the other one has eight arms.

=== Maya Devi Temple ===
Haridwar was previously known as Mayapuri which is because of the Goddess Maya Devi. Dating to the 11th century CE, this ancient temple of Maya Devi, the Adhishthatri Devi (Patron Goddess) of Haridwar, is considered one of the Siddhapithas and is said to be the place where the heart and navel of Goddess Sati had fallen. It is one of few ancient temples still standing in Haridwar, along with Narayani Shila temple and Bhairav Temple.

=== Makarvahini Temple ===
Located close to the Birla Ghat, near Laltarao Pul is a temple dedicated to Goddess Ganga. This temple was established by Jayandra Saraswati, Shankaracharya of Kanchi Kamakoti, a few decades ago. The temple, built in South-Indian style, has a traditional custom of decorating the goddess with vegetables and dry fruits, giving her the title of Shakumbhari on Ashtami Pooja, the eighth day of Navratri.

=== Kankhal ===
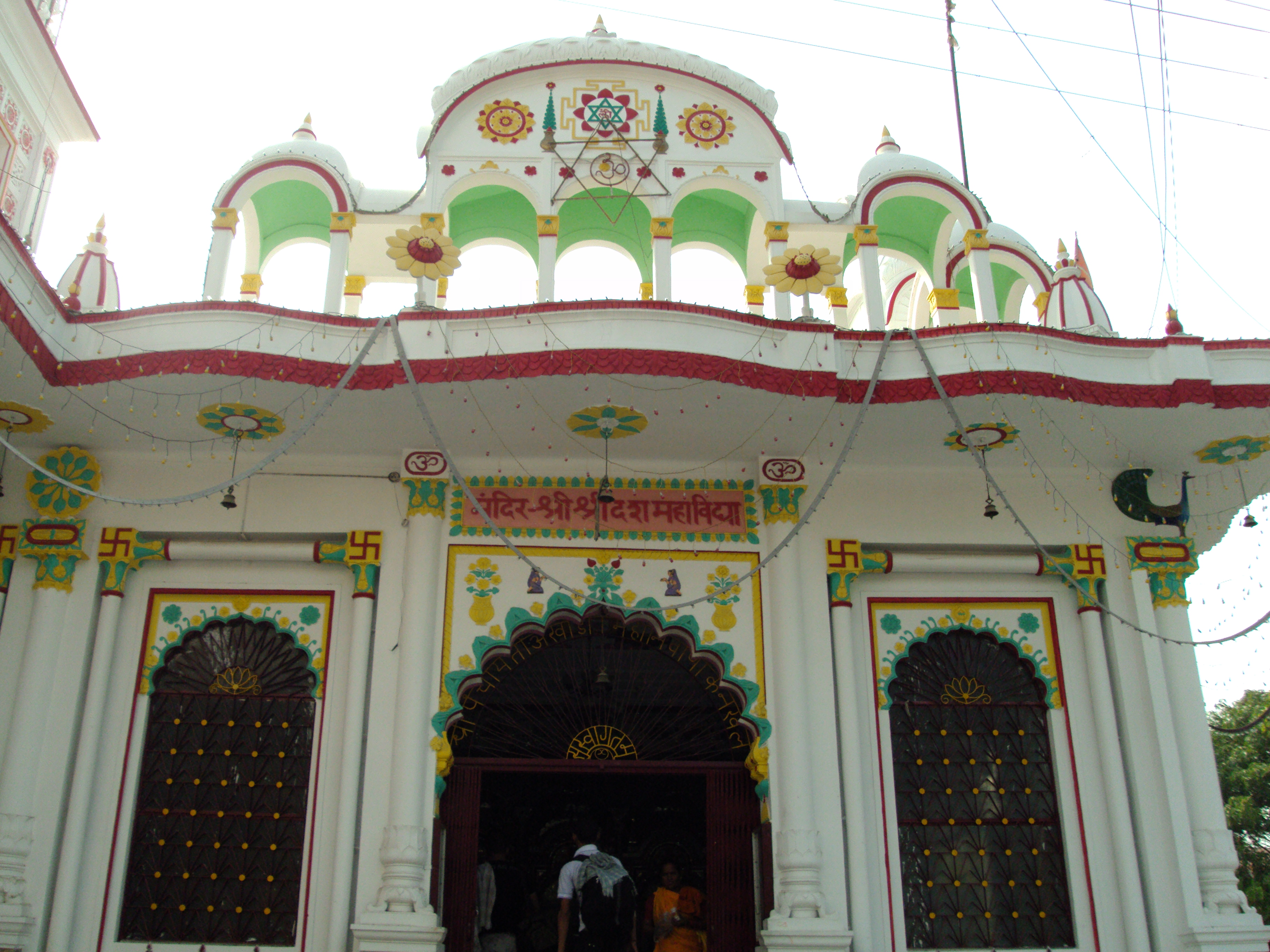
Das Mahavidya temple, Daksheswara Mahadev temple

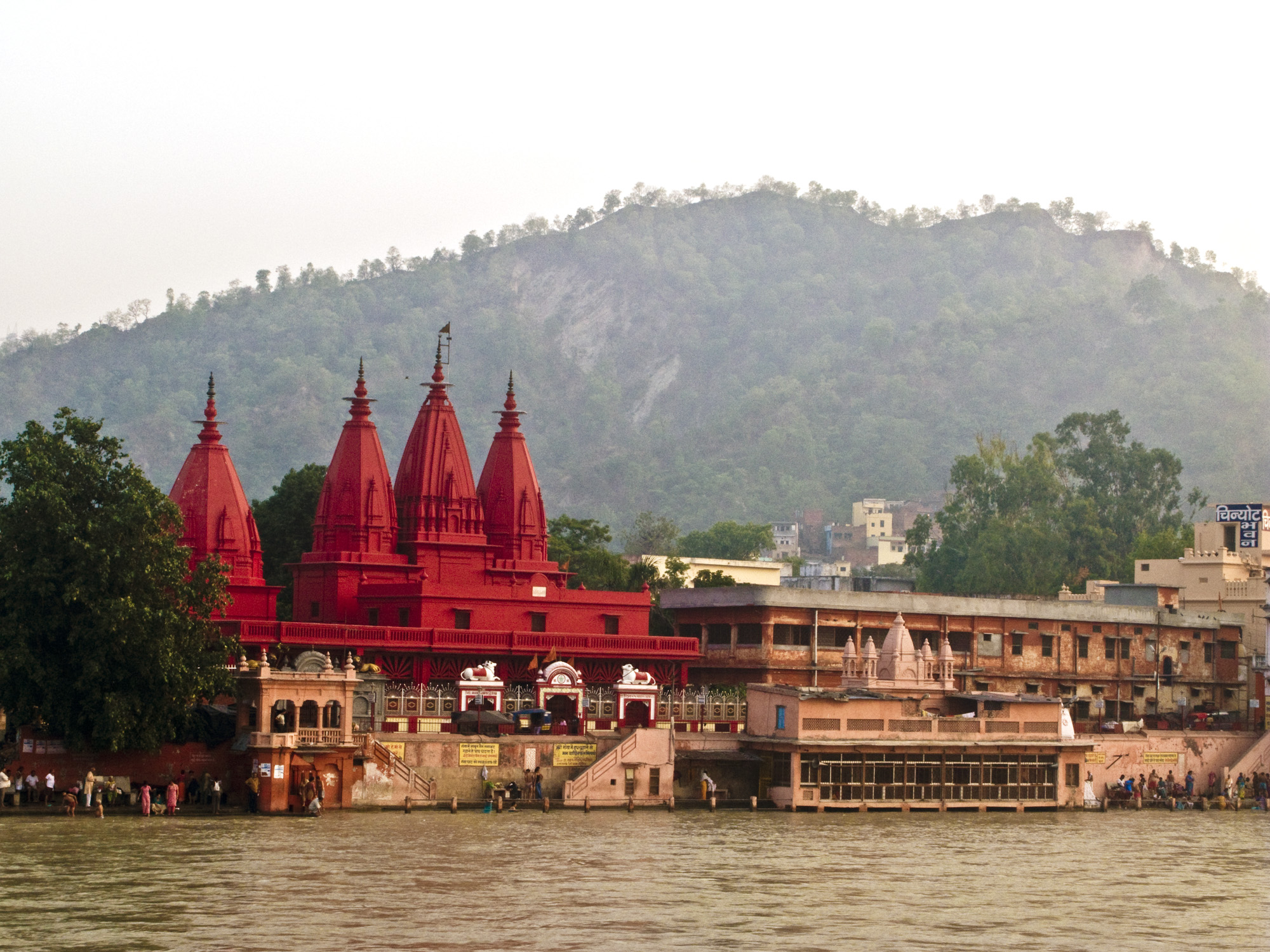
Bholanath Sevashram temple by the Ganges, Haridwar

The ancient temple of Daksha Mahadev also known as Daksheshwar Mahadev Temple has situated in the south Kankhal town. According to Hindu texts, King Daksha Prajapati, father of Dakshayani, Shiva's first wife, performed a yagña, to which he deliberately did not invite Shiva. When she arrived uninvited, he was further insulted by the king, seeing which Sati felt infuriated and self-immolated herself in the yagna kund. King Daksha was later killed by Virabhadra, born out of Shiva's anger. Later the king was brought to life and given a goat's head by Shiva. Daksha Mahadev temple is a tribute to this legend.

Sati Kund, another historical heritage is situated in the Kankhal. Legend has it that Sati immolated herself in this kund.

=== Bharat Mata Mandir ===
Bharat Mata Mandir is a multi-storey temple dedicated to Bharat Mata (Mother India). Bharat Mata Mandir was inaugurated on 15 May 1983 by Indira Gandhi on the banks of the river Ganges. It is situated adjacent to the Samanvaya Ashram, and stands eight stories tall to a height of 180 feet (55 m). Each floor depicts an era in the Indian history, from the days of Ramayana until India's independence.

On the first floor is the statue of Bharat Mata. The second floor, Shur Mandir, is dedicated to the well-renowned heroes of India. The third floor Matri Mandir is dedicated to the achievements of India's revered women, such as Radha, Mira, Savitri, Draupadi, Ahilya, Anusuya, Maitreyi, Gargi etc. The great saints from various religions, including Jainism, Sikhism, and Buddhism are featured on the fourth floor Sant Mandir. The assembly hall with walls depicting symbolic coexistence of all religions practised in India and paintings portraying history in various provinces is situated on the fifth floor. The various forms of the Goddess Shakti can be seen on the sixth floor, whilst the seventh floor is devoted to all incarnations of Vishnu. The eighth floor holds the shrine of Shiva.

The temple was built under the former Shankaracharya Maha-Mandleshwar Swami Satyamitranand Giri Maharaj. Since the inception of the Swami Satyamitranand foundation in 1998, several other branches have been opened, namely in Renukut, Jabalpur, Jodhpur, Indore, and Ahmedabad. It is presently under The Junapeethadheesh, Acharya Shree Mahamandaleshwar Swami Avdheshanand Giri Ji Maharaj.

=== Piran Kaliyar ===
Piran Kaliyar Sharif, built by Ibrahim Lodhi, a ruler of Delhi, is the 'Dargah' of Hazrat Alauddin Sabir Kaliyari, a 13th-century Sufi saint of the Chishti Order (also known as Sarkar Sabir Pak), in Kaliyar village, 7 km (4.3 mi) from Roorkee. It is visited by devotees from all over the world during the annual 'Urs' festival, which is celebrated from the 1st day of sighting the moon to the 16th day of Rabi al-awwal month in the Islamic calendar.

=== Other temples and ashrams ===
Dudhadhari Barfani Temple, part of the ashram of Dudhadhari Barfani Baba, was constructed from shining white marble and honours Rama-Sita and Hanumana.Sureshvari Devi Temple, a temple dedicated to the goddess Sureshwari, is situated in the middle of Rajaji National Park, and thus is only accessible with permission from forest rangers. Pawan Dham is a modern temple made entirely of glass pieces, which is now a tourist destination.

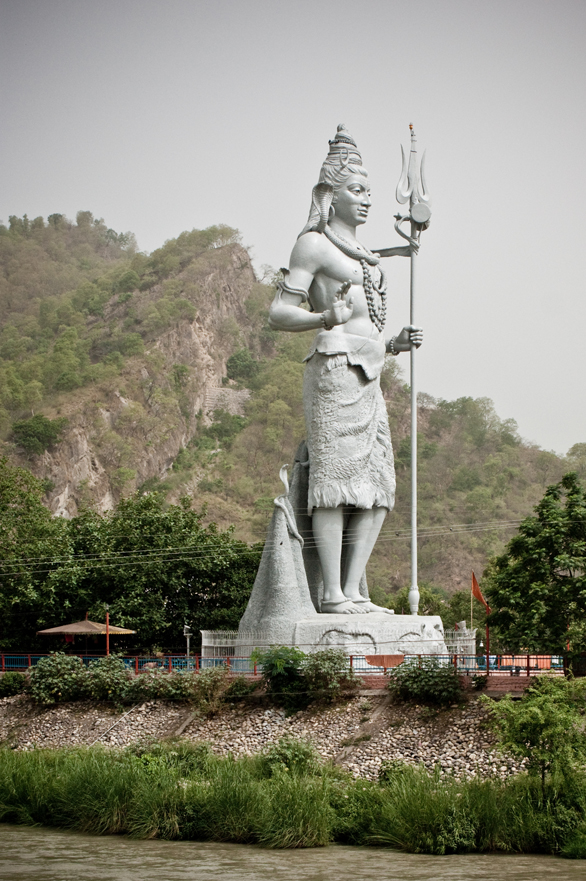
Shiva statue by the Ganges, across Har-ki-Pauri, Haridwar

One of the most sacred temples in Haridwar is Tirupati Balaji Mandir. The temple, which is built in the Dravidian architectural style, is located 4.5 km (2.8 mi) away from Har Ki Pauri. It is a major pilgrimage centre of Haridwar in Uttarakhand. The image of the temple deity represents both Vishnu and Shiva ( Vishnu is considered as the preserver whereas Shiva is considered as the destroyer in Hindu religion).

Sapt Rishi Ashram at Sapt Sarovar, near the bank of the Ganga, is a meditation and yoga centre. The Ashram, established in 1943 by Guru Goswami Dutt, provides lodging, meals and free education for poor kids. Sapt Rishi Ashram, as its name would suggest, was the place where seven sages, namely Kashyapa, Vashisht, Atri, Vishwamitra, Jamadagi, Bharadwaja and Gautam, meditated. As per the mythological records, when all the sages were meditating, they were disturbed by the gushing sound of river Ganges. Annoyed and irritated due to sound, all seven of them were trapped in the flow of the river. Later, Ganges River splits into seven water streams so there is less noise. Those seven river streams are now known as Sapt Sarovar, and the point where the seven sages meditated is called as Saptrishi Ashram.

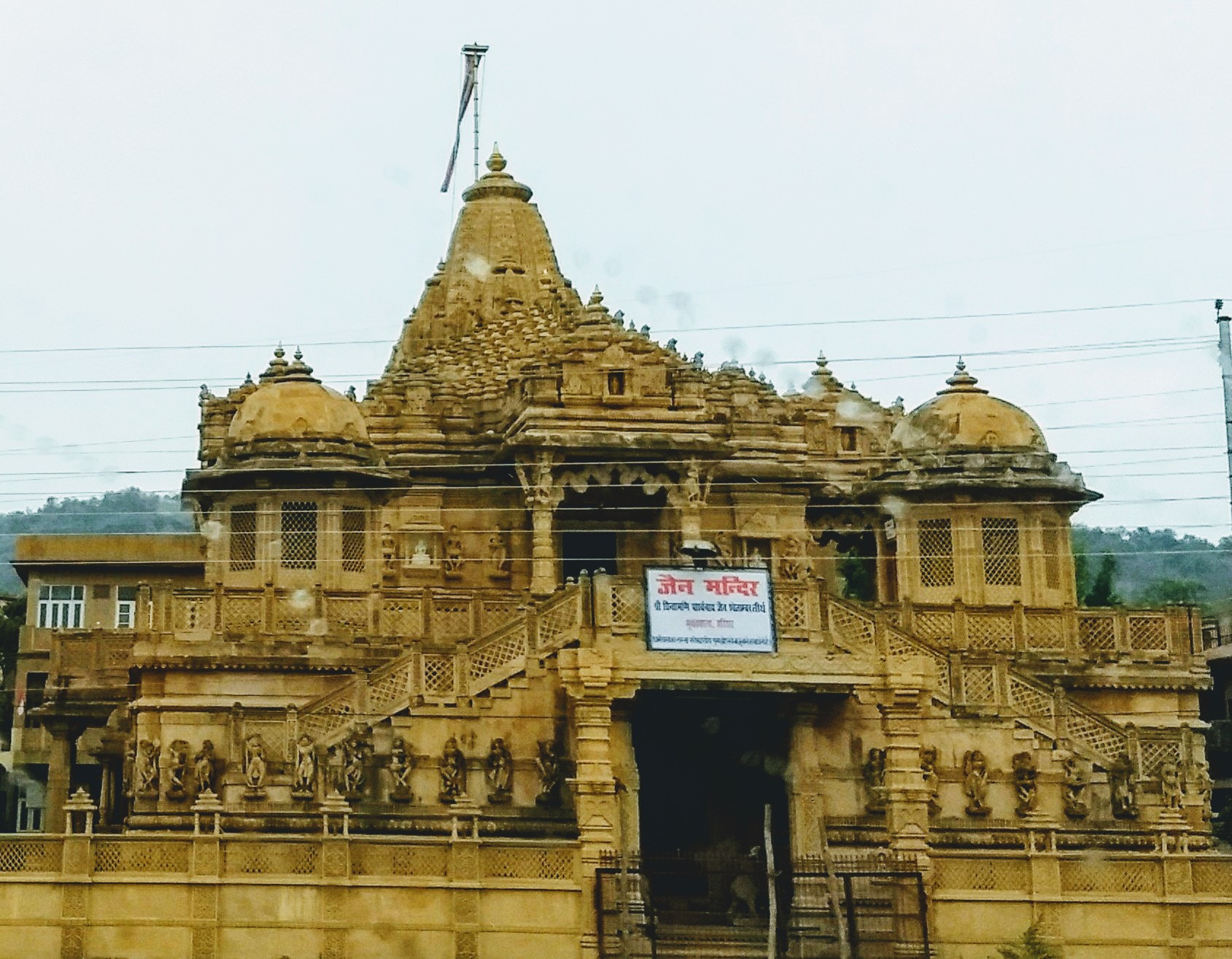
Shri Chintamani Parshwnath Jain Shwetambar Mandir

In the Harihar Ashram, Kankhal, the Parad Shivalinga (Mercury Shivalinga) weighing about 150 kg and a Rudraksha tree are the main attractions for pilgrims and tourists. The Ramanand Ashram, situated in the Shravan Nath Nagar district near the railway station, is the main ashram of Ramanand Sampraday in Haridwar. The Uma Maheswar Sanyas Ashram lies on the banks of the Ganga, in Bairagi Camp; while the Anandamayi Maa Ashram is located in Kankhal, one of five sub-cities of Haridwar, and houses the samadhi shrine of Sri Anandamoyi Ma (1896–1982), a noted saint of India. Ramakrishna Mission Sevashrama, Kankhal was established in 1901 by a monastic disciple of Swami Vivekananda. Shantikunj is the headquarters of the spiritual and social organisation All World Gayatri Pariwar (AWGP) established by Pandit Shriram Sharma Acharya. Located six km (3.7 mi) from Haridwar railway station, at the bank of the Ganges and under the Shivalik Himalayas, it is a place of attraction for tourists as well as seekers of spiritual guidance.

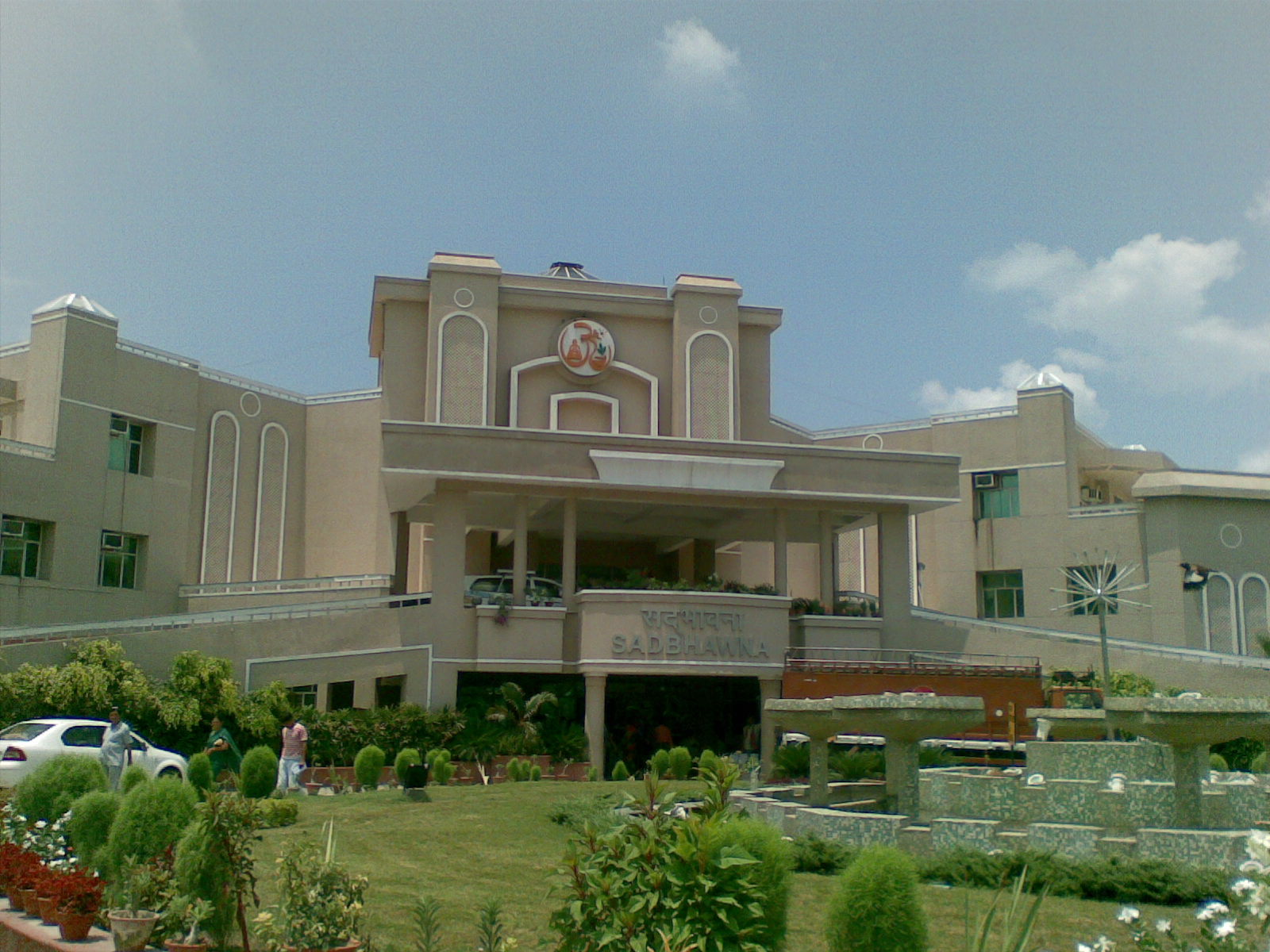
Pantanjali Yogpeeth

The Shri Chintamani Parshwnath Jain Shwetambar Mandir was built in 1990 by Jain saint Shri Padam Sagar Suri. This temple is built by Jaisalmer stone in Jain architectural style. Moolnayak of this temple is a black coloured idol of Chintamani Parshwnath Bhagwan in Padmasan posture. Idols of Shri Parshv Yaksha and Mata Padmawati on both sides of the main idol. There is also an idol of Rishabhanatha made up of white marble. There is small temple of Shri Ghantakaran Mahavir Ji and charan-paduka's (foot imprints) near this temple. The temple also has a dharmshala for accommodation of around 1000 pilgrims at a time.

The Patanjali Yogpeeth is situated in Haridwar-Delhi Highway. This is a yoga institution and research centre of Swami Ramdev. Every day thousands of people come here for yoga and other purposes. The Ramakrishna Math and Ramakrishna Mission Sevashrama is a branch of the worldwide Ramakrishna Movement. The Mission centre was founded in 1901, and the Math centre was started in 1980. The Math centre conducts daily worship and bhajans, and fortnightly Ramnam Sankirtan.

== Seven holy places (Sapta Puri) ==
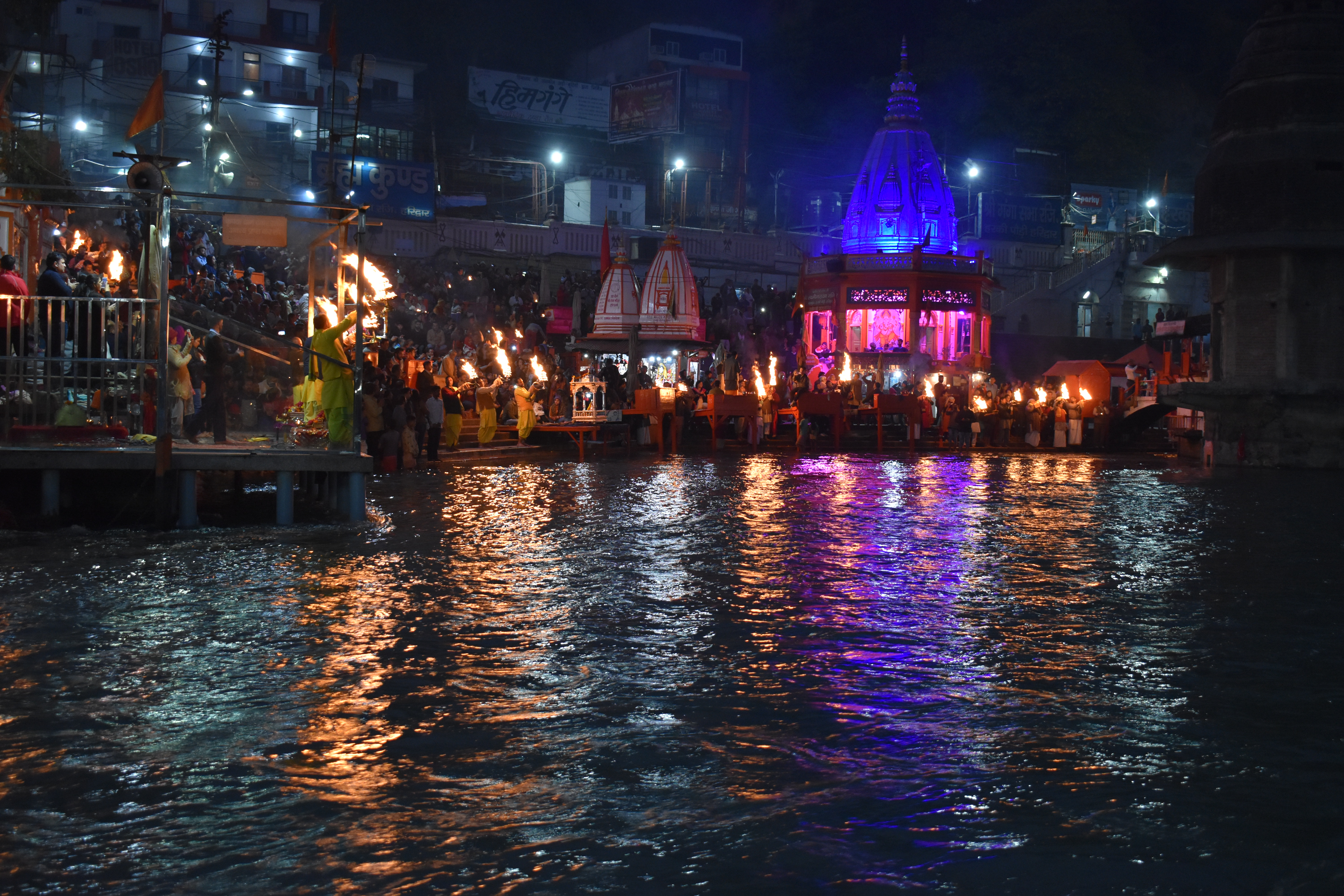
Ganga Aarti at Haridwar

"Ayodhyā Mathurā Māyā Kāśī Kāñcī Avantikā
Purī Dvārāvatī caiva saptaitā mokṣadāyikāḥ" – Garuḍa Purāṇa I XVI .14

Ayodhya, Mathura, Haridwar, Kasi, Kanchi, Avantika and Dwaraka are the seven holy places.

Note the use of the puranic name 'Maya' for Haridwar. As also the inter-change usage of Puri and Dwaraka.

The Garuḍa Purāṇa enumerates seven cities as the giver of Moksha. Haridwar is said to be one of the seven most holy Hindu places (=Kṣetra) in India. A Kṣetra is sacred ground, a field of active power, a place where Moksha, final release can be obtained.

== Culture ==
=== Cuisine ===
In 2002 meat sales were banned in the main city of Haridwar. The ban was upheld by the Supreme Court in 2004. No meat, fish, or eggs are sold within the city limits.

== Educational institutions ==
=== Acharyakulam ===
Situated in Haridwar-Delhi highway, it is the part of Patanjali group. 'Acharyakulam' was inaugurated on 26 April 2013. This is a residential institution.

=== Gurukula Kangri University ===
Situated in Kankhal, at the banks of the river Ganges, Gurukul Kangri University is one of the oldest Universities of India, it was founded in 1902 by Swami Shraddhananda (1856–1926), according to the tenets of Swami Dayananda Saraswati, the founder of Arya Samaj. It has also been visited by British Trade Union leader Charles Freer Andrews and British prime minister, Ramsay MacDonald, to study the unique Gurukul based education system. Here Ancient Vedic and Sanskrit literature, Ayurveda, Philosophy are part of the curriculum besides Modern Sciences and Journalism. Its 'Archaeological Museum', (established 1945) houses some rare statues, coins, paintings, manuscripts, and artefacts, starting from Indus Valley civilisation culture (c. 2500–1500 BCE). Mahatma Gandhi visited the campus three times, and stayed in its sprawling and serene campus for extended periods of time, most notably during the 1915 Kumbh mela, followed by a visit in 1916, when on 20 March, he spoke at Gurukul Anniversary.

=== Dev Sanskriti Vishwavidyalaya ===
Dev Sanskriti Vishwavidyalaya was established in 2002 by the act of the Uttarakhand Government is a fully residential university. Run by Shri Vedmata Gayatri Trust, Shantikunj, Haridwar (headquarters of All World Gayatri Pariwar), it provides various degree, diploma and certificate courses in areas like Yogic Science, Alternative Therapy, Indian Culture, Tourism, Rural Management, Theology, Spiritual Counseling, etc. It also provides courses through distance learning.

=== Uttarakhand Sanskrit University ===
Set up by the Government of Uttarakhand, the university is dedicated to studies of ancient Sanskrit scriptures and books. It also has a curriculum covering ancient Hindu rituals, culture, and tradition, and boasts of a building inspired by ancient Hindu architecture style.

=== Chinmaya Degree College ===
Situated in Shivalik Nagar, 10 km (6.2 mi) from Haridwar city. one of the science colleges in Haridwar.

=== Sheel Institute ===
Situated in Shivalik Nagar, 10 km (6.2 mi) from Haridwar city. one of the Best Computer Institute in Haridwar. Sheel Institute Branches is Ranipur More, Navoday Nagar & Shivalik Nagar

=== HEC PG College ===
It was established in the year 2002. HEC College provides Undergraduate, Postgraduate, PG diploma courses. The courses are in the field of commerce, Management, Science, Lib. Science and Arts and it is affiliated to HNB Garhwal University, Sri Nagar, Garhwal, and Sri Dev Suman Uttarakhand University, Badshahithol, Tehri Garhwal.

=== Other colleges ===
There are two State Ayurvedic College & Hospital in Haridwar, one is Rishikul State Ayurvedic College (has PG level courses) and the other is Gurukul Ayurvedic College.

=== Other schools ===
- Delhi Public School, Haridwar
- The Wisdom Global School, Haridwar
- Kendriya Vidyalaya, B.H.E.L. Haridwar
- DAV Central Public School, Jagjeetpur
- Achievers Home Public School, Jagjeetpur
- Children Foundation Academy, Haridwar
- Shivedale School, Jagjeetpur
- BML Munjal Green Medows School, Bahadarabad, Haridwar

== Important areas within the city ==
B.H.E.L., Ranipur Township The campus of Bharat Heavy Electricals Limited, a Maharatna Public Sector Undertaking (PSU) is spread across an area of 12 km^{2} (4.6 sq mi). The main factory consists of two divisions: the Heavy Electricals Equipment Plant (HEEP), and the Central Foundry Forge Plant (CFFP). Together they employ over 8000 skilled employees. The campus is divided into six sectors providing excellent residential, schooling and medical facilities.

Bahadrabad – 7 km (4.3 mi) It is located on the Haridwar–Delhi National Highway at a distance of 7 km (4.3 mi) from Haridwar. Close by, in village Pathri, lies the Bhimgoda Barrage built on the Upper Ganges Canal in 1955. It also has a block development office responsible for many developed villages (e.g. Khedli, Kisanpur Rohalki, Atmalpur Bongla, Sitapur, Alipur, Salempur).

SIDCUL – 5 km (3.1 mi) A massive industrial area, spread over 2,034 acres (823 ha), developed by State Industrial Development Corporation of Uttarakhand (SIDCUL), a state government body. With the arrival of big enterprises like ITC, Hindustan Unilever Limited, Dabur, Mahindra & Mahindra, Havells and Kirby, SIDCUL is set to develop into another industrial township within the city. three km (1.9 mi) away from the Delhi-Hardwar National Highway, SIDCUL lies adjacent to the BHEL Township, an important Public Sector township.

Shivalik Nagar One of the newest and biggest residential areas of Haridwar. It is divided into various clusters. It was originally developed as a residential colony for BHEL employees, but with the advent of SIDCUL, population and financial activity has grown rapidly in the area due to its proximity.

== Transport ==
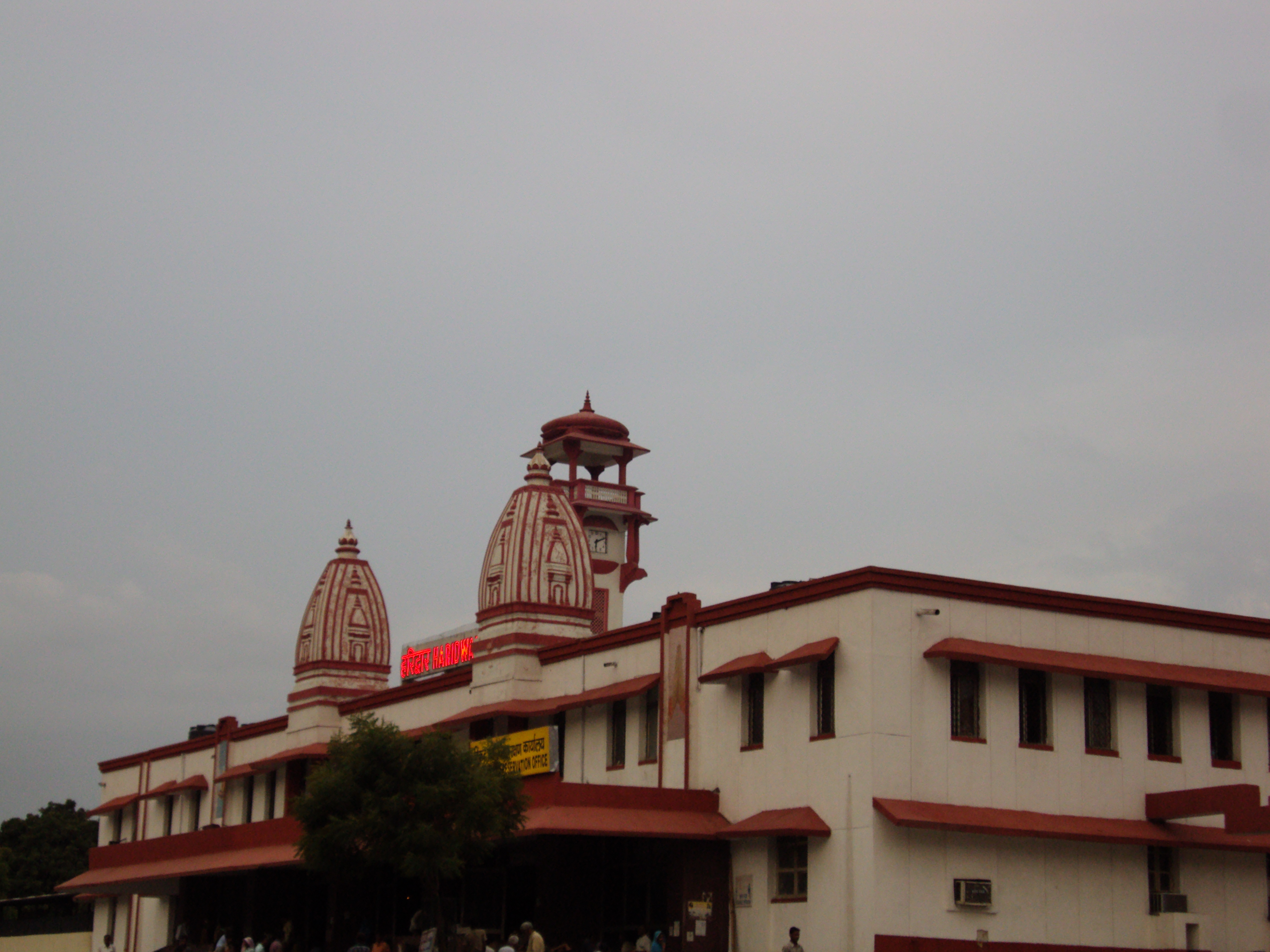
Haridwar Railway station

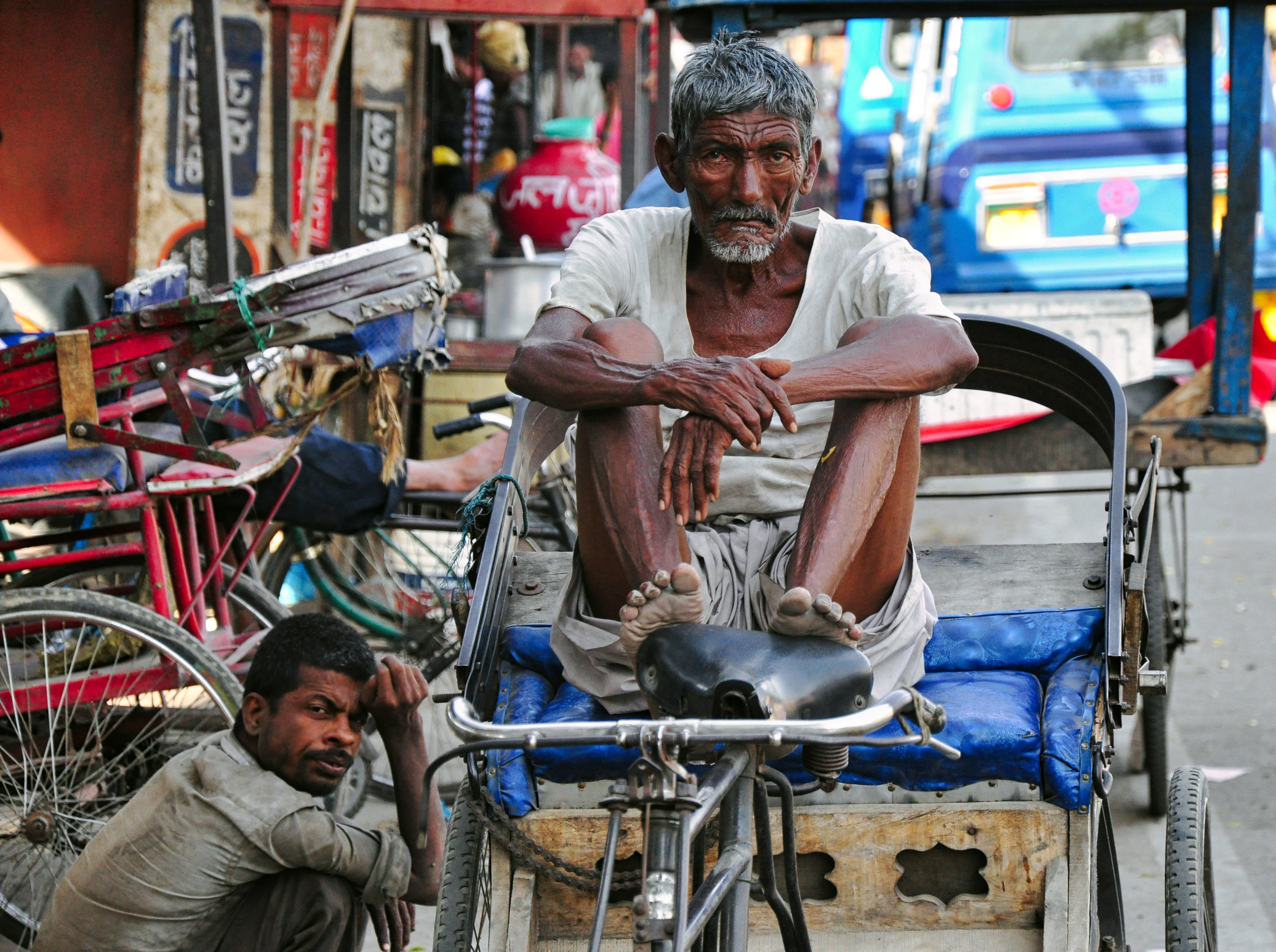
Rickshaw drivers in Haridwar

Haridwar is headquarters of Haridwar district and it has good connectivity with the other towns of the district and the state.

=== Road ===
National Highway 58, between Delhi and Mana Pass passes through Haridwar connecting it with Ghaziabad, Meerut, Muzzafarnagar, Roorkee and Badrinath and National Highway 74 originating from Haridwar connects it with Najibabad, Kashipur, Kichha, Nagina, Pilibhit and Bareilly. Haridwar is well connected to all major cities by bus. Buses from Delhi to Haridwar are available daily, more than 150 buses are available.

=== Rail ===
The Haridwar Railway Station located in Haridwar is under the control of the Northern Railway zone of the Indian Railways. It has direct links the major cities of India such as Kolkata, Delhi, Mumbai, Thiruvananthapuram, Chennai, Gorakhpur, Muzaffarpur, Madgaon, Jaipur, Jodhpur, Ahmedabad, Patna, Gaya, Varanasi, Allahabad, Bareilly, Lucknow, Puri, and major cities of Central India namely Bhopal, Ujjain, Indore, Khandwa, Itarsi.

=== Air ===
The nearest domestic airport is Jolly Grant Airport in Dehradun which is located 35 km (22 mi) from Haridwar. Indira Gandhi International Airport in New Delhi is the nearest International Airport which is located 220 km (140 mi) from Haridwar.

== Industry ==
Haridwar is rapidly developing as an important industrial township of Uttarakhand since the state government agency, SIIDCUL established in 2002, set up the Integrated Industrial Estate in a district attracting many important industrial houses which are setting up manufacturing facilities in the area. According to list of allottee provided by SIIDCUL, the industrial estate is home to over 650 companies currently.

Haridwar has an industrial area situated at the bypass road, comprising mainly ancillary units to PSU, BHEL, which was established here in 1964 and currently employs over 8000 people.

== Notable people ==
- Pilot Baba
- Hans Ji Maharaj
- Satpal Maharaj
- Prem Rawat
- Urvashi Rautela
- Charles Orman
- Ernest Burdett
- Rishabh Pant
- Narender Pal Singh
- Beatrice Harrison
- Louisa Durrell
- John Duncan Grant
- Usha Verma
- Vijay Bose
- Naresh Bedi
- Raza Ali Abidi
- Krishna Chandra Sharma
- Unwan Chishti
- Shriya Saran
- Kunwar Pranav Singh
- Ram Dayal Singh

== In art and literature ==
Besides Hurdwar, a Place of Hindoo Pilgrimage referred to above, an engraving of a painting entitled Hurdwar, The Gate of Vishnou. by William Purser with a poetical illustration by Letitia Elizabeth Landon was published in Fisher's Drawing Room Scrap Book, 1838.

== See also ==
- Ahilyabai Holkar
- Gadaria
- Garhwali people
- Gurjars
- Tyagis
