= Vijay Bose =

Indian theatre director and actor (1927–2014)

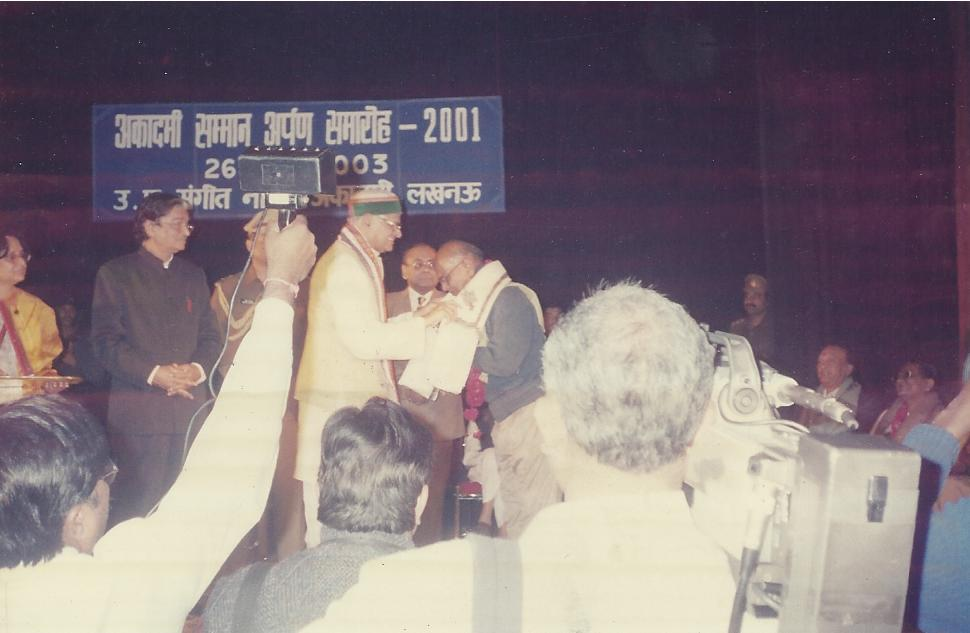
- Vijay Bose accepting Academy samman −2001 from the then Governor of UP Acharya Vishnu Kant Shastri jie
- Born: 21 September 1927; Haridwar, British India
- Died: 17 February 2014 (aged 86); Prayagraj, India
- Occupations: theatre director, actor
- Employer: All India Radio
- Organization(s): North Indian Theatrical Association (NITA), established 1949

Vijay Bose (21 September 1927 – 17 February 2014) was an Indian theatre director and actor, who also served at All India Radio (AIR), Prayagraj (formerly Allahabad) from 1949 till his retirement in 1989, and is known for his radio plays and children's programmes like Bal Sangh and Aao Bachchon, where did the role of Bade Bhaiya (Elder brother), which later became his nickname. He formed his theatre group, North Indian Theatrical Association (NITA) in 1949, with the help of some radio artistes, where not just acted but also went on directplays written by playwrights like Sharat Chandra Chatterji, Rabindranath Tagore, Kamaleshwar and Upendra Nath 'Ashk'.

== Early life ==
Vijay Bose was born in Haridwar. His father Late H. D. Bose was a Station Master. His mother was a house wife. Due to not having any interest in studies, he left his parents place for a livelihood at Lyallpur, now Faisalabad in Pakistan, and joined as a Fitter in Lyallpur Cotton Mill, where off time he participated in extracurricular activities in the cotton mill's recreation club. There he was with Sh. O. P. Sharma (Mantriji) director of the dramatic club. From that place he was bitten by the bug of dramatics.

== Career ==
After he came back from Layallpur he auditioned in Lucknow All India Radio as Drama Voice in 1947 and got selected in very first attempt. At Lucknow after participating in many radio plays for about two years as a casual artist. In 1949 when Allahabad All India Radio Station was established the then Asstt. Station Director Sh. Sunil Bose ji called him here at Allahabad and Vijay Bose Joined as a permanent staff artist.

Bose served AKASVANI Allahabad for 40 years. In his 40 years stay at Akaswani Allahabad many famous poets and play writers such as Pt. Sumitra Nandan Pant, Dr. Ram Kumar Verma, Girja Kumar Mathur, Upendra Nath Ashk, Amrit Lal Nagar, Mahadevi Verma, Dr. H. R. Bachchan, Cine Actor Prithviraj Kapur Ji & C V Rao etc. had praised Vijay Bose from time to time for his voice texture and directing ability.

During his 40 years tenure of Akashvani Allahabad, he participated and directed about 1500 plays and also ably handled Children's Programme BALSANGH from there he was famous as `BARE BHAIYA’. Apart from his day to day AKASVANI job he also established a drama troupe in Allahabad city in 1950, its name was North Indian Theatrical Association. He directed many famous plays like `Biraj Bahu’, `Anarkali’,`Alagh Alagh Raste’ `Bhartendu Harishchandra’, `Adhuri Awaj’, & `Parda Uthao parda girao’

During 40 years tenure of AKASVANI Allahabad and the North Indian Theatrical Association period few names are mentioned here who ably associated with Vijay Bose ‘Bare Bhaiya’ – Sri. Kaushal Bihari Lal, Sri. K.B. Lal, Smt. Shobha Berry (VOA), Chandramohan Sharma (UP Sangeet Natak Academy), Sri. Raja Zutshi, Sri. Palok Bose (retired justice), Late Devbrata Dixit (ex-commissioner Mirjapur), Sri. Ram Chandra Gupta, Dr. Niraj Tripathi etc.

== Personal life and death ==
Vijay Bose was married to Aparna. They had two sons; Kamal and Sanjai, and two daughters; Keya and Kuhu.

Bose died in Prayagraj on 17 February 2014, at the age of 86.

== Awards ==
- UP Sangeet Natak Academy (Lucknow, 2001)
- Bengali, social & cultural Association (Allahabad, 2003)
- Vishwa Ranga Mancha Divas (Samman-NCZCC, 2011)
