= Bhimgoda Barrage =

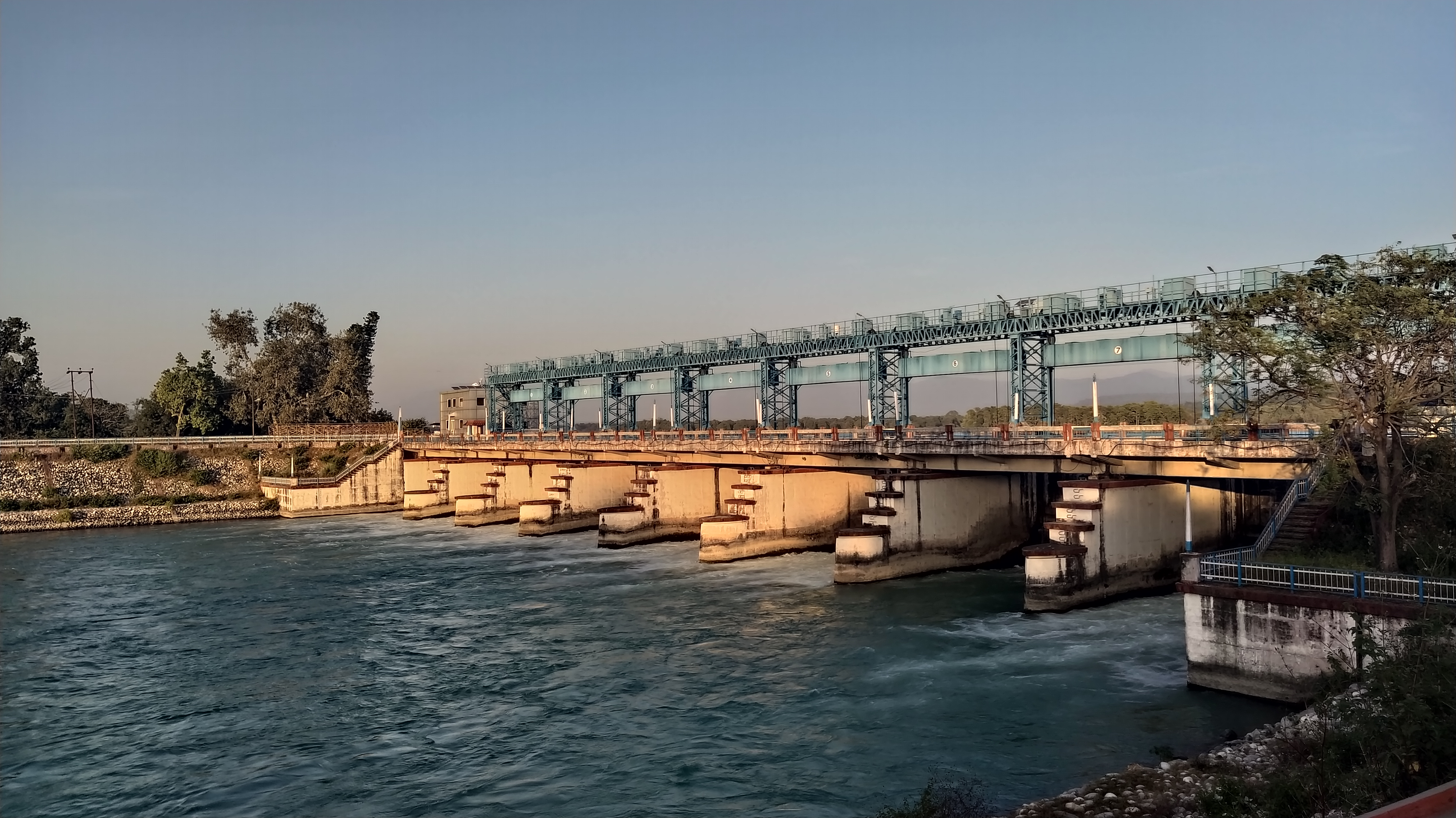

- Location within Uttarakhand
- Country: India
- Location: Haridwar
- Coordinates: 29°57′23″N 78°10′49″E
- Status: Operational
- Construction began: 1979
- Opening date: 1983

Dam and spillways
- Length: 454 m (1,490 ft)
- Spillway capacity: 19,300 m^{3}/s (681,573 cu ft/s)

Reservoir
- Catchment area: 23,000 km^{2} (8,880 mi^{2})

Power Station
- Operator: Uttaranchal Jal Vidyut Nigam Ltd.
- Commission date: Pathri: 1955; Mohammadpur: 1952
- Turbines: Pathri: 3 x 6.8 MW Kaplan-type; Mohammadpur: 3 x 3.1 MW Kaplan-type
- Installed capacity: Pathri: 20.4 MW; Mohammadpur: 9.3 MW

The Bhimgoda Barrage, also referred to as the Bhimgoda Weir or Bhimgoda Head Works, is a barrage on the Ganges River at Har ki Pauri near Haridwar in Haridwar district, Uttarakhand, India. Built as the headworks of the Upper Ganges Canal, an initial barrage was completed by 1854 and replaced twice; the final one completed in 1983. The primary purpose for the barrage is irrigation but it also serves to provide water for hydroelectric power production and control floods. The area behind the barrage is known as the Neel Dhara Bird Sanctuary and is a popular destination for various waterbirds and tourists.

== Background ==
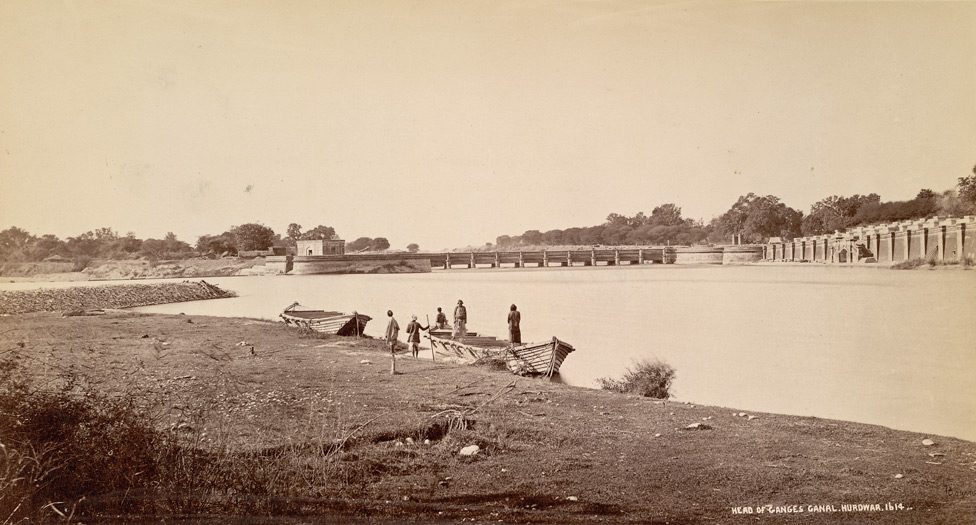
View of Bhimgoda Barrage, the headworks of the Ganges Canal in Haridwar, 1860.

The initial barrage was constructed between 1840 and 1854 to supply the Upper Ganges Canal with water and control flooding. This was done during a significant period of infrastructure development in India. Lord Dalhousie, the Governor-General of India at the time inaugurated the project. A permanent barrage was later erected 3 km (2 mi) upstream of the barrage between 1913 and 1920 to support the canal better. A new barrage was constructed downstream between 1979 and 1983 to replace the older barrage upstream. The Pathri and Mohanpur Mohammadpur Power Plants along the canal's length were commissioned in 1955 and 1952, respectively.

== Design and operation ==
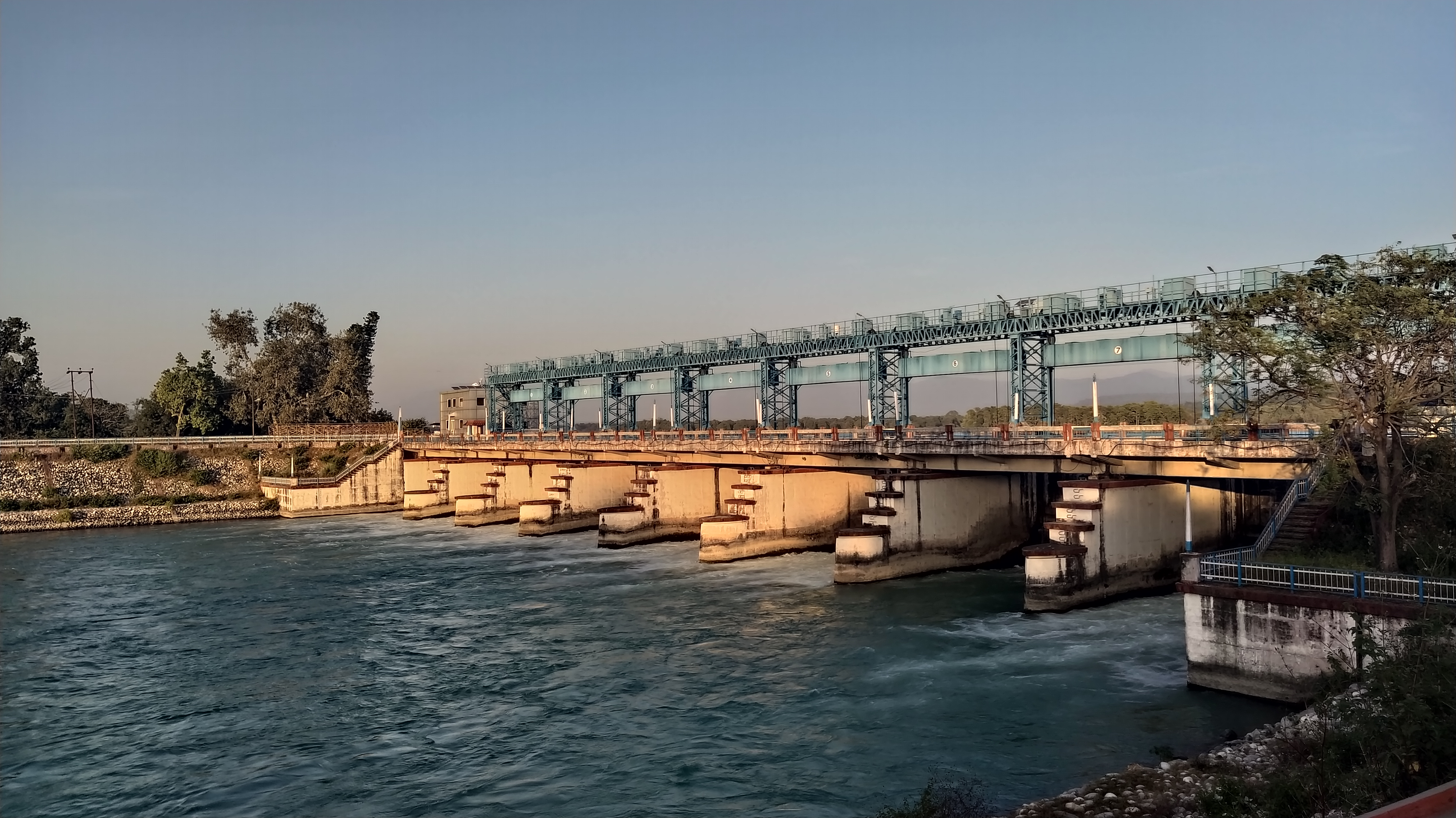
Diversion towards Har-Ki-Paudi

The barrage is 455 m (1,493 ft) long and sits at the head of a 23,000 km^{2} (8,880 mi^{2}) catchment area. It contains 15 spillways gates and 7 under-sluice gates, all 18 m (59 ft) wide. The flood discharge of the barrage is 19,300 m^{3}/s (681,573 cu ft/s). Adjacent to it, on the right bank of the river, the barrage diverts water into the Upper Ganges Canal. The canal system is immense, consisting of 6,450 km (4,008 mi) of main canal and branches, providing irrigation for up to 2,023,000 ha (4,998,942 acres). At a distance of 13 km (8 mi) down the main canal, water reaches the 20.4 MW Pathri Power Plant at 29°42′12″N 77°51′38″E. It contains three 6.8 MW Kaplan turbine-generators and has a design hydraulic head of 9.75 m (32 ft). Further down the main canal, and south of Manglaur, is the 9.3 MW Mohammadpur Power Plant at 29°42′12″N 77°51′38″E. It contains three 3.1 MW Kaplan turbine-generators and has a design head of 5.79 m (19 ft). The design discharge of both power plants is about 255 m^{3}/s (9,005 cu ft/s). Although both power plants are owned by Uttaranchal Jal Vidyut Nigam Ltd., canal flows are regulated by the Uttar Pradesh Irrigation Department.

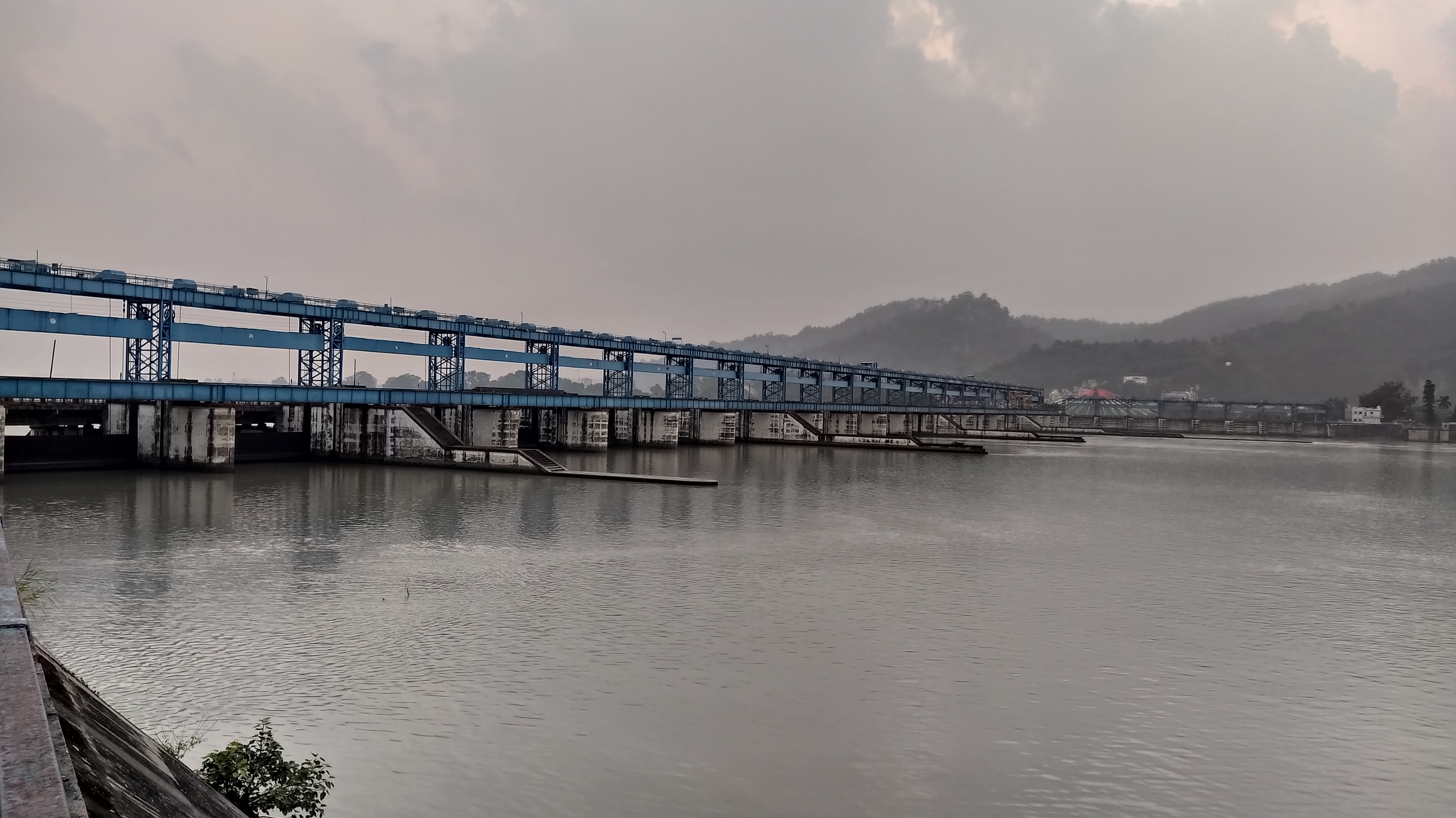
Bhimgoda Barrage as seen from Chilla Road.

== See also ==
- Proby Cautley - engineer of the Ganges Canal
