= Haridwar in scriptures =

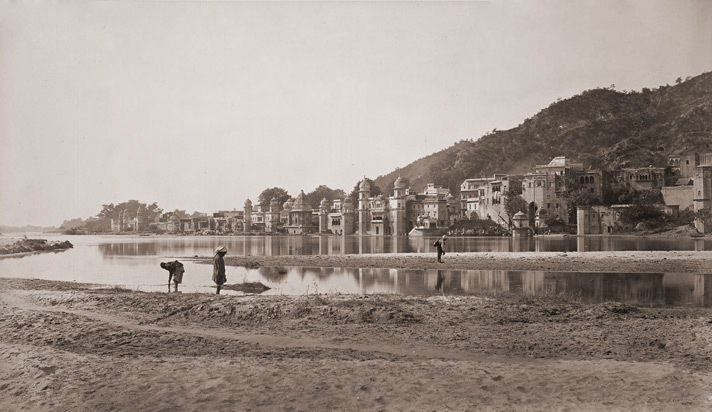
Haridwar from opposite bank of the Ganges, 1866

Haridwar (Hindi: हरिद्वार) finds mention in numerous scriptures (religious texts) and manuscripts of antiquity, as well as in various historical texts of the recent past. Its significance is also enhanced by the fact that it has been hosting, the famous Kumbh Mela, every 12 years, since time immemorial, wherein thousands of people from all over the country take part, and with whom many stories of its stories have travelled far and wide, and survived in distant lands as a part of the collective oral history of the city.

The city has been mentioned by its various names, which signify its ever-changing milieu, be it one of its ancient names, Gangadwar (गंगाद्वार), the 'Gateway of the Ganges' or its transition to the recent name of Hardwar, which finally gave way to the modern name of this city, Haridwar.

Also find mention are the neighbouring areas of Kankhal (कनखल) and Mayapur (मायापुर), and in some places along with other Panch Tirthas in the region, namely - Gangadwara, Kushwart, Kankhal, Bilwa Teerth (Mansa Devi Temple) and Neel Parvat (Chandi Devi Temple), all of which, lie within the present municipal city of Haridwar.

== Ancient scriptures ==
=== Devi Bhagavata Purana ===
- "Kamarupa, Hardwar (Haridwar), Kedara, Matripura (in Sahyadri mountains), the banks of the river Saraswati, the holy land Brindaban, Godavari, Kausiki (Koshi River), Triveni (Allahabad), and the Himalayas are all famous places of pilgrimages. Those who willingly accept gifts in these sacred places are said to be Tirthapratigrahis (the acceptors of the gifts in the Tirtha). These Tirthaprathigrahis go in the end to Kumbhipaka hell."

-- Devi Bhagavata Purana, The Ninth Book, Chapter XXXIV: On the description of the various hells, p. 939.

=== Ramayana ===
At the gates of Gangá (Gangadwara)
Daksha held his feast;
Called the gods unto it,
Greatest as the least.
- Valmiki Ramayana, Ravan Doomed, Section XIII. 545:2.

=== Mahabharata ===
- Bhishma recounts ‘Gangadwara’ as ‘a scared spot on earth’, to Vaisampayana
  - The Mahabharata, Anusasana Parva: Section CLXV
- "O Lord of earth, Gangadwara, and the well-known woods of Saindhava which are sacred and inhabited by the regenerate ones."
  - The Mahabharata, Vana Parva: Tirtha-yatra Parva: Section LXXXIX

"Bathing in Gangadwara (Haridwar) and Kusavarta...as also in Kankhala, one is sure to become cleansed of all one's sins and then ascend to heaven."
-- The Mahabharata, Book 13: Anusasanika Parva: Section XXV, p. 130.

- O Yudhishthira, the spot where Ganga rusheth past, cleaving the foremost of mountains which is frequented by Gandharvas and Yakshas and Rakshasas and Apsaras, and inhabited by hunters, and Kinnaras, is called Gangadwara. O king, Sanatkumara regardeth that spot visited by Brahmarshis, as also the Tirtha Kanakhala (that is near to it), as sacred.
  - The Mahabharata, Vana Parva: Tirtha-yatra Parva: Section XC..
- Agastya Rishi did penance at Gangadwara, with the help of his dutiful wife, Lopamudra (the princess of Vidharba).
  - The Mahabharata, Book 3: Vana Parva: Tirtha-yatra Parva: Section XCVII

=== Vayu Purana ===
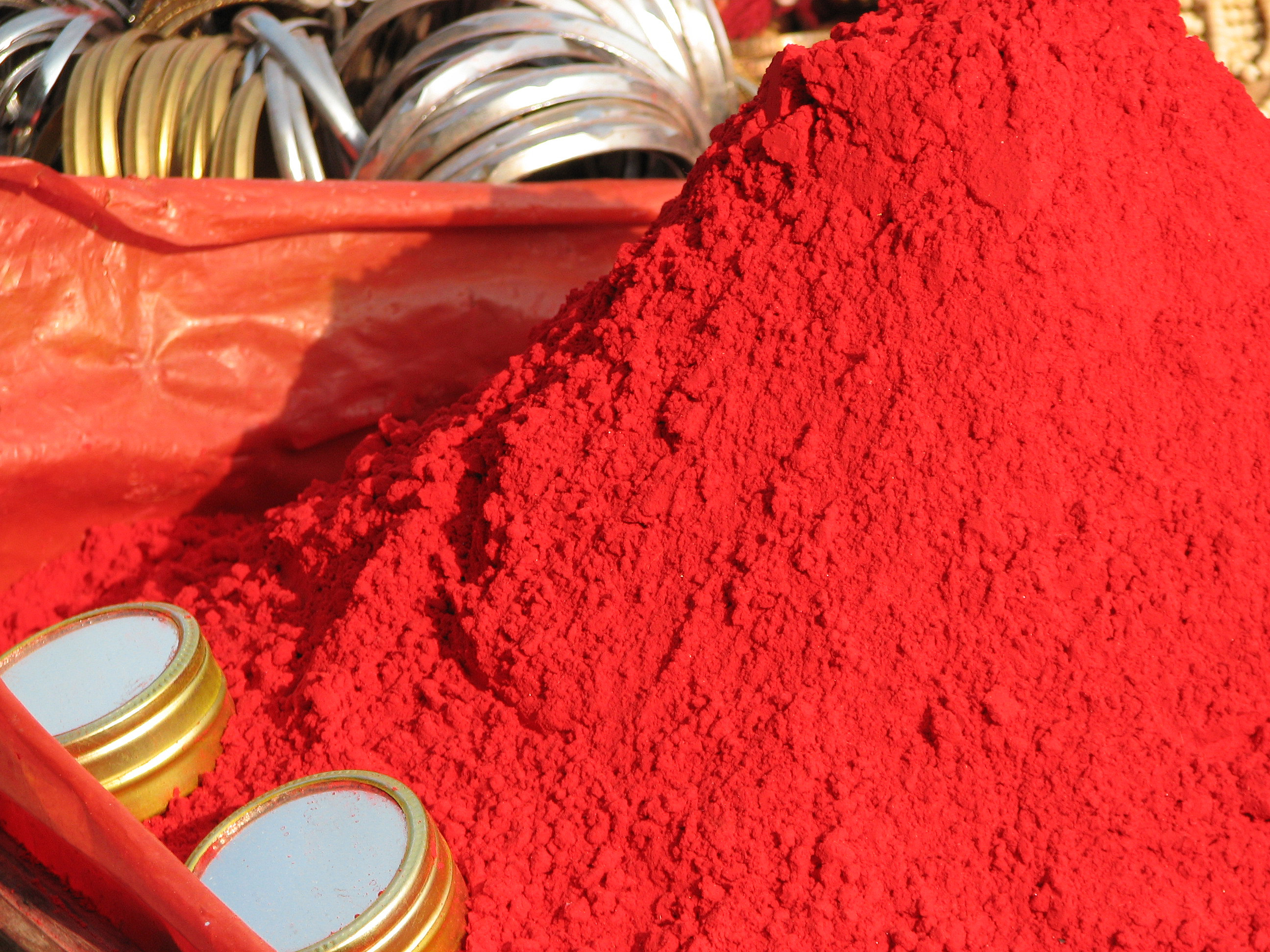
Sindoor powder (vermilion) popular amongst pilgrims to the city.

- Sacrifice of Daksha - "In former times, Daksha commenced a holy sacrifice on the side of Himaván, at the sacred spot Gangadwara, frequented by the Rishis. The gods, desirous of assisting at this solemn rite, came, with Indra at their head, to Mahadeva, and intimated their purpose; and having received his permission, departed in their splendid chariots to Gangadwára, as tradition reports.” - Vayu Purana, p. 62.

=== Nilamata Purana ===
98-99. 0 king, (he visited also) the Bhrgutunga, the Visala, Kubjamra, the Raivataka, Kus'avarta at Gangadvara, Bilvaka, the mountain Nila, the holy place Kanakhala and other sacred places.
