= Shivalik =

Shivalik may refer to:

- Siwalik Hills, a series of ranges of outer foothills of Himalaya crossing Pakistan, India, Nepal, and Bhutan
- Shivalik class frigate, a class of multi-role stealth frigates in service with the Indian Navy
  - INS Shivalik (F47), first stealth warship built for India
- Project Shivalik, a project of the Border Roads Organisation in the Indian State of Uttarakhand.

== See also ==
- Shivalik Enclave, a town in Haryana, India
- Shivalik Fossil Park, a fossil park in Saketi, India
- Shivalik Nagar, Haridwar, city in Uttarakhand, India
