= Jwalapur railway station =

Railway station in Uttarakhand, India

Jwalapur

General information
- Location: Karch Road, Nandpuri, Jwalapur, Haridwar district, Uttarakhand; India
- Coordinates: 29.928457°N 78.120775°E
- Elevation: 291 metres (955 ft)
- System: Indian Railways station
- Owner: Indian Railways
- Operator: Indian Railways
- Line: Laksar–Dehradun line
- Platforms: 3
- Tracks: broad gauge

Construction
- Structure type: Standard (on ground)

Other information
- Status: Functioning
- Station code: JWP
- Zone(s): NR
- Division(s): Moradabad

Services
Preceding station	Indian Railways	Following station
Ikkar towards ?	Northern Railway zone Pune–Miraj–Londa line	Haridwar towards ?
Location
- Interactive map

Jwalapur railway station is a railway station located on the Laksar–Dehradun railway line operated by the Northern Railway zone under Moradabad railway division. It is situated beside Karch Road at Nandpuri, Jwalapur in Haridwar district in the Indian state of Uttarakhand.
