= Aithal railway station =

Railway station in Uttarakhand, India

Aithal

General information
- Location: Aithal Buzurg, Haridwar district, Uttarakhand; India
- Coordinates: 29.80793°N 78.043623°E
- Elevation: 244 metres (801 ft)
- System: Indian Railways station
- Owner: Indian Railways
- Operator: Indian Railways
- Line: Laksar–Dehradun line
- Platforms: 2
- Tracks: broad gauge

Construction
- Structure type: Standard (on ground)

Other information
- Status: Functioning
- Station code: ATMO
- Zone(s): NR
- Division(s): Moradabad

Services
Preceding station	Indian Railways	Following station
Laksar Junction towards ?	Northern Railway zone Pune–Miraj–Londa line	Pathri towards ?
Location
- Interactive map

Aithal railway station is a railway station located on the Laksar–Dehradun railway line operated by the Northern Railway zone under Moradabad railway division. It is situated at Aithal Buzurg in Haridwar district in the Indian state of Uttarakhand.
