= List of municipal corporations in Uttarakhand =

Municipal corporations of Uttarakhand are the local governing bodies of the cities in Uttarakhand. There are 11 such municipal corporations in this Indian state.

== Municipal corporations ==
S/N	City	District	Corporation name	Population (2011)	Voters (2024)	Year of formation as municipality	Year of elevation to municipal corporation	No. of wards
1	Dehradun	Dehradun	Dehradun Municipal Corporation	578,420	7,67,106	1867	1998	100
2	Haridwar	Haridwar	Haridwar Municipal Corporation	225,235	191,963	1868	2011	60
3	Haldwani	Nainital	Haldwani Municipal Corporation	156,060	240,204	1942	2011	60
4	Roorkee	Haridwar	Roorkee Municipal Corporation	118,188	152,128	1868	2013	40
5	Kashipur	Udham Singh Nagar	Kashipur Municipal Corporation	121,610	149,744	1872	2013	40
6	Rudrapur	Udham Singh Nagar	Rudrapur Municipal Corporation	140,884	129,342	1942	2013	40
7	Kotdwar	Pauri Garhwal	Kotdwar Municipal Corporation	28,859	115,976	1952	2017	40
8	Rishikesh	Dehradun	Rishikesh Municipal Corporation	1,04,269	85,872	1952	2017	40
9	Srinagar	Pauri Garhwal	Srinagar Municipal Corporation	37,911	28,616	1890	2021	40
10	Almora	Almora	Almora Municipal Corporation	39,600	15,735	1864	2024	40
11	Pithoragarh	Pithoragarh	Pithoragarh Municipal Corporation	62,500	38,767	1963	2024	40

== Municipal corporation headquarters on map ==
Municipal Corporations of Uttarakhand

== See also ==
- Municipal corporation
- Mayor
- Municipal commissioner
- Local government in India
- Municipal governance in India
- Municipal elections in India
- List of municipal corporations in India
- List of metropolitan areas in India
- List of urban local bodies in Uttarakhand
- List of cities in India by population
- List of cities in Uttarakhand by population
