= Landhaura =

- Town
- Location in Uttarakhand, India Landhaura (India)
- Coordinates: 29.82°N 77.93°E
- Country: India
- State: Uttarakhand
- District: Haridwar

Population (2011)
  - Total: 28,786

Languages
  - Official: Hindi
  - Native: Khariboli
- Time zone: UTC+5:30 (IST)
- PIN: 247664
- Vehicle registration: UK
- Website: uk.gov.in

Landhaura is a town and a nagar panchayat in Haridwar district in the Indian state of Uttarakhand.

== History ==
Gurjars were present in that area earlier than 6th century. They were initially employed as protector of small villages of Doab as to protect the peasants from attacks of war bands of more powerful villages in their neighbourhood.

Later rulers of this region employed them for purpose of police and revenue collection. So after gaining strength and confidence of villagers, Gurjars settled on depopulated sites and even seized some old villages for themselves.

Landhaura estate was established by a Gurjar chieftain of Khubar clan. Khubar a Panwar clan (khubbad = khub + bada p. 38

Najib Khan Rohilla, the Mughal Governor granted rights of revenue collection to Nahar Singh in 1759-60 for this taluqa. After this, more and more Gurjars flocked to Landhaura and were allotted large number of villages, which made Nahar Singh a successful peasant community chief. Under Mughal rule, Gurjars annually exported 12000 to 15000 bullocks out of Saharanpur region, with revenue going to Mughal treasury at Saharanpur.

Over the years Nahar Singh switched his loyalties from Mughals to Sikhs and back to Mughal governor. He was imprisoned by Zabita Khan, his estate divided in half, half given to Gurjar Ranjeet Singh, Nahar Singh's rival. Nahar Singh collaborated with Sikhs to loot cattles in Najibabad region and later joined Mughal governor to drive out Sikhs.

After Nahar Sindh died, his son Ram Dayal Singh became the chief of Landhaura.

In 1804, there was a local rebellion popularly known as Azimgardi, during which Ram Dayal Singh supported East India Company and helped to save their assets and employees.

After death of Ram Dayal in 1813, succession dispute occurred between his grandson Badan Singh and infant son Kushal Singh, from wife Dhan Kunwar. A settlement was reached where Dhan Kunwar paid a large sum of money and expensive goods to Badan Singh and kept Landhaura for her infant son.

In 1824, Vijay Singh Gujar, remote cousin of Ram Dayal, had planned to get rid of Kushal Singh and become head of Gurjars and joined Kallu Gurjar. But his plan didn't succeed as he was soon killed by Gurkhas army of Britishers due to revolution against them.

Kushal Singh died in 1829. Dhan Kunwar died in 1836 and Lad Kunwar (wife of Kushal Singh) died in 1849, leaving her son Harbans Singh. Harbans Singh died in 1850 when he was in his early twenties, survived by infant son Raghubir Singh.

One of dancing songs among the dominant Pahansu Gurjars concerns the Gurjar chief of Landhaura, who was poisoned by his mother so that his mother's brother could rule in the dead son's place. In the song, the chief's wife refers in a veiled and sorrowful way to the murder in addressing her mother-in-law, but the chief's mother denies that the death has even occurred.

== Geography ==
Landhaura is located at 29.82°N 77.93°E.

== Demographics ==
As of 2011 India census, Landhaura had a population of 28786. Males constitute 54% of the population and females 46%. Landhaura has an average literacy rate of 72%, lower than the national average of 73%: male literacy is 82%, and female literacy is 62%. In Landhaura, 22% of the population is under 6 years of age.

Religions in Landhaura
Religion	Percent
Hindus	39%
Muslims	60%
Jains	0.5%
Others†	0.5%
Distribution of religions †Includes Sikhs (0.2%), Buddhists (<0.2%).

== Politics ==
It was an electoral constituency of Uttarakhand Legislative Assembly in Haridwar. Muslims and Hindu Gurjars are electoral votebank and have highest concentration in the constituency district.
