= Bahadrabad =

Bahadurabad
- Town
- Location in Uttarakhand, India Bahadurabad (India)
- Coordinates: 29.96°N 78.16°E
- Country: India
- State: Uttarakhand
- District: Haridwar
- Elevation: 294 m (965 ft)

Languages
  - Official: Hindi, Urdu
  - Native: Khariboli
- Time zone: UTC+5:30 (IST)
- PIN: 249402
- Telephone code: 01334
- Vehicle registration: UK 08
- Website: haridwar.nic.in

Bahadrabad is an intermediate Village Panchayat in the Haridwar district of Uttarakhand, India. It is one of the six development blocks in Haridwar district under which many developed villages come, including Atmalpur Bongla, Rohalki-Kishanpur, Alipur, Garhmeerpur, Khedli, Sitapur.

It was also a Uttarakhand Legislative Assembly constituency in Haridwar district before 2012.

Bahadrabad is situated at a distance of 11 km from Haridwar, between the towns of Haridwar and Roorkee on the National Highway 58, between Delhi and Manna Pass. It is neighbouring towns are, Pathri, Jhabrera, Narsan, Jwalapur and Mohanpur Mohammadpur

== History ==
Bahadrabad, formerly known as Bahadurabad, after the founder of the village Thakur Bahadur Singh, who moved the village from a few miles south and established it at this point after a river turned its course and destroyed the previous settlement. The village was established in the late 19th Century with the temple premises at the heart of the village.

== Education ==
- Uttarakhand Sanskrit University
- Mount Litera, Alipur
- Royal Public School
- Rastriye Inter College
- Bal Sadan Junior high school
- Maa Saraswati Public Sr. Sec. School
- Maa Saraswati Junior High School

== Demographics ==
According to 2011 census total population is 10232.

Religions in Bahadarabad
Religion	Percent
Hindus	50%
Muslims	49%
Jains	0.5%
Others†	0.5%
Distribution of religions †Includes Sikhs (0.2%), Buddhists (<0.2%).

== Irrigation ==
Close by, in village Pathri, lies the Pathri Power Plant on the Upper Ganges Canal, which started in 1955.

Uttarakhand Irrigation Research Institute, founded in 1928 in Lucknow, was shifted here in 1946. Later its research unit in Roorkee was established as a full-fledged institute in 1954. Today, hydraulics model studies are carried out at its Hydraulic Research Station at Bahadrabad.

== Industry ==
Integrated Industrial Estate of the (State Industrial Development Corporation of Uttarankhand) is situated close to Bahadrabad. Bahadrabad also has a small but old industrial setup known as the Bahdrabad Industrial Area, which has Indane Gas Plant and Modern Bread Factory.
