= Maya Devi Temple =

Maya Devi Temple may refer to:

- Maya Devi Temple, Haridwar, a Hindu temple in India
- Maya Devi Temple, Lumbini, a Buddhist temple in Nepal
