= Pathri railway station =

Railway station in Uttarakhand, India

Pathri

General information
- Location: Pathri, Haridwar district, Uttarakhand; India
- Coordinates: 29.851996°N 78.076506°E
- Elevation: 257 metres (843 ft)
- System: Indian Railways station
- Owner: Indian Railways
- Operator: Indian Railways
- Line: Laksar–Dehradun line
- Platforms: 2
- Tracks: broad gauge

Construction
- Structure type: Standard (on ground)

Other information
- Status: Functioning
- Station code: PRI
- Zone(s): NR
- Division(s): Moradabad

Services
Preceding station	Indian Railways	Following station
Aithal towards ?	Northern Railway zone Pune–Miraj–Londa line	Ikkar towards ?
Location
- Interactive map

Pathri railway station is a railway station located on the Laksar–Dehradun railway line operated by the Northern Railway zone under Moradabad railway division. It is situated at Pathri in Haridwar district in the Indian state of Uttarakhand.
