= Uttarakhand Sanskrit University =

- Type: State university, Postgraduate
- Established: 21 April 2005; 21 years ago
- Affiliations: UGC
- Chancellor: Governor of Uttarakhand
- Vice-Chancellor: Ramakant Pandey
- Undergraduates: 170 per batch
- Postgraduates: 480 per batch
- Other students: Certificate: 240 per batch Diploma: 240 per batch
- Location: Haridwar, Uttarakhand, India; 29.921437°N 78.049949°E
- Language: English & Hindi
- Website: usvv.ac.in

Uttarakhand Sanskrit University is an Indian State university located in the city of Haridwar, Uttarakhand. Established in 2005, the university offers certificate courses, diplomas, undergraduate education, postgraduate education, doctoral programmes and master of philosophy courses in various disciplines.

== History ==
Uttarakhand Sanskrit University was established on 21 April 2005 vide act 17 of 2005. The university is situated on NH-58 in village panchayat Bahadrabad in Haridwar district. Forty-four colleges in Uttarakhand are affiliated to Uttarakhand Sanskrit University.

== Faculties ==
Uttarakhand Sanskrit University retains the following six faculties:

- Faculty of Education
- Faculty of Linguistics and Translation
- Faculty of Philosophy
- Faculty of Sahitya
- Faculty of Vyākaraṇa
- Faculty of Adhunik Gyan Vigyan

== See also ==
- University Grants Commission
- List of Sanskrit universities in India
- Sanskrit revival
