= Ikkar railway station =

Railway station in Uttarakhand

Ikkar

General information
- Location: Ikkar, Bahadrabad Block, Haridwar district, Uttarakhand; India
- Coordinates: 29.891989°N 78.099997°E
- Elevation: 272 metres (892 ft)
- System: Indian Railways station
- Owner: Indian Railways
- Operator: Indian Railways
- Line: Laksar–Dehradun line
- Platforms: 2
- Tracks: broad gauge

Construction
- Structure type: Standard (on ground)

Other information
- Status: Functioning
- Station code: IKK
- Zone(s): NR
- Division(s): Moradabad

Services
| Preceding station | Indian Railways | Following station |
|---|---|---|
| Pathri towards ? | Northern Railway zone Pune–Miraj–Londa line | Jwalapur towards ? |
Location
- Interactive map

Ikkar railway station is a railway station located on the Laksar–Dehradun railway line operated by the Northern Railway zone under Moradabad railway division. It is situated at Ikkar, Bahadrabad Block in Haridwar district in the Indian state of Uttarakhand.
