= Shivalik Nagar =

- city
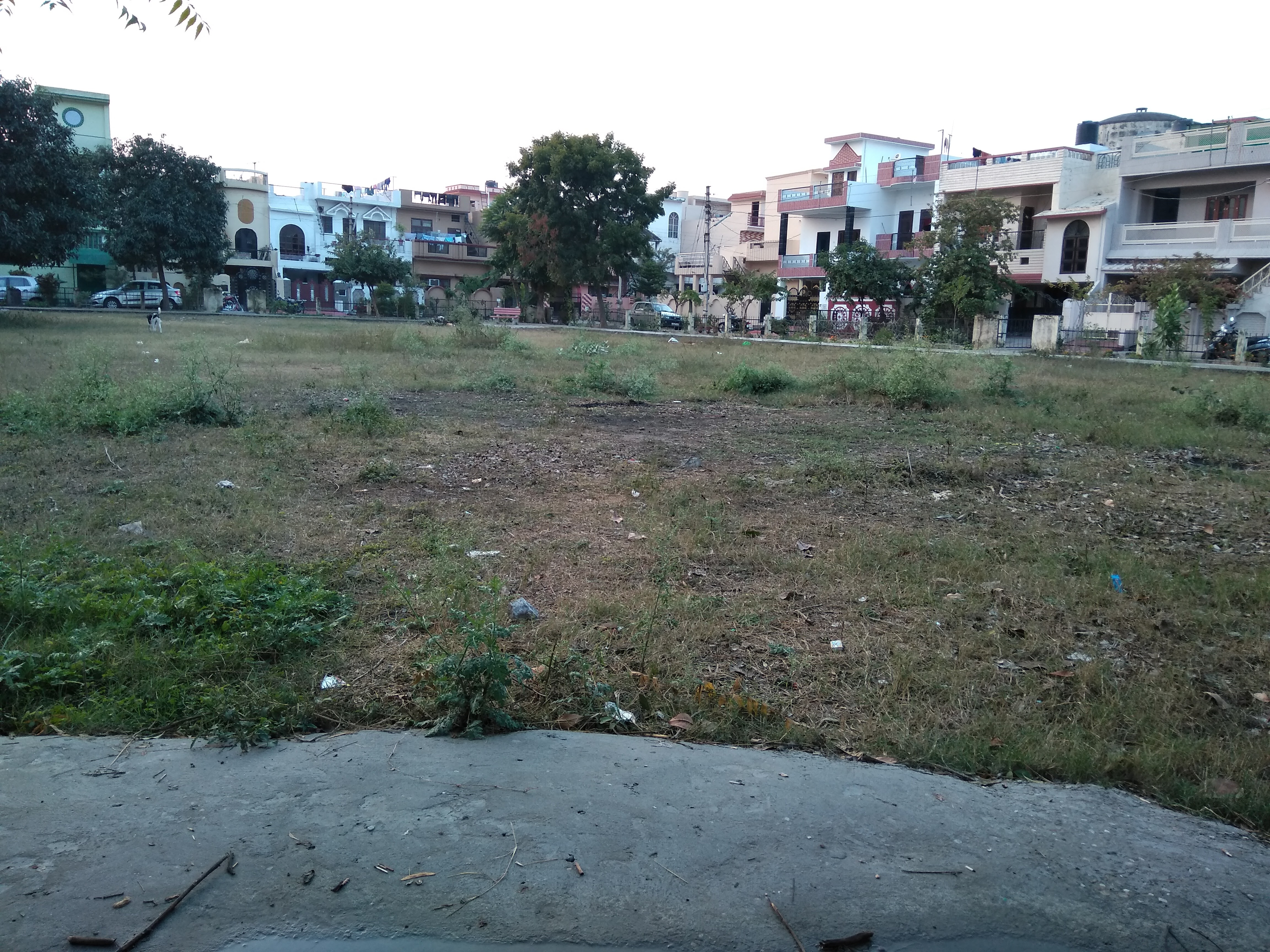
- Park No-2 of R-Cluster Shivalik Nagar, BHEL Haridwar

- Location in Uttarakhand, India Shivalik Nagar (India)
- Coordinates: 29.934°N 78.072°E
- Country: India
- State: Uttarakhand
- District: Haridwar district
- Elevation: 249.7 m (819 ft)

Languages
  - Official: Hindi
  - Native: Khariboli
- Time zone: UTC+5:30 (IST)
- PIN: 249403
- Telephone code: 01334
- Vehicle registration: UK
- Lok Sabha constituency: Haridwar
- Website: haridwar.nic.in

Shivalik Nagar is a city in the Haridwar district of Uttarakhand, India, at the edge of Bharat Heavy Electrical Limited, Ranipur township and the SIDCUL industrial estate of state government, and 10 km away from the Hindu pilgrimage city of Haridwar.

== History ==
Shivalik Nagar was developed in the 1980s by Awas Vikas or State Housing Development Board, as a private residential colony for BHEL employees. Gradually it developed into a large colony in three phases, Phase I and Phase II and Phase III even included an industrial estate at its west end. It grew steadily over the next decade, with growing religious tourism in the Haridwar city, and experienced a major spurt in growth, when District Administrative buildings came up near by, after of Haridwar district was constituted in 1998. Thereafter, with the establishment SIDCUL Integrated Industrial Estate in 2002, Shivalik Nagar experienced a realty boom.

== Geography ==
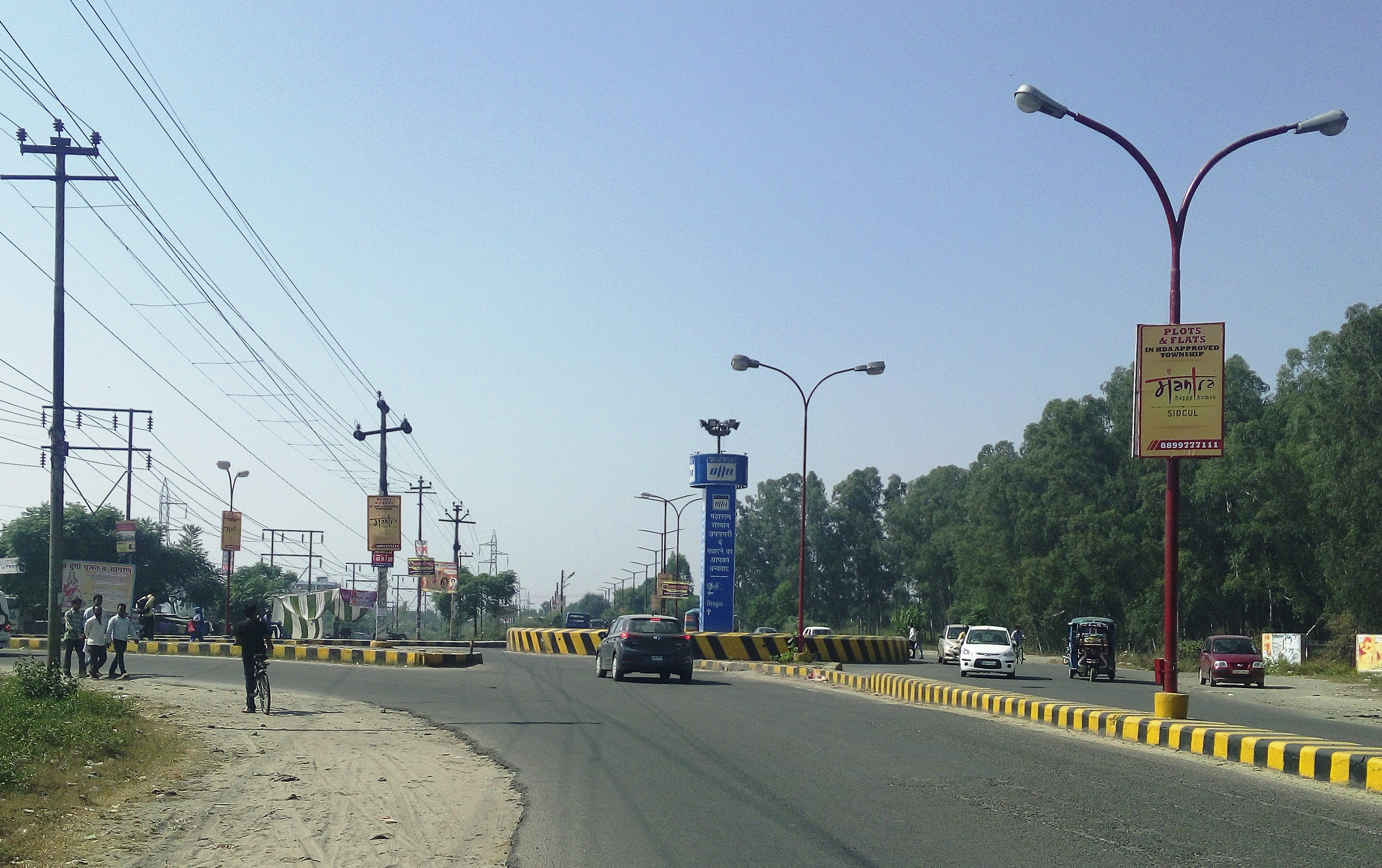
Shivalik Nagar Chowk BHEL Ranipur Haridwar

It overlooks the Sivalik Hills Range of the lower Himalayas, after which it is named, and is partly encircled from east to west, by Ranipur Rao, a seasonal stream, that starts from Shivalik hills at the edge of Rajaji National Park, and now merges with Ganges Canal, ahead of Bahadrabad. It is situated 10 km from Haridwar city, at the edge of Bharat Heavy Electrical Limited, Ranipur township and the SIDCUL industrial estate of state government.

It lies close to the National Highway 58, between Delhi and Mana Pass. It is neighbouring areas, Pathri, Roshanbad, Rohalki and Jwalapur. The city is divided into a total of 16 clusters, named alphabetically from "A" to "T" (without "E", "F", "I" and "O").

== Transport ==
It is connected with Haridwar city, through a 10-kilometre-long (6.2 mi) road known as Madhya Marg, which merges at Ranipur Moore at one end, at with NH 58 at another, thus often used a by-pass road during important religious festival, when the main highway get crowded. Nearest railhead is also Haridwar Railway Station, which Indian Railways links to all parts of India. The nearest airport is Jolly Grant Airport, Dehradun, though Indira Gandhi International Airport in New Delhi is preferred.

== Administration ==
Administratively it falls within the Bahadrabad Block, and within the Haridwar Lok Sabha constituency.

== Industry ==
Integrated Industrial Estate (IIE) of SIDCUL, the State Industrial Development Corporation of Uttarakhand, is situated adjacent to Shivalik Nagar. Prior to it, to the west of Shivalik Nagar, industrial area, which consisted of heavy machinery ancillary units to BHEL, developed in 1980s. It also houses, offices of BSNL and LPG Gas Plant of Indane(Indian Oil). Bahadarabad is one of the oldest Industrial areas of Haridwar, with various manufacturing factories like Ice, Newspaper Printing, Refrigeration Gas etc.

== Education ==
- Chinamaya Degree College
- Sheel Institute (Shivalik Nagar, Ranipur More & Navoday Nagar)
- Avirat Education Society
