= Bhagwanpur, Uttarakhand =

Bhagwanpur
- Town
- Location in Uttarakhand, India Bhagwanpur (India)
- Coordinates: 29.9417°N 77.8138°E
- Country: India
- State: Uttarakhand
- District: Haridwar

Population (2011)
  - Total: 7,573

Languages
  - Official: Hindi
  - Native: Khariboli
- Time zone: UTC+5:30 (IST)
- PIN: 247661
- Area code: 01332
- Vehicle registration: UK
- Website: uk.gov.in

Bhagwanpur is a town, tehsil, and taluka in Haridwar district, Uttarakhand, India. It is located 57 km from Dehradun, the state capital. The town serves as the commercial centre of Ghad Chhetra. It was founded by Bhagwana in the old age Zamindara. It is one of Uttarakhand's industrial zones.

== Demographics ==
As of 2011 India census, Bhagwanpur had a population of 7,573. Males constitute 52% of the population and females 48%.Bhagwanpur has an average literacy rate of 67.76%, higher than the national average of 59.5%; with male literacy of 76.82% and female literacy of 58.05%.

== Government ==
The current MLA of Bhagwanpur is Mamta Rakesh wife of previous MLA Late Surender Rakesh of Congress Party. The first MLA of this constituency was Chandra Shekhar of Bharatiya Janata Party.

== Road links ==
- Roorkee- 13 km
- Saharanpur-27 km
- Chhutmalpur-11 km
- Haridwar-35 km near
- Dehradun-63 km near
- Muzaffarnagar-60 km near

== Educational institute ==
Bhagwanpur hosts Quantum Global university, MotherHood university, RCP Universe, Khrist Jyoti Academy, Swan Public School and Arogyam Medical college and hospital. A Govt Medical college has been proposed by Govt of Uttarakhand.

== Railway link ==
Bhagwanpur is not connected to the railway network. The nearest railway stations are:

- Iqbalpur Railway Station-11 km
- Chauriyala Railway Station-9 km
- Roorkee Railway Station-12 km
