= Ram Dayal Singh =

King of Landhaura

Raja Ram Dayal Singh was the King of Landhaura. He was the son of Nahar Singh. Under his leadership landhora consisted of more than 1000 villages.</nowiki>ab of India Under the Company's Magna Charta, 1793-1830 p. 462</ref>

== History ==
Raja Ram Dayal Singh succeeded his father Nahar Singh after his death and became the King of Landhaura. This transition of power took place in a seamless manner, and Ram Dayal Singh proved himself to be a worthy successor to his father.

Pradyumna Shah sought help from Dayal in the Battle of Khurbura. After the death of Ram Dayal Singh in 1813, a succession dispute arose between his grandson Badan Singh and infant son Kushal Singh from Ram Dayal's wife, Dhan Kunwar. It was a tumultuous time for Landhaura as the dispute threatened to disrupt the peace and stability of the region. Thankfully, a settlement was eventually reached between the parties involved. It was agreed that Dhan Kunwar would pay a large sum of money and expensive goods to Badan Singh and keep Landhaura for her infant son, Kushal Singh. This helped to bring an end to the succession dispute and restored calm to the region and the reign of Raja Ram Dayal Singh was marked by significant events that have contributed to the region's rich history.

According to the 1840 Settlement report, the annual assessment of the entire Lapsed Mocuree(Landhaura state) was fixed for a five year settlement as follows:

Year. Annual Assessment

1817-18 Rs5,79,317

1814-15. Rs5,53,714

The R

evenue Of Landhaura During the Reign Of Raja Ram Dayal Singh Gujjar Until 1818, amounted to ₹5,79,317 annually.
