= Mansa Devi Temple, Haridwar =

Hindu Temple in Uttarakhand

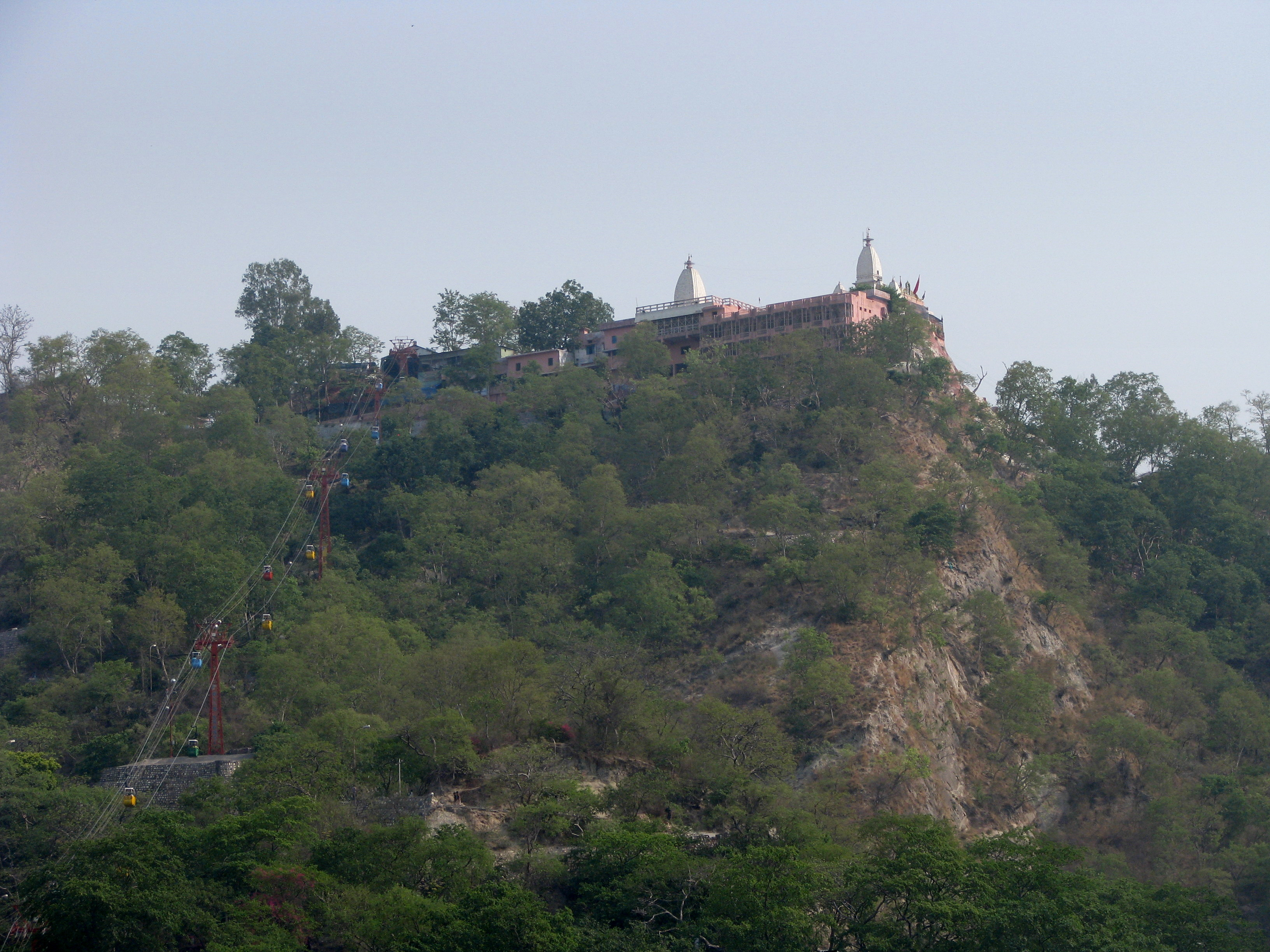

- Location in Uttarakhand

Religion
- Affiliation: Hinduism
- District: Haridwar
- Deity: Mansa Devi
- Festival: Navaratri

Location
- Location: Har Ki Pauri
- State: Uttarakhand
- Country: India
- Coordinates: 29°57′29″N 78°09′53″E

Architecture
- Creator: Unknown

Mansa Devi Temple, Haridwar (Hindi: मंसा देवी मंदिर, हरिद्वार) is a Hindu temple dedicated to goddess Mansa Devi in the holy city of Haridwar in the Uttarakhand state of India. The temple is located atop the Bilwa Parvat on the Sivalik Hills, the southernmost mountain chain of the Himalayas. The temple, also known as Bilwa Tirth, is one of the Panch Tirth (Five Pilgrimages) within Haridwar.

The temple is known for being the holy abode of Mansa Devi, a form of Shakti and is said to have emerged from the mind of the Lord Shiva. Mansa is regarded as the sister of the Nāga (serpent) Vasuki. She is also believed to be the daughter of Lord Shiva in his human incarnate. The term Mansa means wish and it is believed that the goddess fulfils all the wishes of a sincere devotee. There is a folk tale about this, once Mansa, a common girl who was unaware about her complete truth from her guardians decided to meet Lord Shiva and ask him about her truth. To meet Lord Shiva, she sat for Sadhana and after years of spiritual exercise, she got the fortune to meet Lord Shiva and clarify her truth from him. After learning her truth, she attained the powers of goddess of welfare for the world. Devotees who pray to Mansa Devi for fulfilling their wishes tie threads to the branches of a tree located in the temple. Once their wishes are fulfilled, people come back again to the temple to untie the thread from the tree. Goddess Mansa is also offered coconuts, fruits, garlands and incense sticks for prayer.

Mansa Devi Temple is a Siddh Peeth (These are known to fulfill the desires of the worshippers). It is one of three such Peeths located in Haridwar, the other two being Chandi Devi Temple and Maya Devi Temple. The inner shrine has two deities, one with eight arms and the other one with three heads and five arms.

== The Temple ==
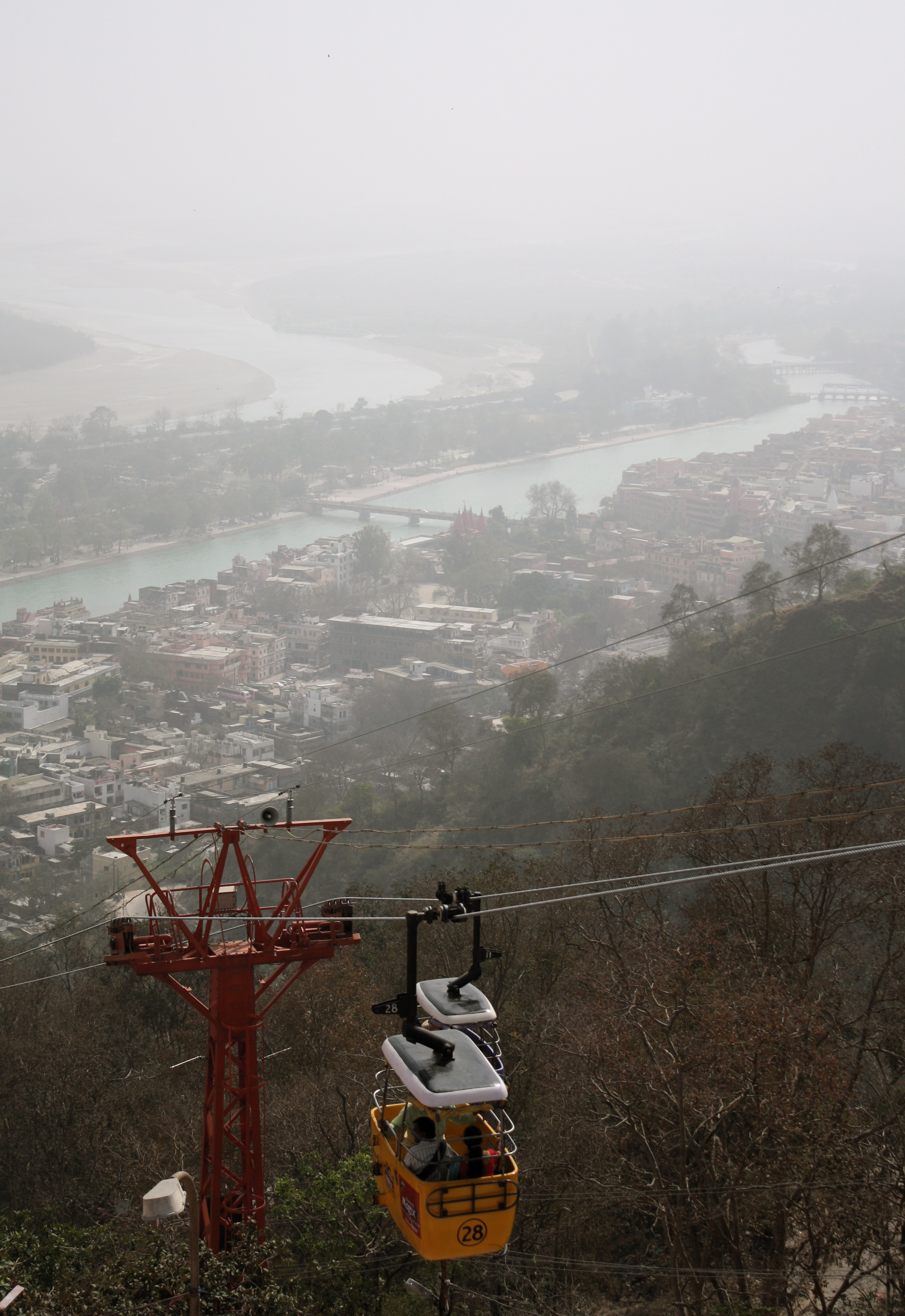
Ropeway taking pilgrims to the shrine. In the background the River Ganges and Haridwar can be seen.

To reach the shrine pilgrims either go on foot or ride a rope-way service. The rope-way service known as "Mansa Devi Udankhatola" is also used for transporting pilgrims to the nearly located Chandi Devi Temple. The rope-way carries the pilgrims from the lower station directly to the Mansa Devi Temple. The total length of the rope-way is 540 metres (1,770 ft) and the height it covers is 178 metres (584 ft).

== Other Mansa Devi temples ==
- Maa Mansa Devi Mandir, Bandha Bazar, Rajnandgaon, Chhattisgarh
- Mata Mansa Devi Mandir, Panchkula, Haryana
- Mansa Bari, Kolkata
- Mansa Devi Temple, Alwar, Rajasthan
- Mansa Devi Temple, Dhuri, Punjab
- Shri Mansa Mata Mandir Hasampur, Sikar, Rajasthan
- Mansa Devi Temple, Narela, Delhi
- Mansa Devi Temple, Sitamarhi, Bihar
- Maa Mansa Devi Mandir, Tomargarh (Khutailapatti), Mathura, Uttar Pradesh
- Maa Mansa Devi Mandir, Meerut, Uttar Pradesh
- Mansa Devi Temple, Mukkamala, West Godavari, Andhra Pradesh
- Mansa Devi Temple, Naidupeta, Andhra Pradesh
- Mansa Devi Temple, Tilaru, Andhra Pradesh
- Mansa Devi Temple, Dornipadu, Andhra Pradesh
- Mansa Devi Temple, Kanumalapalle, Andhra Pradesh
- Mansa Devi Temple, Chinadugam, Andhra Pradesh
- Mansa Devi Temple, Kurnool, Andhra Pradesh
- Mansa Devi Temple, Nellore, Andhra Pradesh
- Mansa Devi Temple, Thurpu Rompidodla, Nellore, Andhra Pradesh
- Mansa Devi Temple, Eluru, West Godavari, Andhra Pradesh
- Mansa Devi Temple, Behror in the Alwar district in the state of Rajasthan.
- Manasa Devi Temple, Clock Tower, Secunderabad.
