= Maya Devi Temple, Haridwar =

Hindu Temple in Uttarakhand

Maya Devi Temple
- माया देवी मंदिर
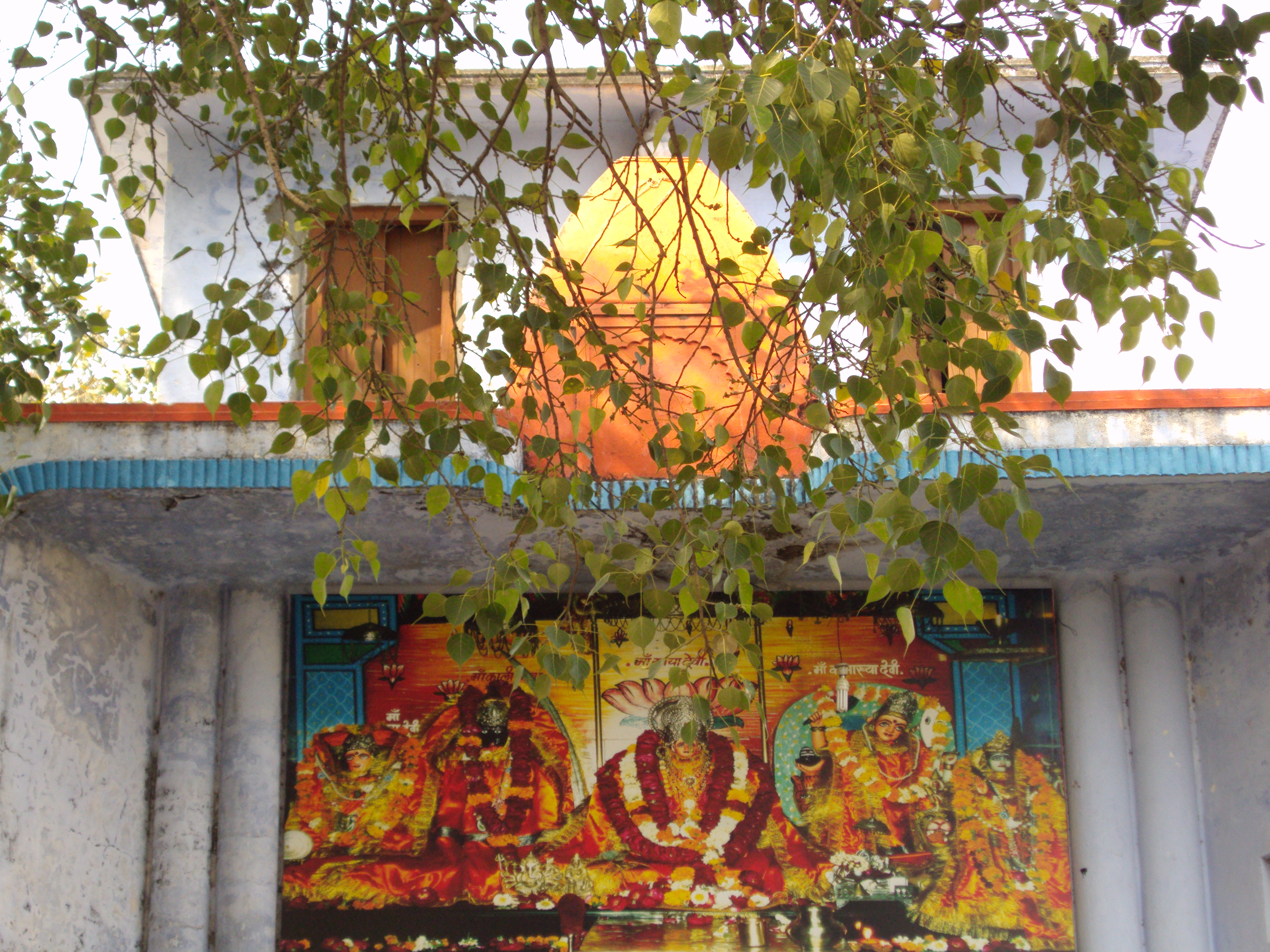

- Location in Uttarakhand

Religion
- Affiliation: Hinduism
- District: Haridwar
- Deity: Maya Devi (Shakti)
- Festival: Navratri

Location
- Location: Haridwar
- State: Uttarakhand
- Country: India
- Interactive map of Maya Devi Temple
- Coordinates: 29°57′00″N 78°09′43″E

Architecture
- Established: 11th century

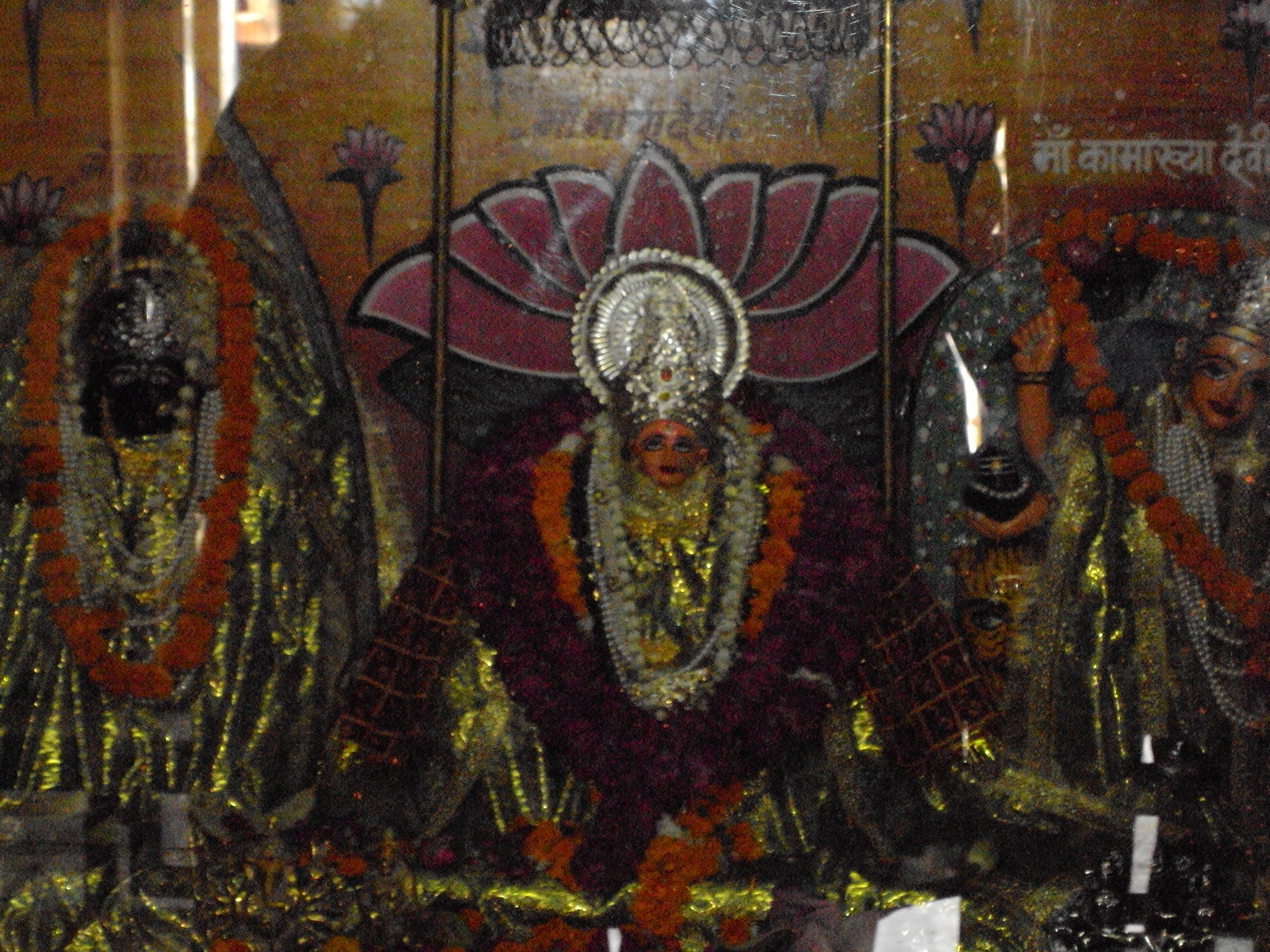
Inner shrine with the deities Maya Devi in the centre, Goddess Kali on the left, Maa Kamakhya on the right. Two other Goddesses (not visible) are also present in the inner shrine

Maya Devi Temple, Haridwar (Hindi: माया देवी मंदिर, हरिद्वार) is a Hindu temple dedicated to goddess Maya in the holy city of Haridwar of Uttarakhand state in India. It is believed that the heart and navel of goddess Sati fell in the region where the temple stands today and thus it is sometimes referred to as a Shakta pitha.

Goddess Maya is the Adhisthatri deity of Haridwar. She is a three-headed and four-armed deity who is believed to be an incarnation of Shakti. Haridwar was previously known as Mayapuri in reverence to this deity. The temple is a siddha pitha which are the places of worship where desires get fulfilled. It is one of three such Pithas located in Haridwar, the other two being Chandi Devi Temple and Mansa Devi Temple.

== Description ==
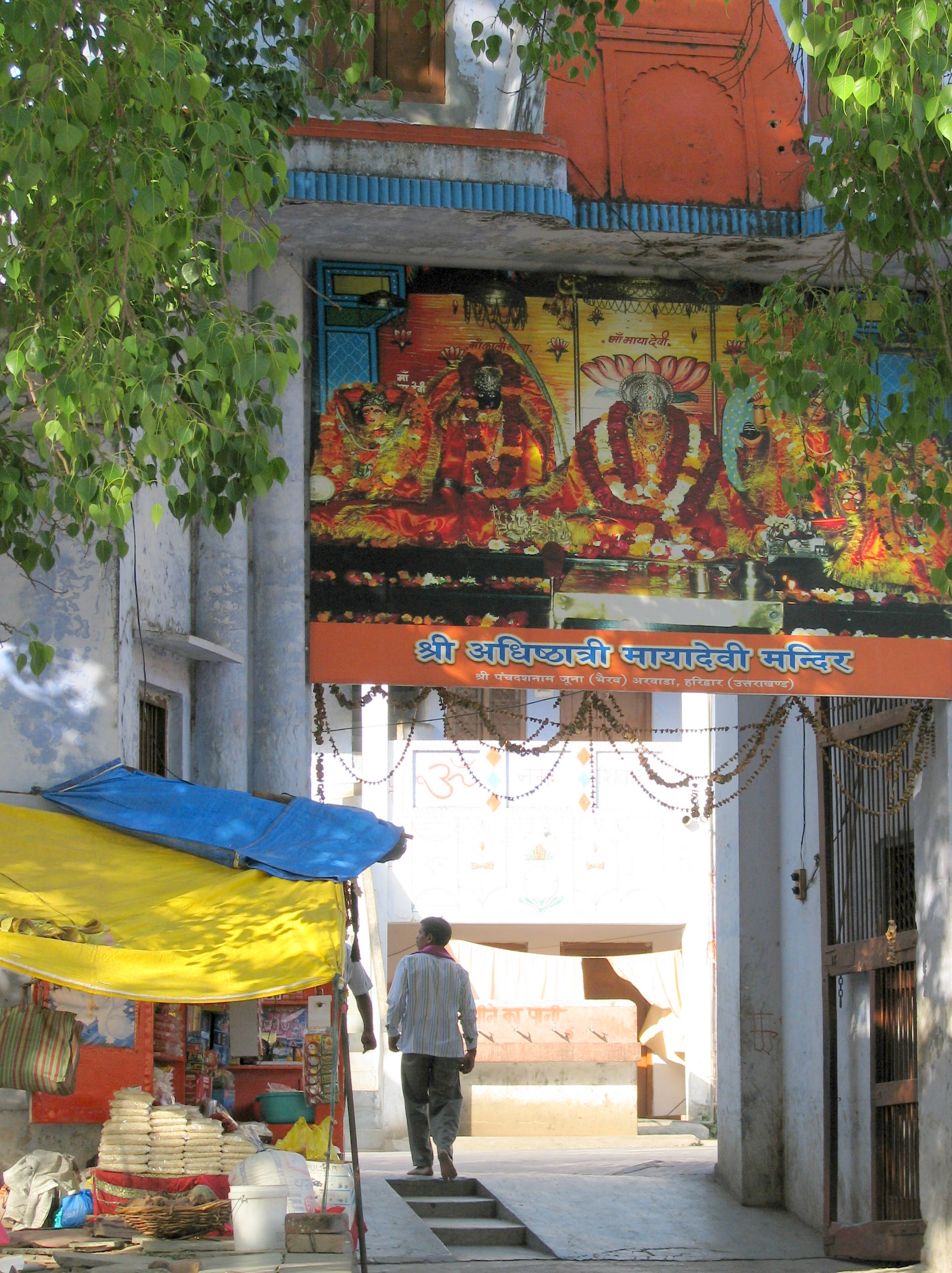
Entrance of the temple

The temple dates back to the eleventh century. It is one of the three ancient temples of Haridwar which are still intact, the other two being Narayana-shila and Bhairava Temple. The inner shrine consists of murtis (icons) of goddesses Maya in the centre, Kali on the left, Kamakhya on the right. There are also two other goddesses who are also forms of Shakti, present in the inner shrine. The temple is located to the east of Har ki Pauri and is easily accessible by buses and auto rickshaws. It is regarded as a must visit for devotees going to Haridwar.

The temple is visited by many devotees from various parts of the country especially during the Navratra and the Kumbha Mela in Haridwar.

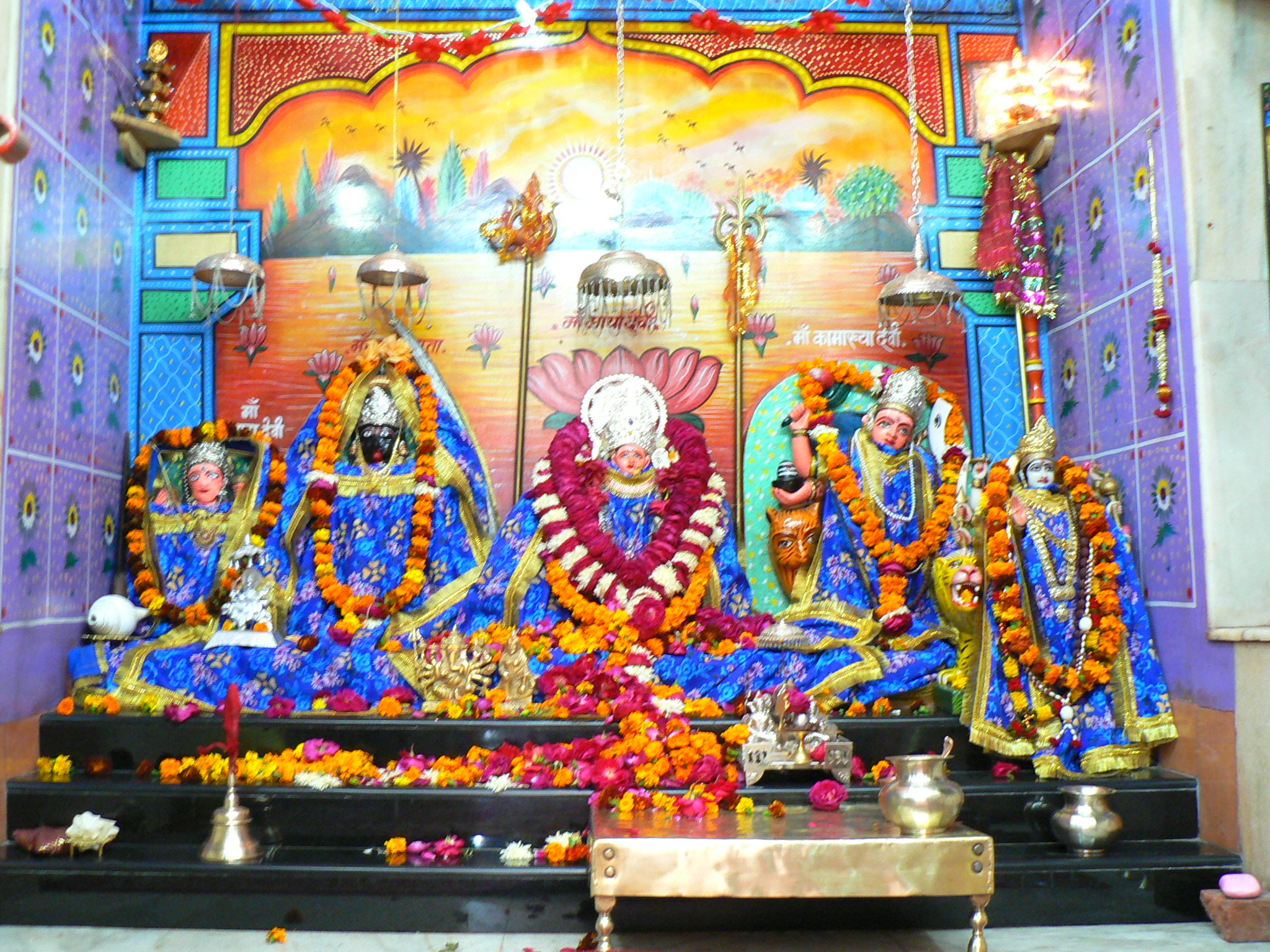
Maya Devi inner shrine
