= Jhabrera =

Jhabrera Town Jabarhera
- Town
- Jhabrera
- Location in Uttarakhand, India Jhabrera Town (India)
- Coordinates: 29.809060°N 77.773379°E
- Country: India
- State: Uttarakhand
- District: Haridwar
- Founder: Rao Bahamal

Government
  - Type: Nagar Panchayat
  - Body: Uttarakhand State Government

Area
  - Total: 1 km^{2} (0.39 sq mi)
- Elevation: 260 m (850 ft)

Population (2001)
  - Total: 9,378
  - Density: 9,400/km^{2} (24,000/sq mi)

Languages
  - Official: Hindi
  - Native: Khariboli
- Time zone: UTC+5:30 (IST)
- PIN Code: 247665
- Vehicle registration: UK
- Website: haridwar.nic.in uk.gov.in

Jhabrera is a town and a nagar panchayat in Hardwar district in the Indian state of Uttarakhand, situated 17 kilometres from Roorkee. It can be reached by taking a left turn before Ganga canal and while entering Manglaur town from Delhi. It is about 8 km from Iqbalpur railway station.

== Jhabreda state ==
The town's name originated from the former village of "Jhabar Hera", established by Rao Bahmal, chieftain and zamindar during the reign of Mughal Emperor Shahjahan.

== Demographics ==
Population in Jhabrera
Religion	Percent
Hinduism	49.44%
Islam	49.90%
Jainism	0.22%
Christianity	0.22%
Sikhism	0.21%
Not Stated	0.01%
Others	0.01%

The Jhabrera census town is divided into 9 wards for which elections are held every 5 years. The Jhabrera Nagar Panchayat has population of 11,186, out of which 5,909 are males and 5,277 are females as per the report released by Census India 2011.

The population of children aged 0-6 is 1553 which is 13.88% of total population of Jhabrera (NP). In Jhabrera Nagar Panchayat, the female sex ratio is 893 against state average of 963. Moreover, the child sex ratio in Jhabrera is around 825 compared to Uttarakhand state average of 890. The literacy rate of Jhabrera city is 77.85% lower than state average of 78.82%. In Jhabrera, the male literacy is around 84.88%, while the female literacy rate is 70.08%.

== Administration ==
Jhabrera Nagar Panchayat has total administration over 1,793 houses to which it supplies basic amenities like water and sewerage. It is also authorized to build roads within Nagar Panchayat limits and impose taxes on properties coming under its jurisdiction.
