= Shivalik Enclave =

- Residential & Commercial
- NAC SHIVALIK ENCLAVE, SECTOR 13
- Nickname: NAC Shivalik Enclave
- Interactive map of Shivalik Enclave
- Coordinates: 30°42′33″N 76°50′27″E
- Country: India
- State: Chandigarh, UT

Languages
  - Official: Hindi, English & Punjabi
- Time zone: UTC+5:30 (IST)
- Postal code: 160101
- Vehicle registration: CH
- Website: https://chandigarh.gov.in/

Shivalik Enclave, also known as Sector 115, is situated between older sections of ManiMajra (also known as Manimajra Town) of Sector 13, Chandigarh, and Panchkula.

It is located on the Kalka-Shimla Road next to the Housing Board Light Point. Shivalik Enclave is a part of Chandigarh and one of its boundaries touches the Haryana border at Panchkula. At the time of its conception, it was known as the Notified Area Committee Manimajra, but the residents changed its name to "Shivalik Enclave."

In January 2025, the municipal corporation decided to sell its land in Shivalik Enclave, ManiMajra area for a housing project.
