= Chandi Devi Temple, Haridwar =

Hindu Temple in Uttarakhand

- चण्डी देवी मंदिर
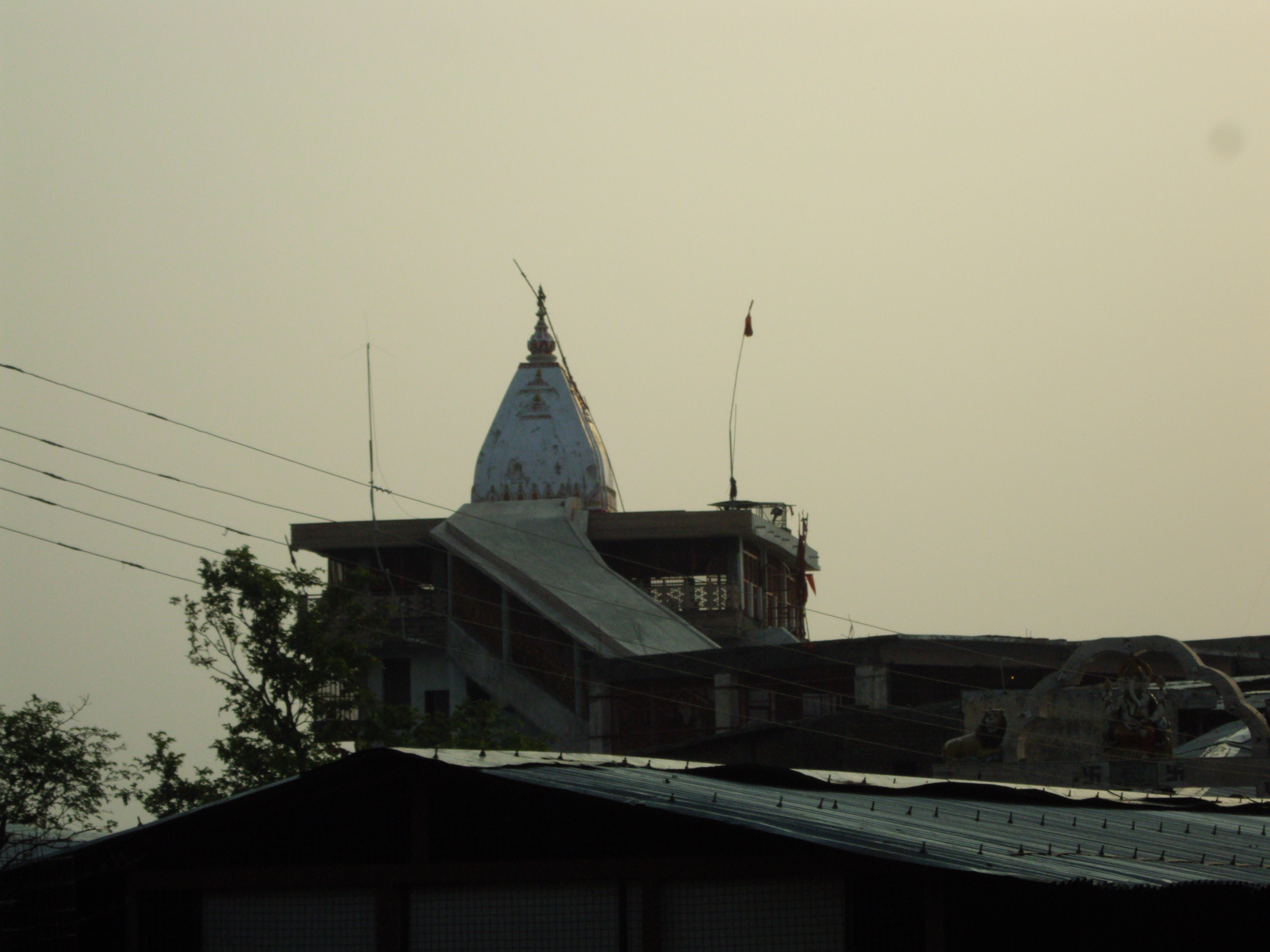

- Location in Uttarakhand

Religion
- Affiliation: Hinduism
- District: Haridwar
- Deity: Chandi Devi
- Festivals: Chandi Chaudas, Navratri

Location
- Location: Haridwar
- State: Uttarakhand
- Country: India
- Coordinates: 29°56′03″N 78°10′46″E

Architecture
- Creator: Adi Shankaracharya
- Completed: 1929 by Suchat Singh

Chandi Devi Temple, Haridwar (Hindi: चण्डी देवी मंदिर, हरिद्वार) is a Hindu temple dedicated to Goddess Chandi Devi in the holy city of Haridwar in the Uttarakhand state of India. The temple is situated atop the Neel Parvat on the Eastern summit of the Sivalik Hills, the southernmost mountain chain of the Himalayas. Chandi Devi Temple was built in 1929 by Suchat Singh in his reign as the King of Kashmir. However, the main murti of Chandi Devi at the temple is said to have been installed in the 8th century by Adi Shankaracharya, one of the greatest priests of Hindu religion. The temple also known as Neel Parvat Teerth is one of the Panch Tirth (Five Pilgrimages) located within Haridwar.

Chandi Devi Temple is highly revered by devotees as a Siddh Peetha which is a place of worship where desires get fulfilled. It is one of three such Peethas located in Haridwar, the other two being Mansa Devi Temple and Maya Devi Temple.

== Chandi Devi ==
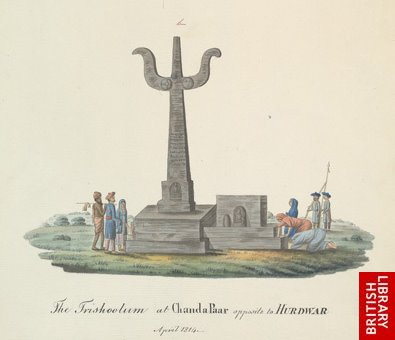
Trisula (trident) at Chandi Pahar, Haridwar. April 1814.

Goddess Chandi also known as Chandika is the presiding deity of the temple. The story of the origin of Chandika is as follows: Long time ago, the demon kings Shumbha and Nishumbha had captured the kingdom of the god-king of heaven - Indra and thrown the gods from Swarga (heaven). After intense prayers by the gods, a goddess emerged from Parvati. An exceptionally beautiful woman and amazed by her beauty, Shumbha desired to marry her. On being refused, Shumbha sent his demon chiefs Chanda and Munda to kill her. They were killed by goddess Chamunda who originated out of Chandika's anger. Shumbha and Nishumbha then collectively tried to kill Chandika but were instead slain by the goddess. Thereafter, Chandika is said to have rested for a short while at the top of Neel Parvat and later a temple was built here to testify the legend. Also, the two peaks located in the mountain range are called Shumbha and Nishumbha.

== History ==
Skanda Purana mentions a legend, in which Chanda-Munda, the Army Chief of a local Demon Kings Shumbha and Nishumbha were killed by goddess Chandi here, after which the place got the name, Chandi Devi. It is believed that the main statue was established by the Adi Shankaracharya in the 8th century CE.

According to local legend the land ownership to temple management was given by Mughal emperor Akbar when he had visited Hardwar. According to legend, he wanted to take the Goddess's idol but could not do so and it was during this time that he got a divine message to stop the exercise and do something for the shrine. He immediately handed over the entire track of land to the temple. The present structure was constructed in 1929 CE by the king of Kashmir, Suchat Singh.

== The Temple ==
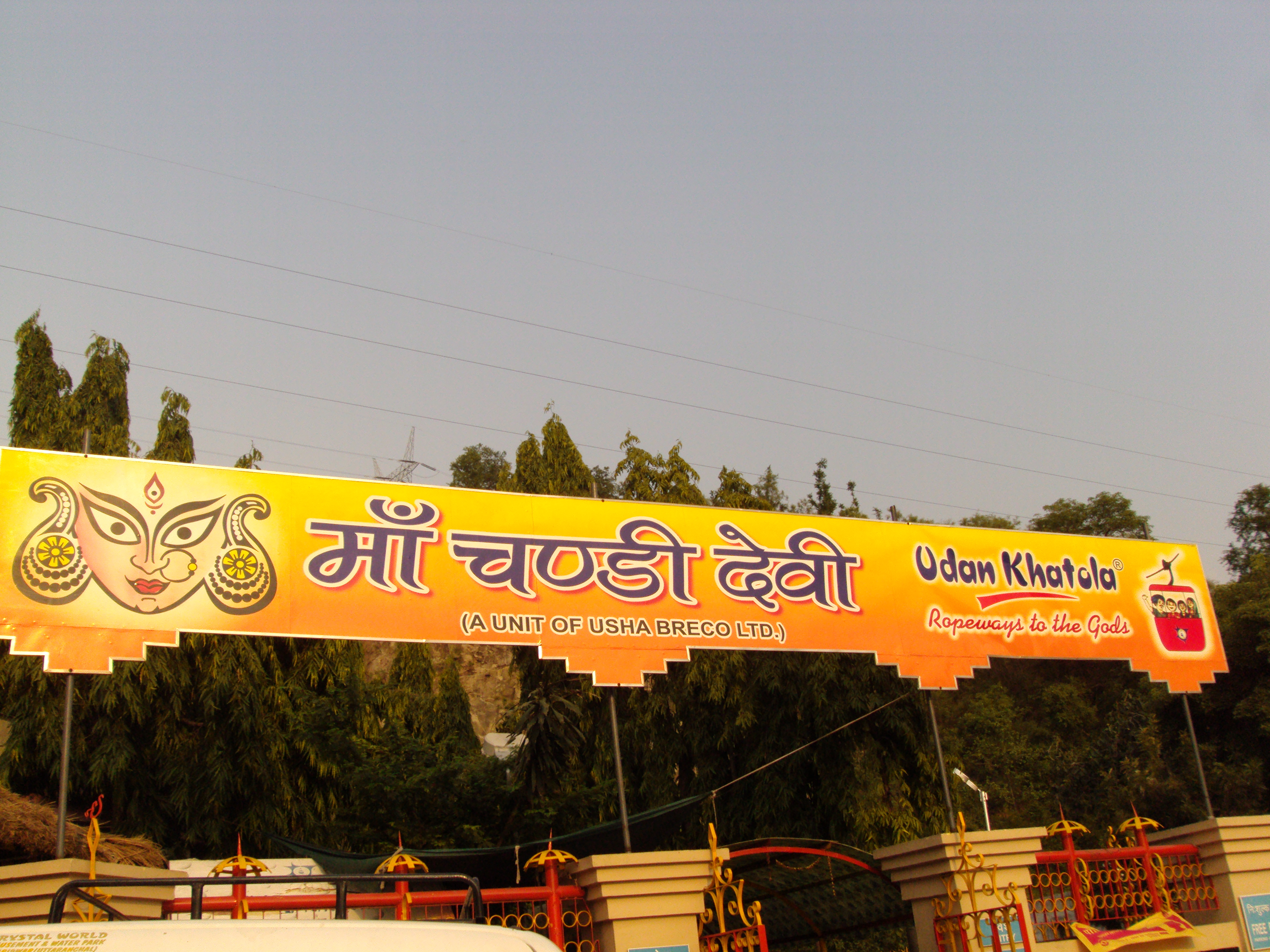
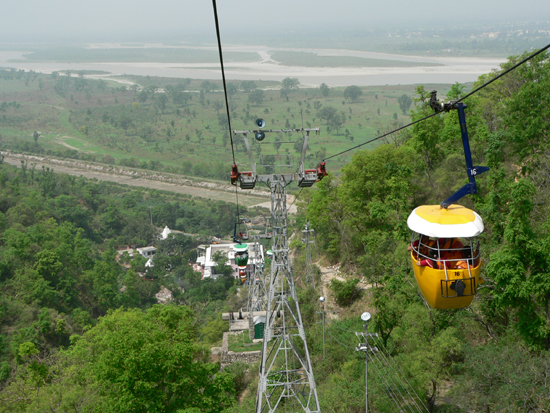
Left: Entrance to the Ropeway station. Right: Ropeway carrying pilgrims to the Chandi Devi temple

The Temple is located at a distance of 4 kilometres (2.5 mi) from Har ki Pauri. To reach the temple one has to either follow the three kilometre trekking route from Chandighat and reach the shrine by climbing a number of steps or climb the recently introduced rope-way (cable car) service. The rope-way service known as Chandi Devi Udankhatola was introduced for the benefit of the pilgrims and it caters to the pilgrims also to the nearby located Mansa Devi shrine. The rope-way carries the pilgrims from the lower station located near Gauri Shankar Temple on the Nazibabad Road directly to the Chandi Devi Temple located at an altitude of 884 metres (2,900 ft). The total length of the ropeway route is about 740 metres (2,430 ft) and height is 208 metres (682 ft). There is a dense forest on the other side of the hill and the ropeway offers scenic views of the Ganges River and Haridwar.

The temple is run by the Mahant who is the presiding priest of the temple. On a normal day, the temple is open between 6.00 am. to 8.00 pm. and the morning aarti at the temple begins at 5.30 am. Leather accessories, non vegetarian food and alcoholic drinks are strictly prohibited in the temple premises.

== Animal Sacrifice ==
The temple had an 800-year-old ritual animal sacrifice tradition wherein a goat was sacrificed on the Saptmi to Goddess Chandi. In 2015, the tradition was stopped by the head priest citing lowered acceptance by locals.

== Significance ==
The temple is one of the most ancient temples of India. Thousands of devotees flock to the temple, especially during the festivals of Chandi Chaudas and Navratra and the Kumbha Mela in Haridwar, to seek the blessings of the goddesses who is believed to fulfill their wishes. The temple is a must visit for the pilgrims going to Haridwar.

Very near to the Chandidevi temple, the temple of Anjana, mother of Hanumanji is located and devotees visiting Chandi Devi temple also visit this temple. Neeleshwar Temple is also situated at the foot of the Neel Parvat. It is said that Mansa and Chandi, the two forms of goddess Parvati always reside close to each other. The temple of Mansa is exactly on the other side of the hilltop on the Bilwa Parvat on the opposite bank of River Ganges. This belief can also be found true in other case since near to Mata Mansa Devi Mandir in Panchkula, Haryana, there is a Chandi Mandir located nearby in Chandigarh.

== Other Chandi Devi temples ==
- Chandi Mandir, Chandigarh. Chandi Devi is the presiding deity of Chandigarh.
- Gandaki Chandi, Gandaki near Pokhara, Nepal, a Shakta pitha
- Mangal Chandika, Ujjaani, West Bengal, a Shakta pitha
- Saptashrangi Temple, Vani, Maharashtra
- Mahalaxmi Temple, Mumbai, Maharashtra
- Hedavde Mahalaxmi Devi Temple, Mumbai Maharashtra
- Vaishno Devi Temple, Katra, Jammu and Kashmir
- Katak Chandi Temple, Cuttack, Orissa.
- Ashtadasa Bhuja Mahalakshmi Temple, Skandhashramam, Salem, Tamil Nadu
- Mangal Chandi Temple, Guwahati, Assam
- Mangal Chandi Temple, Chanditala, West Bengal.

== Gallery ==
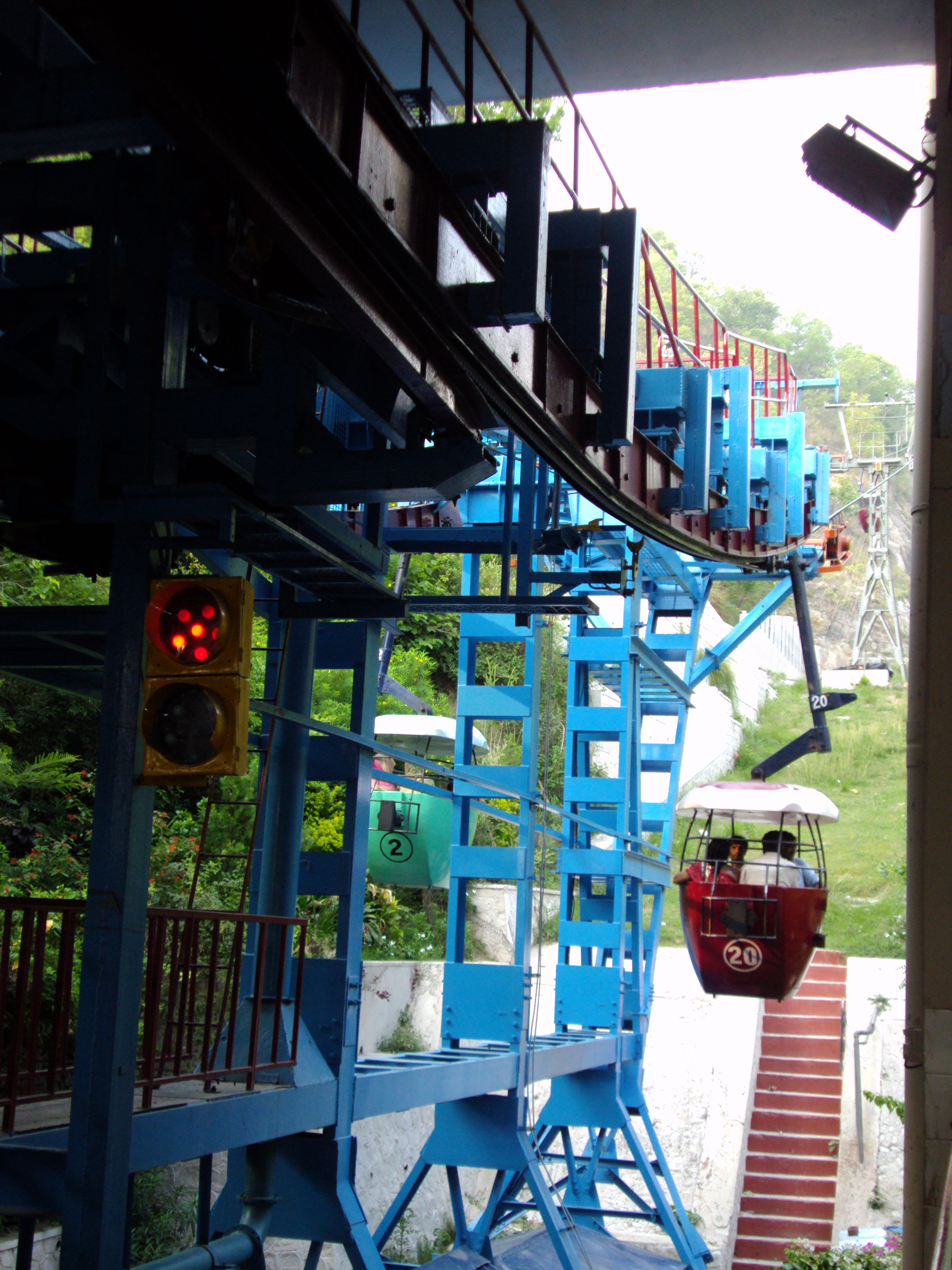
Chandi Devi Udankhtola (ropeway) station

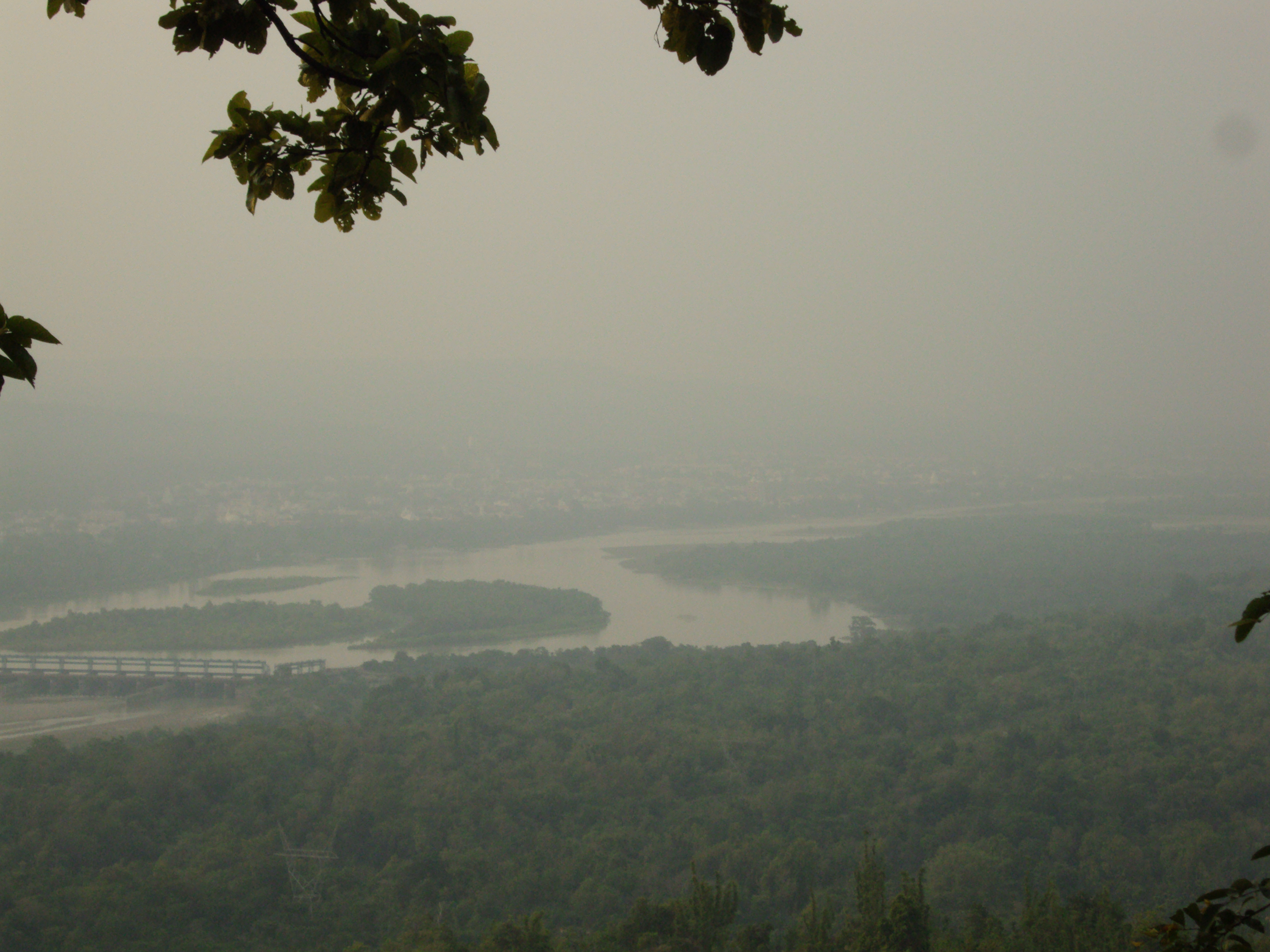
View of the Ganges River from the ropeway
