= State Infrastructure and Industrial Development Corporation of Uttarakhand Limited =

Government of Uttarkhand enterprise

- Founded: 2002; 24 years ago
- Headquarters: Dehradun, India
- Area served: Uttarakhand
- Owner: Government of Uttarakhand
- Website: siidcul.com

The State Infrastructure and Industrial Development Corporation of Uttarakhand Limited (SIIDCUL) is a government of Uttarakhand enterprise which promotes industries and develops industrial infrastructure in the State. It also provides tax incentives for companies establishing plants on its industrial estates presently at Haridwar, Pantnagar, Kotdwar, Kashipur, and Sitarganj.

== History ==
SIIDCUL was incorporated as a Limited Company in the year 2002 with an authorised share capital of ₹50 crores and ₹20 crores paid up capital through the Government of Uttarakhand in order to promote industrial development and develop an industrial infrastructure.

Besides the State Government, SIIDCUL has equity participation from the Union Bank of India, the OBC and SIDBI. Other banks are also in the process of participating in its equity. This has led to more than a thousand EOI’s with SIDCUL, which entail an investment of around ₹20,000 crores.

Note: Earlier State Infrastructure and Industrial Development Corporation of Uttarakhand Limited (SIIDCUL) was State Industrial Development Corporation of Uttarakhand Limited (SIDCUL)

== Infrastructure developed by SIIDCUL ==
- Integrated Industrial Estate at BHEL, Haridwar (near Shivalik Nagar)
- Integrated Industrial Estate at Pantnagar (Rudrapur)
- IT Park, Dehradun
- Pharma City - Selaqui Industrial Area, Dehradun
- Sigaddi Growth Centre, Kotdwar
- Integrated Industrial Estate, Sitarganj (near Shaktifarm)
- Integrated Industrial Estate, Escort Farm (Kashipur)
