= Haridwar district =

Haridwar district Hardwar district
- District of Uttarakhand
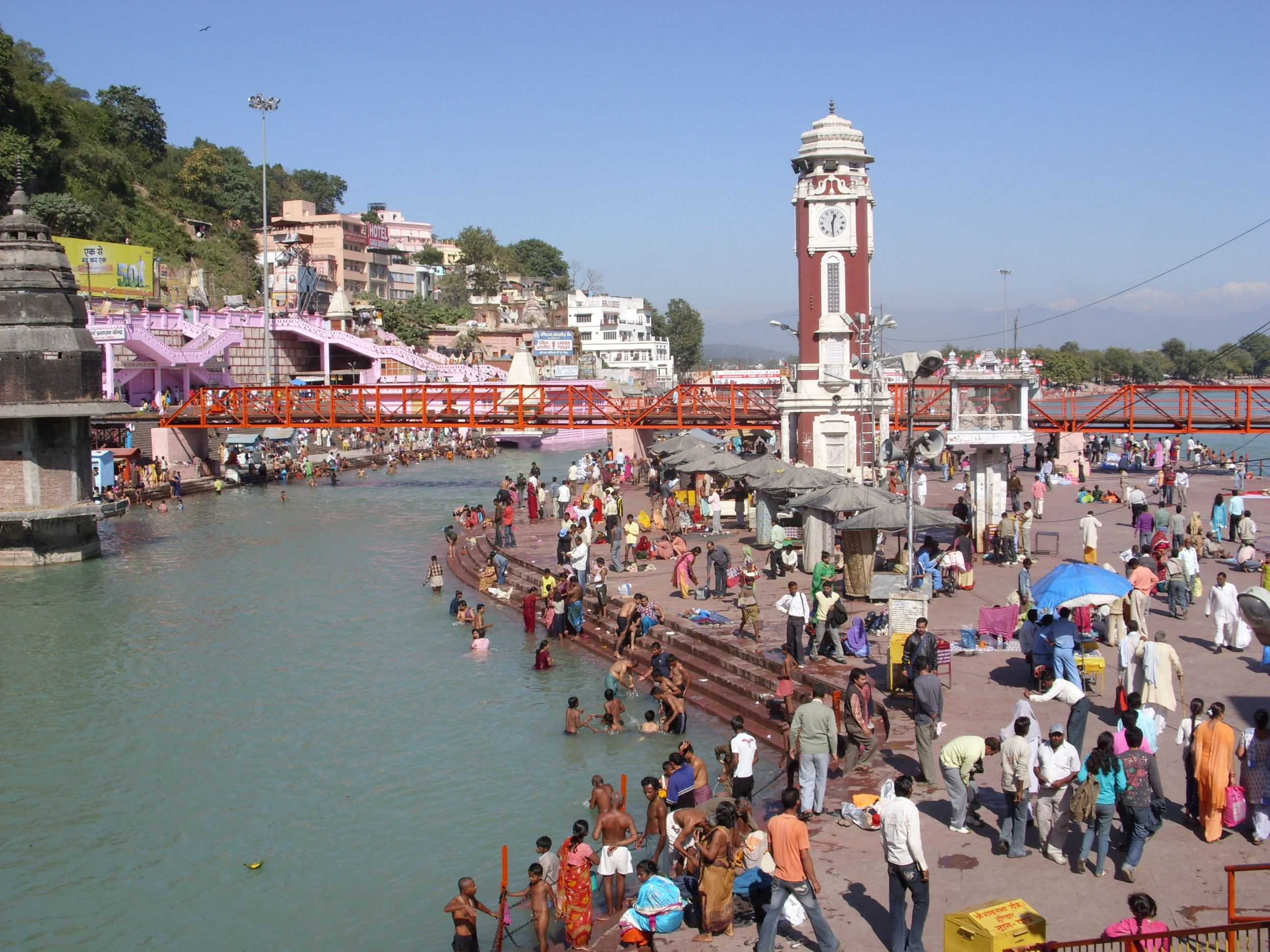
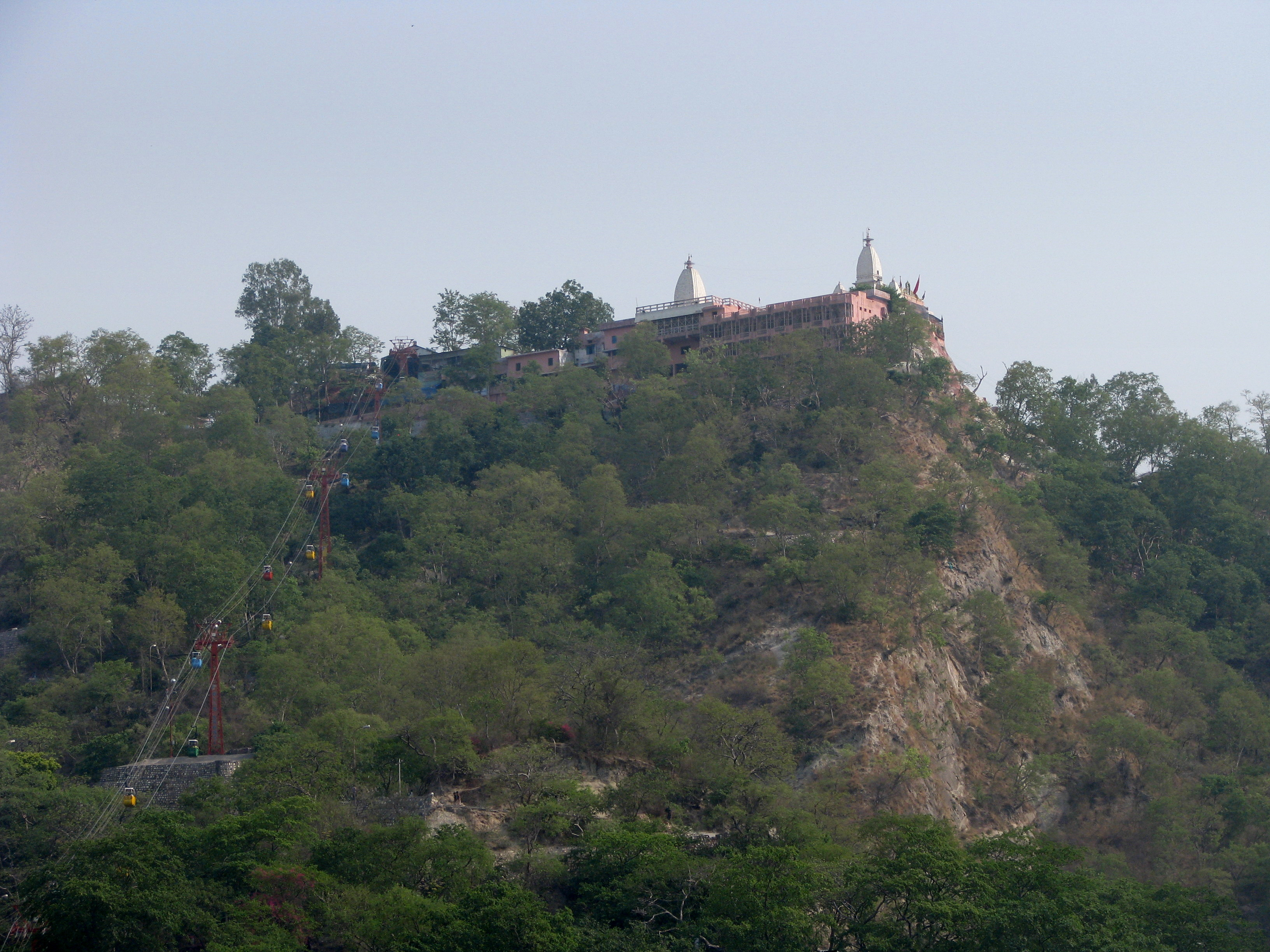
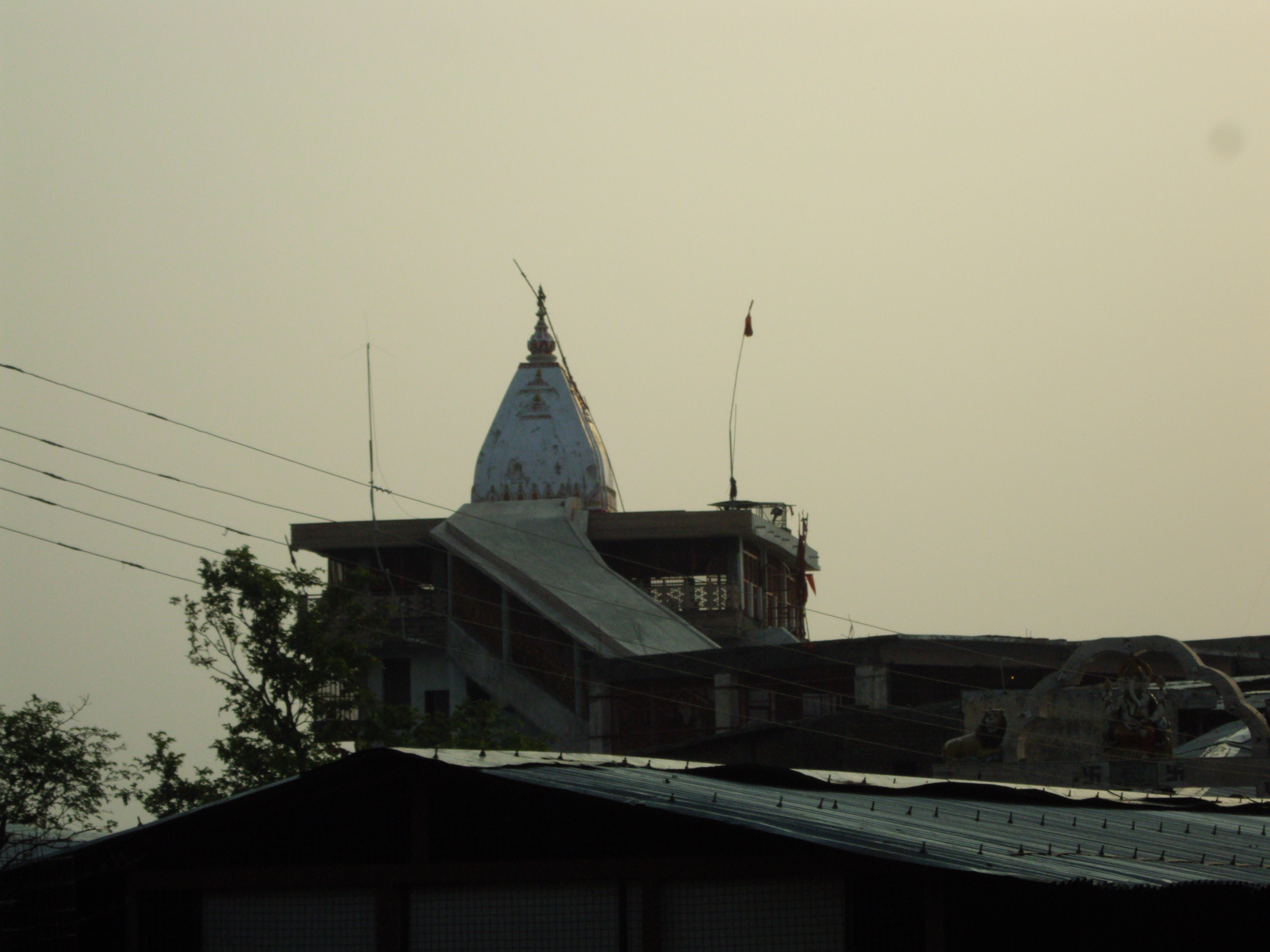
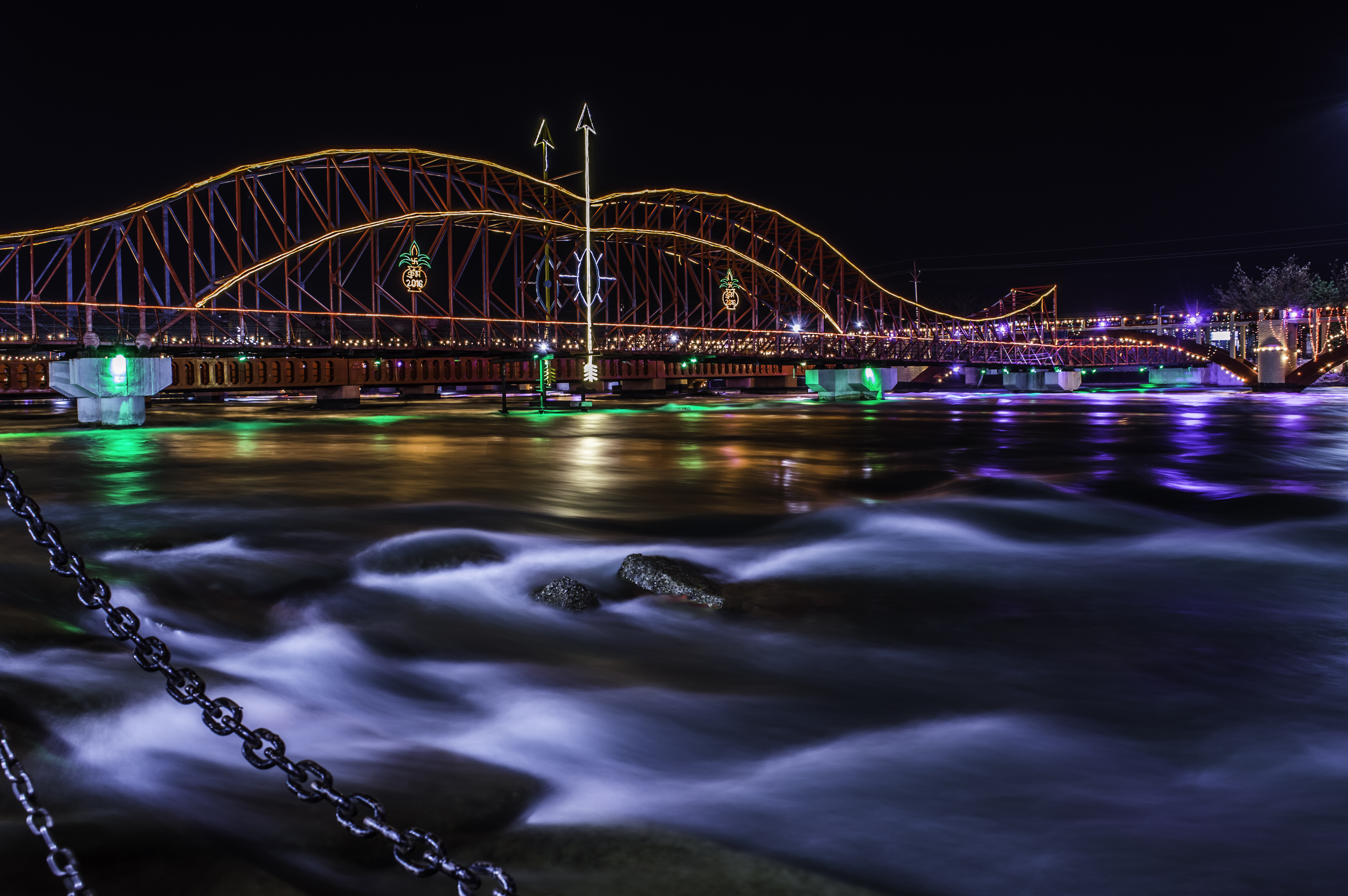
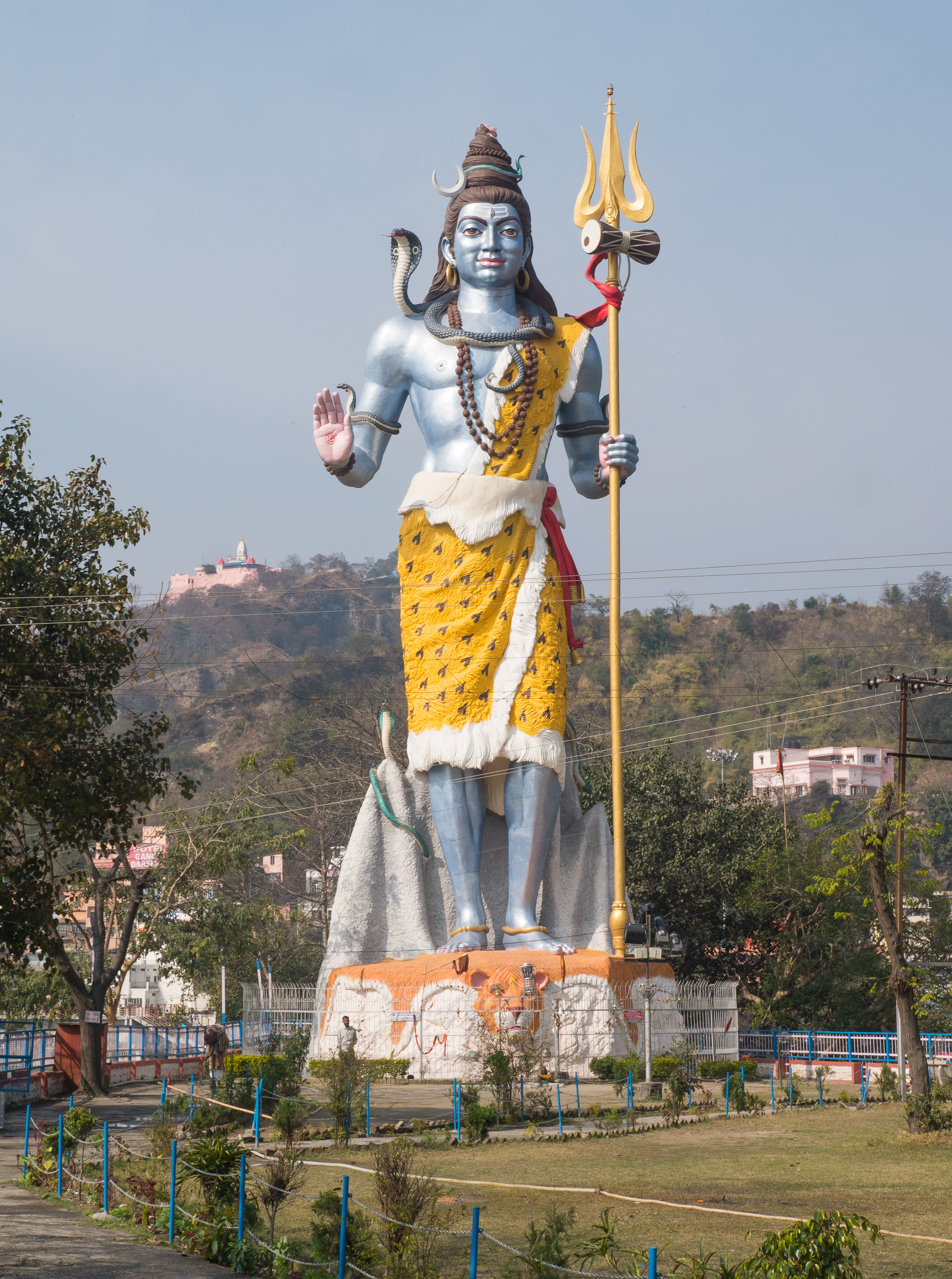
- Interactive map of Haridwar district
- Coordinates: 29.96°N 78.16°E
- Country: India
- State: Uttarakhand
- Headquarters: Haridwar

Government
  - District collector: Mayur Dixit IAS
  - SSP: Navneet Singh Bhullar IPS

Area
  - Total: 2,360 km^{2} (910 sq mi)
- Elevation: 249.7 m (819 ft)

Population (2011)
  - Total: 1,890,422
  - Density: 801/km^{2} (2,070/sq mi)
- Demonym: Haridwari

Languages
  - Official: Hindi
  - Native: Khariboli
- Time zone: UTC+5:30 (IST)
- Telephone code: 01334
- Vehicle registration: UK-08
- Website: haridwar.nic.in

Haridwar district (Hindi: [ɦəɾɪd̪waːɾ]), also spelled Hardwar, is part of Uttarakhand, India that lies in the Doab region, where people traditionally speak Khariboli. It is headquartered at Haridwar which is also its largest city. The district is ringed by the districts Dehradun in the north and east, Pauri Garhwal in the east and the Uttar Pradesh districts of Muzaffarnagar and Bijnor in the south and Saharanpur in the west.

Haridwar district came into existence on 28 December 1988 as part of Saharanpur Divisional Commissionary, On 24 September 1998 Uttar Pradesh Legislative Assembly passed the 'Uttar Pradesh Reorganisation Bill', 1998', eventually the Parliament also passed the Indian Federal Legislation – 'Uttar Pradesh Reorganisation Act 2000', and thus on 9 November 2000, Haridwar became part of the newly formed Uttarakhand (then Uttaranchal), the 27th state of the Republic of India.

As of 2011 it is the most populous district of Uttarakhand (out of 13). Important towns in the district are Haridwar, BHEL Ranipur, Roorkee, Manglaur, Jhabrera, Laksar, Landhaura, Dhandera, Bhagwanpur, and Bahadrabad.

== Geography ==
Haridwar district, covering an area of about 12.3 km per square, is in the southwestern part of Uttarakhand state of India. Its latitude and longitude are 29.96-degree north and 78.16-degree east respectively.

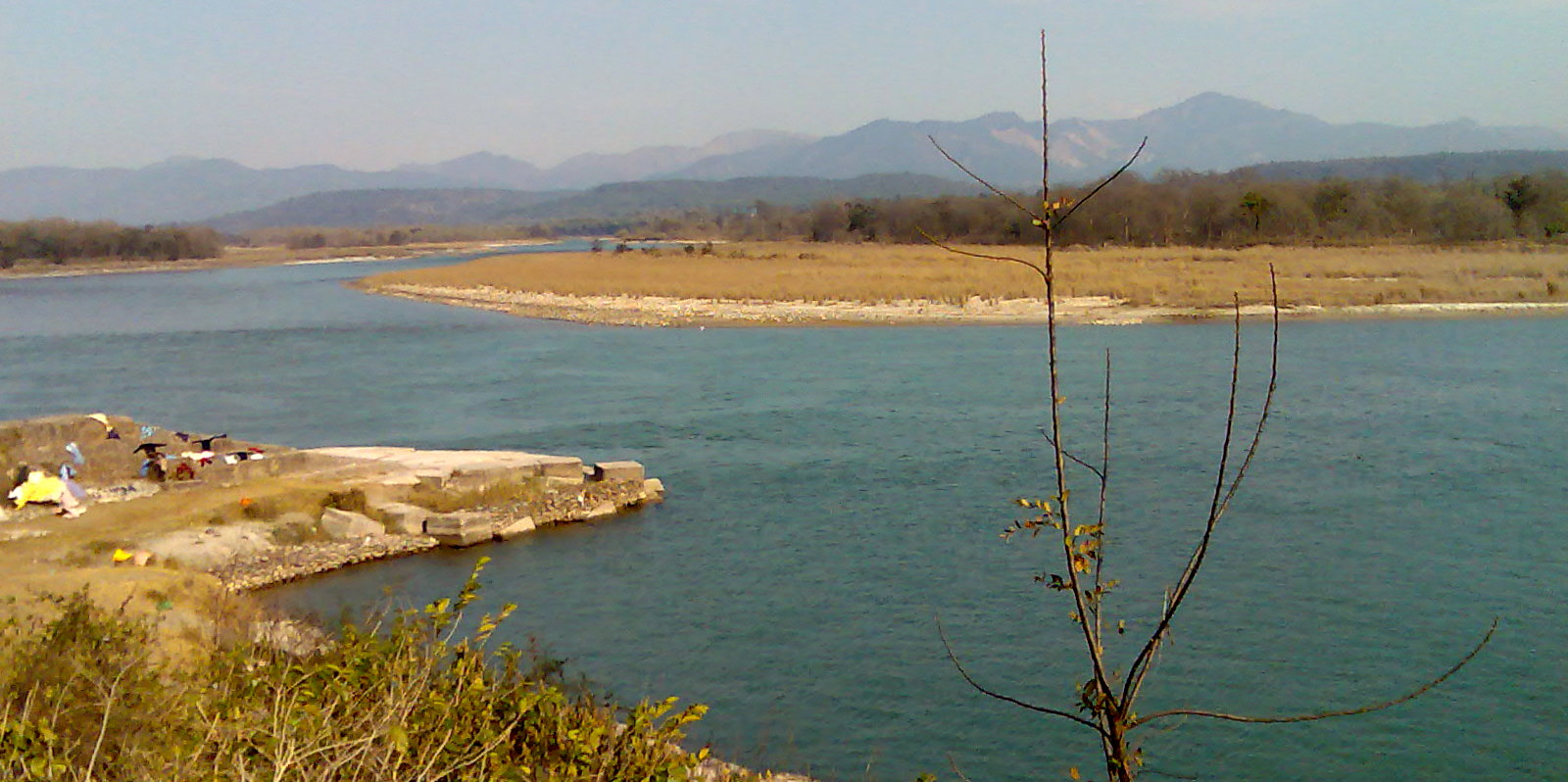
Neel Dhara Bird Sanctuary at the main Ganges Canal, before Bhimgoda barrage, also showing signs of an ancient port.

The river Ganges flows through it in a series of channels separated from each other called aits, most of which are wooded. Other minor seasonal streams are Ranipur Rao, Pathri Rao, Rawii Rao, Harnaui Rao, and Begam Nadi.

=== Climate ===
Average temperatures are mostly cooler than that of other parts of the country.

=== Nature and wildlife ===
The wooded Rajaji National Park, a wildlife sanctuary, is located within the bounds of the district and is accessible through different gates; Ranipur and Chilla Gates are just about 9 km from Haridwar. Sureshvari Devi Mandir, a temple of Goddess Sureshwari, is situated in Rajaji National Park. Cheela Dam is a picnic spot with a dam and a man-made lake nearby; elephants and other wild animals found here. Neel Dhara Pakshi Vihar is a bird sanctuary, situated on the main Ganges river, or Neel Dhara, at the Bhimgoda Barrage; it is visited by bird watchers and home to migratory birds during the winter season.

== History ==
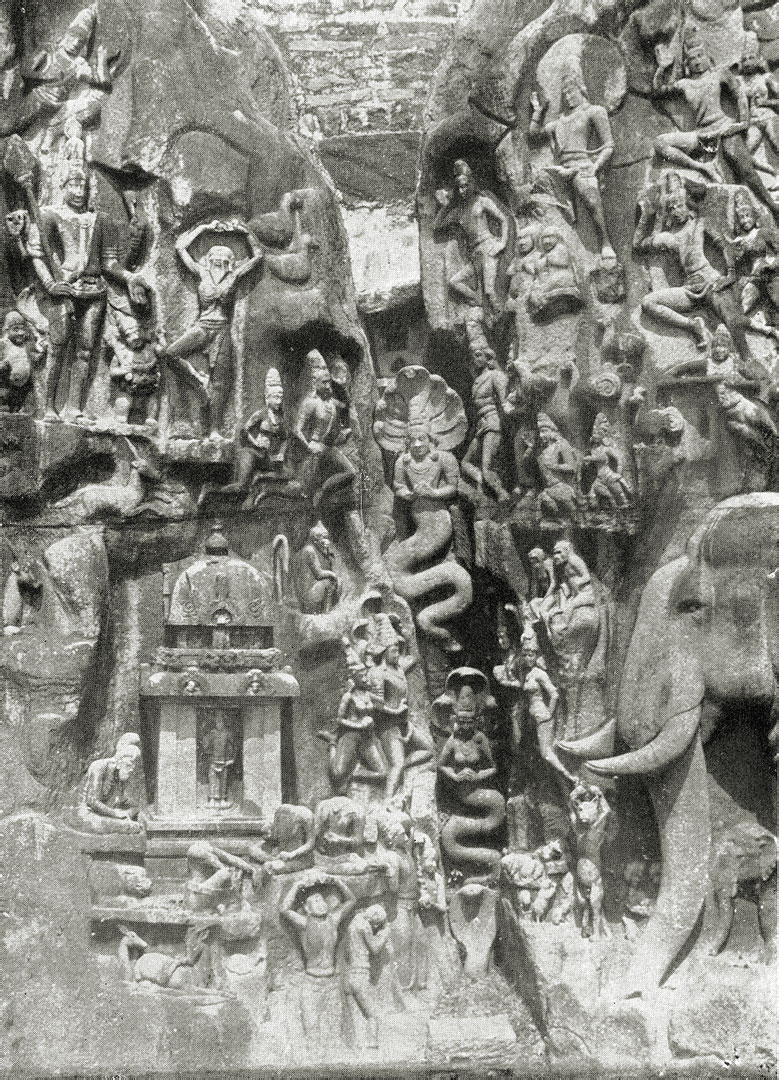
Prince Bhagirath in penance for the salvation of 60,000 of his ancestors.

=== Legends ===
A discourse of Bhishma in the Vana Parva (Tirtha-yatra Parva) Section XC of The Mahabharata notes:

O! Yudhishthira, the spot where Ganga rusheth past, cleaving the foremost of mountains which is frequented by Gandharvas and Yakshas and Rakshasas and Apsaras, and inhabited by hunters, and Kinnaras, is called Gangadwara (Haridwar). O! King, Sanatkumara regardeth that spot visited by Brahmarshis, as also the Tirtha Kanakhala (that is near to it), as sacred.

According to Hindu literature, Daksha Prajapati, father of Dakshayani, Shiva's first wife, was a ruler here. He performed a yagna, to which he deliberately did not invite Shiva. When he arrived uninvited, he was further insulted by the king, seeing which Sati felt infuriated and self-immolated herself in the yajna-fire. This site is regarded to be at the Sati Kund as it is called now, situated in Kankhal. The heart and navel of Sati are believed to have fallen at the place which is the present site of the Maya Devi Temple, Haridwar, dating back to the 11th century. Daksha was later killed by Virabhadra, born out of Shiva's anger. Subsequently, the king was brought to life and given a goat's head by Shiva.

The Skanda Purana mentions a legend, in which Chanda and Munda, the asuras who fought under Sumbha and Nisumbha were killed by goddess Chandi. This site, according to regional legend, is regarded to be at the location of the Chandi Devi Temple.

Sage Kapila is regarded to have had an ashram here. The legendary King Bhagiratha, the great-grandson of the Suryavamsha King Sagara, (an ancestor of Rama), is said to have brought the river Ganges down from heaven, through years of penance in Satya Yuga, for the salvation of 60,000 of his ancestors from the curse of the saint Kapila.

In the Vana Parva of the Mahabharata, where sage Dhaumya tells Yudhishthira about the tirthas of India, Gangadwara, i.e. Haridwar and Kankhal, have been referred to; the text also mentions that the sage Agastya performed a penance here, with the help of his wife, Lopamudra (the princess of Vidharba).

=== Ancient period ===
Archaeological findings have proved that terra cotta culture dating between 1700 BCE and 1200 BCE existed in this region.

Haridwar came under the rule of the Maurya Empire (322–185 BCE), and later under the Kushan Empire (c. 1st–3rd centuries).

It is believed that the sacred Ghat Har ki Pauri was constructed by King Vikramaditya (1st century BC) in memory of his brother Bharthari, who had come to Haridwar and meditated on the banks of holy Ganges and died here.

First ancient era written evidence of Haridwar is found in the accounts of a Chinese traveller, Huan Tsang, who visited India in 629 CE, during the reign of King Harshavardhan (590–647). He records Haridwar as 'Mo-yu-lo', the remains of which still exist at Mayapur, a little to the south of the modern Haridwar town; among the ruins are a fort and three temples, decorated with broken stone sculptures. He also mentions the presence of a temple, north of Mo-yu-lo called 'Gangadwara', Gateway of the Ganges.

It is believed that Adi Shankracharya had visited this region and the existing main statue of Chandi Devi Temple was established by him in 8th century A.D.

=== Medieval period ===
Haridwar region was a part of Delhi Sultanate. The armies of Emperor Timur (1336–1405), a Turkic conqueror, had passed through this region on 13 January 1399 to attack Delhi.

During his visit, first Sikh Guru, Guru Nanak (1469–1539) bathed at Haridwar's 'Kushwan Ghat', wherein the famous, 'watering the crops' episode took place. His visit is today commemorated by a gurudwara (Gurudwara Nanakwara); according to two Sikh Janamsakhis, this visit took place on the Baisakhi day in 1504 CE. He later had also visited Kankhal en route to Kotdwara in Garhwal. Besides this, third Sikh Guru, Sri Amar Das also visited Hardwar twenty two times during his lifetime.

The Mughal period: Ain-e-Akbari, written by Abul Fazal in the 16th century during the reign of Mughal Emperor Akbar, refers to Maya (Mayapur), known as Hardwar on the Ganges, as sacred city of Hindus. It also mentions that during his travels, and also while at home, Mughal Emperor Akbar drank water from the Ganges river, which he called 'the water of immortality'. Special people were stationed at Sorun and later Haridwar to dispatch water, in sealed jars, to wherever he was stationed.

It is said that Akbar's famous Commander-in-Chief, Raja Man Singh of Amber, laid the foundation of the present day city of Haridwar and also renovated the ghats at Har-ki-pauri. After his death, his ashes are also said to have been immersed at Brahma Kund by Mughal emperor Akbar himself. Brahma Kund (literally "Brahma's reservoir") at Har ki Pauri, Haridwar is one among the four sites where drops of the elixir of immortality, Amrita, accidentally spilled over from the pitcher, in which it was being carried away by the celestial bird Garuda, after the Samudra manthan by the Devas and the Asuras. The famous Kumbh Melas are held at these four sites in rotation, to commemorate the event. Thomas Coryat, an English traveller, who visited the city in the reign of Emperor Jahangir (1596–1627) mentions it as 'Haridwara', the capital of Shiva.

=== British Raj ===
Raja Ram Dayal Singh, a Gujjar ruler of Landhaura, ruled haridwar during the period before his death in 1813. British sources referred to him as the “Raja of Haridwar.” Ann Deane recorded Munglore as a fortified palace belonging to “Ramdial Sing, Rajah of Hurdwar” in her 1823 travel account.

Next the Gurjars of khubar clan established there Landaura state to rule in Gujarat region of the Saharanpur district. In the southern part of Uttarakhand in Haridwar district (earlier part of Saharanpur till 1988) the dominance and kingship was exercises by Gurjars, the area was under control of Panwar Gurjar chief in eastern Saharanpur including Haridwar in kingship of Raja Sabha Chandra of Jabarhera (Jhabrera). Gurjar of the Khubar (Panwar) gotra held more than 500 villages there in upper Doab, and that situation was confirmed in 1759 in a grant by a Rohilla governor of 505 villages and 31 hamlets to one Manohar Singh Gurjar (written in some records as Raja Nahar Singh son of Sabha Chandra). In 1792 Ram Dayal and his son Sawai Singh were ruling the area but due to some family reasons Ramdayal left Jhabrera and went to Landhaura village, now some villages were under the control of Raja Ramdayal Singh at Landhaura, and some under his son Sawai Singh at Jhabrera. Hence, there were two branches of Jhabrera State (riyasat) main branch at Jhabrera and the second one at Landhaura, both father and son were ruling simultaneously without any conflicts till the death of Raja Sawai Singh of Jabarhera in 1803. After the death of Sawai Singh total control of powers transferred to Ram Dayal Singh at Landhaura, but some villages were given to descendants of Sawai Singh and her widow to collect revenue.

By 1803 the Landhaura villages numbered 794 under Raja Ram Dayal Singh. Raja Ram Dayal Singh died on 29 March 1813. These holdings, at least those in the original grant made by the Rohilla governor, were initially recognized by the British in land settlements concluded with Ram Dayal and his heirs. As the years passed, more and more settlements appear to have been made with the village communities, however, and by 1850 little remained of the once vast estate of the Landhaura Gurjars.

Later a Gurjar king from Kunja village named Raja Vijay Singh Gurjar started a rebellion against the Britisher. He killed many Britisher with the help of Gurjars but a large army of the Britisher killed him and his commander Kalyan Singh Gurjar and set fire to Kunja village.

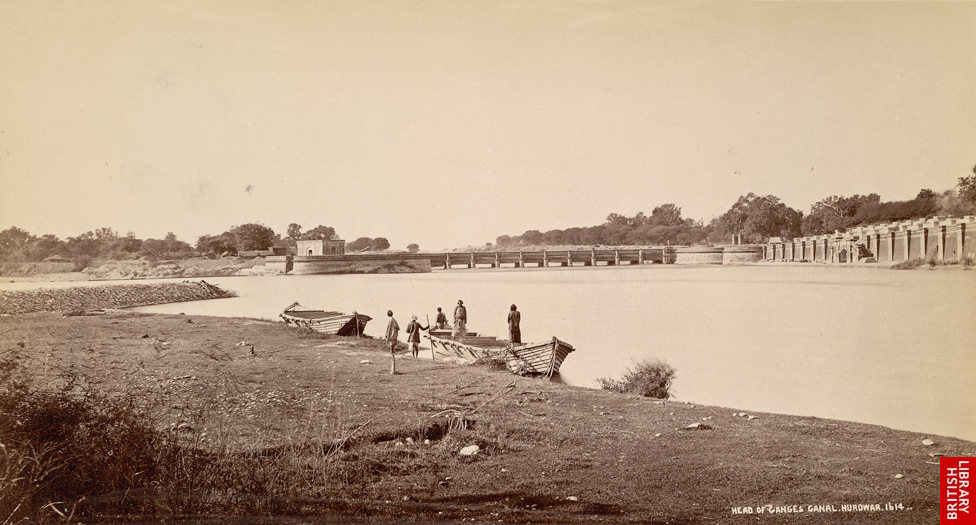
Head of Ganges Canal, Haridwar, ca 1894–1898.

The Ganges Canal was opened in 1854 after the work began in April 1842, prompted by the famine of 1837–38. The unique feature of the canal is the half-kilometre-long aqueduct over Solani river at Roorkee, which raises the canal 25 metres above the original river.

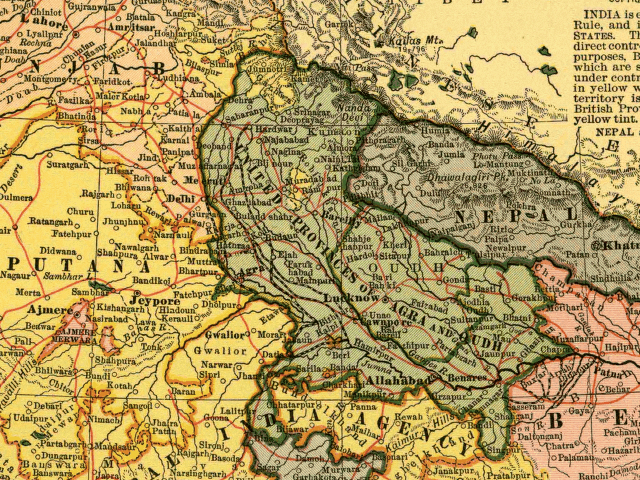
Haridwar as a part of the United Province, 1903

=== Post Independence period ===
In 1947, when India achieved independence from the British colonial subjugation, the region of present Haridwar district was a part of the then Saharanpur district, in the United Province of the British Raj; the province was renamed as Uttar Pradesh state of India. The Haridwar district came into existence on 28 December 1988 as part of Saharanpur Divisional Commissionary. On 24 September 1998 Uttar Pradesh Legislative Assembly passed the 'Uttar Pradesh Reorganisation Bill', 1998'; eventually the Parliament also passed the Indian Federal Legislation – 'Uttar Pradesh Reorganisation Act, 2000' – and thus on 9 November 2000, Haridwar district became part of the newly formed Uttarakhand (then Uttaranchal), the 27th state in the Republic of India.

== Demographics ==
Historical population
Year	Pop.	±% p.a.
1901	329,839	—
1911	311,436	−0.57%
1921	296,103	−0.50%
1931	329,914	+1.09%
1941	373,042	+1.24%
1951	427,574	+1.37%
1961	504,582	+1.67%
1971	670,764	+2.89%
1981	890,260	+2.87%
1991	1,124,488	+2.36%
2001	1,447,187	+2.56%
2011	1,890,422	+2.71%

=== Social groups ===
Haridwar has a multiethnic population spread across two geocultural regions: Khadar, and Bangar. A large portion of the population is Gurjars, Sainis, and Chauhans including Van Gurjars and Khadi Chauhans classified as Other Backward Classes(OBCs). Gurjars have villages in Jhabrera, Manglaur, Laksar, Khanpur, Roorkee, Bhagwanpur. Other the Sainis have villages in Roorkee, Laksar, Bhagwanpur, and Haridwar Rural. While Chauhans have villages in BHEL Ranipur, Haridwar Rural, Jwalapur and Laksar.

Other ethnic communities in the district are Brahmins, Rajputs, and Garhwalis are Classified as Forward caste and Scheduled Castes (SC) also have small population in Haridwar. Jats, Punjabis, Yadavs, Gadarias are also found here in small population.

Religions in Haridwar district (2011)
Religion	Percent
Hinduism	64.27%
Islam	34.28%
Sikhism	0.92%
Other or not stated	0.53%
Distribution of religions

According to the 2011 census Haridwar district has a population of 1,890,422, roughly equal to the nation of Lesotho or the US state of West Virginia. This gives it a ranking of 244th in India (out of a total of 640). The district has a population density of 817 inhabitants per square kilometre (2,120/sq mi) . Its population growth rate over the decade 2001–2011 was 30.63%. Haridwar has a sex ratio of 880 females for every 1000 males.

Languages of Haridwar district (2011)
1. Hindi (87.3%)
2. Urdu (9.66%)
3. Others (3.08%)

The main language of Haridwar is Hindi (87.3%), Urdu at 9.7%. Khariboli and Garhwali are also spoken by small minorities.

Hardwar district: mother-tongue of population, according to the 2011 Indian Census.
Mother tongue code	Mother tongue	People	Percentage
002007	Bengali	3,708	0.2%
006102	Bhojpuri	3,201	0.2%
006195	Garhwali	14,638	0.8%
006207	Gojri/Gujjari/Gujar	2,329	0.1%
006240	Hindi	1,649,529	87.3%
006340	Kumauni	1,805	0.1%
013071	Marathi	964	0.1%
014011	Nepali	1,055	0.1%
016038	Punjabi	15,570	0.8%
019014	Sindhi	1,094	0.1%
022015	Urdu	182,536	9.7%
053005	Gujari	6,270	0.3%
–	Others	7,723	0.4%
Total		1,890,422	100.0%

== Administrative background ==
The Haridwar district is ringed by Saharanpur in the west, Dehradun in the north west and north, Pauri Garhwal in the east, Muzaffarnagar in south and Bijnor in the south-east. Prior to its inclusion in the newly created state of Uttarakhand in 2000, this district was a part of Saharanpur Divisional Commissionary.

The district is administratively subdivided into four tehsils: Haridwar, Roorkee, Bhagwanpur and Laksar. It is further divided into six development blocks: Bhagwanpur, Roorkee, Narsan, Bahadrabad, Laksar, and Khanpur.

The district headquarters is in Roshnabad, at a distance of about 12 km from Haridwar railway station. The office of Chief Development Officer is in Vikas Bhawan, Roshnabad. The Collectorate, Vikas Bhawan, District Judiciary, S.S.P. Office, Police line, District Jail, District sports stadium, Jawahar Navodaya Vidyalaya etc. are the prime establishments of this area. Many other administration offices like Lok Seva Ayog and Sanskrit Academy are established here.

=== Assembly Constituencies ===
1. Haridwar
2. BHEL Ranipur
3. Jwalapur (SC)
4. Bhagwanpur (SC)
5. Jhabreda (SC)
6. Piran Kaliyar
7. Roorkee
8. Khanpur
9. Manglaur
10. Laksar
11. Haridwar Rural

=== Public representatives ===
The district has a single Parliamentary Constituency, and 11 Uttarakhand Legislative Assembly constituencies including, Haridwar, Haridwar Rural, BHEL Ranipur, Jwalapur, Bhagwanpur, Roorkee, Piran Kaliyar, Khanpur, Manglaur, Jhabrera and Laksar.

Current Member of Parliament (MP) from Haridwar (Lok Sabha constituency) is Nishank Pokhriyal, and Member of Uttarakhand Legislative Assembly from Haridwar City is 'Madan Kaushik'.

== Economy ==
Agriculture is the mainstay of this well irrigated district. Industrialisation had commenced with the establishment of Central Government owned Public Sector plants (PSUs) of [Indian Drugs and Pharmaceuticals Ltd (IDPL)] and Bharat Heavy Electricals Limited, in pre-Uttarakhand 1960s period. The State Industrial Development Corporation of Uttarakhand (SIDCUL) has now established one new 'industrial development zone' in the district, adjacent to Shivalik Nagar near Haridwar, to encourage industrialisation; with industrial giants like Hindustan Lever, Patanjali Group of companies, Dabur, Mahendra & Mahendra and Havells having moved in, it is making the desired progress. Not insignificant to the district's economy is the contribution of Hindu pilgrims who visit the holy places and attend the religious fairs in large numbers.

== Education ==
Haridwar district has several academic institutions, covering studies in sciences, engineering, technology and advanced research in the city of Roorkee.

Education in Sanskrit based classics and Hindu religious/cultural disciplines is an age-old tradition in the district, mainly centred in and around Haridwar city. Some of the important institutions of this genre are:

- Gurukul Kangri, situated in Kankhal, on the banks of river Ganges, on Haridwar-Jwalapur bypass road. It is one of the oldest Universities of India. It was founded in 1902, to study the unique Gurukul based education system. Here Ancient Vedic and Sanskrit literature, Ayurveda, Philosophy are part of the curriculum besides modern sciences and journalism. Its 'Archaeological Museum', established in 1945, houses some rare statues, coins, paintings, manuscripts and artefacts, starting from Harappa culture (c.2500–1500 BC). Mahatma Gandhi visited the campus three times, and stayed in its sprawling and serene campus for extended periods of time, most notably during the 1915 Kumbh mela.
- Vishwa Sanskrit Mahavidyalaya, Haridwar. A Sanskrit University, set up by Govt. of Uttarakhand, it is the only university in the world dedicated to studies of ancient Sanskrit scriptures and books. Its curriculum also covers ancient Hindu rituals, traditions and culture, and it boasts of a building inspired by ancient Hindu architecture style.
- State Ayuevedic College & Hospital Rishikul, Haridwar, is the oldest Ayurvedic Medical College of India. It is situated near Devpura in Haridwar on the banks of Upper Ganges Canal. It is also providing postgraduate education for Ayurveda. Soon it will be transformed as the first Ayuevedic University of Uttarakhand.
- Govt Ayurvedic College & Hospital, Gurukul Kangri of HNB Garhwal University is also one of the oldest Ayurvedic medical colleges in India. It is situated in Gurukul Kangri University Campus.
- Dev Sanskriti Vishwavidyalaya: established in 2002 by the act of the Uttarnchal Government is a fully residential university. Run by Sri Vedmata Gayatri Trust, Shantikunj Haridwar (headquarters of All World Gayatri Pariwar), it provides various degree, diploma and certificate courses in areas like Yogic Science, Alternative Therapy, Indian Culture, Tourism, Rural Management, Theology (Dharm Vigyan), Spiritual Counseling etc. It also provides distance learning courses.
- Sheel Institute Situated in Shivalik Nagar, 10 km (6.2 mi) from Haridwar city. one of the Best Computer Institute in Haridwar.

Modern Ashrams are also being established in the district for imparting training in yoga and meditation to people coming now from near and far, including foreign countries of the West :

- Shantikunj Ashram provides a 9 days camp and one month / three months courses covering yoga, meditation, art of living, scientific spirituality etc.

== Religious festivals and fairs ==
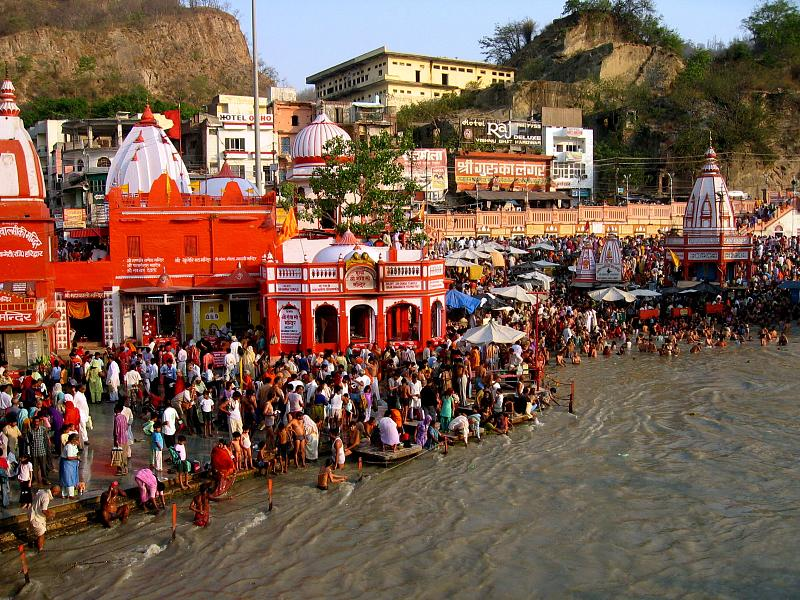
Ganga Dashara, at Haridwar

Being a place of intense religious significance, Haridwar also hosts several religious festivals throughout the year; popular among them are the Kavad Mela, Somvati Amavasya Mela, Ganga Dashara, Gughal Mela, in which around 2–2.5 million people take part.

Apart from these, there is the mammoth Kumbh Mela which takes place once in every twelve years, when the planet Jupiter (Brihaspati) comes into the sign Aquarius (Kumbha). First written evidence of the Kumbha Mela can be found in the accounts of Chinese traveller Huan Tsang or Xuanzang (602 – 664 A.D.), who visited India in 629 CE. The 1998 Maha Kumbh Mela saw over 80 million pilgrims visiting this city, to take a dip in the holy river Ganges.

== Places of pilgrimage ==
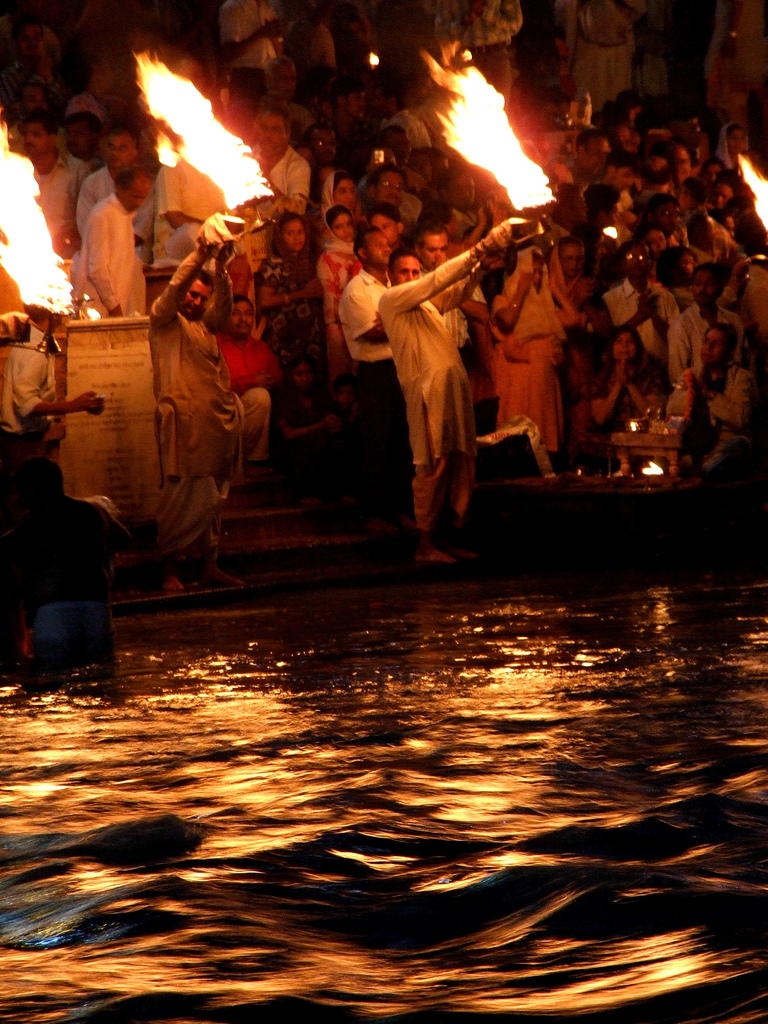
View of the 'Evening Aarti' at Har-ki-Pauri

Har ki Pauri: Is a holiest spots on earth for the Hindus, this ancient bathing ghat (Steps) is of prime importance. A majority of the present ghats were largely developed in the 1800s.

Sati Kund: It is the well-known mythological Sati immolation heritage situated in Kankhal.

Daksheswara Mahadev Temple: The ancient temple of Daksha, is situated in the south of Kankhal town and is a tribute to the legends of Sati's self-immolated and king Daksha's death and later life with a goat's head.

Maya Devi Temple: This temple of the Adhisthatri deity of Haridwar is considered one of the Siddhapeethas and is said to be the place where the heart and navel of Goddess Sati had fallen. It is one of the few ancient temples still standing in Haridwar, along with Narayani Shila Temple and Bhairav Temple.

Sapt Rishi Ashram and Sapt Rishi Sarovar, where the Ganges split herself into seven currents so that seven great sages on its bank would not be disturbed by the flow.

Bhimgoda Tank: This tank, where Bhima is said to have drawn water from the rocks by thrusting his knee into the ground, is situated at a distance of about 1 km from Har-ki-Pauri.

Chandi Devi Temple: The present temple, commemorating the ancient Chandi legend, was constructed in 1929 CE by the Dogra king of Kashmir, Suchat Singh; it can also be reached through a ropeway.

Mansa Devi Temple: The temple dedicated to Manasa devi, a form of Shakti draws many pilgrims.

Piran Kaliyar Sharif: This famous 'Dargah' (Shrine) of Hazrat Alauddin Sabir Kaliyari was built by Ibrahim Lodhi, a Delhi Sultanate ruler. Also known as Sarkar Sabir Pak, it is located in Kaliyar village, 7 km from Roorkee. It is visited by devotees from all over the world, during the annual 'Urs' festival, which is celebrated from 1st day (of sighting the new moon) to 16th day of Rabee-ul-awwal month of Islamic calendar.

Shantikunj: Shantikunj is headquarters of spiritual and social organisation All World Gayatri Pariwar (AWGP).

== Transportation ==
National Highway 58, between Delhi and Mana Pass, passes through Haridwar. Indian Railways links Haridwar Railway Station to all parts of India. The nearest airport is Jolly Grant Airport, Dehradun, 45 kilometres from Haridwar, though Indira Gandhi International Airport in New Delhi is preferred.
