= Virbhadra =

- Town
- Location in Uttarakhand, India Virbhadra (India)
- Coordinates: 30.07°N 78.28°E
- Country: India
- State: Uttarakhand
- District: Dehradun
- Elevation: 330 m (1,080 ft)

Population (2011)
  - Total: 13,271

Languages
  - Official: Hindi
  - Native: Garhwali, Khariboli
- Time zone: UTC+5:30 (IST)
- PIN: 249202
- Telephone code: 0135
- Vehicle registration: UK
- Website: uk.gov.in

Virbhadra is a town in Dehradun district in the Indian state of Uttarakhand, located close to the pilgrimage town of Rishikesh. It is most known as the factory township of Indian Drugs and Pharmaceuticals Limited, Rishikesh plant (IDPL), a Government of India undertaking, established in 1967, with about 2800 houses, with Government Inter College and a Kendriya Vidyalaya, established in 1976 with support from IDPL administration but get closed in 2000, again reestablished by initiative of centre government in same campus in 2003 The town also has a historical Virbhadra Temple, Neem Karoli Baba Ashram and a Hanuman Mandir. Very near to the town is the Pashulok Barrage which acts as a water reservoir for the Chilla Hydro power plant. The motorable road to the Neelkanth Mahadev Temple passes along the top of the dam.A book on IDPL township titled "Township ke Din" was written by writer Dr Harish Yadav which depicts the life of IDPL Virbhadra Township.

== Geography ==
Virbhadra is located at 30.07°N 78.28°E. It has an average elevation of 330 metres (1,083 feet).

== History ==
It is named after Virabhadra, an avatar created through the wrath of Shiva after the yajña of Daksha, at Kankhal. An ancient Shiva temple known as Virbhadra Temple, dedicated to him, is situated within the town. Virbhadra is famous for the first government pharmaceutical plant (producing Antibiotics), Indian Drugs and Pharmaceutical Limited (IDPL).

== Demographics ==
As of 2011 India census, Virbhadra had a population of 13,271. Males constitute 52% of the population and females 48%. Virbhadra has an average literacy rate of 81%, higher than the national average of 74.04%: male literacy is 86%, and female literacy is 75%. In Virbhadra, 8% of the population is under 6 years of age.
