= Panchayati Akhara Nirmal =

Religious organization (1862)

Shri Panchayati Nirmal Akhara
- Formation: 7 August 1862
- Founder: Mahitab Singh
- Founded at: Chanarthalian di Haveli, Patiala, Patiala State, Cis-Sutlej States, Punjab, British India
- Legal status: Akhara
- Headquarters: Sati Ghat Road, Mohalla Maiyapur (Mohalla Miaria), Kankhal, Haridwar, Uttarakhand, 249408, India
- Sri Mahant: Swami Gyanadev Singh Maharaj
- Parent organization: Akhil Bharatiya Akhara Parishad
- Website: nirmalakhara.org
- Formerly called: Dharam Dhuja Akhara Guru Gobind Singh Ji

The Panchayati Akhara Nirmal or Nirmal Panchayati Akhara is an organization (akhara) based in Haridwar, India associated with the Nirmala sampardya. It is the central organization of the Nirmalas and was founded in 1862 in Patiala. Before its establishment, there was no central authority of the Nirmalas. It is one of the thirteen akharas that participate in the Kumbh Mela. It is part of the Akhil Bharatiya Akhara Parishad, alongside other akharas that belong to the Shaivite, Vaishnavite, and Udasi traditions. It was originally known as the Dharamdhaja Panchayati Akhara Nirmala. A notable figure associated with the akhara was Tara Singh Narotam.

== History ==
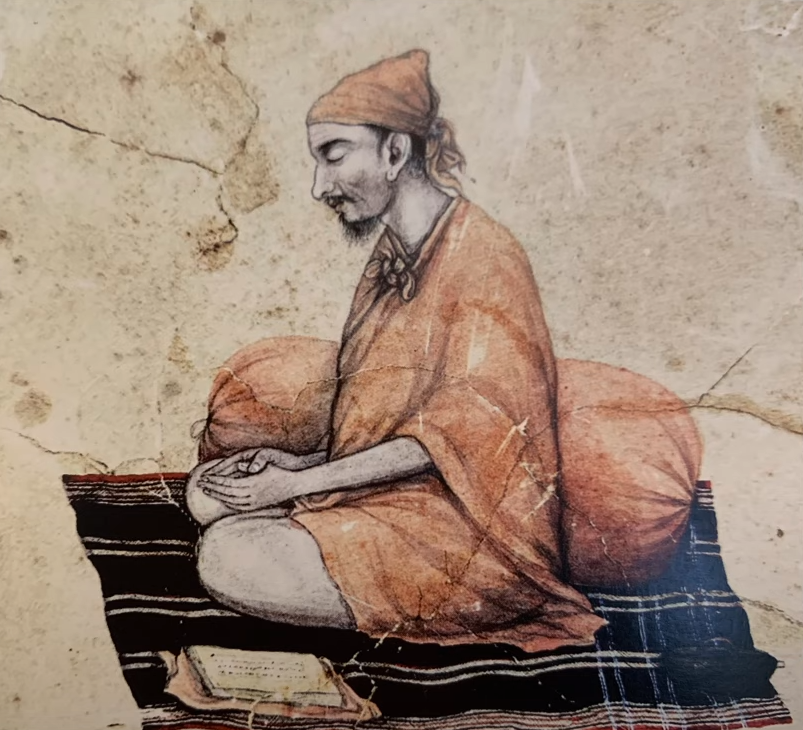
Painting of a Nirmala Sikh, circa 19th century

It had been a tradition for various ascetic, religious, Indic sects of sadhus, such as the Dasnamis, Sannyasis, Bairagis, Ramanandis, Nagas, and Udasis, to found akharas and deras. The Nirmala sants also had their own centres located around India. The Udasis had founded a panchaiti akhara in 1779 at Prayag (Allahabad), with branches based out of Kashi (Varanasi) and Kankhal. The general Nirmala sect claims to have been founded by Guru Nanak in 1564, who they claim bestowed upon Bhai Bhagirath the Mul Mantar and Nirmal Vakh. Furthermore, the Nirmalas believe that Guru Gobind Singh in 1686 dispatched five Sikh men, namely Bir Singh, Gainda Singh, Karam Singh, Ram Singh, and Saina Singh, known as the Panch Nirmal Gaurik, to Kashi (Varanasi) to study Sanskrit and Hindu scriptures. The Brahmins rejected the five men due to them not being Brahmins (making them ineligible to study the Vedas), therefore Guru Gobind Singh made them dress in saffron and proclaimed them to be sadhus, showing that one did not have to belong to a particular caste to study the Vedas or use Sanskrit. The five men studied the Vedas, Vedangas, Puranas, Dharma-shastras, and Itihases at Kashi for thirteen years, returning to Anandpur Sahib, where they were bestowed with the title Nirmal.

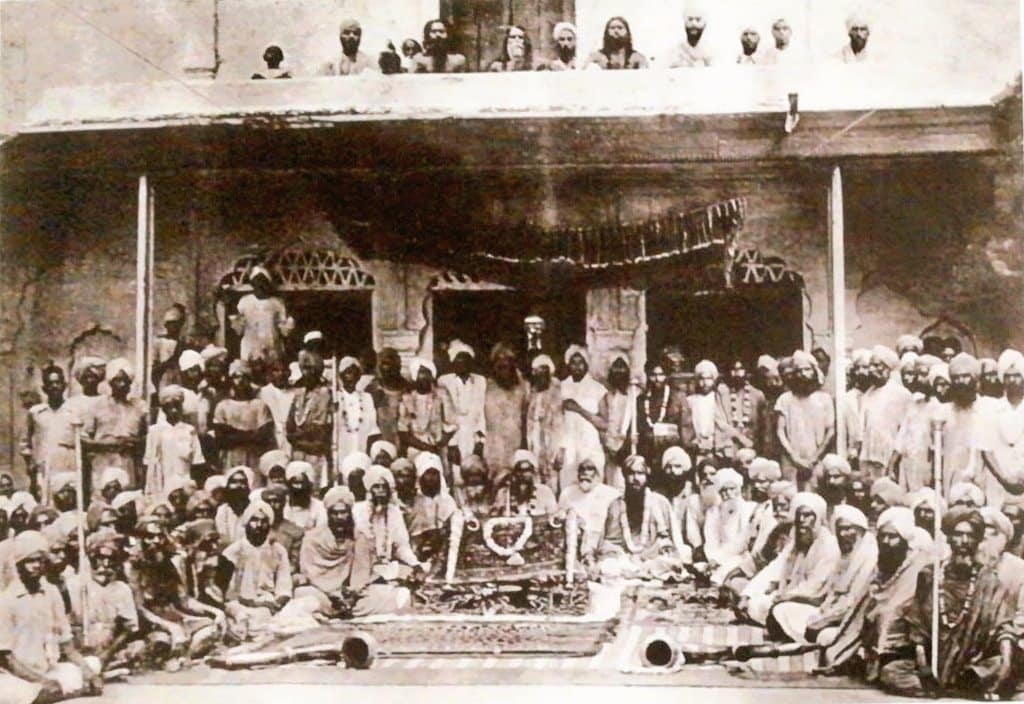
Photograph of the Dharam Duja Akhara in Patiala, ca.1900

In the late 18th century, the Nirmalas and 11,000–12,000 Sikh horseman of Raja Sahib Singh of Patiala participated in the Kumbh at Haridwar but they had a clash with the Nagas, who protested their presence and their occupation of the ghats. The decision to establish an official Nirmala akhara was part of the agreement between the disputing parties. The idea of the Nirmalas having their own panchaiti akhara was first considered in 1807. At the 1855 Kumbh, the Nirmalas elected Mahitab Singh (also spelt Mehtab Singh) as their head or principal priest (Sri Mahant). Mahitab Singh had been patronized by the cis-Sutlej states, namely Patiala, Jind, and Nabha, with the rulers of those three states founding the Chanarthalian di Haveli based in Patiala as a centre for the Nirmalas to be based out of, providing financial and land grants for its functioning.

Historically this specific Nirmala organization was founded at Patiala in 1862. Other sources place its founding in 1861. The inauguration of the organization, initially known as the Dharam Dhuja Akhara Guru Gobind Singh Ji, occurred on 7 August 1862 and its constitution, the Dastur ul-'Amal, was compiled. A yellow flag bearing a khanda ensign was adopted as the Dharma Dhvaja. Four nomadic akharas were established for each of the four directions, each headed by a mahant. Some sources instead name Durga Singh Maharaj as the founder of the organization. The constitution ruled that offerings and donations could not be used for the personal benefit of mahants but rather had to be given to the organization as a whole and that new members had to swear upon the Guru Granth Sahib. Furthermore, it required that all assistance given to the poor be noted and that accounts by the organization would be annually checked by the Sri Mahant on an annual basis. All members had to remain a celebrate and wear ochre-coloured clothing. Finally, the trio of the cis-Sutej states could intervene in the affairs of the akhara by removing any priest that they believed was acting against its constitution.

The founding code of conduct of the akhara consisted of a selection of the following fifteen clauses (amongst many others not included here):

1. Mahtab Singh would be the leader (Sri Mahant) of the akhara and will be succeeded by his chosen successor
2. The 82,000 rupee endowment will be managed and used for trade and investing
3. Sikh sadhus who join the akhara will give all their private funds and money to the treasury of the institution and they shall swear an oath on the Guru Granth Sahib
4. The akhara's mission is to propagate the teachings of Guru Nanak and tell the public about the merits of pilgrimage, charity, and giving honour to saints
5. A touring unit will be maintained, composed of 20–50 Nirmalas consisting of a head mahant, granthi, pujari, pandit or giani, kothari (steward), two karbaris (attendants), and sri bhandari (cook)
6. Before the touring unit visits a settlement, the headmen of such places should be given notice at least two days in advance
7. The touring unit is not allowed to camp within the confines of a village it is visiting
8. Kirtan performances and reverence of the Guru Granth Sahib will be conducted twice daily in the morning and evening
9. All gifts from devotees are to be accepted with acclaim, even humble ones
10. The touring unit is not allowed to visit the same locality more than once in a set period of twelve years
11. During the four-month rainy season, it will stay in Patiala or another comparable large town
12. All tours are to be recorded in writing
13. The touring unit must participate during the Kumbh Mela and Ardh Kumbh Mela in either Haridwar, Prayag, Nasik, or Ujjain
14. Sadhus associated with the institution must wear saffron-coloured clothing or at least a saffron-coloured turban
15. Nirmalas are to be contented and virtuous

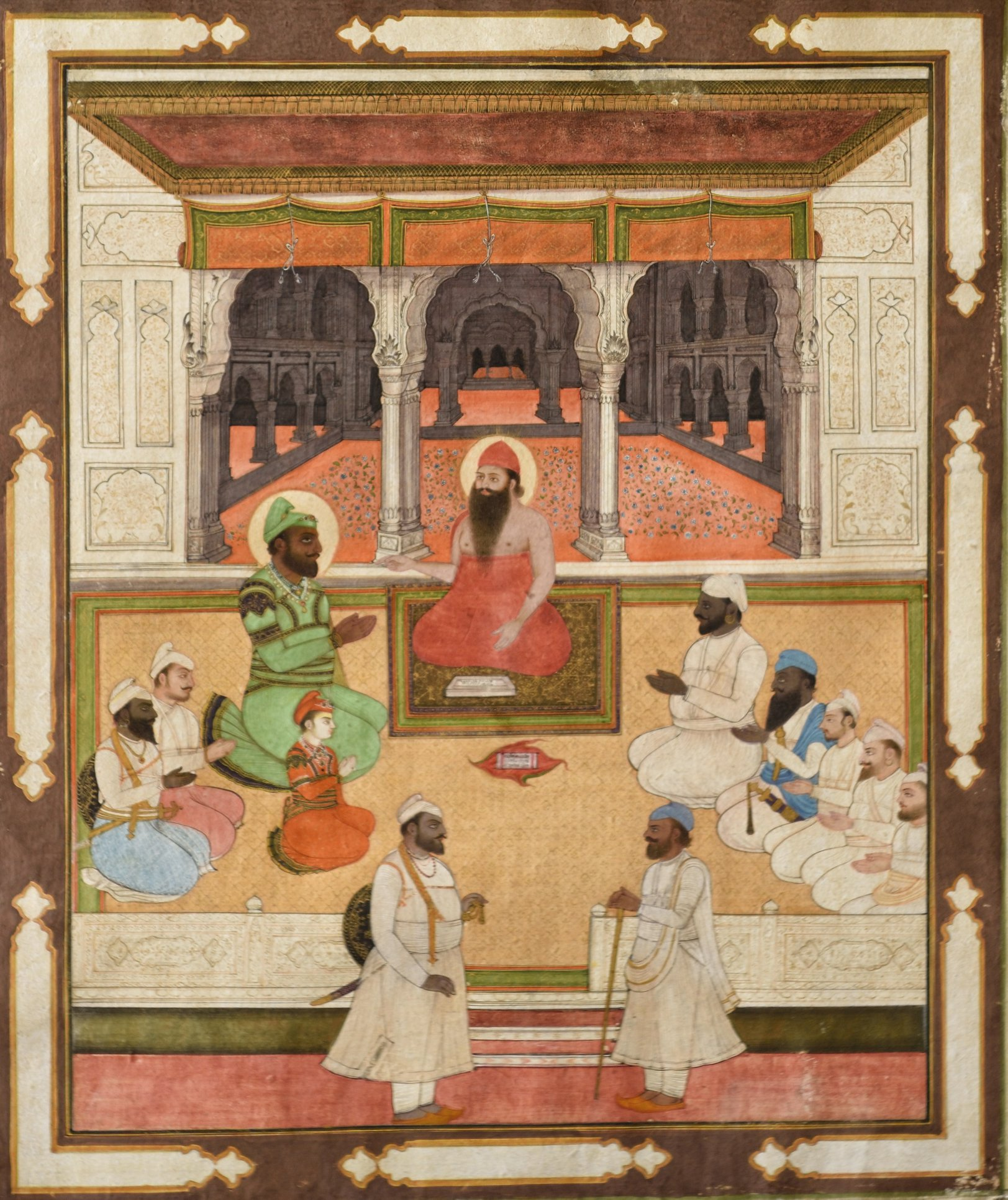
Maharajah Karam Singh of Patiala and his son Narinder Singh with a Nirmala holy man, Northern India or Pakistan, 19th century, Opaque watercolours on paper, 36 × 42 cm, Kapany Collection.

Mahitab Singh after his death was succeeded as head of the organization in 1871 by Pandit Ram Singh Kuberia. The akhara grew in influence during the tenure of Ram Singh, acquiring additional properties in Kankhal to serve as the base for the Nirmalas. The akhara which was originally based in Patiala and Kankhal can be found operating in Haridwar, Prayag (Allahabad), Ujjain, Triyambak (Nashik), Kurukshetra, Patna, and other locations. While Giani Balwant Singh maintains that Pandit Ram Singh Kuberia was in office as the head mahant of the akhara from 1871 until his death in 1896, Rattan Singh Jaggi instead states that Ram Singh had given the seat of the sri mahant to Tara Singh Narotam in 1875.

The organization participated in the 2025 Maha Kumbh. They entered the camp on 11 January 2025 and the Dharmadhwaja flag was installed the following day on 12 January 2025. They were the last akhara of the akharas of the Kumbh to participate in the bathing ceremony.

== Beliefs and practices ==
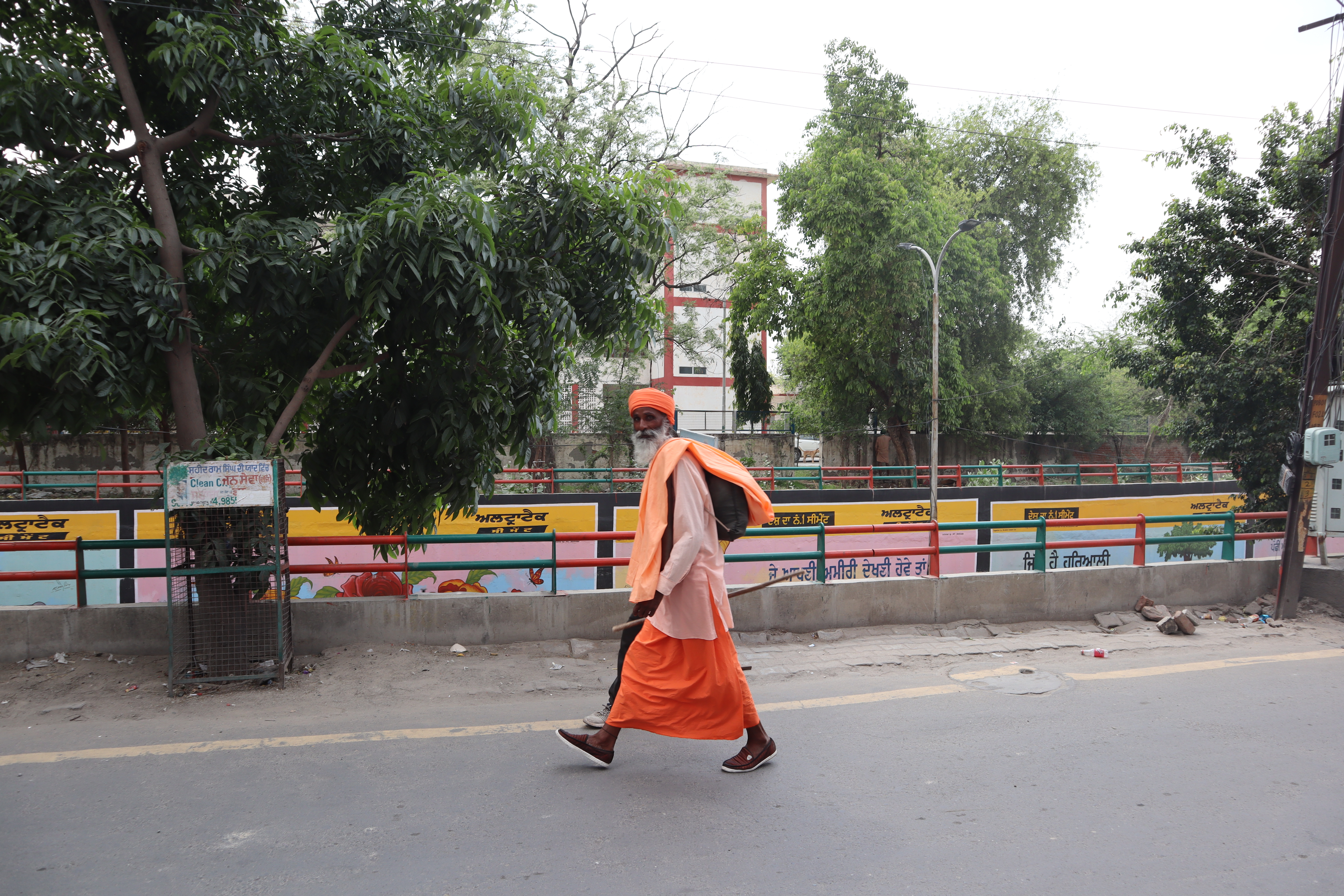
Photograph of a Nirmala Sikh man walking the streets of Bathinda, Bathinda district, Punjab, India, April 2023

The organization mixes Vedic thought with Sikh gurbani, effectively mixing Hinduism and Sikhism together. They maintain a belief in the ten Sikh gurus and the Guru Granth Sahib. Recitation of the Guru Granth Sahib begins on Brahma Muhurta. The sadhus of the akhara remained clothed (as opposed to being a naga-sadhu) and refrain from intoxication, spreading of ash on the body, or sacred fires. Initiates are to maintain the 5Ks of Sikhism and the Guru Granth Sahib is enthroned at their centres and a granthi caretakes its recitation, being akin to a mainstream Sikh gurdwara in this regard. The Nirmal akhara differs from the Shaivite and Vaishnavite akharas as its members are to maintain uncut hair (kesh) and wear a dastar (turban), meanwhile those other akharas have their initiates and members shave their head. Furthermore, its Nishan Sahib (flag) is placed outside the akhara rather than at its internal centre. All castes are welcome to the akhara. At the beginning of a Kumbh, a Dharmadhwaja flag is installed at the akhara before sadhus and sants enter the encampment, who sit under it to perform rituals. A temple dedicated to a Ishtadev is also installed under the flag. Aside from the Guru Granth Sahib, they also venerate the Vedas, Bhagavad Gita, and Upanishads.

== Structure ==
The akhara consists of five Mahamandaleshwars and also consists of a governing body comosed of 25–26 religious figures. Some of the positions in the functioning of the akhara are the president, secretary, treasurer (Kothari), and Mukami Mahants. The smallest unit of the akhara is that of a Vidyarathi (spiritual student). The akhara has thirty-two branches across India, while other sources give a range of 30–35 branches across India. Around 15,000 sadhus across India are affiliated with the organization. It maintains a mobile, touring unit.

Major positions, such as the Mahant, Kothari, and Sant, within the organizations are given to ascetics on criteria based upon the concepts of Shastri and Gyani, with knowledge on topics related to Sanskrit, Shakhi, the Guru Granth Sahib, and the Dasam Granth being required. In 2019, the head of the group was Mahant Gurudev Singhji Vendantacharya.

=== Current positions ===
The current key members and their positions are as follows:

- Sri Mahant: Swami Gyanadev Singh Maharaj
- Mahamandaleshwar of the Shri Panchayati Nirmal Akhara: Sakshi Maharaj
- Secretary Mahant: Devendra Singh Shastri
- Kothari Mahant: Jaswinder Singh Shastri
- Chief Mahant: Laxman Singh
- Mahant: Gyan Singh

== List of heads ==
The leaders of the group, known as a Sri Mahant, are as follows:

- Mahitab Singh (1862–1871)
- Pandit Ram Singh Kuberia (1871–1875)
- Pandit Tara Singh Narotam (1875–1891)

== Controversy ==
The group was accused in 2017–2018 of selling land it received as donations to builders. Mahant Gyan Dev Singh expelled Mahant Gopal Singh from his Kothari Mahant position due to the allegations against him over misuse of the akhara's properties.
