= Virbhadra Temple =

Coordinates: 30.067533°N 78.2800841°E

Religion
- Affiliation: Hinduism
- District: Dehradun

Location
- State: Uttarakhand
- Country: India
- Interactive map of Virbhadra Temple

Virbhadra Temple is dedicated to Lord Shiva, located at Virbhadra Town near Rishikesh, Uttarakhand. It is a 1,300-year-old temple, where Virbhadra, an avatar of Lord Shiva is worshiped. Night long jagran and special poojas are held on the occasion of Shivratri & Sawaan. A mela is also held to coincide with the Mahashivratri festival. Virbhadra Temple Myths and Legends Virabhadra is an avatar of Lord Shiva who was created by him in anger. The story in Hindu mythology describes that when Goddess Uma (Sati) felt insulted by her father Daksh Prajapati at Kankhal, Haridwar for not inviting her husband Lord Shiva for Yagya, she jumped into the Yagya Kund to immolate herself for her husband's dishonor. When Lord Shiva heard this news he became angry, pulled out his hair and thrashed on the ground. Consequently, Lord Virbhadra was born.

The temple is located 2 km from Neelkanth-Rishikesh Highway. It can be reached by local Veerbhadra railway station on the highway which is 2 km away from the temple. Jolly Grant Airport, Dehradun is 25 km away.

== Archaeology ==
Excavation done here in the early 1970s indicated continuous occupation of the site from about the 2nd to the 8th centuries. Three phases were described: an early phase, lasting until the 3rd century; a middle phase, around the 4th and 5th centuries; and a late phase, around the 7th and 8th centuries. In the area close to the riverbank (excavated by trench VBA-II), structures were made of baked bricks, indicating that this may have been where the more affluent residents lived, while farther away (excavated by trench VBA-I), houses were built haphazardly from mud bricks along with boulders and pebbles, indicating that this may have been where less affluent residents lived. Two sizeable temples, which archaeologists referred to as "Structure 1" and "Structure 2", were also built in the area close to the riverbank. Structure 1, with a linga and a plain façade, was built during the middle phase and remained active in the late phase. Structure 2 was built a short distance to the south of Structure 1, on the same alignment, during the late phase.

Various animal bones were found among the earliest layer, mostly from trench VBA-I. None were found in the middle or late layers, indicating a possible shift toward vegetarianism during this period, possibly related to the establishment of the two temples.

== See also ==
- Daksheswar Mahadev Temple, Kankhal
- Nilkanth Mahadev
- Rishikesh
