= Daksheswar Mahadev Temple =

Hindu Temple in Uttarakhand

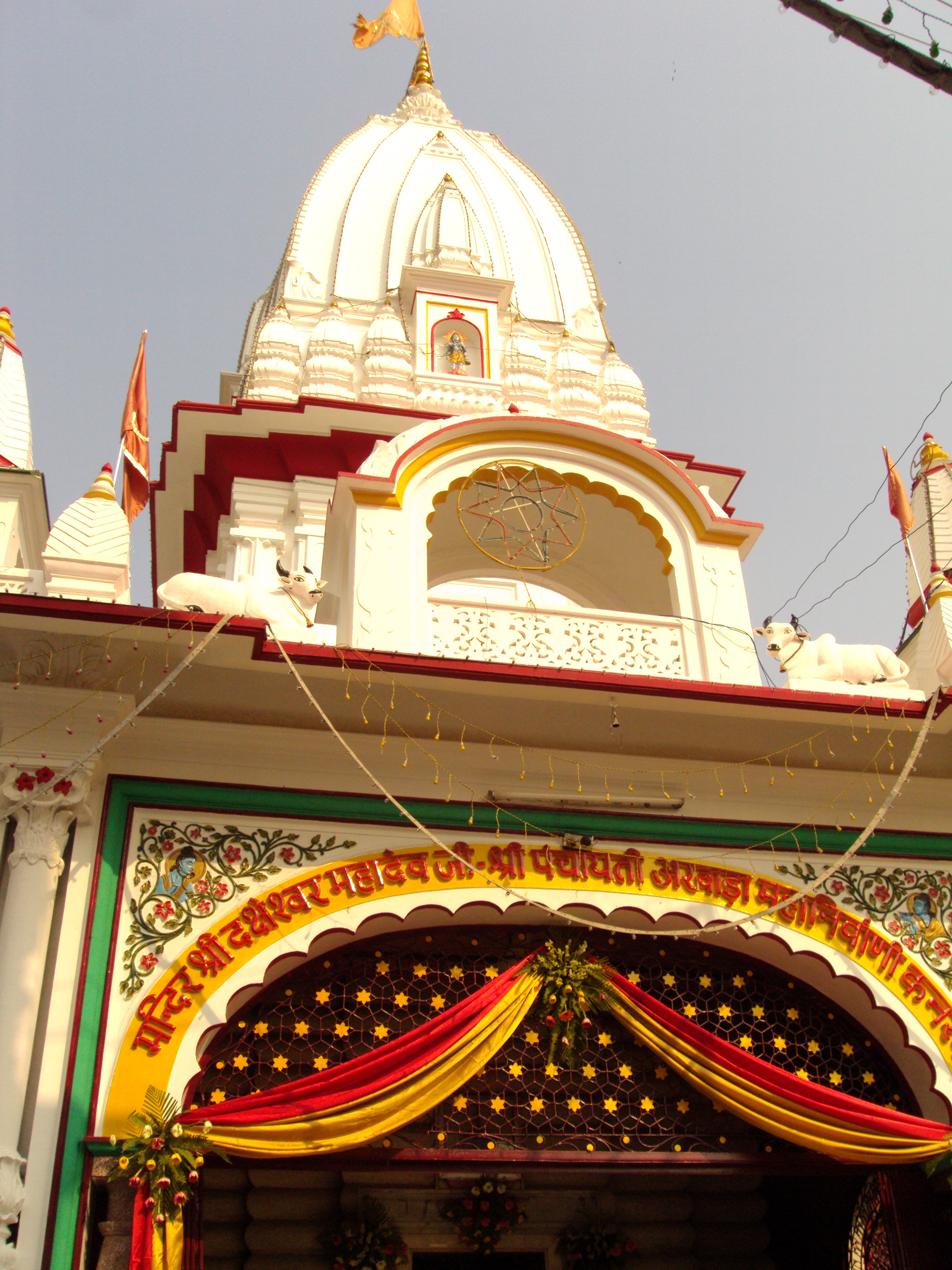

- Location within Uttarakhand

Religion
- Affiliation: Hinduism
- District: Haridwar
- Deity: Daksheswar Mahadev (Shiva)
- Festivals: Maha Shivaratri, Navratri

Location
- Location: Kankhal
- State: Uttarakhand
- Country: India
- Coordinates: 29°55′18.72″N 78°08′45.04″E

Architecture
- Type: Nagara style
- Creator: Queen Dhankaur
- Completed: 1810 CE

Daksheswar Mahadev (Hindi: दक्षेश्‍वर महादेव मन्दिर) or Daksha Mahadev temple is a Hindu temple dedicated to Lord Shiva, located in the town of Kankhal, about 4 km from Haridwar, Uttarakhand, India. It is named after King Daksha Prajapati, the father of Sati. Daksha is one of the fourteen Prajapatis, creator deities, who preside over procreation and are the protector of life in Hindu mythology.

The present temple was built by Queen Dhankaur in 1810 and rebuilt in 1962. It is a place of pilgrimage for Shaivaite devotees on Maha Shivaratri.

== History ==
=== Establishment ===
Daksheswar Mahadev Temple owes its existence to the benefaction of a prominent Gurjar queen from the Landaura Estate, located in the Landaura area of Uttarakhand. The Gurjar dynasty of Landaura is credited with not only establishing but also preserving and safeguarding this revered religious temple.

=== Legend of Daksha ===
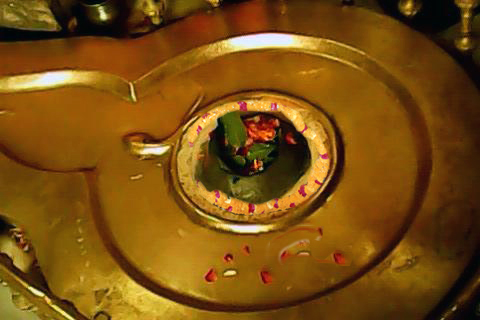
Shivlingam – this is the neck portion of Daksha, who was decapitated by Maha Rudra

As mentioned in the Mahabharata and other texts of Hinduism, King Daksha Prajapati, the father of Sati, Shiva's first wife, performed yajna at the place where the temple is situated. Although Sati felt insulted when her father did not invite Shiva to the ritual, she attended the yajna. She found that Shiva was being spurned by her father and she burnt herself in the Yajna Kunda itself. Shiva got angry and sent his Gaṇas, the terrible Virabhadra and Bhadrakali to the ritual. On the direction of Shiva, Virabhadra appeared with Shiva's ganas in the midst of Daksha's assembly like a storm wind and waged a fierce war with the gods and mortals present culminating in the beheading of Daksha, who was later given the head of a goat at the behest of Brahma and other gods. Much of the details of the Ashvamedha Yagna (Horse Sacrifice) of Daksha are found in the Vayu Purana.

=== Other structures ===
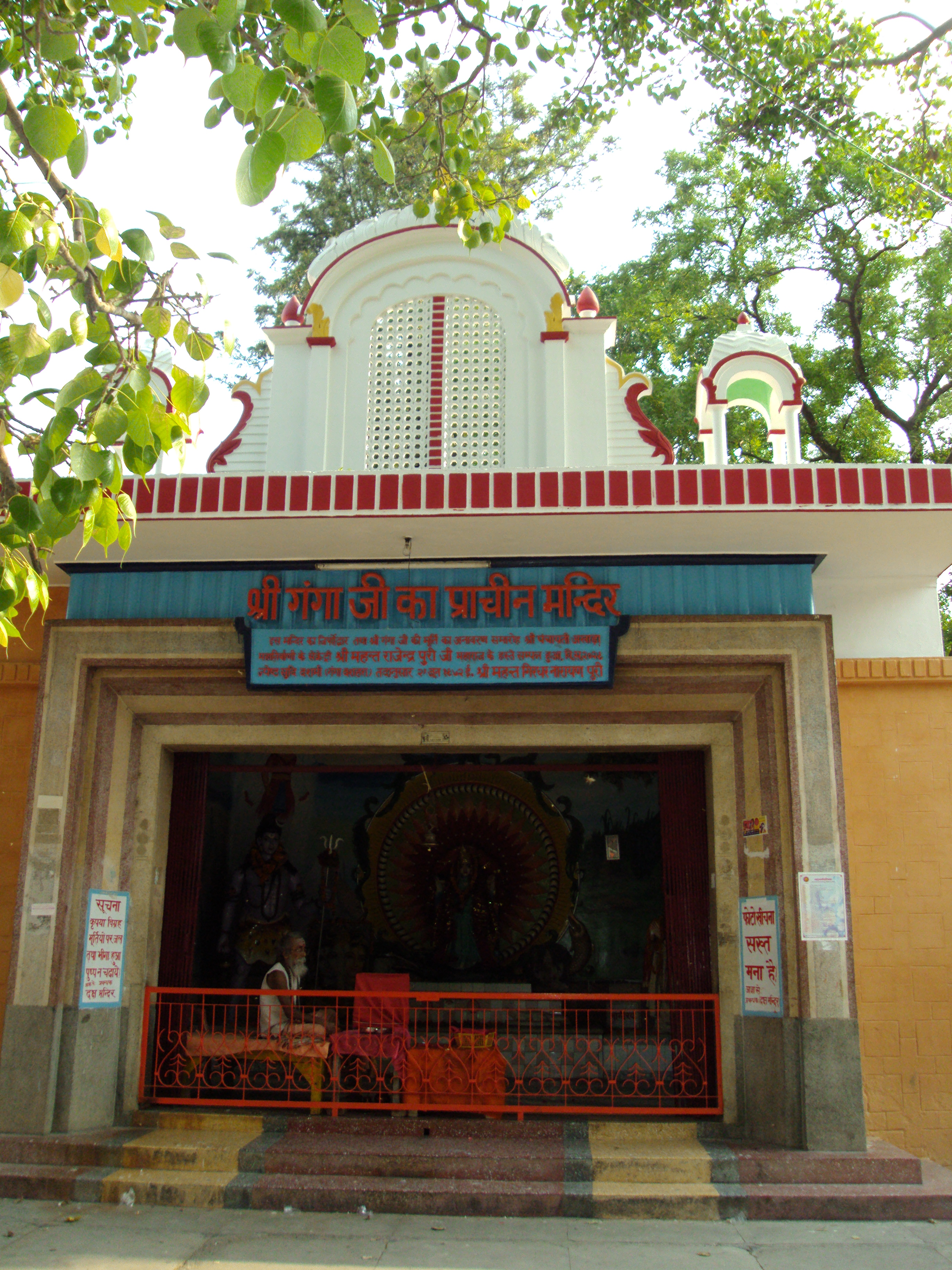
Ganga's temple within Daksheshwar Mahadev temple complex

Standing next to the main temple is the Das Mahavidya temple, dedicated to the Mahavidyas. It is a venue for devotees of Devi to congregate for special pujas during the Navratri celebrations. There is also a temple in the complex dedicated to Ganga. Next to the temple is the Daksha Ghat on the Ganges and close by is the Nileshwar Mahadev Temple.

== See also ==
- Virbhadra Temple
- Nilkanth Mahadev
- Maya Devi Temple, Haridwar
