= 1796 Haridwar Kumbh clash =

The 1796 Haridwar Kumbh clash was a conflict between Sikhs (Udasis, Khalsa, and Nirmalas) and Shaivites over logistics and camping rights. The clash occurred at the 1796 Kumbh Mela held at Haridwar and resulted in around 500 fatalities. Around 2.5 million people had attended the 1796 Haridwar Kumbh Mela. The Shaivite Gosains had been controlling the pilgrimage tax, policing, and judiciary systems of the Haridwar Kumbh. The Naga Sadhus had been bestowed with magisterial rights to collect tax on Hindu pilgrims to the kumbh by the Marathas and British. The dispute arose when the Shaivites attacked the Udasis for erecting a camp without their permission, with the Khalsa Sikhs, who accompanied the Udasis, attacking the Shaivites in revenge-attacks, leading to losses on both sides. The conflict resulted in a Sikh victory and ended the Gosain dominance over the Haridwar Kumbh Mela. The conflict was recorded by Captain Thomas Hardwicke.

== History ==
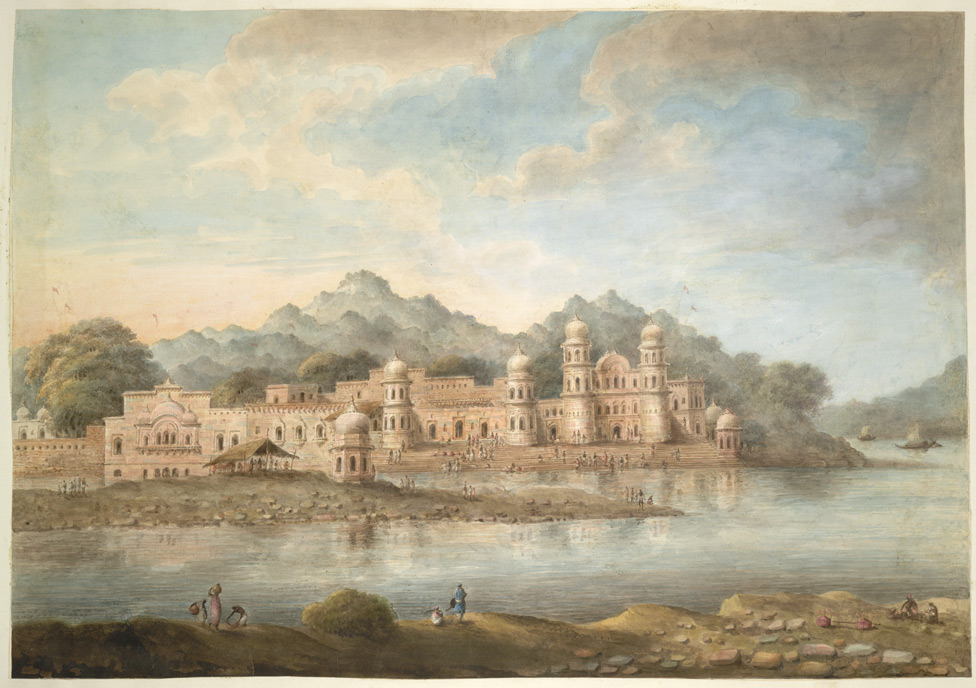
Haridwar where the clash occurred, 1814–1815.

An earlier clash at the 1760 Kumbh between the Vaishnavites and Shaivites led to many deaths according to Captain Francis Raper. The first eyewitness British account of the Haridwar Kumbh Mela was the 1796 one and occurred in an article by Captain Thomas Hardwicke in Asiatick Researches. At this time, Haridwar was part of the Maratha territory. Based on a register of taxes collected from the pilgrims, Hardwicke estimated the scale of the mela at 2-2.5 million people. According to Hardwicke, the Shaivite Gosains were the most dominant, "in point of numbers and power". The next most powerful sect were the Vaishnavite Bairagis. The Gosains carried swords, shields and managed the entire Mela. Their mahants held daily councils to hear and decide on all the complaints. The Gosains levied and collected the taxes, and did not remit any money to the Maratha treasury.

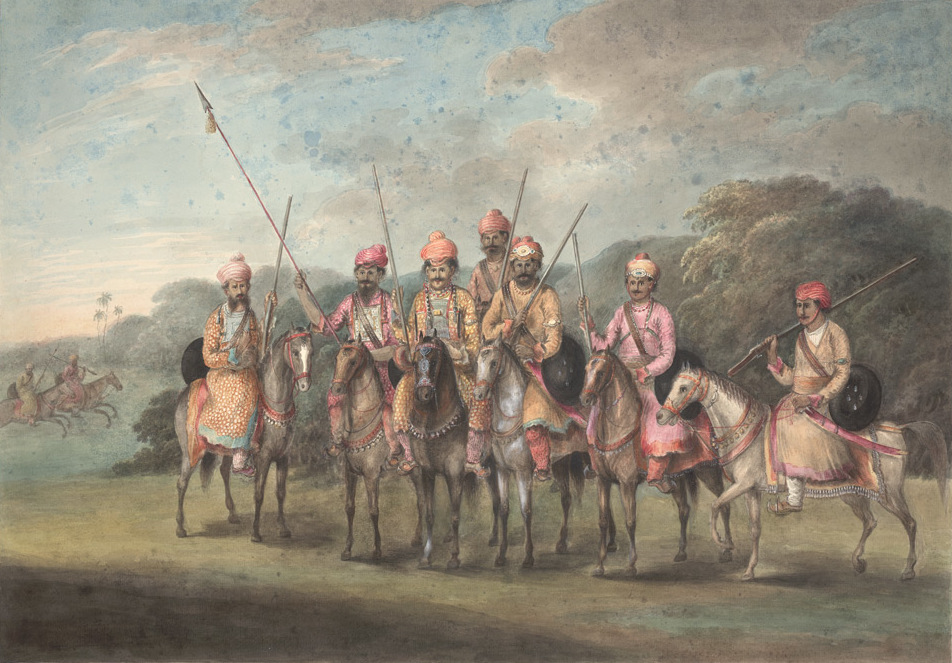
Watercolour of young Sikh horsemen, by Sita Ram, 1814–1815.

At the 1796 Haridwar Kumbh, the Sikh contingent at the mela included a large number of Udasi ascetics, who were accompanied by around 12,000-14,000 Khalsa cavalrymen. The cavalry was led by Sahib Singh of Patiala, Rai Singh Bhangi, and Sher Singh Bhangi. The Sikh soldiers encamped at Jwalapur, while the Udasis chose a place close to the festival site for their camp. The Udasi chief erected their flag on the selected site, without taking permission from the Gosain mahant. The Nirmalas and Udasis made encampments, pitched their flags, and started an akhand path of the Guru Granth Sahib three days before the kumbh officially started. They also refused to pay the customary pilgrimage tax of eight annas to one rupees per pilgrim to the nagas, as they claimed only Hindu pilgrims were required to pay it but they were Sikhs and thus were not mandated to pay.

This drew the criticism of the Gosains, who attacked the Udasis and Nirmalas, stopped their recitation of the Guru Granth Sahib and either burnt their flag. They also plundered the Udasi camp. Word of this incident reached the Khalsa Sikhs when the Udasi chief complained to Sahib Singh of Patiala, with the Khalsa Sikhs cremating the remains of the slaughtered Udasis, installed a new flag, and finished the akhand path of the Guru Granth Sahib. The three Sikh chiefs held a meeting, and sent a vakeel (agent) to the Gosain mahants, demanding retribution for the plundered material, plus free access to the river. The chief Mahant agreed to the Sikh demands, and there was no confrontation between the two groups over the next few days.

The Khalsa Sikhs sought to launch a revenge attack on the Gosains. The Sikh sardars involved in the revenge-attack were Rai Singh of Buria, Maharaja Sahib Singh of Patiala, Karam Singh of Shahbad, Dasaundha Singh of Sadhora, Baghel Singh of Maloud, Jodh Singh of Kalsia, and Rup Singh of Ropar. They launched their revenge-attack at 8 am on 10 April 1796 on the last day of the Kumbh, attacking both Gosains and other non-Udasi pilgrims, after the masses of pilgrims left and the naga sadhus were occupied with counting their earnings. Prior to this, they had moved the women and children in their camp to a village near Haridwar. The Sikhs killed around 500 Gosains, including Maunpuri, one of the mahants. Many drowned while crossing the river in an attempt to escape the massacre. The British Captain Murray, whose battalion was stationed at one of the ghats, sent two companies of sepoys to check the advance of Sikh cavalry. The Sikhs left by 3 pm; they had lost around 20 men in the clash. The next morning, the pilgrims offered prayers for the English, who they believed, had been instrumental in dispersing the Sikhs. The Sikhs were victorious in the conflict.

== Legacy ==
The clash brought an end to the dominance of the Hardiwar Kumbh by the Gosains. The clash resulted in the Udasis and Nirmalas being accepted at subsequent Kumbhs and not having to pay a tax. However, a clash and philosophical debates between the Nirmalas and Sannyasis-Bairagis followed at the 1807 Kumbh at Haridwar. The ensuing debate resulted in the Sannyasis and Bairagis agreeing that the Nirmalas could enter any temple despite their caste or creed. During the 1819 Haridwar Kumbh Mela, some Bairagis protested and attacked the Udasis because they had a procession using the Guru Granth Sahib, so the Udasi leader Pritam Das complained to Sikh chiefs, who reprimanded the Bairagis.
