= Ranipur, Uttarakhand =

Ranipur
- Town
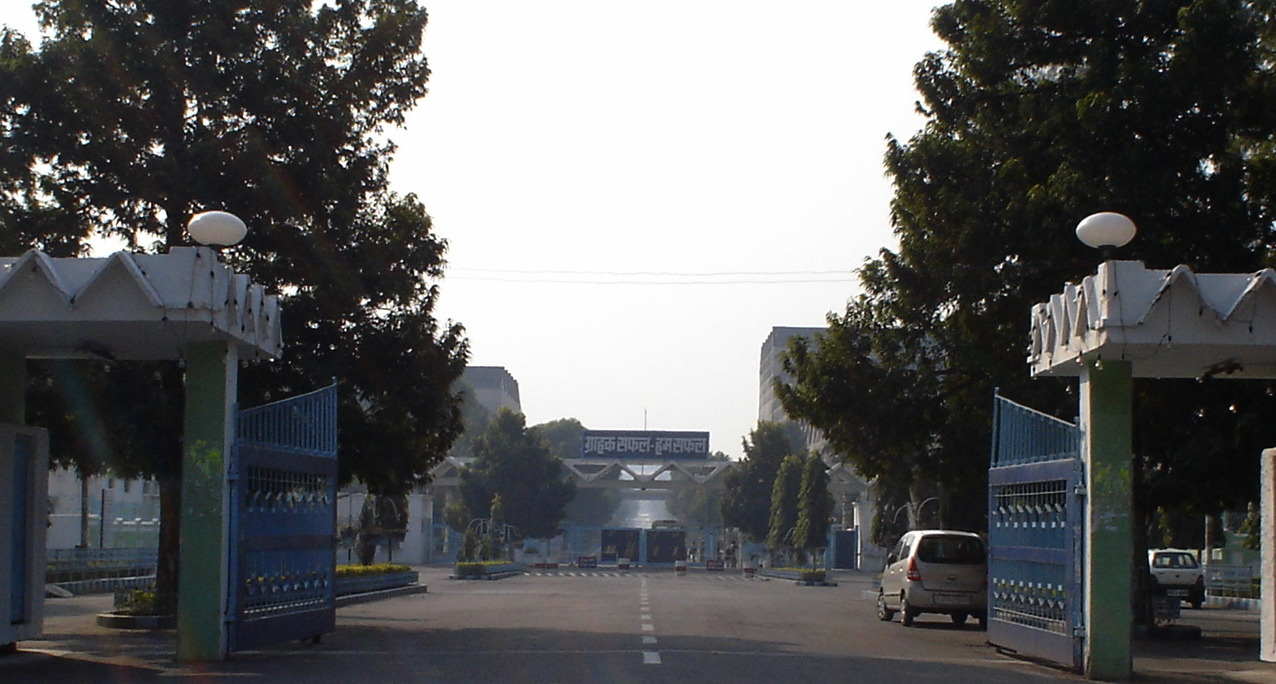
- Entrance to Bharat Heavy Electricals Limited, Ranipur

- Location in Uttarakhand, India Ranipur (India)
- Coordinates: 29.96°N 78.16°E
- Country: India
- State: Uttarakhand
- District: Haridwar

Population (2001)
  - Total: 43,252

Languages
  - Official: Hindi
  - Native: Khariboli
- Time zone: UTC+5:30 (IST)
- PIN: 249403
- Vehicle registration: UK
- Website: uk.gov.in

Ranipur or BHEL, Ranipur is a town in Haridwar district in the state of Uttarakhand, India. It is the township developed by Public sector Bharat Heavy Electricals Limited (BHEL).

== Overview ==
The town was built in the early 60s, around the Ranipur plant of Bharat Heavy Electricals Limited (BHEL) part of Nehruvian dream of "temples of modern India". It was developed with Russian and Czech technological collaboration, at peak of Indo-Soviet partnership. In an important move in 1962, Indian signed an agreement with the Soviet Union for the supply of Rs. 23 crores worth of equipment by Heavy Electrical Equipment Plants. In the subsequent years, looking at the need for more advanced technology, it tied up with Siemens AG of Germany for the production of high capacity steam turbines and generators. In 1999, the Ranipur plant, reached a turnover of Rs 1100 crore, which reached Rs 2,658 crore for the year 2007–08. The HEEP plant along had over 7,500 employees.

Today BHEL, is one of India's seven largest Public Sector Undertakings or PSUs, known as the Maharatnas or 'the seven jewels'. The old village of Ranipur still exists at the edge of the township, just at the entrance of Rajaji National Park. As the town developed, schools eventually over 17 and basic infrastructure, including roads, hospitals and community recreational centres was put into place. Soon ancillaries came around the township in surrounding area, led to economic development of the Jwalapur, and the main Haridwar town itself, which till then survived mostly on tourism.

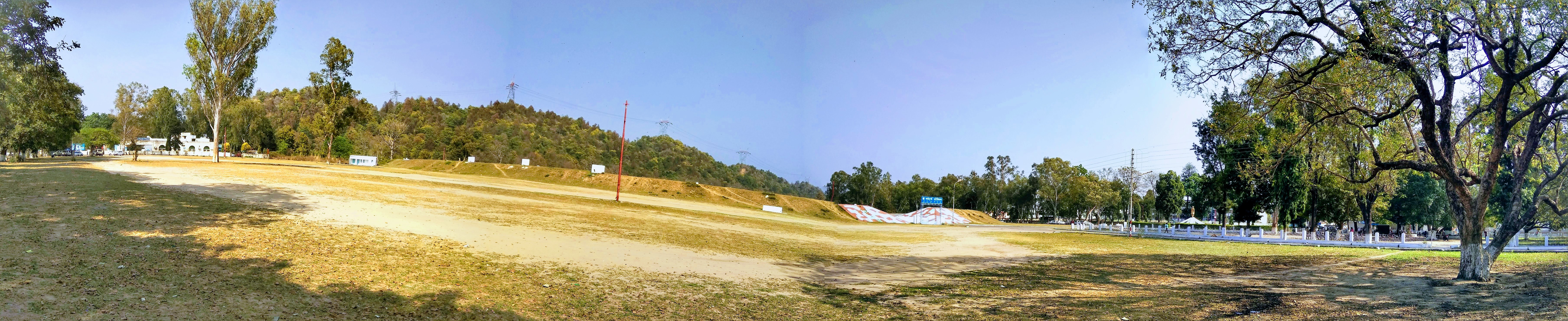
BHEL Sport Stadium Near HEEP Main Gate Ranipur Haridwar

BHEL Haridwar has a campus of 7,000 acres (28 km^{2}), now 2,034 acres (8.23 km^{2}) of which is inhabited by 200 companies like many more in the nearby SIDCUL (State Industrial Development Corporation of Uttarakhand) industrial area. The Integrated Industrial Estate of SIDCUL was an attractive proposition promoted by the Uttarakhand government whereby various financial incentives such as Central Excise duty( 100% for 10 years), Income Tax(100% for 5 years) et al. is being granted. BHEL Haridwar plant itself consists of two plants namely HEEP (Heavy Electricals Equipment Plant) & CFFP (Central Foundry & Forge Plant). CFFP has one of the heaviest forge machines in India.

With Haridwar becoming a district headquarters in 1998, saw new offices were set up near the township in areas surrounding Roshanabad, especially after the formation of Uttarakhand state in 2000

== Demographics ==
As of 2001 India census, Bharat Heavy Electricals Limited Ranipur had a population of 43,252. Males constitute 53% of the population and females 47%. Bharat Heavy Electrical Limited Ranipur has an average literacy rate of 81%, higher than the national average of 59.5%; with male literacy of 86% and female literacy of 75%. 9% of the population is under 6 years of age.

== Transport ==
BHEL Ranipur, is well connected by road to National Highway 58, between Delhi and Manapass. Nearest railway stations are at Jwalapur and Haridwar. The nearest airport is Jolly Grant Airport, Dehradun, though Indira Gandhi International Airport in New Delhi is preferred.

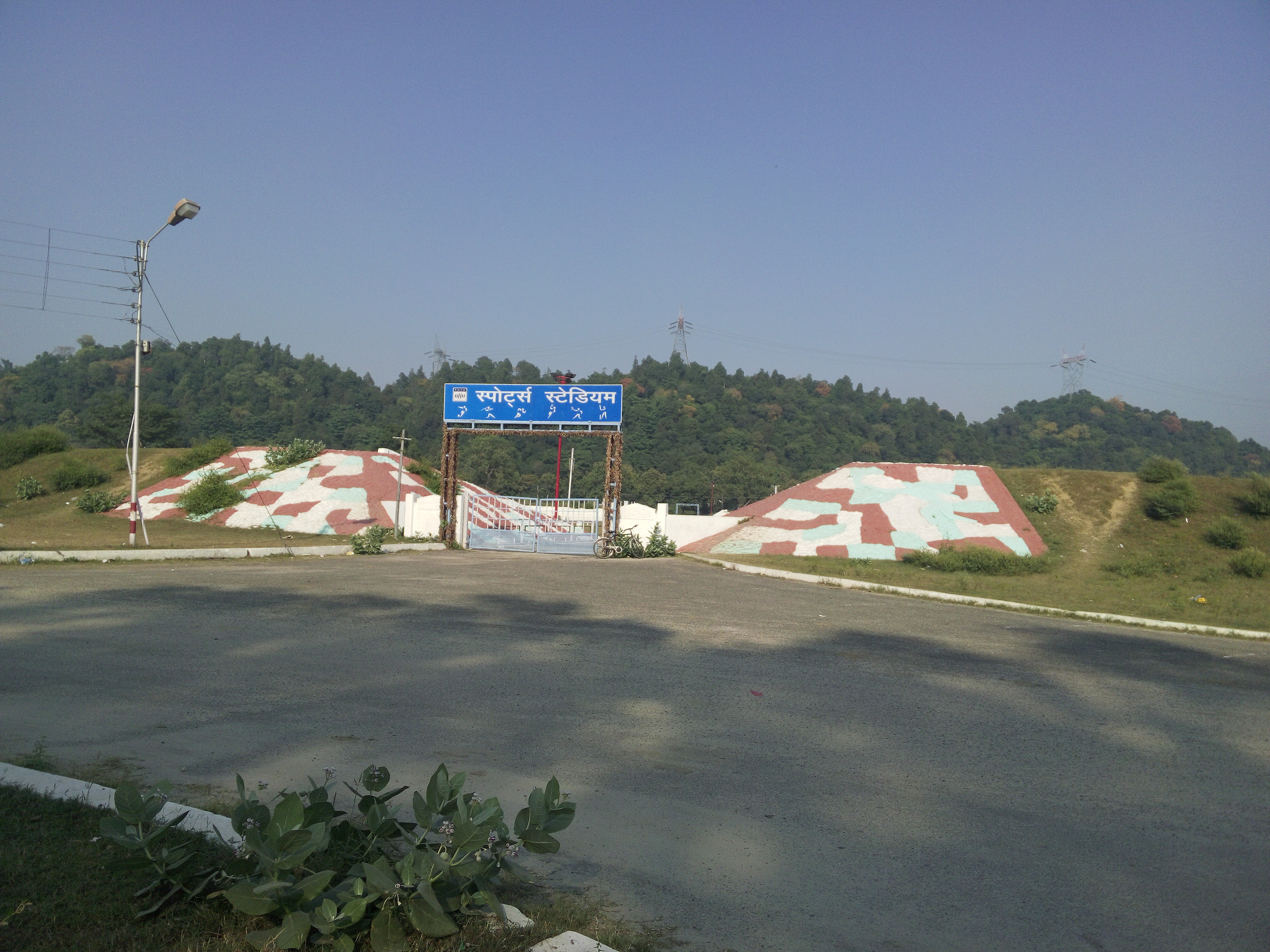
Shivalik Hills near BHEL Haridwar

== Education ==
- Chinmaya Degree College
- Delhi Public School, Ranipur
- Kendriya Vidyalaya, B.H.E.L.
- Vidya Mandir Sr. Secondary school Sector-5, B.H.E.L.
