= Nirmala (sect) =

Sikh sect

Nirmala ਨਿਰਮਲੇ
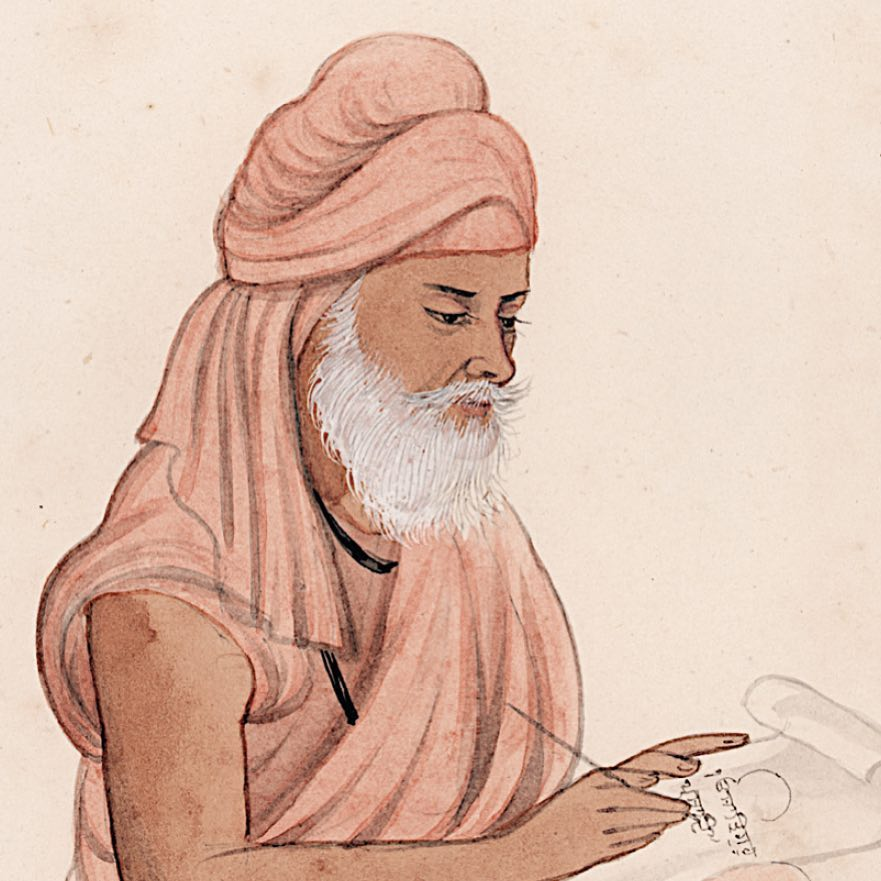
- Painting of a Nirmala Sikh by Kapur Singh, Amritsar, ca.1860–65

Founder
- Bir Singh, Ganda Singh, Karam Singh, Ram Singh, and Saina Singh

Regions with significant populations
- Punjab • Gangetic Plains

Religions
- Sikhism • Hinduism (specifically Vedanta) syncretism

Scriptures
- Guru Granth Sahib • Vedantic texts

Languages
- Punjabi • Sanskrit

Nirmala (Punjabi: ਨਿਰਮਲੇ, lit. "those without blemish" or "spotless") also known as Nirmala Saṁpardā or Nirmal Paṅth, is a Sikh sect (sampradāya) of ascetics that are involved in preaching and religious education. According to the traditional beliefs, the Sanatan Nirmala Sikh tradition was founded by Guru Gobind Singh in late 17th century when he sent five (or thirteen as per another version) Sikhs to Varanasi to learn Sanskrit and Vedanta texts. The Nirmalas became influential after Sikh rulers in Malwa began sponsoring them in the mid-19th century. The main organization of the sect is the Panchayati Akhara Nirmal, founded in 1862 at Patiala and now based in Kankhal, Haridwar, Uttarakhand. They are Sanatan Sikhs and were influenced by Advaita Vedanta. They are an intellectual tradition which produced translations and commentaries of Sanskritic and Sikh literature into vernacular languages. They were also responsible for performing katha discourses and the management of Sikh shrines. During the 19th century, they alongside the Udasis were responsible for the spreading of Sanatan Sikhism. They also played a key-role in the indigenous, pre-colonial education system. They are a Sanskritised tradition.

== Etymology ==
The Sanskrit word nirmala means "spotless, unsullied, pure, bright".

== History ==
=== Background ===
The religion started by Guru Nanak and subsequent Sikh gurus did not have an official name for a while and many terms were used to describe the religion, such as Nanakpanth, Gurmukh Panth, and Guru Sikh Panth. One amongst these various terms was Nirmal Panth, meaning "pure panth" to distinguish the followers of the faith, as the term Sikh was also used by Buddhists, followers of Gorakh, and followers of the Hindu schools at the time. Thus, the term Nirmal Panth was a more distinguishing name for Sikhism in the historical period. Sikhs writers, such as Bhai Gurdas and the Bhatts also make use of the term to describe the religion of the Sikh gurus. During the period of Guru Gobind Singh, the term began to take on a more narrow definition for a particular tradition or sect within the wider Sikh community.

=== Origin ===
==== Traditional narratives ====
The origins of the Nirmala sect is contested, with tradition claiming they originated either with Guru Nanak or Guru Gobind Singh but historically they find first mention in the early 18th century, with more frequent references as the century progresses. The general Nirmala sect claims to have been founded by Guru Nanak in 1564, who they claim bestowed upon Bhai Bhagirath the Mul Mantar and Nirmal Vakh. When Guru Gobind Singh was at Paonta, his court-poets were translating and explaining historical Indic literature in Sanskrit to Braj or Punjabi during the years 1685–1688 so that the works could become accessible to the laymen and masses. Guru Gobind Singh devised a plan to have a group of Sikhs trained in traditional Indic literature, mythology, and philosophy, so that they can re-interpret such materials under a Sikh lens. However, traditionally higher-level access to such materials was limited a select priestly or ascetical classes, such as the Brahmins, Sannyasis, and Vairagis, and those proficient in Sanskrit. Thus, the Guru requested one of his court-poets, namely Pandit Raghu Nath to teach the Sikhs the Sanskrit language but he refused to-do so as the pandit believed it was forbidden of him to teach the deva bhasha ("language of the gods") and Indic scriptures to non-dvijas. After this refusal, Guru Gobind Singh invited the Udasi sect to carry-out the task but they did not respond to the request. Therefore, the guru decided to choose thirteen Sikhs from various backgrounds and castes to study at Kashi (Varanasi) and master the material required for the mission. The names of the thirteen Sikhs selected were: Pandit Karma Singh, Pandit Rama Singh, Pandit Ganda Singh, Pandit Vir Singh, Pandit Sobha Singh, Dharam Singh, Daya Singh, Kesar Singh, Muhkam Singh, Gian Singh, Gaja Singh, Chanda Singh, and Saina Singh. They studied under Pandit Sadda Nand at Kashi for six years and returned to Guru Gobind Singh in the seventh year, who was now based out of Anandpur, who gave them different responsibilities after their return from Kashi. For example, Pandit Karma Singh was tasked with teaching Bhai Mani Singh the six darsanas (schools of orthodox Hindu philosophy) and performing religious instruction on gurbani in the morning.

However, another version of the origin story of the Nirmalas only involve five Sikhs being sent to Kashi by the guru, with this group of five being known as the Panch Nirmal Gaurik. According to the Nirmalas, in 1686, Guru Gobind Singh sent five Sikhs (Bir Singh, Ganda Singh, Karam Singh, Ram Singh and Saina Singh) to Varanasi (dressed as upper-class members) to learn Sanskrit and classical Hindu literature. This began the Nirmala tradition, with their successors becoming known as the Nirmalas. After they returned to Anandpur, they were honoured by the title Nirmala (Sanskrit for "pure" or "unsullied"). These five then shared what they learnt at Kashi with others, leading to the formation of the Nirmalas. The Nirmalas took the Amrit initiation into the Khalsa Panth.

According to another account found in the late 19th-century Nirmal Panth Pardipika by the Nirmala scholar and Tat Khalsa supporter Giani Gian Singh, Guru Gobind Singh met a Sanskrit scholar named Pandit Raghunath in late 17th-century. He asked him to teach Sanskrit to Sikhs. However, Raghunath politely refused to do so, because he did not want to teach Sanskrit to Shudras. So Guru Gobind Singh sent some Sikhs dressed in upper-caste attire to Varanasi, where they became accomplished scholars of Indian theology and philosophy. The Pandit Raghunath-related story of Giani Gian Singh is likely ahistorical fiction.

==== Scholarly views on their origin ====
The origin of the Nirmalas is uncertain. The historicity of the traditional accounts have been questioned because there are very few mentions of Nirmalas before the 19th century. Pashaura Singh and Louis E. Fenech hypothesise that the Nirmalas originated much later or may have descended from the Udasis, who are similar to them in ascetic lifestyle, celibacy and Vedantic interpretation of Sikh philosophy. According to Khushwant Singh and other historians, the sect is first mentioned in the Sikh literature during the Guru Gobind Singh era, in the last decade of the 17th century. According to Nirmal Panth Pardipka, the Nirmala tradition has roots in the early history of Sikhism. In the 19th century, some Nirmala scholars traced their origin to the period of the first Sikh Guru, Nanak, but some others such as Khushwant Singh state that the Nirmala tradition was founded by the last Sikh Guru, Gobind Singh. The belief that the sect originated in the 17th century, according to W. H. McLeod, is of doubtful historicity because they are "scarcely mentioned" in Sikh literature before the 19th century.

=== Spread of influence and patronage ===
After the evacuation of Anandpur in 1705, the Nirmalas dispersed into various regions outside Punjab, founding their centres at Kankhal near Haridwar, Pakki Sangat at Allahabad, and the Chetan Math and Chhoti Sangat at Kashi (Varanasi). They only began to return to Punjab when the region fell into Sikh control later in the century, where they received the patronage of ruling Sikh chiefs and monarchs, founding further centres of their sect in the Punjab based upon this support from a new ruling-class of Sikhs.

The Nirmalas grew in numbers and became divided into two groups:

- those who wore pink (bhagva) clothes and did not marry (even though marriage was not explicitly prohibited and the livelihood of a familial house-holder was advocated)
- those who wore white clothes, being further divided into the unmarried (known as sants) and the married (known as gianis)

The Nirmalas were awarded by the Khalsa due to their work to disseminate Sikhism, bestowing land-grants upon prominent Nirmala figures. Upon receiving the land-grant, many of the Nirmalas would then dedicate it to a particular akhara, with a few being given to the akhara associated with the Udasi figure Santokh Das.

During the later part of the 18th century, the Nirmalas began to receive patronage from Sikh rulers and gentry in the form of land grants and religious endowments. Patronage from Sikh nobles, especially the rulers of the Phulkian states, helped the Nirmalas become a prominent religious order. Sardar Dhyan Singh of Shahbad willed his estate to Karam Singh Nirmala. In 1766, Sadda Singh of Bahirwala offered seven villages to Bhagat Singh Nirmala, although the latter declined the offer. Sardar Jai Singh's daughter-in-law granted two villages to the Nirmal dera at Kankhal. Sardar Ganda Singh of Bhangi Misl offered 13 villages to Jai Singh Nirmala. In 1796, Maharaja Ranjit Singh also granted a sanad for land to Nihal Singh Nirmala. On both occasions, the Nirmalas passed on the properties to the Udasi akhara of Santokh Das.

After the invasions of Ahmad Shah Abdali, the region experienced relative peace, which allowed the Nirmalas to further propagate their teachings. It is around this time that they began participating in Hindu religious fairs and gatherings, such as the Kumbh Mela. They performed shahi processions like the sadhus at these places of pilgrimage and held religious discourses and debates with rival groups to further their missionary work. The missionary activities of the Nirmalas brought them into conflict and religious debates with the rival ascetic orders of the Sannyasis and Bairagis, whom were Shaivites and Vaishnavites also vying for patronage, with the tension culminating in the 1796 Haridwar Kumbh clash. Another dispute between the Nirmalas and Sannyasis-Bairagis followed at the 1807 Haridwar Kumbh Mela. The ensuing debate resulted in the Sannyasis and Bairagis agreeing that the Nirmalas could enter any temple despite their caste or creed. The Nirmala figure Diwan Singh Thikriwala is said to have defeated the Brahmins of Trimbak in Maharashtra in a philosophical debate regarding the allowance of Nirmalas and their low-caste companions to enter the complex wearing kacchera, maintaining kesh (uncut hair), and wearing a dastar (turban). The debate also involved the permittance for Nirmalas of all castes and backgrounds to bathe in the Kushavrat Sarovar, which the Brahmins reserved the right to. Due to their victories in such debates, the Nirmalas gradually won access to attending the Kumbh Melas at Haridwar, Nashik, Ujjain, and Triveni (Prayagraj), allowing for the development of Sikh shrines at such locations, with some of these sites still being managed by the Nirmalas.

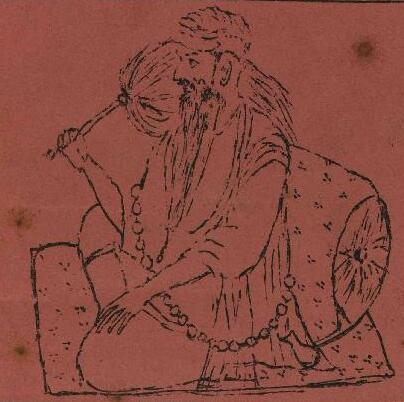
Illustration of Sant Nihal Singh, a Nirmala scholar, from the title-page of 'Granthi Bhav Sagar Setu', circa mid-to-late-19th century

The Nirmalas did not restrict their activities to the Punjabi language, script, or region. They propagated their beliefs and practices by producing literature in other languages, such as Sanskrit, Braj, Sindhi, and Hindi, and scripts such as Devanagari. They translated both older Indic literature and Sikh compositions into the vernacular language for the masses. Some of these Nirmala scholars were Sant Nikka Singh, Sant Nihal Singh, Tara Singh Narotam, and Giani Gian Singh. Their works discussing Sikh thought helped spread and familiarize its tenets to scholars of other religious traditions at places of Hindu pilgrimage with Sikhism. In-turn, the Nirmalas began being influenced by the Vedanta school of Hinduism from the mid-18th century onwards. Thus, they began to view Sikhism as an extension of Vedanta rather than as an independent school of thought. Furthermore, the established their own seminaries (vidyalas) and deras, such as at Kashi, Lahore, Kankhal, and Amritsar. The Nirmala dera at Kankhal was the main one. The Nirmalas, alongside the Udasis, are also credited with preserving and maintaining historical Sikh sites and literary works.

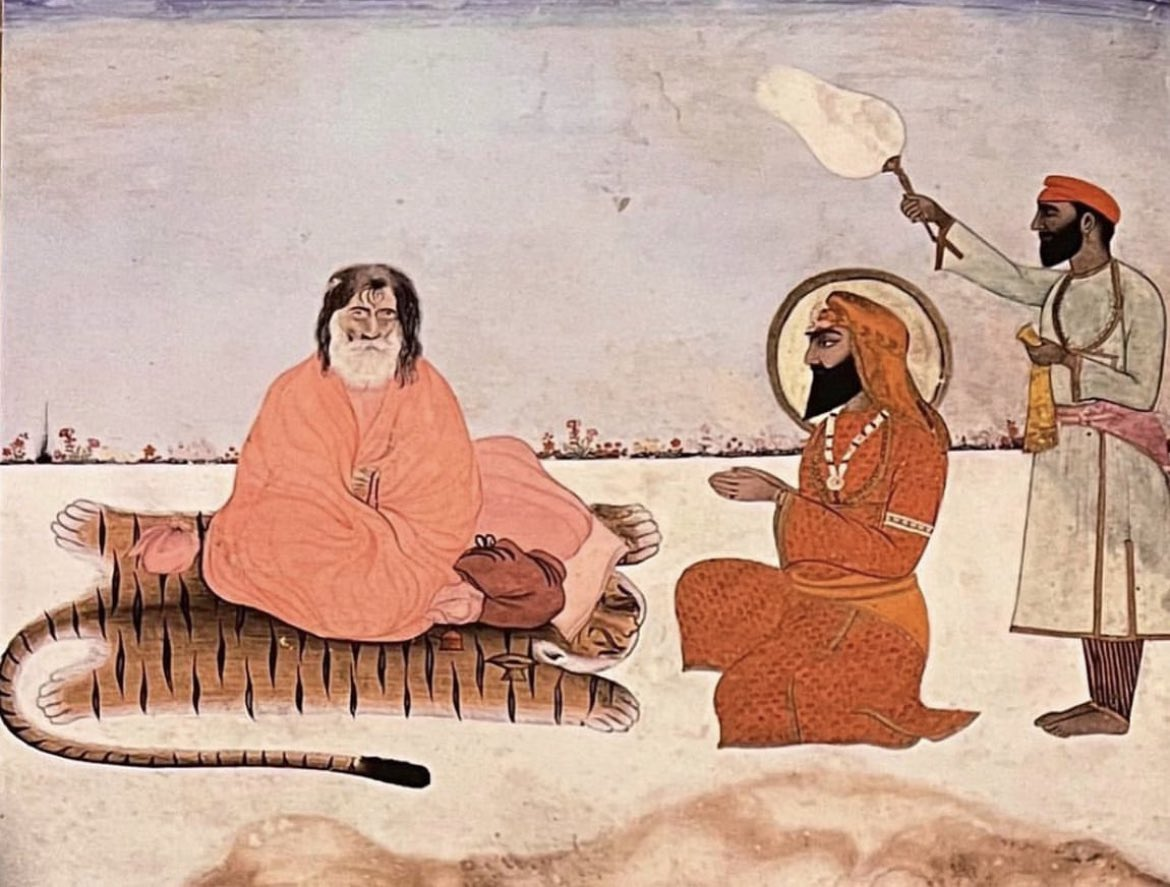
Painting of Maharaja Narinder Singh of Patiala paying homage to a Nirmala holy-man, ca.1860

At the 1855 Haridwar Kumbh Mela, the Nirmalas elected scholar Mahitab Singh (also spelt Mehtab Singh) of Rishikesh as their head representative (with the title being known as a Sri Mahant). The Phulkian states of Patiala, Jind, and Nabha of the cis-Sutlej region in Punjab helped the Nirmalas establish a centralized body by establishing in 1861 a site at Patiala, known as Dharam Dhuja (Dharamdhaja Panchayati Akhara Nirmala), a panchaiti akhara dedicated to the sect, formally consecrated on 7 August 1862. The purpose of its founding was to create a main body to oversee and consolidate all Nirmala activity, with a code of conduct being compiled. This became the main organization to regulate their sect, now known as the Panchayati Akhara Nirmal. Furthermore, four nomadic akharas for each of the four directions was established, each being headed by a mahant. Despite the Dharam Dhuja being in Patiala, the main centre for the sect remained at Kankhal.

Furthermore in 1861, the rulers of Patiala, Jind, and Nabha bestowed 100,000 rupees in cash and revenue-free land-granths totally 5,875 rupees to the Nirmalas to establish branches in Haridwar, Prayag, Ujjain, Triambak, and Kurukshetra. According to Harjot Singh Oberoi, the Nirmalas (along with the Udasis) were critical for the spreading of Sikhism in distant and peripheral regions outside of the core homeland of Sikhism in Central Punjab, which was accomplished by promoting Sanatan Sikhism, a form of the religion that accommodates Hindu beliefs and practices. Thus, the Nirmalas acted as cultural mediators of Sikhism. Its preachings were conducted by wandering and itinerant ascetics and mendicants in liminal zones that visited places of pilgrimage and festivals to preach, introducing the Hindu residents of such areas to Sikh philosophy in a familiar format but also an open one and not restrictive. An example of the Nirmalas' successful missionary work that brought a peripheral community into the Sikh sphere of influences is the mercantile communities of southwestern Punjab, popularly known as Sindhis.

The Nirmalas were also noted for their traditional scholarship. Furthermore, Nirmala establishments provided an indigenous form of both secular and religious education in pre-colonial Punjab, especially in rural areas, that provided learning to pupils across social and religious backgrounds, consisting of peasants, artisans, and aristocrats. These akhara schools in settlements provided an education covering the subjects of linguistics/languages, the classics, scriptures, rhetoric, astrology, and medicine. Notable Sikh figure Sant Attar Singh of Mastauna (1867–1927) studied at one such Nirmala school at Cheema village in Patiala State in his youth. At Amritsar, a number of bungas attached to the central Sikh shrine, the Golden Temple, were associated with the Nirmalas, that taught about Sikh mythology, theology, and meditation. Individual Nirmalas served as scholars, authors, historians, traditional doctors (ayurveda), exagetes, translators, and transcribers. A Nirmala had assisted Sir John Malcolm in his 1810 work covering the Sikhs by providing explanations of the Sikh scripture to him. In the early 1870s, the missionary Ernest Trumpp was assisted by the Nirmala scholar Atma Singh of Amritsar in his research on Sikhism. Some notable Nirmala authors and intellectuals during the colonial period were Tara Singh Narotam and Giani Gian Singh, who authored a number of works on various subjects.

=== Present ===
The Nirmalas are wary of the Shiromani Gurdwara Parbandhak Committee claiming that the Nirmala sites are "Sikh gurdwaras", thus allowing them to legally forcibly take possession of them. The SGPC has tried to assert that Nirmalas are Sikhs in-response to court cases which ruled that they could not take-over sites belonging to heterodoxical groups.

== Philosophy and practices ==
The Nirmalas hold the Vedas as revelation and that its teachings remain the same but the medium (such as language) can change. Thus, Nirmalas believe that the Guru Granth Sahib expounds upon the fundamentals taught in the Vedas. Like the Udasis, the Nirmalas interpret the teachings of the Sikh Gurus in context of Vedanta. According to Lynn Teskey Denton, they view the first Sikh Guru, Nanak, as an Advaita Vedantist, a follower of Shankara, and a defender of the Sanatana Dharma. However, the notion that Guru Nanak either followed or admired Adi Shankara is likely not found in any original Nirmala work, nor is this view promoted by any Nirmala Deras. Instead, the 19th century Nirmala scholar Tara Singh Narotam's original work states that the gurmat is an amalgamation of the doctrines of Sankara and Ramanuja, with the exception that bhakti preponderates over jnana and action, thereby explicitly rejecting Shankara’s philosophy in part.

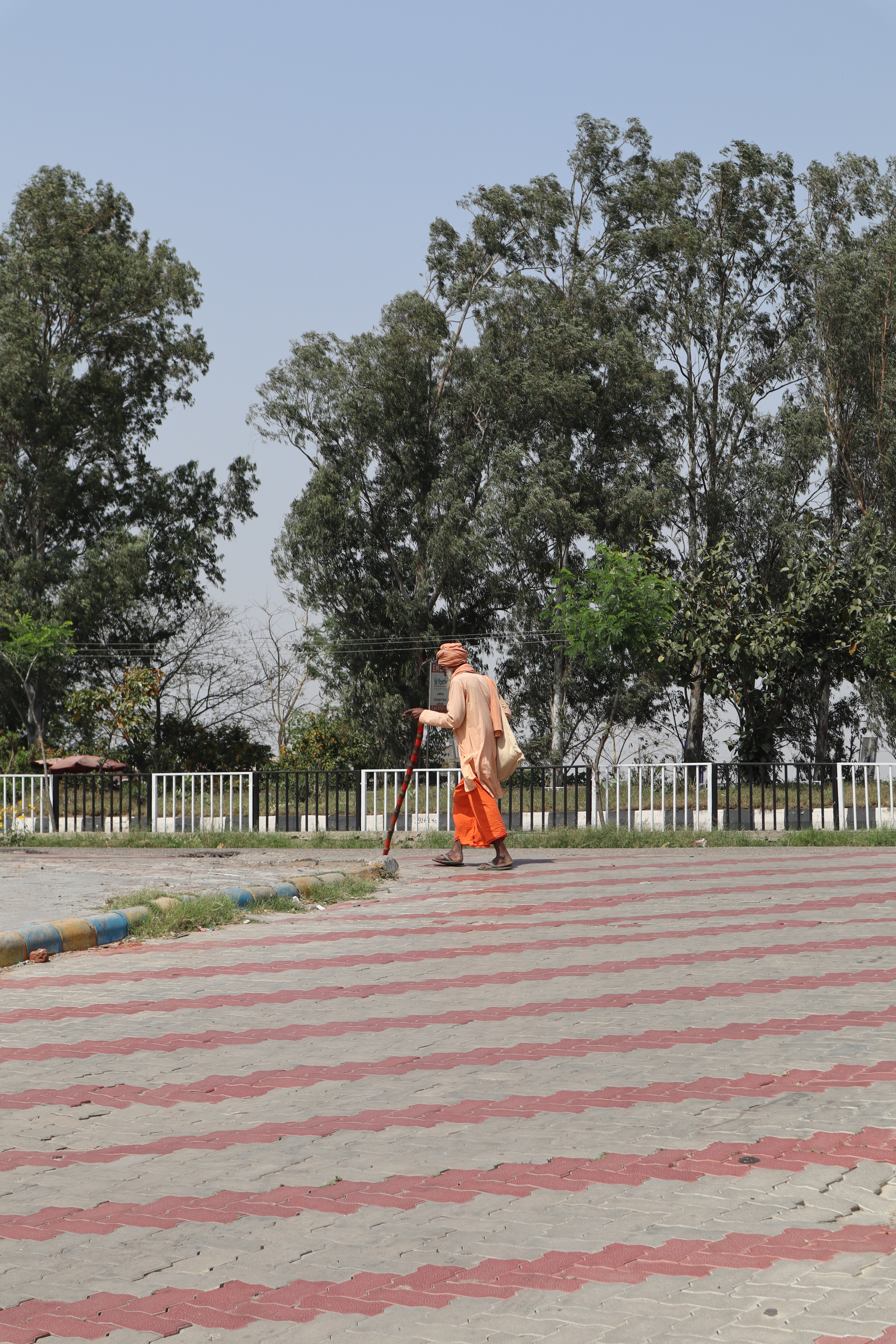
Photograph of a Nirmala Sikh man at Doraha, Punjab, India, 13 April 2023

Compared to the Udasis, the Nirmalas have shared a closer relationship the mainstream Khalsa Sikhs. Many prominent Nirmala sants preached mainstream Sikhism in Punjab, and Nirmala akharas have played an important role in training Sikhs. But after the Akali movement, the Khalsa attempts to create a Sikh identity completely distinct from Hindus made the Khalsa-Nirmala relationship fragile. The Nirmalas also believe in the ten Sikh gurus and the Guru Granth Sahib like mainstream Sikhs. However, they differ from mainstream Sikhs as they do not usually under-go the Pahul to become Khalsa. Furthermore, they are usually celibates and they place more importance on studying scriptures and philosophy. They are more influenced by the Vedantic school of philosophy.

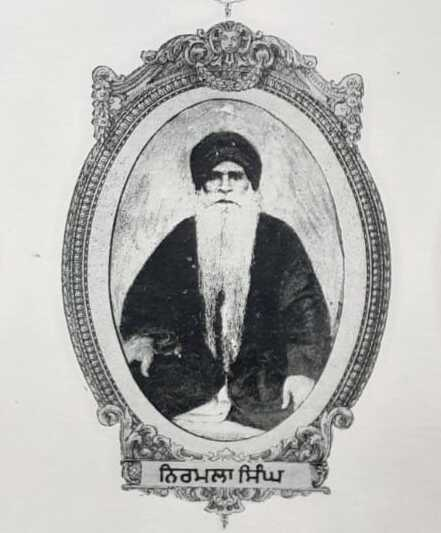
Nirmala Sikh, detail from portrait photographs of Sikh men from various kinds, appearances, and sects of Sikhism, from the 1930 first edition of Mahan Kosh

The Nirmala Sikhs wear ochre-colored/bhagwa robes (or at least one item) and keep kesh (unshorn hair). They observe the same birth and death rituals as the Hindu ascetics and have an akhara (martial organisation) in Haridwar, and a number of deras in Punjab (India). They have been one of the procession participants in Kumbh Melas. They were early missionaries who traveled and spread Sikhism among the masses, thus making an important contribution to the growth of Sikhism. They often served as one of the mahants in Sikh temples (gurdwaras) during the 18th century. Nirmalas interpret the Sikh literature in Vedantic terms. During the Singh Sabha Movement of late 19th century and early 20th century, they were condemned by the Tat Khalsa faction of Sikhs, and cordially supported by the Sanatan Sikhs.

== Literature and scholars ==
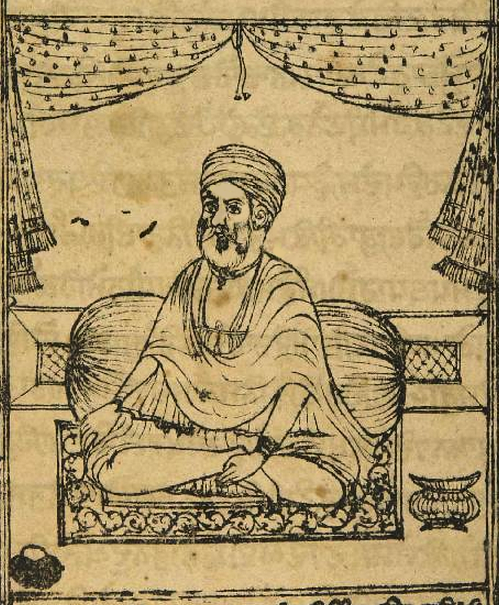
Pundit Tara Singh, a Nirmala Sikh author on Sikh theology.

Originally an oral-based tradition, they began becoming more literary-focused in the early 19th century, with a focus on exegetical literature. Their works are distinguished from that of the Udasis by how they often breakdown a single phrases into separate words and give many meanings of each single word, while the Udasis tended to only give one meaning to a word or phrase. The Nirmalas wrote in Sanskrit, Braj, Hindi, and Punjabi. The Nirmala works can be divided into two types:

- Translations of Hindu texts and scriptures from Sanskrit to Sadh Bhasha (written in Gurmukhi)
- Works discussing gurmat (Sikh theology)

Some notable Nirmala scholars and authors include Pandit Sadda Singh of Chetan Math, Pandit Gulab Singh, Pandit Tara Singh Narotam, Pandit Sadhu Singh, and Giani Gian Singh. Kavi Santokh Singh is identified as a Nirmala by some scholars such as Shackle but Jvala Singh argues he was a Giani.

== Divisions and locations ==
The Nirmalas have internal divisions, which they call sampradayas, with each division having their own associated deras (centres). The Sri Nirmal Panchayati Akhada or Sri Panchayati Akhada Nirmal at Kankhal, established with grants from the rulers of Phulkian states, has the highest status among all Nirmala chapters. Other major Nirmala centres are located at Haridwar, Allahabad, Ujjain, Trimbak, Kurukshetra and Patna. Their centres are also known as an akhara, which are headed by a mahant. The akharas house celibate members who were initiated into the order by the local leader, known as a guru by their disciples. Sikh scriptures (such as the Guru Granth Sahib) and Hindu scriptures (such as the Vedas, Mahabharata, Ramayana, Puranas, and Shastras) were studied at such locations, via memorizing and transcribing them as handwritten manuscripts.

== Notable Nirmalas ==
- Pundit Tara Singh (1822–1891), Punjabi and Sanskrit scholar
- Giani Gian Singh, (1822–1921), Scholar
- Sant Balbir Singh Seechewal, Environmentalist and Member of Rajya Sabha, India.
- Sakshi Maharaj, Member of Parliament, India.

== Gallery ==
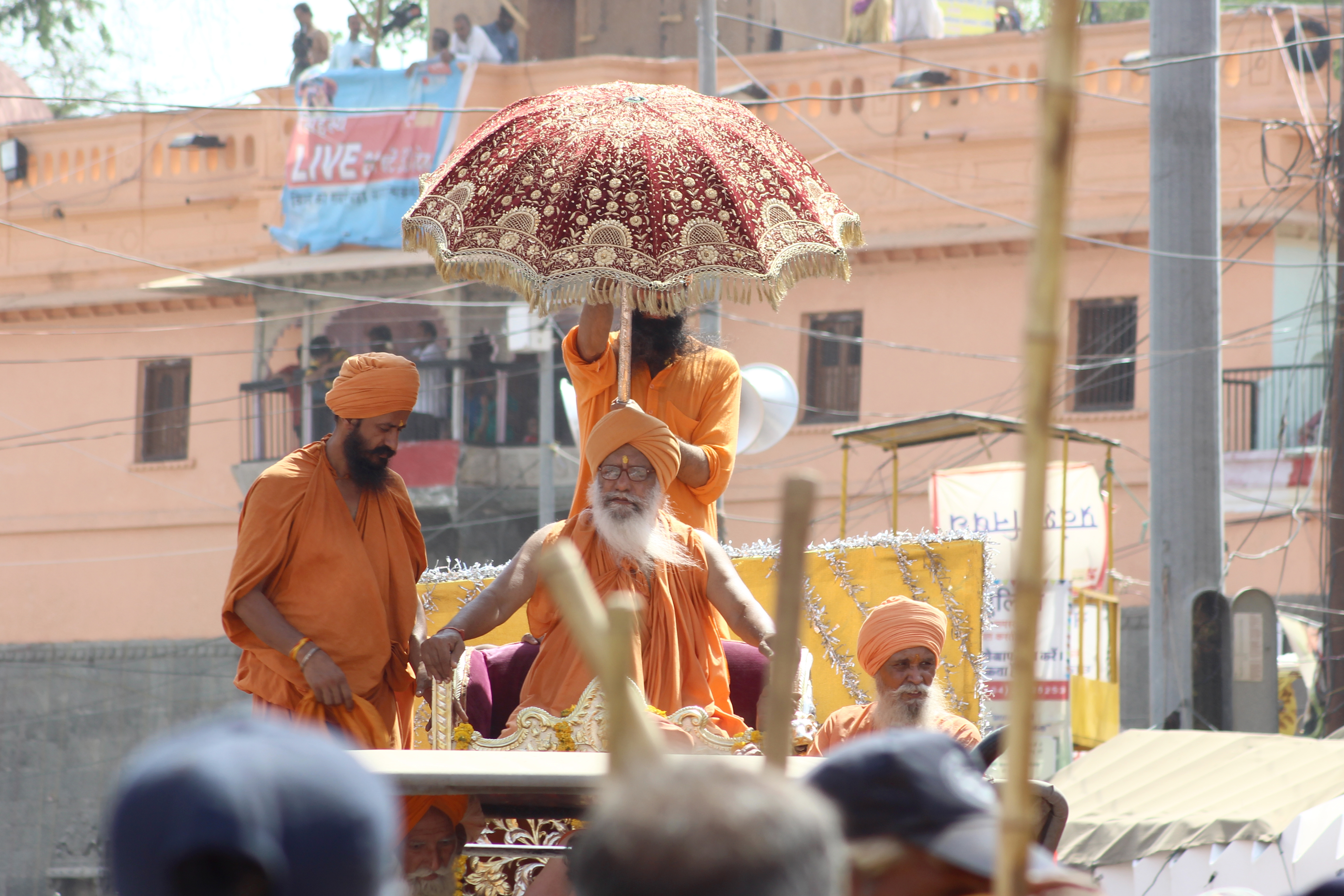
Sri Mahant Gyandev Singh Maharaj

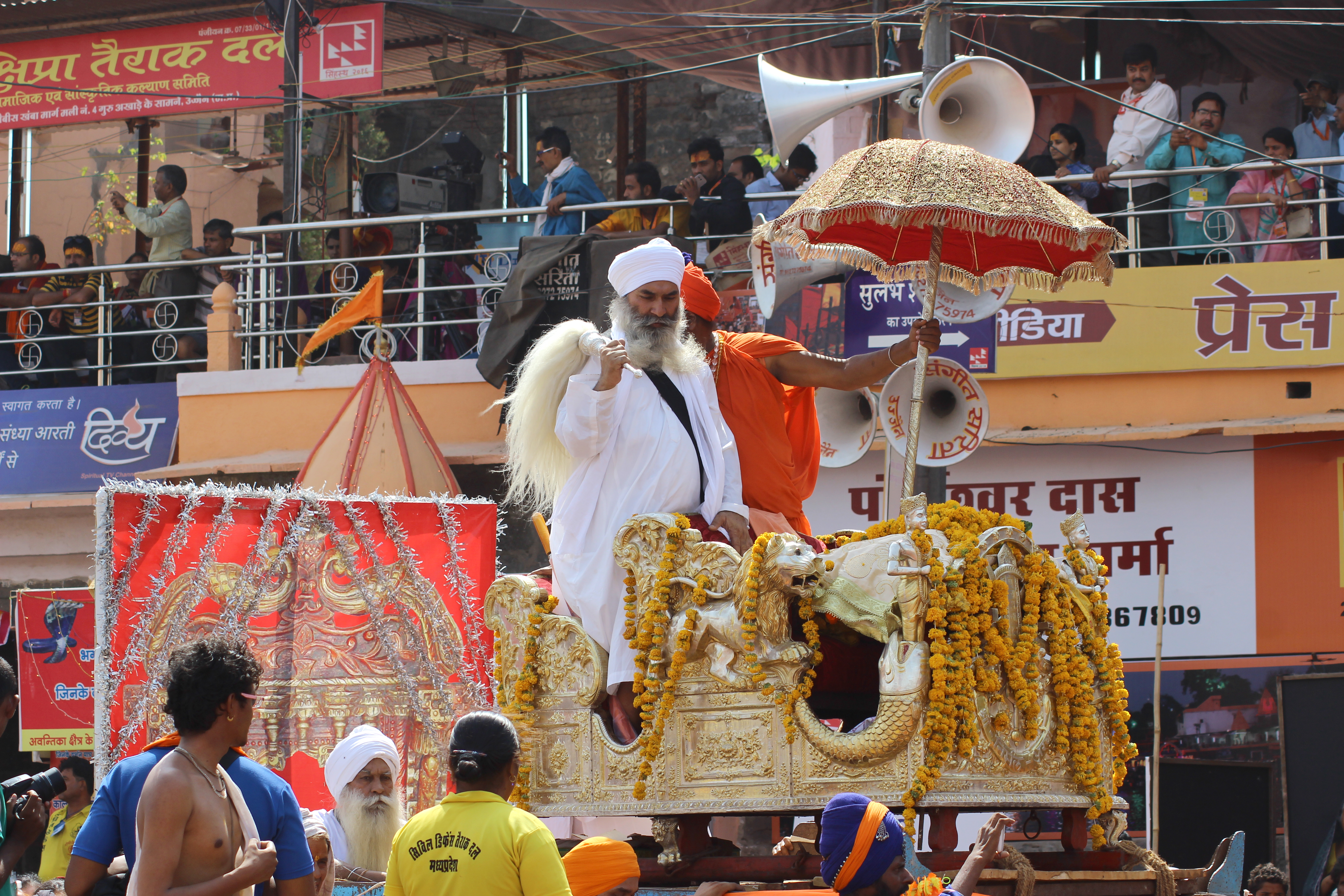
Panchayati Akhada Nirmal Shahi Snan Sawari

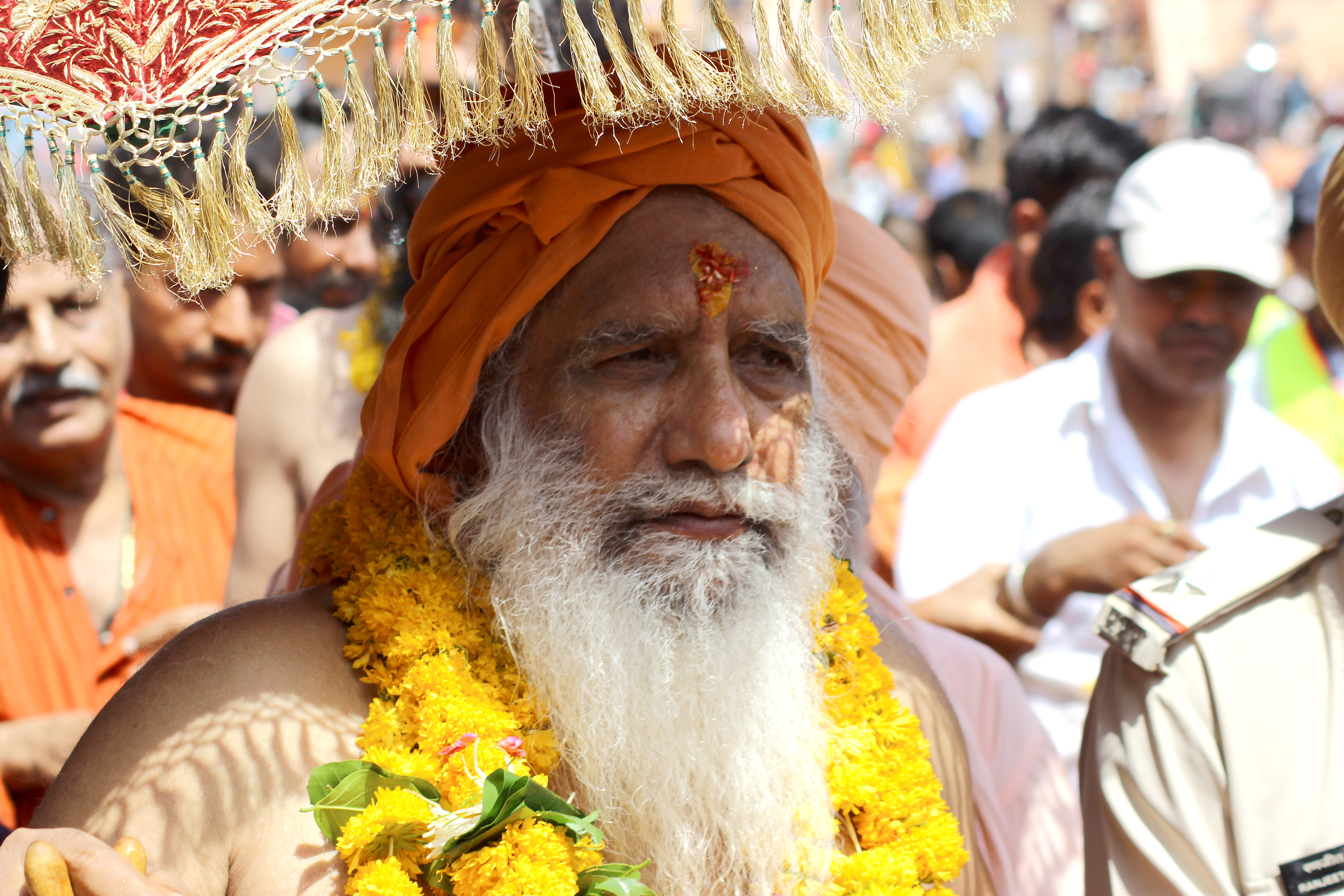
Panchayati Akhada Nirmal Shahi Snan

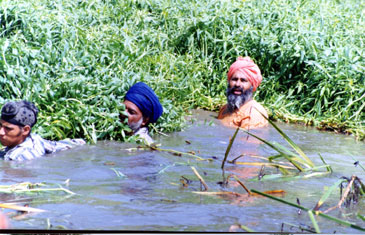
Niramla Sant Balbir Singh Seechewal
