= Jwalapur =

Coordinates: 29°55′33″N 78°06′27″E

Jwalapur ज्वालापुर
- Locality
- Location in Uttarakhand, India Jwalapur (India)
- Country: India
- State: Uttarakhand
- District: Haridwar
- City: Haridwar

Government
  - Body: Haridwar Municipal Corporation

Languages
  - Official: Hindi
- Time zone: UTC+5:30 (IST)
- PIN: 249407
- Vehicle registration: UK-08

Jwalapur is a town, a pargana and commercial district of Haridwar in Haridwar district in Uttarakhand. Historically, it was a separate settlement adjoining Haridwar; however, it is currently administered by the Haridwar Municipal Corporation. Located near the Ganga River Swami Vivekanand Park, and various temples, including those near Gau Ghat.

Jwalapur is one of Haridwar's principal traditional market areas and wholesale trading districts for Haridwar and nearby rural areas. Its commercial districts include Kathehra Bazaar, Peeth Bazaar, Chowk Bazaar and the old grain, vegetable and grass markets, Purani Anaj Mandi, Purani Sabzi Mandi and Purani Ghas Mandi.

== History ==
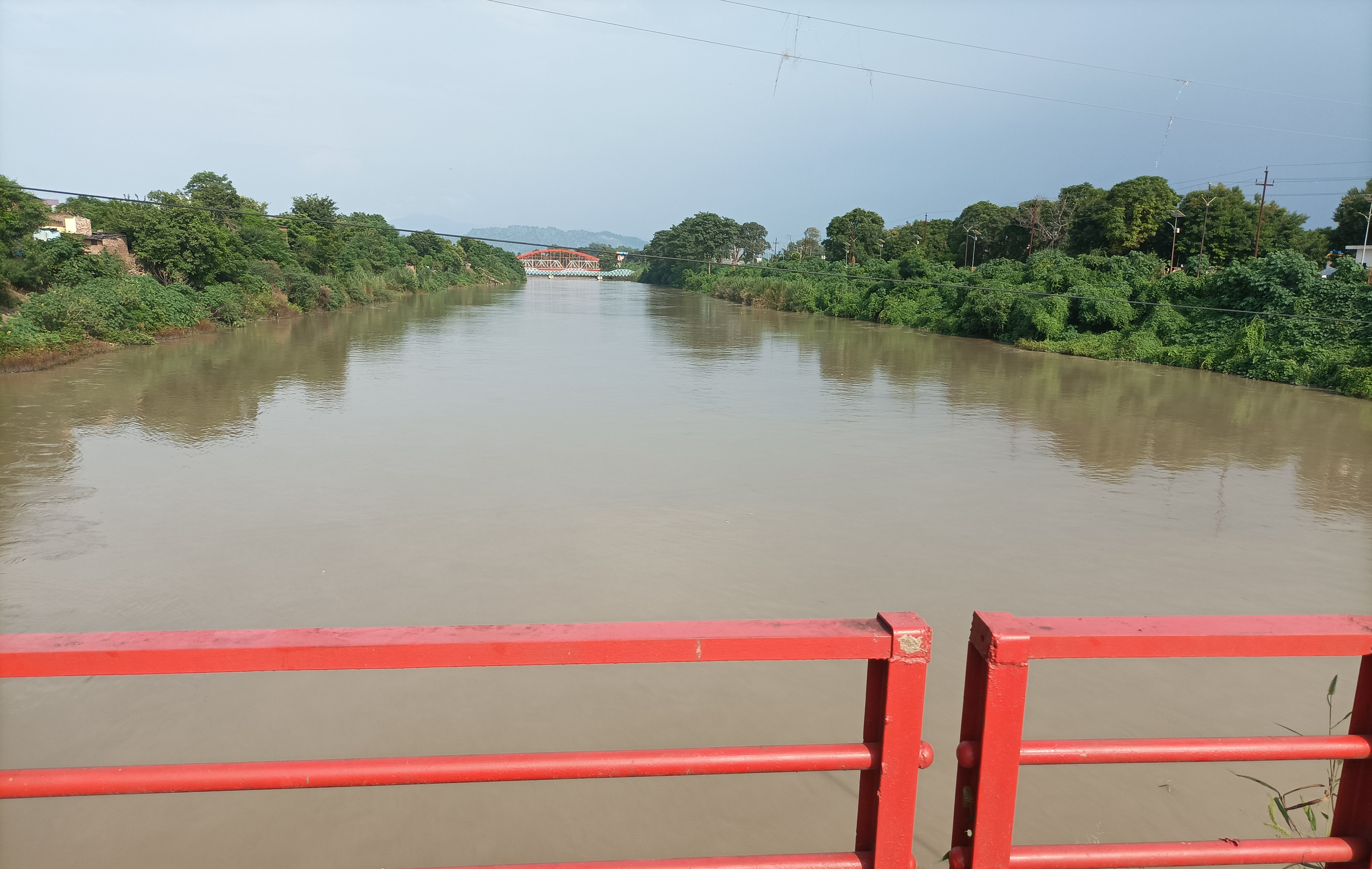
A view of River Ganges around Jwalapur, in Haridwar.

Jwalapur developed as a settlement adjoining the historic pilgrimage city of Haridwar. During the Mughal period, the wider administrative area later known as the Jwalapur pargana was called Bhogpur. The 1909 Saharanpur Gazetteer records that the area continued for some time to be known as “Bhogpur alias Jwalapur”. In 1783, during Haridwar Kumbh Mela, it is mentioned to be 8 km from the city of Haridwar. The District Census Handbook for Haridwar records that fighting took place at Jwalapur, Haridwar, Kankhal and Roorkee during the Indian Rebellion of 1857. In May 1868, Jwalapur, Haridwar and Kankhal were combined to form the Haridwar municipality, although the three continued to be regarded as distinct towns. The town was temporarily evacuated during the outbreak of plague in 1898, which helped in the containment the outbreak.

In 1901, it was a pargana in the Saharanpur district of the United Province, comprised 116 villages and covered approximately 149.55 square miles (387.3 km^{2}). By the mid-20th century, Jwalapur had been incorporated into the municipal limits of the Municipal Board of Haridwar, and administered by the Haridwar Municipal Corporation. Subsequent urban expansion joined Jwalapur more closely with Haridwar, Kankhal, Ranipur and newer residential and industrial areas, around BHEL, Ranipur township and Shivalik Nagar.

== Administration ==
Jwalapur is administered as part of the Haridwar Municipal Corporation. The locality also gives its name to the Jwalapur Assembly constituency, a constituency of the Uttarakhand Legislative Assembly reserved for candidates belonging to the Scheduled Castes.

== Education ==
In 1907, Gurukul Mahavidyalaya was founded at Jwalapur by the Arya Samaj scholar Swami Darshanananda for Sanskrit and traditional Indian education.

== Transport ==
Jwalapur railway station is situated on the railway line serving Haridwar Junction railway station, under the Moradabad division of the Northern Railway zone. Jwalapur became the terminus of the first section of the Laksar–Dehradun line when the Oudh and Rohilkhand Railway opened the broad-gauge railway from Laksar Junction to Jwalapur on 1 January 1886. The line was extended from Jwalapur to Haridwar on 20 August of the same year.

== See also ==
- Haridwar
- Kankhal
- Ranipur, Uttarakhand
- Jwalapur Assembly constituency
