= Kankhal =

Kankhal कनखल
- Locality
- Location in Uttarakhand, India Kankhal (India)
- Coordinates: 29.93°N 78.15°E
- Country: India
- State: Uttarakhand
- District: Haridwar
- City: Haridwar

Government
  - Body: Haridwar Municipal Corporation

Languages
  - Official: Hindi
- Time zone: UTC+5:30 (IST)
- PIN: 249408
- Telephone code: 01334
- Vehicle registration: UK-08

Kankhal is a historic pilgrimage town in Haridwar in the Haridwar district of Uttarakhand state in India. Historically, a distinct town adjoining Haridwar, Kankhal was brought under a common municipal administration with Haridwar and Jwalapur in 1868 due to subsequent urban expansion. It is now administered by the Haridwar Municipal Corporation. It is regarded as one of the five traditional pilgrimage sites, 'Panch Tirth' within Haridwar, with other spots being Gangadwara (Har ki Pauri), Kushwart (Kusha Ghat in Haridwar), Bilwa Teerth (Mansa Devi Temple) and Neel Parvat (Chandi Devi Temple).

Known as Kanakhala in Sanskrit literature, the pilgrimage site is mentioned in the Mahabharata, Vayu Purana and in Kalidasa's poem Meghaduta, written in 4th-century CE. The town later developed as a centre of temples, akharas, ashrams, pilgrimage residences and old 'havelis with wall paintings built by Hindu pilgrims in the 19th century.

Its main sacred sites include the Daksheswar Mahadev Temple and Sati Kund, which are associated in Hindu tradition with the sacrifice of Daksha, the self-immolation of Sati and the origin of Virabhadra. Kankhal also has a host of ashrams, including Ramakrishna Mission Sevashrama established in 1901, Ma Anandamayi Ashram and numerous other ashrams.

== Kankhal in scriptures ==
Kankhal is mentioned in Mahabharata as follows,

"Here, O king, before thee is the Kanakhala range, the favourite resort of sages. 'And yonder is the mighty river Ganga. Here, in ancient times, the holy sage Sanatkumara attained ascetic success. O scion of the Ajamidha race, by performing thy ablutions here in this river, thou wilt be freed from all thy sins.

— The Mahabharata, Book 3: Vana Parva: Tirtha-yatra Parva: Section CXXXV.

"Bathing in Gangadwara (Haridwar) and Kusavarta...as also in Kankhala, one is sure to become cleansed of all one's sins and then ascend to heaven."

— The Mahabharata, Book 13: Anusasanika Parva: Section XXV, p. 130.

== History ==
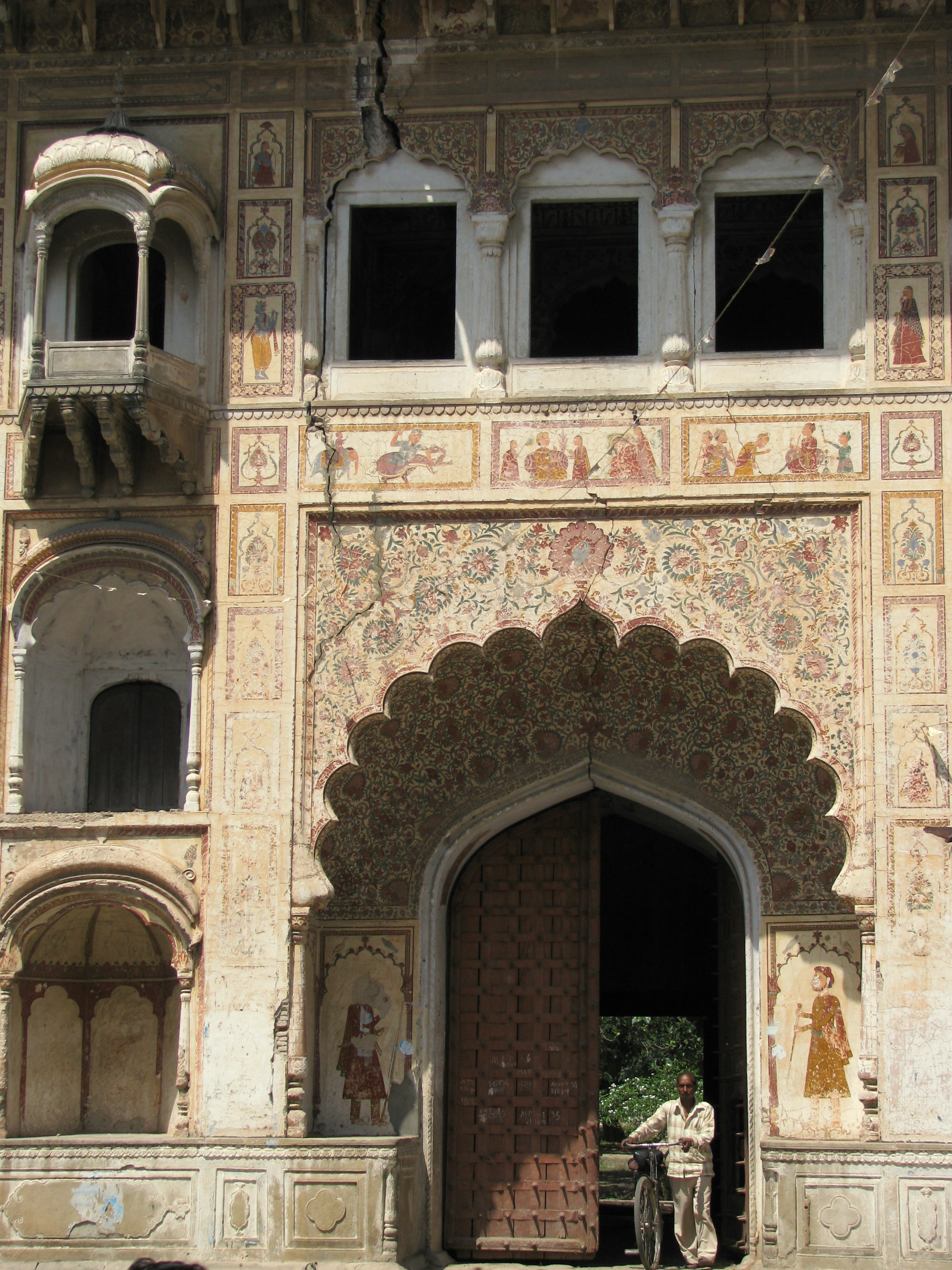
Front facade of Naya Udasin Akhara, Kankhal, with elaborate frescoes, in 2009

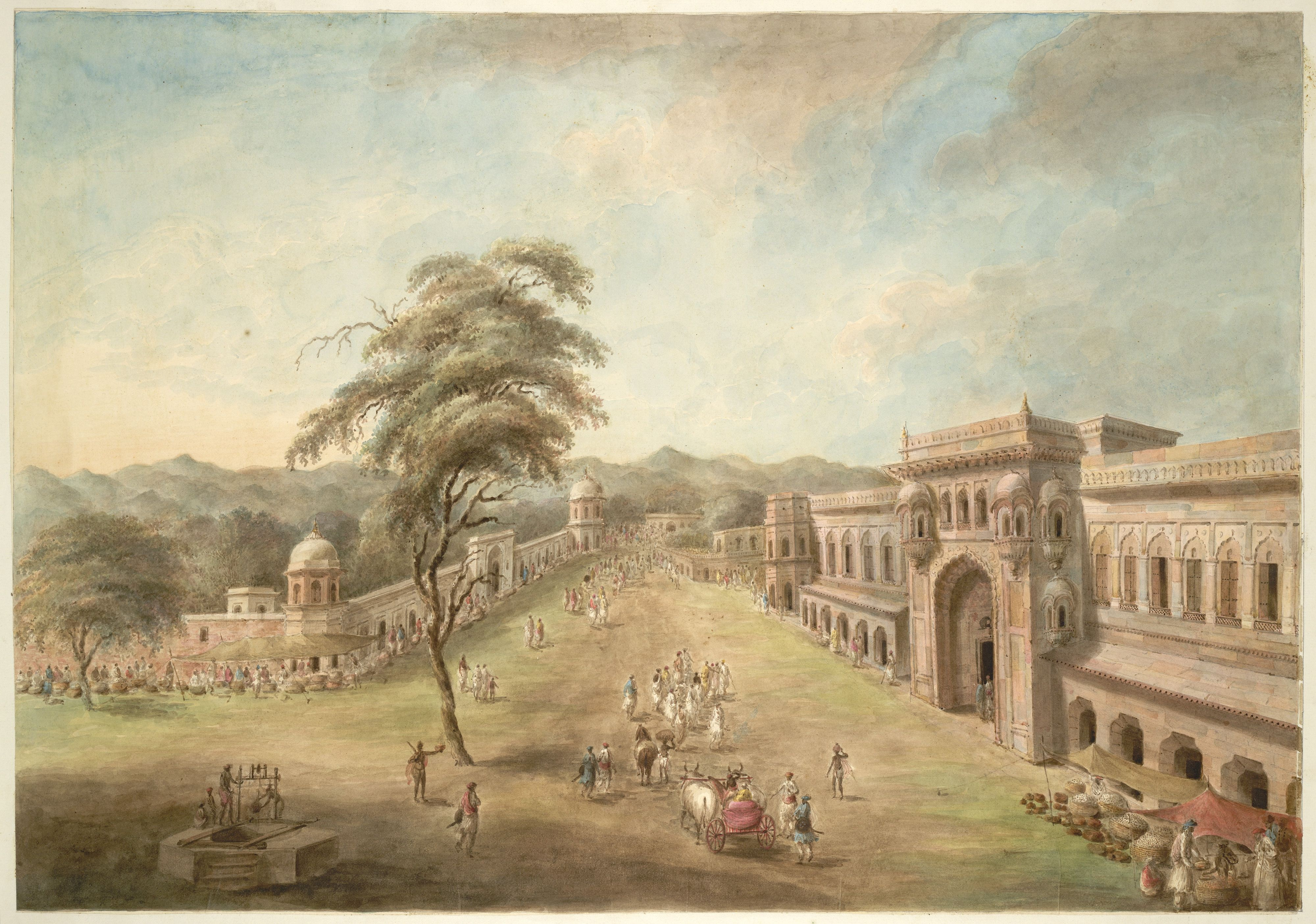
The gateway and facade of the chowk at Kankhal, 1814

Traditionally, Kankhal is considered to be the summer capital and Kurukshetra the winter capital of Shiva. God Shiva after ascending to the throne visited plain areas, the present Haridwar.

In the Vanaparva of the Mahabharat, where sage Dhaumya tells Yudhishthira about the tirthas of India, Gangadwar, i.e., Haridwar and Kankhal, have been referred to. Kankhal also finds mention in the poem Meghaduta (Cloud messenger), of the 3rd century AD, classical Sanskrit poet and dramatist, Kalidas.

When the first Sikh Guru, Guru Nanak (1469–1539), visited Haridwar in 1504 AD, on the Baisakhi day, he went on to visit Kankhal, en route to Kotdwara in Garhwal, his visit is commorarted by Gurudwara Nanakwara neat Sati Ghatadd. During the Gorkha invasion of Garhwal kingdom in 1803–04, Pradyumna Shah of Garhwal and his family took refuge at Kankhal with their hereditary priest; following Pradyumna Shah's death, his son Sudarshan Shah and other members of the royal family continued to reside there for several years. Kankhal also finds mention in the travel accounts of Sister Nivedita (1867–1911), a disciple of Swami Vivekananda, wherein she mentions that long before Haridwar became popular, Kankhal had been a center for education and pilgrimage

Work on the Upper Ganges canal commenced in April 1842, between Haridwar and Kankhal. During the Indian Rebellion of 1857 fighting took place at Jwalapur, Haridwar, Kankhal and Roorkee. As late as early 19th century it used to be a separate town, from Haridwar and Mayapur in the areas, though due to urban development it now falls within the city limits of Haridwar. During the nineteenth century, Kankhal also developed as an important centre of Hindu and Sikh-associated monastic institutions. The Udasin Panchayati Naya Akhara, founded in 1846, established its principal centre at Kankhal, while the Nirmala, Nirbani, Niranjani and other akharas maintained establishments in the town.

Apart from being home various temples and ashrams of various sects, Kankhal also has numerous old havelis, mansion, now visitors attraction, especially heritage tours. Mostly built in previous century, they are known for their frescoes and haveli architecture, and were built by princely states, and zamindars for their stay in the pilgrimage town during summer months.

== Geography ==
Kankhal is located at 29.93°N 78.15°E. It has an average elevation of 260 metres (853 feet).

== Important places in Kankhal ==
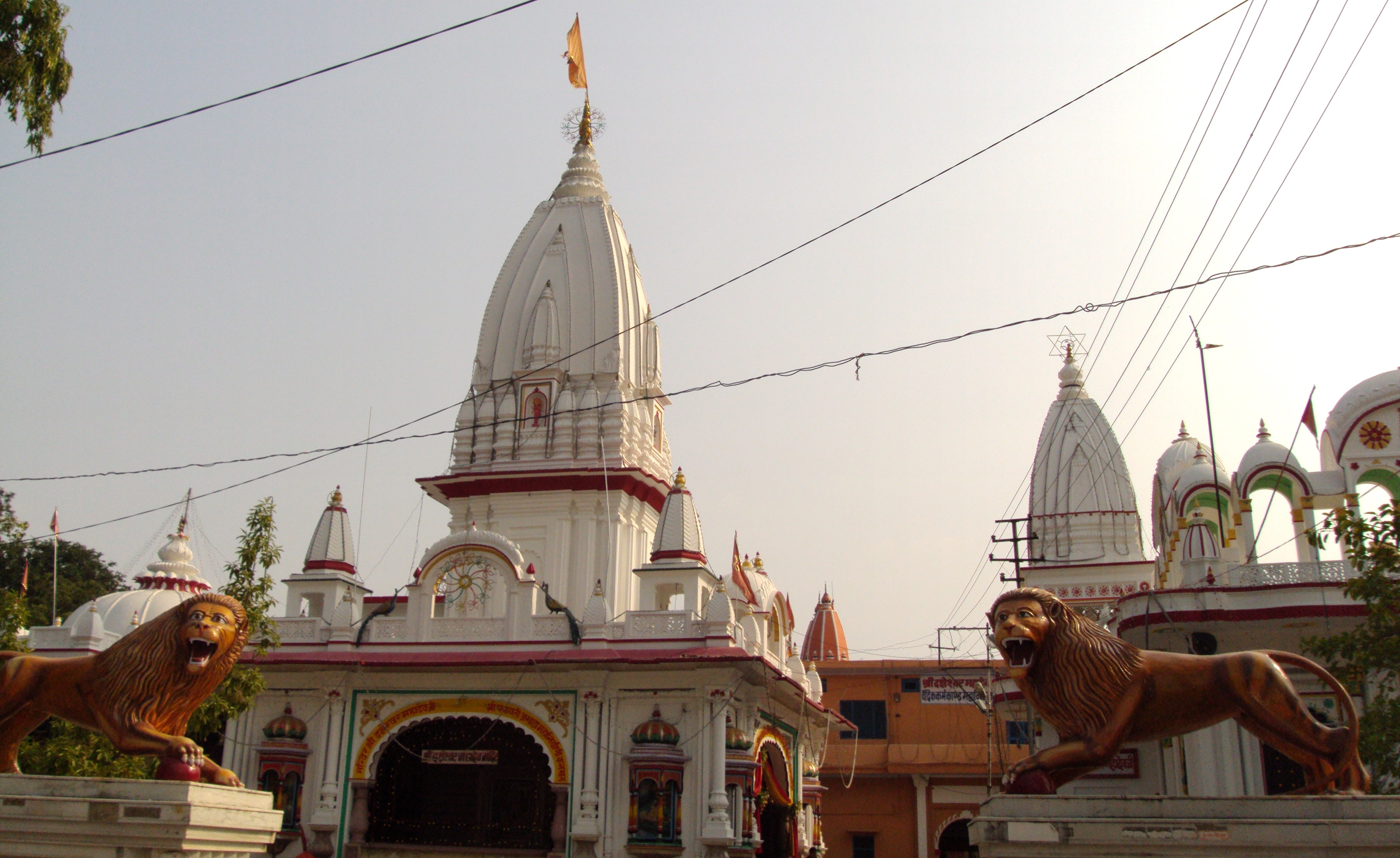
Daksheswara Mahadev Temple, Kankhal

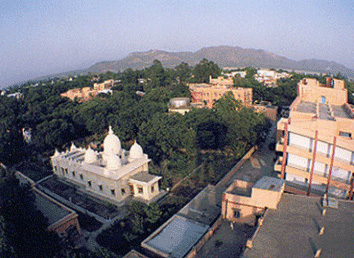
An aerial view of the Ramakrishna Mission Sevasrama, Kankhal

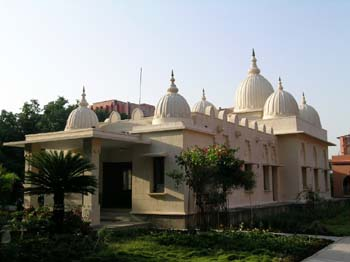
Sri Ramakrishna Temple, RKMS, Kankhal, Haridwar

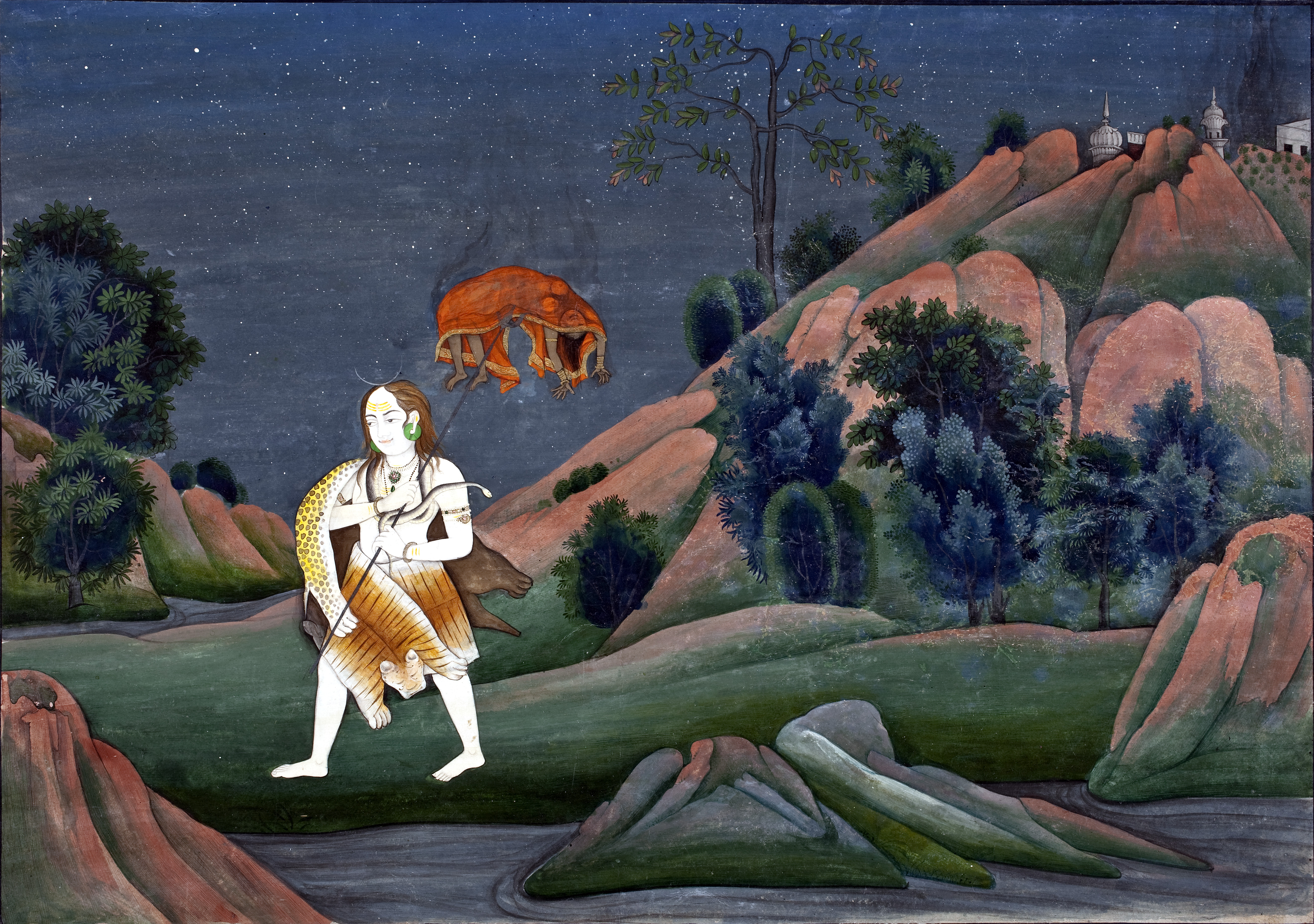
Shiva carrying the corpse of his consort Dakshayani (Sati)

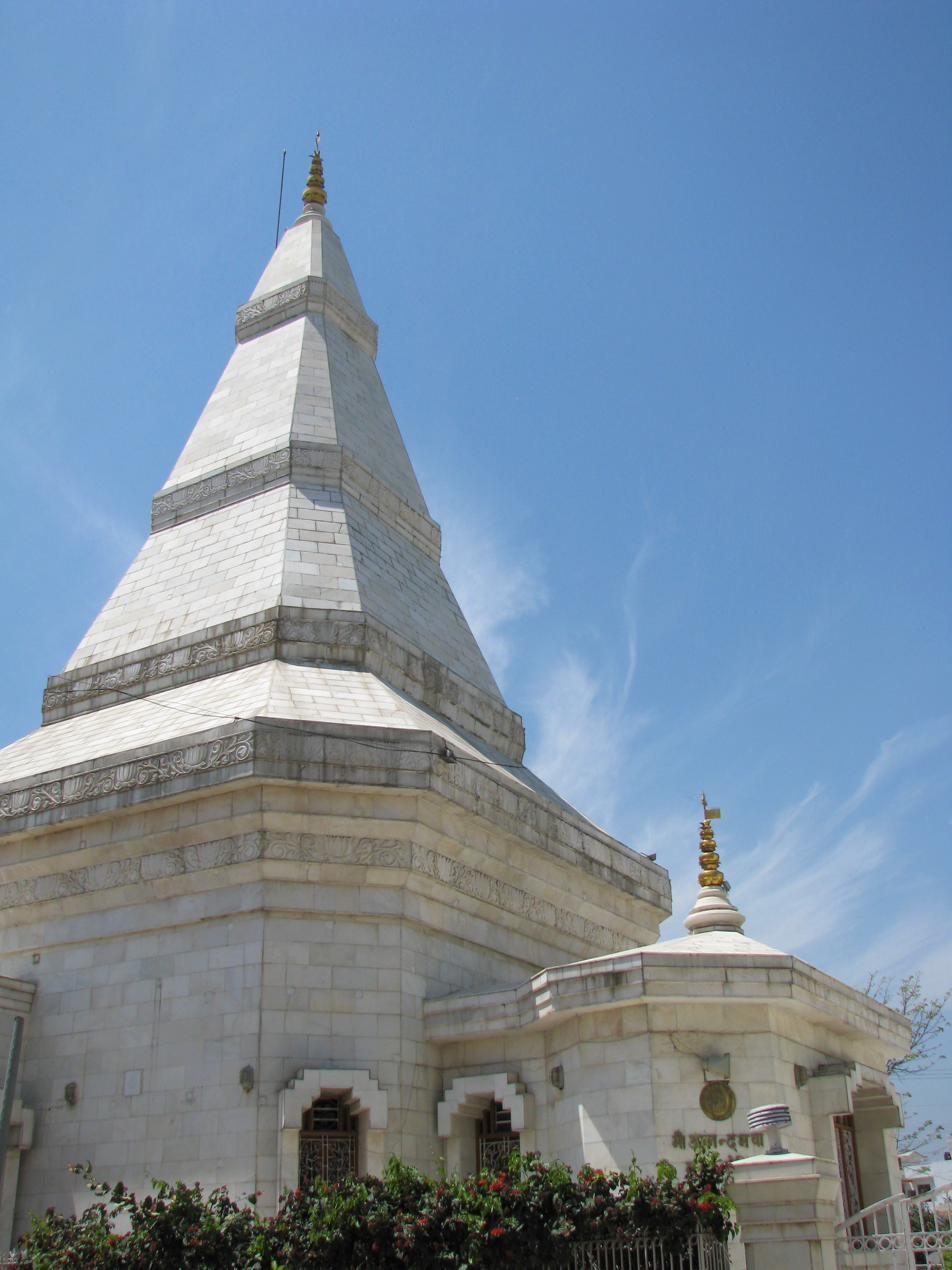
Anandamayi Ma Samadhi Mandir, Kankhal, Haridwar

कनखल श्मशान घाट

- Daksheswara Mahadev Temple - Kankhal is most known for the ancient temple of Daksheswara Mahadev temple, situated in the south Kankhal town. The present temple was built by Queen Dhankaur in 1810 AD and rebuilt in 1962. Next to the temple is the 'Daksha Ghat' on the Ganges, and close by is the Nileshwar Mahadev Temple. Much of the details of the famous Ashvamedha Yagna (Horse Sacrifice) of Daksha are available in the Vayu Purana
- Sati Kund, another well-known mythological heritage worth visit is situated in the Kankhal region. Legend has it that Sati laid down her life in this kund
- Ramakrishna Mission Sevashrama - Ramakrishna Mission Sevashrama, Kankhal [ RKMS ], situated in the city of Haridwar [ Uttarakhand ], is a 150-bed multi-specialty charitable hospital founded in 1901 at behest of Swami Vivekananda to cater to the medical needs of this region. In its long odyssey spanning over a century, it has grown in size, widening the spectrum of services to meet the varied dimensions of health hazards and during this time it has treated more than 10 million patients.RKMS has been instrumental in presenting a road map for bridging the impoverished society – modern treatment methodology and has proved to be the lodestar for the healthcare units. Its altruistic approach of treatment, an umbilical and hence a distinguishing feature from its inception, caught the attention of luminaries like Mahatma Gandhi, * Sir J C Bose etc. who visited this centre. Being the oldest Ashrama ( after Ramakrishna Home of Service, Varanasi) of the Ramakrishna Order, this Sevashrama bears the hallowed memory of several direct disciples of Shri Ramakrishna Paramhamsa. Swami Brahmananda, Swami Turiyananda and Swami Niranjanananda spent their time in intense spiritual practice in this Ashrama.
- Anandamoyi Ma Ashram - This quaint ashram was the residence of this Hindu saint Sri Anandamoyi Ma (1896–1982), and also houses her samādhi shrine and a museum dedicated to her, in the vicinity.
- Abheda Ganga Mayya AsramThe ashram is under a trust called Abheda Ganga Mayya Trust. The founder of the trust was Bhajananda Swamiji, the main disciple of Swami Abhedananda Maharaj. It is currently headed by Swami Krishnanda.
- Dera Baba Dargah Singh ji, Gurudwara - Situated near Sati Ghat, this Gurudwara is dedicated to the third Sikh Guru, Guru Amar Das, who visited this place many times during his lifetime, is situated near Sati Ghat in Kankhal; it is managed by the Nirmala Sikhs, a scholarly sect of the Sikhs, who came here in 1705, after evacuating from Anandpur, Punjab and made it their headquarters
- Gurukul Kangri University - Situated in Kankhal, on the banks of river Ganges, on Haridwar-Jwalapur bypass road, Gurukul Kangri is one of the oldest Universities of India, founded in 1902 by Swami Shraddhananda (1856–1926), according to the tenets of Swami Dayananda Saraswati, the founder of Arya Samaj. It was visited by British Trade Union leader Charles Freer Andrews and British Prime Minister, Ramsay MacDonald, to study the unique Gurukul based education system. Mahatma Gandhi visited its campus three times, and stayed in its sprawling and serene campus for extended periods of time, most notably in 1916, when on 20 March, he spoke at Gurukul Anniversary.

== Transport ==
Kankhal is well connected by road to National Highway 58, between Delhi and Manapass. Nearest railway stations are at Jwalapur and Haridwar. The nearest airport is Jolly Grant Airport, Dehradun, though Indira Gandhi International Airport in New Delhi is preferred.

Its neighbouring towns are Jwalapur, Haridwar, and Laksar.

== See also ==
- Ramakrishna Mission Sevashrama Kankhal
