= Nilkanth Mahadev =

Hindu temple dedicated to Nilkanth

Neelkanth Mahadev Temple
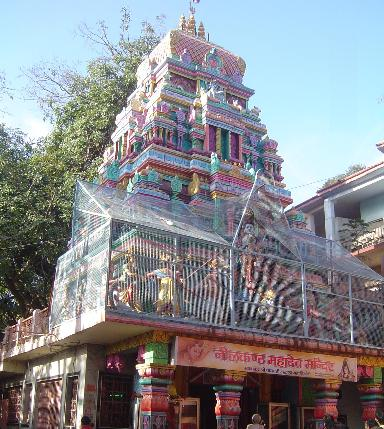

- Location in Uttarakhand

Religion
- Affiliation: Hinduism
- District: Pauri Garhwal
- Deity: Neelkanth (Shiva)
- Festival: Maha Shivaratri

Location
- Location: Near Pauri town and Rishikesh
- State: Uttarakhand
- Country: India
- Coordinates: 30.0807°N 78.3409°E

Architecture
- Creator: Mekh Chand (Shadhu)

Neelkanth Mahadev Temple is a Hindu temple dedicated to Nilkanth, an aspect of Shiva. Located approximately 32 km from Rishikesh in the Pauri Garhwal district of Uttarakhand, India, the temple is constructed in the Dravidian architectural style.

A popular Hindu pilgrimage site, the temple is surrounded by dense forests and is adjacent to the mountain ranges of Nar-Narayan. It is enveloped between the valleys of Manikoot, Brahmakoot, and Vishnukoot and is located at the confluence of the rivers Pankaja and Madhumati.

== Legend ==
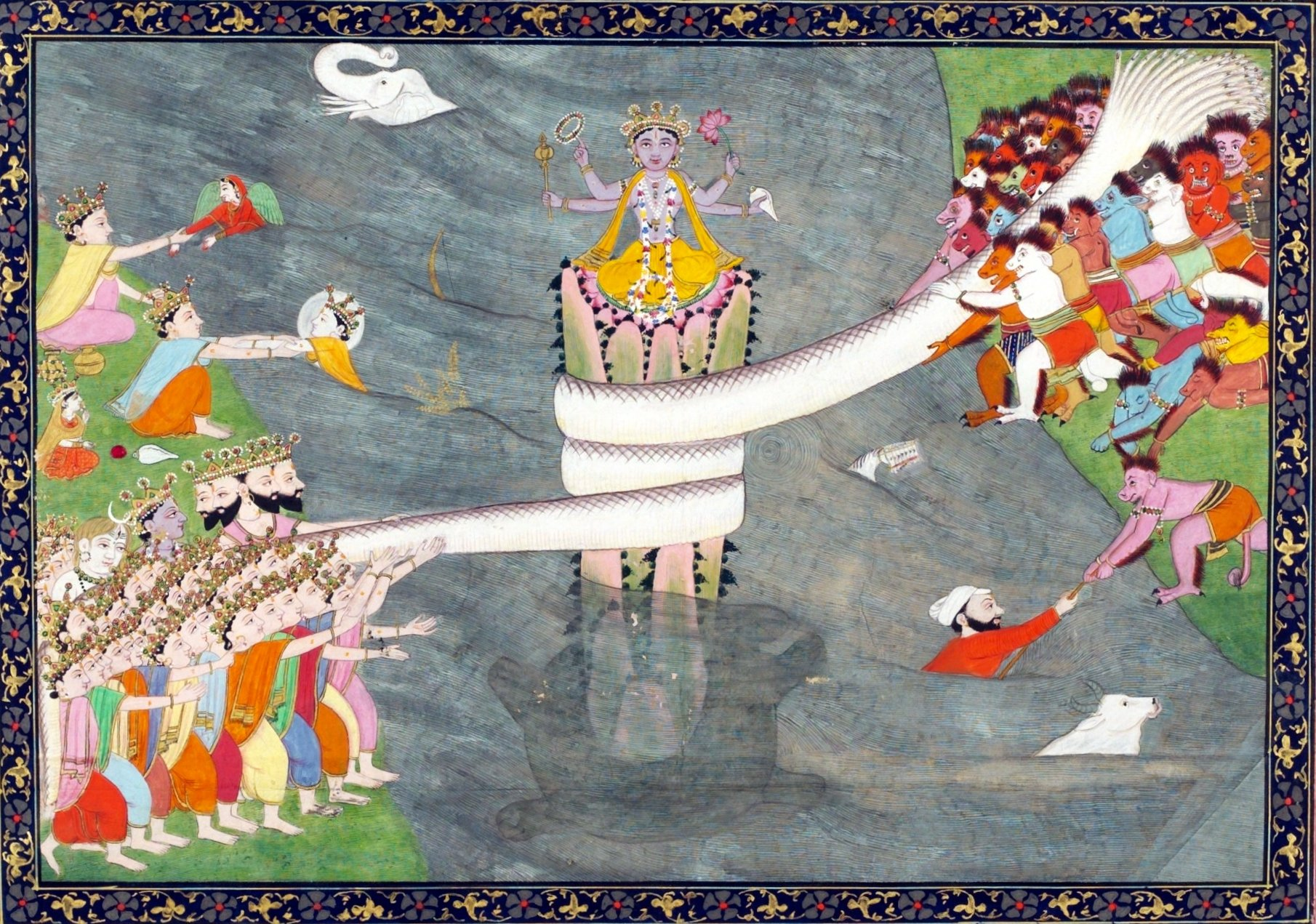
Shiva consumed the poison Halahala that originated from the sea during the Samudramanthan (churning of the ocean) ca 1870.

According to Hindu sacred texts, the place where the Neelkanth Mahadev Temple currently stands is the sacred location where Shiva consumed the poison (Halahala) that originated from the sea when Devas (Gods) and Asuras (Demons) churned the ocean in order to obtain Amrita. This poison that emanated during the Samudramanthan (churning of the ocean) made his throat blue in color. Thus, Shiva is also known as Neelkanth, literally meaning The Blue Throated One.

As per Shruti-Smriti Puran, Devas and Asuras churned the ocean to obtain Amruta. 14 ratnas were obtained of which one was the "Kalkut" poison capable of destroying the whole world. This was consumed by Lord Shiva making his throat blue. To allay the effect of Kalkut poison, Lord Shiva meditated for 60 thousand years here at the confluence of Pankaja and Madhumati river beneath the Panchpani tree where the current Garbha Gruh of the temple is constructed. After his penance, Lord Shiva installed the current day "throat" shaped shivaling beneath the Panchpani tree.

== The Temple ==
The temple has a Gopura or the shikhara as in any Pandya (Tamil) style temple and is raised high in a tiered way in pyramid style. Motifs and Friezes are carved on these towers. The shikhara of the temple is adorned with sculptures of various Devas and Asuras depicting the Samudramanthan. Neelkanth Mahadev in the form of Shivalinga is the presiding deity of the temple. The temple complex also has a natural spring where devotees usually take a holy bath before entering the premises of surrounded by dense forests.

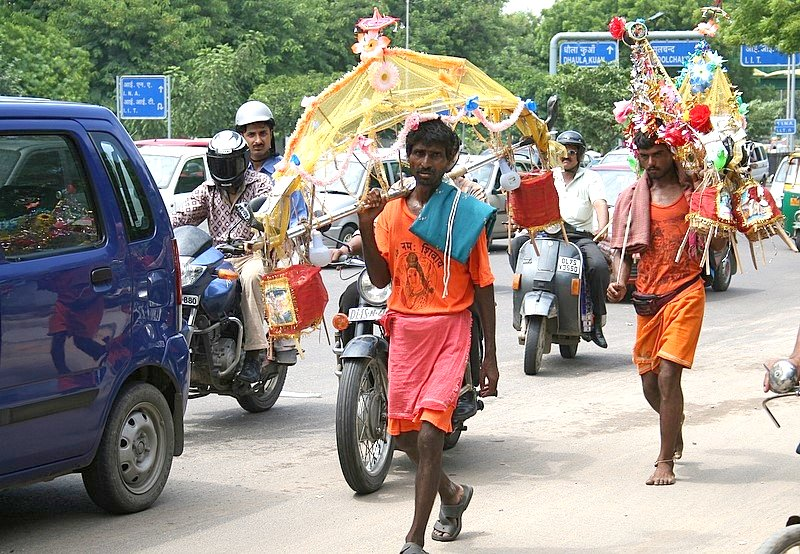
Kawarias walking towards temple

== Festivals ==
Maha Shivaratri is the most prominent festival celebrated in the temple and many devotees flock to the temple during the festival. The devotees who pay a visit to Neelkanth Mahadev make an offering of Bael leaves, coconut, flowers, milk, honey, fruits and water to Lord Shiva. The temple observes two fairs that are held annually on the occasions of Maha Shivratri (Feb-Mar) and Shivratri of Shraavana (month of Hindu calendar) (July-Aug) during which the devotees (Kawarias) trek from Haridwar to Neelkanth Mahadev Temple.
