= Manimajra State =

Former Sikh kingdom

Coordinates: 30.7140384°N 76.8371277°E

- January 1764–1875
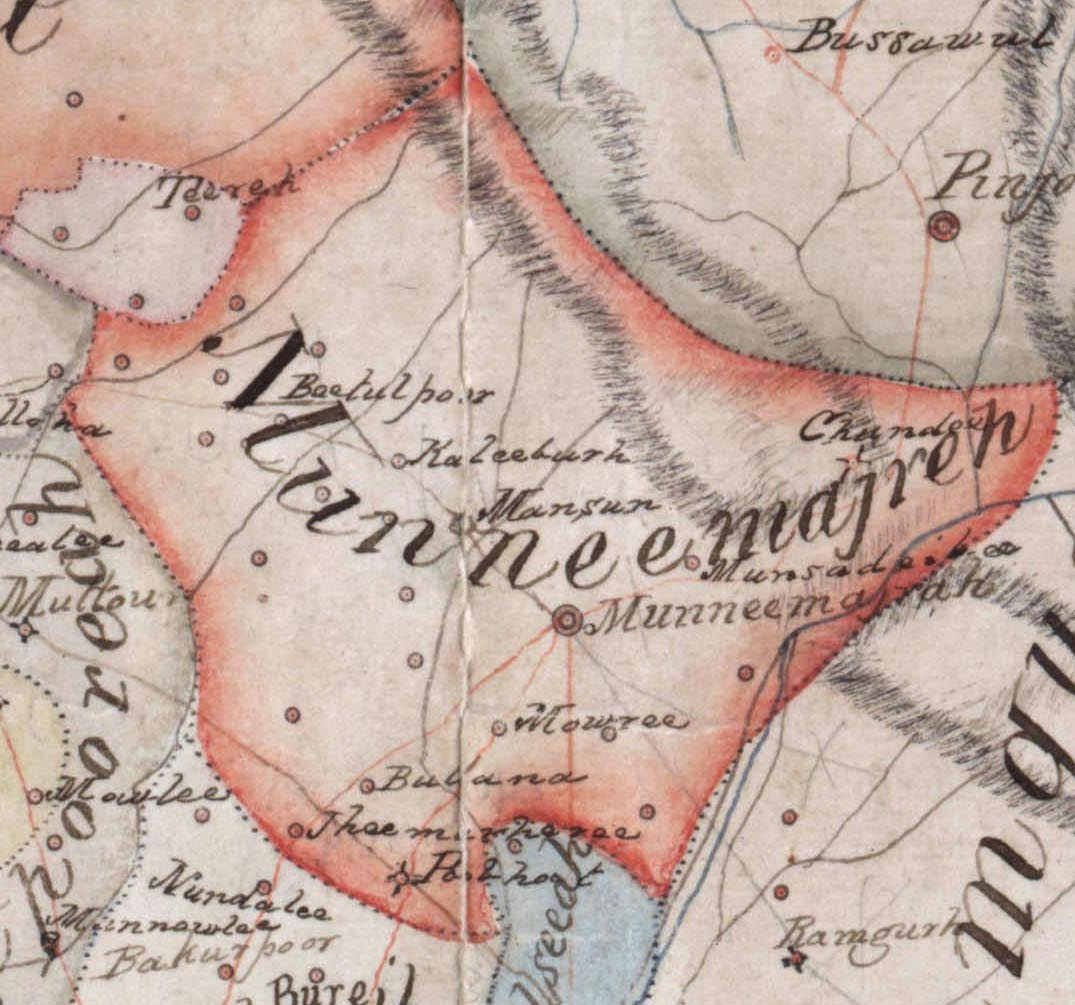
- Detail of the main, continuous tract of territory of Manimajra State from a map created by the British East India Company, ca.1829–1835 (not including its exclaves viewable on the full-map)
- Capital: Manimajra
- Recognised regional languages: Puadhi

Government
  - First ruler: Gharib Das
  - Last ruler: Bhagwan Das
- History
  - Established: January 1764
  - Disestablished: 1875
- Today part of: Chandigarh Capital Region, India

Manimajra State was a Sikh kingdom and later jagir (estate) based in the Manimajra area from 1764 to 1875. The area is in the present-day region of Chandigarh. (Note: Alternatively spelt as 'Mani Majra' with a space or hyphenated as 'Mani-Majra'.) The state had poor relations with Patiala and Nahan states, often warring with them.

== Etymology ==
The word Manimajra may derive from Mani Ram (fl. 16th century), the name of a local zamindar of the area and ancestor of the later Manimajra royal family. Another theory is that it is derived from the settlers from Manaa village, whom were called Mani, that Bhagwan Singh had invited to settle around the royal fort.

== History ==
=== Origin ===
Manimajra village was founded in the 16th century by Mani Ram, who was the forefather of the later state's rulers. Manimajra eventually grew to become a town. Manimajra was originally a pargana of Sirhind sarkar (province). During the tenure of Zain Khan, the Mughal governor of Sirhind, Ganga Ram was employed as the revenue officer of Manimajra pargana. The Manimajra pargana at the time consisted of a chaurasi (group of 84 villages).

=== Foundation by Gharib Das and his rule ===
Sirhind was conquered by Sikh forces in January 1764 and around then is when Ganga Ram's son, Gharib Das, took control over the Manimajra pargana. In the same year, Gharib Das paid a nazan totalling 25,000 rupees to Jassa Singh Ahluwalia. Gharib Das extended the territory of the state to consist of 45 villages of Manimajra, 126 villages of Mullanpur, 6 villages of Chandigarh, and 7 villages of Pinjore, with the total summing up to 184 villages. In circa 1766, Gharib Das took possession of the valley of Pinjore. Pinjore was famed throughout the region for its gardens and fortresses.

Much of the territory taken by the nascent state originally belonged to the state of Nahan (also known as Sirmur). Gharib Das also seized the Pinjore Gardens, much to the dismay of Kirat Prakash of Sirmur State. The Nahan ruler teamed-up with Patiala State, with a meeting between the two states' rulers occurring at Banur, where an alliance was established through the ceremonial exchanging of each-other's turban. Amar Singh of Patiala sent his general, Bakhshi Lakhna Dogar, alongside 1,000 troops, to assist the Nahan ruler in conquering Pinjore from Manimajra. The two states, being joined also by the forces of Hindur (Nalagarh) and Kahlur (Bilaspur), launched a joint-attack on Manimajra State, with Gharib Das being defeated. Pinjore Fort was then held by Ganga Ram as Gharib Das was away for likely a pilgrimage. The Manimajra forces at Pinjore Fort withstood the enemy siege for a month and a half but finally fell after Ganga Ram was killed from a gunshot. After the siege in 1768, the valley of Pinjore was annexed by Nahan as a result. However, Patiala's forces suffered in the campaign, losing around 300 troops. Gharib Das returned but was not able to wrest control back over the Pinjore Fort.

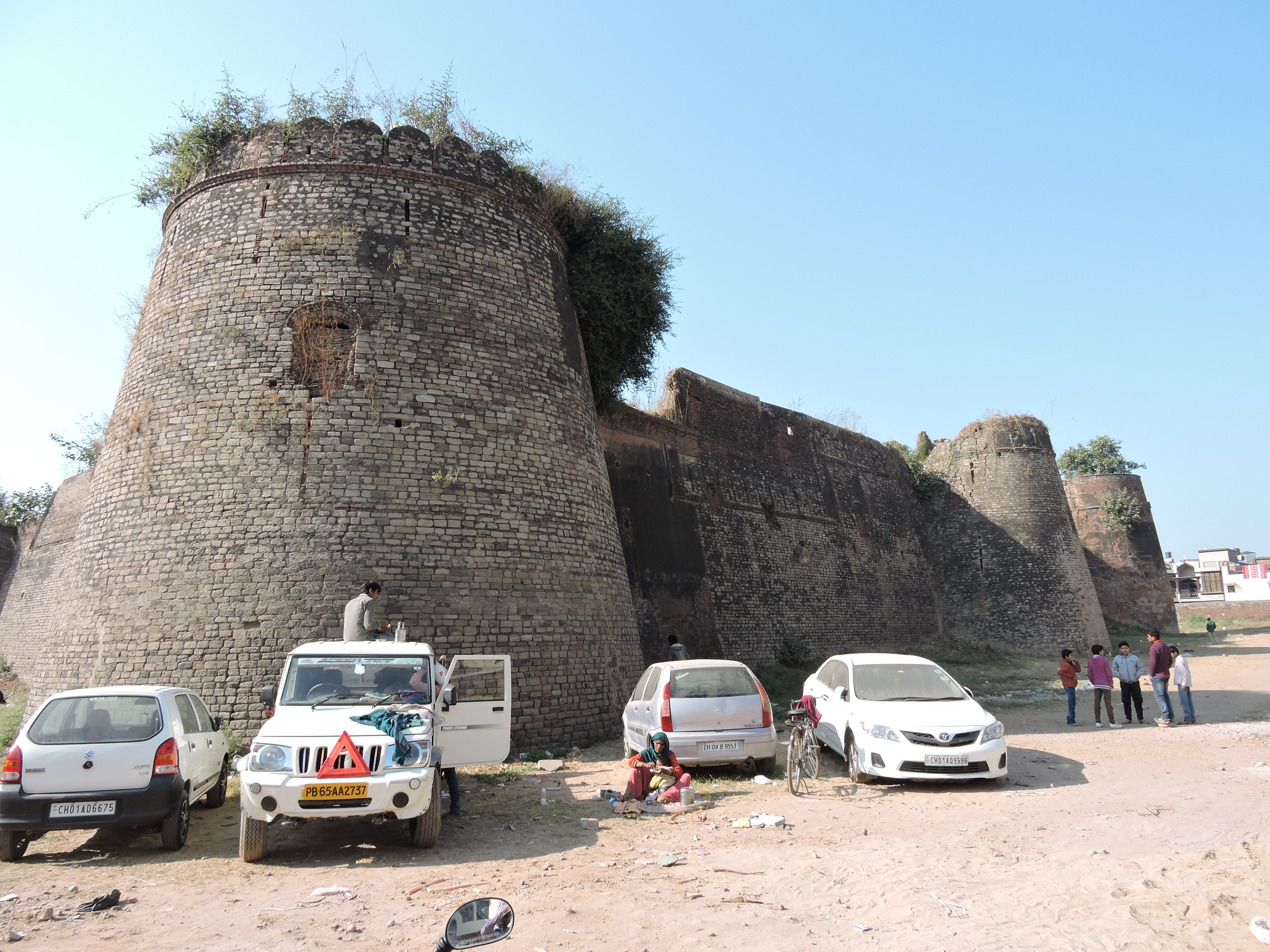
Manimajra Fort's east side view, Sector 13, Chandigarh, India, December 2015

Gharib Das formed an alliance with Hari Singh of Sialba and Ropar (Ropar State). The joint forces of Manimajra and Ropar launched an attack on the Nahan forces at Pinjore and its surrounding areas, winning control over the area Chandangarh (now called Chandi Mandar). Disturbances also occurred in the Banur parganah of Patiala State. In-response to this, in 1778 Amar Singh of Patiala State launched an attack on Manimajra and Ropar states. Due to this threat, Gharib Das took shelter at the Manimajra Fort, resisting the Patiala forces for a period of three months. Gharib Das finally afterwards appealed for peace by paying a hefty monetary sum to the Patiala ruler. Thus, the Patiala forces turned their attention toward Ropar State under Hari Singh of Sialba and marched there. However, Hari Singh of Ropar State was backed-up by the joint-forces of his allies, namely Karam Singh Shahid of Shahzadpur, Gurdit Singh of Ladwa, Gurbakhsh Singh of Ambala, Karam Singh Nirmala of Shahabad Markanda, Diwan Singh of Sikandra, and Rae Singh and Bhag Singh of Buria, leading to the routing of the Patiala forces. Hundreds of Patiala's troops were killed, including the general Bakhshi Lakhna Dogar whilst Diwan Nanun Mai was wounded. Two Patiala State generals, Chandu Singh and Mahan Singh, were taken as prisoners-of-war. Amar Singh of Patiala himself managed to escape death or capture.

Gharib Das of Manimajra died in 1783, being succeeded by two sons: Gopal Das and Prakash Chand, with Gopal Das being the elder son.

=== Under Gopal Das ===
In 1785, Gopal Das possessed a military force consisting of 200 horses, 300 foot soldiers, and 4 guns. In 1804, Jodh Singh conquered the fortress at Chandimandar from Nahan and bestowed it upon the rulers of Manimajra State. In 1807, Ranjit Singh of Lahore State intervened in a dispute within the Patiala royal family, whereby an estate was granted to Rani Aus Kour for the maintenance of herself and her son, Karam Singh. The estate had an annual revenue of 50,000 rupees and consisted of the areas of Banur, Manimajra, Sunour, Surali Bissoli, and Minarthal. Due to this, Karam Singh of Patiala fought with Manimajra State over the waters of the Ghaggar River. Gopal Das provided assistance to the British in 1809 and during the Anglo-Nepalese War. Due to this, the British official David Ochterlony offered Pinjore to Gopal Das as a jagir (estate) but he preferred to obtain the raja title, which was then bestowed upon him.

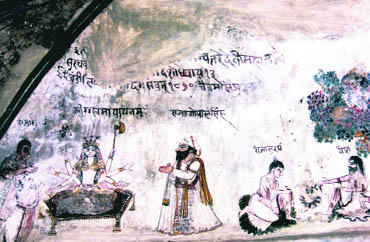
Fresco of Raja Gopal Das of Mani Majra State paying obeisance to the goddess Mahamaya from the Mansa Devi temple of Mani Majra. Painted by Angad of Sirmur, 1813.

The Mansa Devi temple was constructed in circa 1811 by Gopal Das. An interesting feature of the temple is that an underground tunnel was built to ensure that Gopal Das and his wife could visit the temple everyday, with the temple only opening for the general public after the royal couple had witnessed their daily darshan. A story related to this is that once Karam Singh of Patiala had to wait outside the doors of the temple until the Manimajra royals completed their daily darshan before he could be let-in, an event which apparently motivated him to construct his own Mansa Devi temple at Patiala in 1840. An artist named Angad, originally from Sirmur State, painted a mural of the Chandi form of Durga slaying the demon Mahishasura at Manimajra in the year 1813. According to traditional lore, Gopal Singh of Manimajra constructed a temple dedicated to the goddess Mansa in 1815 after the devi had apparently instructed him to-do so in a dream of his. Gopal Das died in 1816 and was succeeded by Hamir Singh, his son.

=== Under Hamir Singh ===
Hamir Singh only survived his predecessor for a few years. In circa 1818, Hamir Singh of Manimajra allowed the settlement of twelve Jat families originally from Nagla village and one Brahmin family into the Sukhna Choe area, leading to the founding of Hamirgarh village. Hamir Singh had two sons through Rani Chand Kaur, Govardhan Singh and Amar Singh. Hamir Singh was succeeded by his son Govardhan Singh.

=== Under Govardhan Singh and Gurbaksh Singh ===
In 1828, the rulers of the Cis-Sutlej states had an interview with the governor-general in Manimajra. It is unknown if it was either Lord Amherst or William Butterworth Bayley who was appointed as governor-general that year. During the rule of Govardhan Singh, Manimajra State supported the British side during the First Anglo-Sikh War, providing a detachment of troops that fought at the Battle of Mudki in 1845 and other battles of the war. The soldiers and retainers of Govardhan Singh were issued their uniform only on special occasions and they had to return them to the toshakhana (treasury) afterwards. Govardhan Singh died in 1847 and was succeeded by Gurbaksh Singh. Gurbaksh Singh died in 1866 and was succeeded as ruler by his younger brother, Bhagwan Singh.

=== Under Bhagwan Singh ===
Bhagwan Das was the last ruler of Manimajra State. Bhagwan Singh was 22-years-old when he came to the throne and inherited a jagir (estate) consisting of 77 villages that brought in a revenue of 38,453 rupees per annum. Bhagwan Das encouraged pioneers from the nearby village of Manaa to establish settlements and farms around the royal fort of the state as it was an uninhabited tract of land. Thus, around 70 families from Manaa village took the ruler up on this offer and settled the tracts of land around the fort. The locality established by these settlers would grow into an important locality, becoming the largest village of the region with an important market, attracting people from Ambala, Kalka, and Ropar.

Whilst Bhagwan Singh is officially credited as being the founder of the current structure of Manimajra Fort, the fort in-actuality likely existed in an earlier form, as it finds mention in travelogues written by William Moorcroft and George Trebeck during the decade of the 1820s. Between 21 April and 27 April 1872, 20 deaths were recorded in Manimajra locality.

The daughter of Raja Bhagwan Singh of Manimajra, Suraj Kaur, was married to Balbir Singh of Faridkot State. The wedding took place in Ambala district.

=== Dissolution ===
After the death of Bhagwan Singh, the lack of a male issue led to the annexation of the state by the British. The estate of Manimajra was absorbed in 1875 into the surrounding district. The ownership of Manimajra Fort passed onto the Faridkot royal family due to their marital relations.

== Religion ==
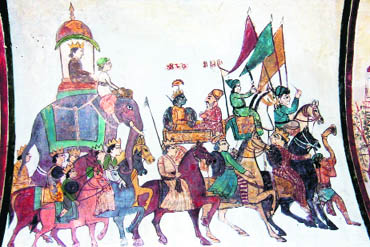
Fresco of a religious procession from the Mansa Devi temple of Mani Majra State

Manimajra State held territory that carries significance in the Sikh religion. Gurdwara Manji Sahib, also known as Mata Raj Kaur Gurdwara, is believed to have been the place of residence of Mata Raj Kaur, wife of Ram Rai (son of Guru Har Rai). According to legend, when Mata Raj Kaur was forced to leave the premises of the gurdwara, she said a curse that any person who builds a structure higher than the gurdwara at Manimajra would suffer. In-accordance with the legend of the curse, it is claimed that the Manimajra dynasty went extinct since at some point they built the Manimajra Fort higher than the gurdwara. Recently, local residents successfully petitioned to have the height of the local gurdwara increased.

== Legacy ==
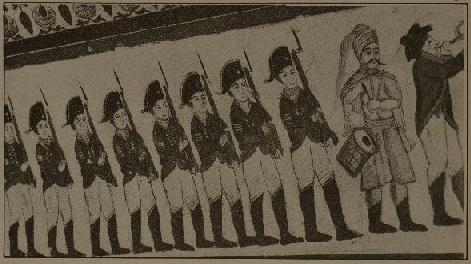
Fresco depicting a parade of Red Coats with musicians leading the infantry from Manimajra Fort

Manimajra locality later became a town under the jurisdiction of Ambala province in pre-partition Punjab. The later planned city of Chandigarh was developed from wastelands, villages, and agricultural fields that had once belonged to Manimajra State.

The Manimajra Fort (also known as Surajpur Fort) is currently in a dilapidated condition and the subject of a court dispute. The fort is currently private property that is off-grounds from the public and little is known of its architecture. However, what is visible from the outside reveals that the fort's walls was constructed using lines of Nanakshahi bricks. Whilst the Manimajra Fort has been accorded official status as a heritage structure, no preservation, restoration, or documentation work can be conducted on the fort since it is still under legal dispute.

Manimajra locality is now Chandigarh's IT Park. The area of Manimajra was officially renamed as Sector 13 in 2020, not all residents were happy with the name-change. Rapid urbanization is changing the landscape and culture of the former Manimajra area.

== List of rulers ==
- Gharib Das (r. January 1764–1783)
- Gopal Das (r. 1783–1816) (Note: Also known as 'Gopal Singh'.)
- Hamir Singh (r. 1816–?)
- Govardhan Singh (r. ? – 1847) (Note: Govardhan Singh's forename is alternatively spelt as 'Goverdhan'.)
- Gurbaksh Singh (r. 1847–1866)
- Bhagwan Das (r. 1866 – 1875) (Note: Also known as 'Bhagwan Singh'.)
