= Kaimbwala =

- Village in Chandigarh union territory
- Location within Chandigarh Location within India
- Coordinates: 30.7545°N 76.8224°E
- Country: India

Government
  - Type: Union territory Municipal corporation
  - Body: Municipal Corporation Chandigarh
  - Adviser to the Administrator: Dharam Pal
  - Member of Parliament: Manish Tewari, INC
  - Mayor: Saurabh Joshi, BJP
  - Municipal Councillor: Jaswinder Kaur, AAP

Area
  - Total: 364 ha (899 acres)

Population (2011)
  - Total: 6,050
- Demonym(s): Chandigarhwala, Chandigarhwale, Chandigarhian, Kaimbwalaala or Kaimbwalaale

Language
  - Official: English
  - Spoken: Punjabi, Hindi
- Time zone: UTC+5:30 (IST)
- Postal code: 160103
- Telephone code: +91 172
- ISO 3166 code: IN-CH
- Vehicle registration: CH-01 (Current), CH-02 (Commercial Vehicles & Taxis), PB-01(Taxis to Chandigarh)
- Literacy: 72.19%
- Website: chandigarh.gov.in

Kaimbwala is a Non Sectoral Village in Northern Periphery (now under local civic body Municipal Corporation Chandigarh) situated near foothills of the Shivaliks and Punjab & Haryana High Court in Chandigarh district in Chandigarh, India.

== History ==
The history of the settlement is rather vague. It is however learnt that about three to four centuries ago a family of Gujjars belonging to Bhainsi gotra established the settlement of Kaimbwala by clearing open forest of Kaimb trees, hence the acquired the name of Kaimbwala and Gujjar became the dominant caste of the Village. It is further believed that an ancestor of Bhainsi gotra was awarded a piece of land by the ruler of the State of Mani Majra for his loyalty to the king. With the passage of time, Gujjars belonging to the Hindu religion with sub-caste Kalas, Manne, Gore, Chechi, Mokar, Mogria, and Baharwal. Kataria, VANNA, VANNE (awana) and Poswal migrated and fused with the settlement. The process was facilitated by the matrimonial alliances between various Gujjar gotras, purchase of land, donation of land occupation by legal manipulation and allotment by the Government. Apart from the ethnic attraction, the migrants found habitation ideal for their cattle since the foothills provided desirable grazing land. The most prominent profession of the earlier settlers is said to be rearing goats and sheep.

It is believed that Kaimbwala was a part of the revenue estate of Kansal, in the 19th century. The village was detached from Kansal in 1852 by one Kale Rai, the then, widely acclaimed Consolidation Officer. The elders in the village could recall lineage up to five to six generations as such the settlement could be around three to four centuries old.

== Geography and ecology ==
=== Location ===
Kaimbwala is one of the 27 villages which form the rural ring around the city of Chandigarh. The village falls in the Mani Majra Patwar Circle and has Chandigarh for its tehsil and district headquarters. Before the reorganisation of the erstwhile Punjab State; on 1 November 1966, the village was a part of Kharar tehsil of Ambala district. It is located at a distance of 12 km from the district and tehsil headquarter. The village is situated on the periphery of Chandigarh and is connected by a kachas as well as a pucca metalled road. One can reach the village by either of the road and can be reached by bus by a rather circuitous route from the hub of Chandigarh city viz; Bus Stand at Sector 17, via Punjab Engineering College (U.T., Chandigarh), Nayagaon (Punjab), Khuda Ali-sher (U.T., Chandigarh) and Kansal (Punjab). This is the normal bus route on a metalled road and the distance to be traversed is about 12 km from the Bus Stand in Sector 17 of Chandigarh. The pedestrians, cyclists and scooterists etc., however, prefer a shorter route connecting the village to Sector 4 of Chandigarh by a minor road measuring 3 km. This road through metalled has a width of 11 metres and can thus be used by two-wheelers only.

Chandigarh City and Mani Majra Town are the main administrative, educational, commercial and cultural centres for the inhabitants of the Kaimbwala village. The entire village depends for most of their needs on these centres. The marketing centre of the inhabitants is however Mani Majra, which can be reached by a Kacha road by crossing over the dried up river bed of Sukhna rivulet and Suketri village situation in Haryana State. Mani Majra, a satellite town of Chandigarh Union Territory is located at a distance of 6 km. from the Village. The inhabitants of the village predominantly frequent two markets viz. Mani Majra town and the Grain market adjoining Sector 26 of Chandigarh city. Cloth, utensils, ornaments and sundry, groceries are purchased from Mani Majra while cattle feed like Khal (oilseed cakes) and Varaiwan (cotton seeds) are purchased from the grain market. In view of the traditional contact of the villagers with the traders of Mani Majra, goods can be obtained in this market on credit. This facility, however, is not available in the grain market. The mode of travel is on foot or by bicycle and the popular routes are the minor road connecting the village to Sector 4 of Chandigarh and the one connecting the village to Mani Majra. The metalled road passing through Punjab Engineering College, Khuda Ali-sher and Kansal villages is not so popular. Only one bus traverses to this village from Chandigarh Bus Stand. This route is hardly used by cyclists/scooterists. The village has three shops which can barely cater to the needs of rural consumers. These generally sell Karyana though one of these also sells Khal and Choker (husk).

The land has a mild downward gradient towards the south, levelling off at the Sukhna rivulet. The gradient slopes downwards towards the north but changes sharply, inclining upwards, as one approaches the Shivalik range of the Himalayas. To the West and South, a dense forest is building up as a result of the afforestation drive taken up by the Government to forestall silting of the lake which had of late, become a major menace. The terrain of the village is undulating and interspersed with rocky and sandy land. This area holds promises of gay times for hikers and picnickers from Chandigarh.

=== Climate ===
Chandigarh has almost a typically north Indian extreme climate with occasional dust storms during the peak of summers. On the basis of climate, the year can be divided into three seasons: the summer season from April to June, the rainy season from July to September and the winter season from October to March. The average temperature may rise to as high as 40 °C in the summer while it touches as low as 3 °C in the winter. The rainy season provides great relief from the discomforts of the summer. A large part of the annual rainfall is received from July to September. The other period of annual rainfall is in the winter months from December to March which is scanty. There is little or negligible rainfall during the four months of April, May, October and November. The summer rainfall which is caused by the south western monsoon is beneficial for Kharif crops. The winter rainfall caused by the western depression lasts from December to March which is significant for Rabi crops. Kaimbwala village being quite adjacent to Chandigarh, the data collected for Chandigarh holds good for the village. January and June are the two months recording the lowest and highest temperature respectively. With the onset of monsoons in July, the temperature starts declining. July, August and September are recorded as the most humid months.

=== Flora and Fauna ===
The hinterland of the village abounds in a variety of flora and fauna. Kikar, Barota, Pipal, Shisham and Neem are the common trees found here. Mango trees are found closer to the habitation in the field and in the courtyards. Wild aak is used for fencing the fields. Sarkanda (wild grass) is a common sight in the tracts not fit for cultivation.

Jackal, hare, wild bear, and wild cats are found in great numbers around the village. Parrots, sparrows, pigeons, crows, doves, and nightingales are common birds. Cuckoos arrive in Baisakh (April) and depart in Asvina (September). Partridges and quails are seen in the winter months. Snakes of different colours and varieties, species appear mostly in the rainy season and quite a few cases of snakebite have been reported.

== Demographics ==
=== Population ===
The total geographical area of the village is 899 acres. Kaimbwala has a total population of 6,050 people, out of which the male population is 3,357 while the female population is 2,693 as per Population Census 2011. There are about 1,341 households in the village and an average of 4 persons live in every family.

As per the Population Census 2011 data

	Total	Men	Female
Population	6050	3357	2693
Children	1019	549	470
Scheduled Caste	1605	871	734
Scheduled Tribe	0	0	0
Illiterate	2418	1087	1331

The village has a substantial population of Schedule Caste. Schedule Caste (SC) constitutes 26.53% of the total population in Kaimbwala village. The village Kaimbwala currently does not have any Schedule Tribe (ST) population.

=== Sex Ratio ===
The total population of Kaimbwala is 6,050 out of which 3,357 are males and 2,693 are females thus the Average Sex Ratio of Kaimbwala is 802.

The population of children of age 0–6 years in Kaimbwala village is 1019 which is 17% of the total population. There are 549 male children and 470 female children between the ages of 0–6 years. Thus as per the Census 2011, the Child Sex Ratio of Kaimbwala is 856 which is greater than the Average Sex Ratio (802) of Kaimbwala village.

=== Literacy ===
As per the Census 2011, the literacy rate of Kaimbwala is 72.2%. Thus Kaimbwala village has a lower literacy rate compared to 76.3% of the Chandigarh district. The male literacy rate is 80.84% and the female literacy rate is 61.27% in Kaimbwala village.

	Total	Male	Female
Literacy	72.19%	80.84%	61.47%

=== Workers Profile ===
Out of the total population, 2,379 were engaged in work activities. 95.7% of workers describe their work as Main Work (Employment or Earning more than 6 Months) while 4.3% were involved in Marginal activity providing a livelihood for less than 6 months. Of 2,379 workers engaged in Main Work, 82 were cultivators (owner or co-owner) while 19 were Agricultural labourers.

	Total	Male	Female
Main Workers	2276	1812	464
Cultivators	82	77	5
Agricultural Laborer	19	18	1
Household Industries	32	17	15
Other Workers	2143	1700	443
Marginal Workers	103	53	50
Non-Working	3671	1492	2179

== See also ==
- Sukhna Lake
- Rock Garden
- Sukhna Wildlife Sanctuary
