= Gurdwara Khooni Sahib =

Historical and holy place in India

Coordinates: 30°43′10″N 76°50′54″E

Sri Khooni Sahib is a gurudwara in Manimajra, a small town in Chandigarh, India. The gurdwara is located about one kilometer from the Mata Mansa Devi Temple, a Hindu temple. It is located in Manimajra village Bhansa Tibba.

== History ==
Guru Gobind Singh Ji came to Sri Khooni Sahib from Narayanpur in 1746 (Vikram Samvat) at the request of Anpoorna, a Brahmin girl who worshiped Guru Sahib. Guru Gobind Singh Ji meditated here for 17 hours. While staying here, Anpoorna served food to Guru Sahib and the people who came with him. Seeing this, Guru Sahib blessed him that a temple will be built in his name in front of the gurdwara and whoever comes here with true devotion, his wishes will be fulfilled.
