= Manimajra Fort =

Fort situated in Mani Majra town of Chandigarh city

- Chandigarh, India
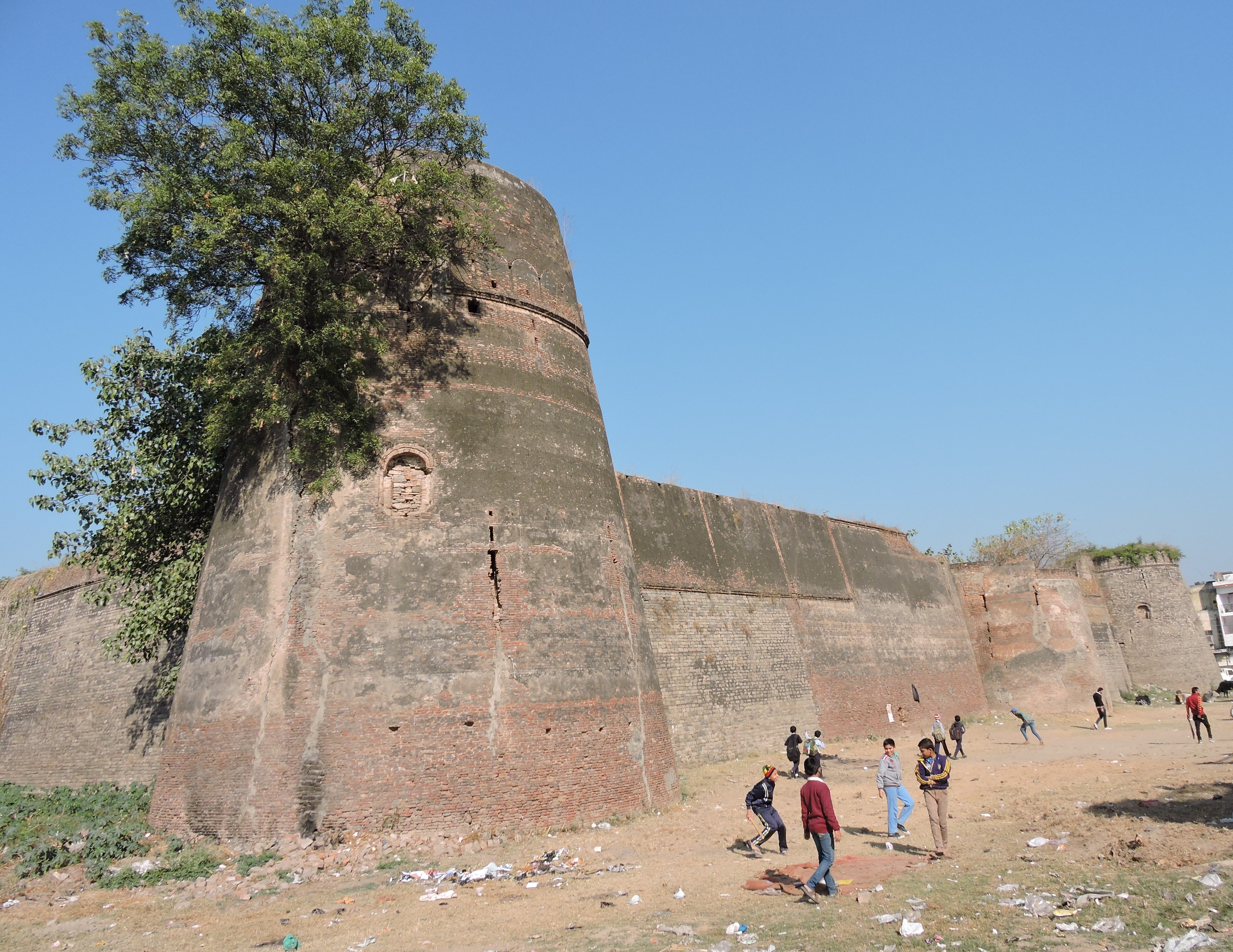
- Manimajra Fort, East side view

Site information
- Type: Fort
- Controlled by: Meharwal Khewaji Trust
- Open to the public: No
- Condition: Deteriorating

Location
- India
- Location within Punjab
- Coordinates: 30°42′52″N 76°50′14″E

Site history
- Built by: Ghareeb Das Dhillon
- Materials: Nanak Shahi bricks

Manimajra Fort is a fort situated in Mani Majra, Chandigarh (city of Indian Union). It is over 360 years old and has become more popular with the shooting of the Oscar-winning movie Zero Dark Thirty. It was built by Gharib Dass Dhillon of Dhillon clan as the capital of his newly created state of 84 villages.

== History ==
The fort was built by Gharib Dass Dhillon (also spelled Gareeb Das) of Dhillon clan as the capital of his newly created state of 84 villages. Gharib Dass submitted to Patiala State. Dhillons of Manimajra later also occupied Sailba, 28 km northwest of Manimajra and now in SAS Nagar district, and Gurbakhsh Singh Dhillon was appointed kiladar (governor) of the Sailba fort.

As per Mahan Kosh, popularly known as Encyclopedia of Sikhism, Mani Majra was a town of (then) Ambala district of Punjab Province, which was conquered in 1821 by a local zamindar Ghareeb Dass along with 84 other villages and turned into the capital of his newly created State. The State was last ruled by Bhagwan Singh Dhillon of the clan of Ghareeb Dass Dhillon. As Bhagwan Singh Dhillon was childless, the Government took control of the property of this fort.

== Ownership ==
Presently the property was owned by Meharwal Khewaji Trust along with other related properties. The ownership of this property was controversial, and the case was under trial in the court. After a court-case, the ownership of the fort was given to the heirs of the last raja of Faridkot, Rajkumari Amrit Kaur and Deepinder Kaur, and Rani Mohender Kaur.

== Present condition ==
The present condition of the fort is not good and it is deteriorating day by day. The premises is being used as a playground or for parking vehicles by people living in the adjoining area. The walls are decaying and weed growth is visible on the walls.

== Gallery ==
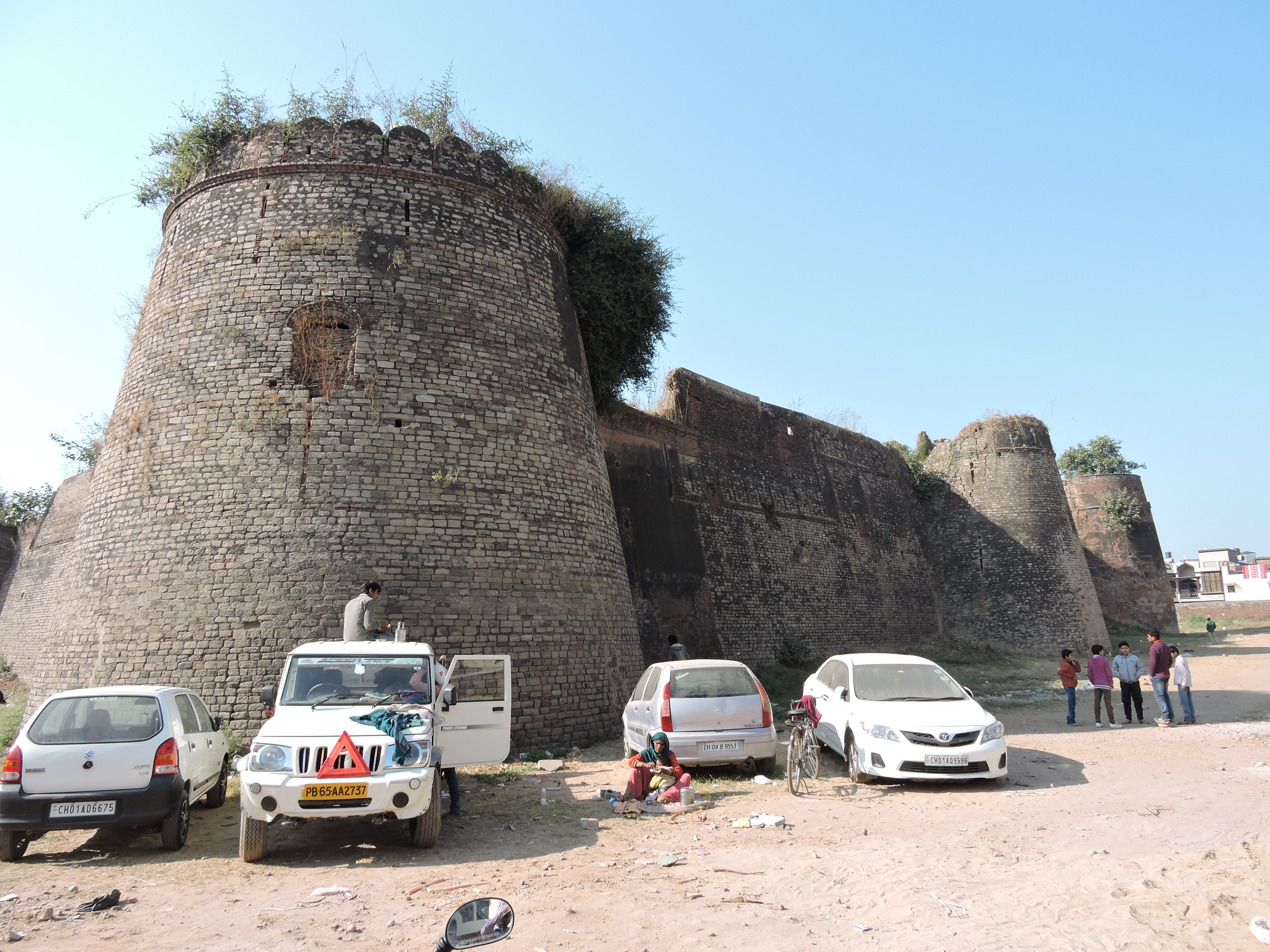
Northeast side view

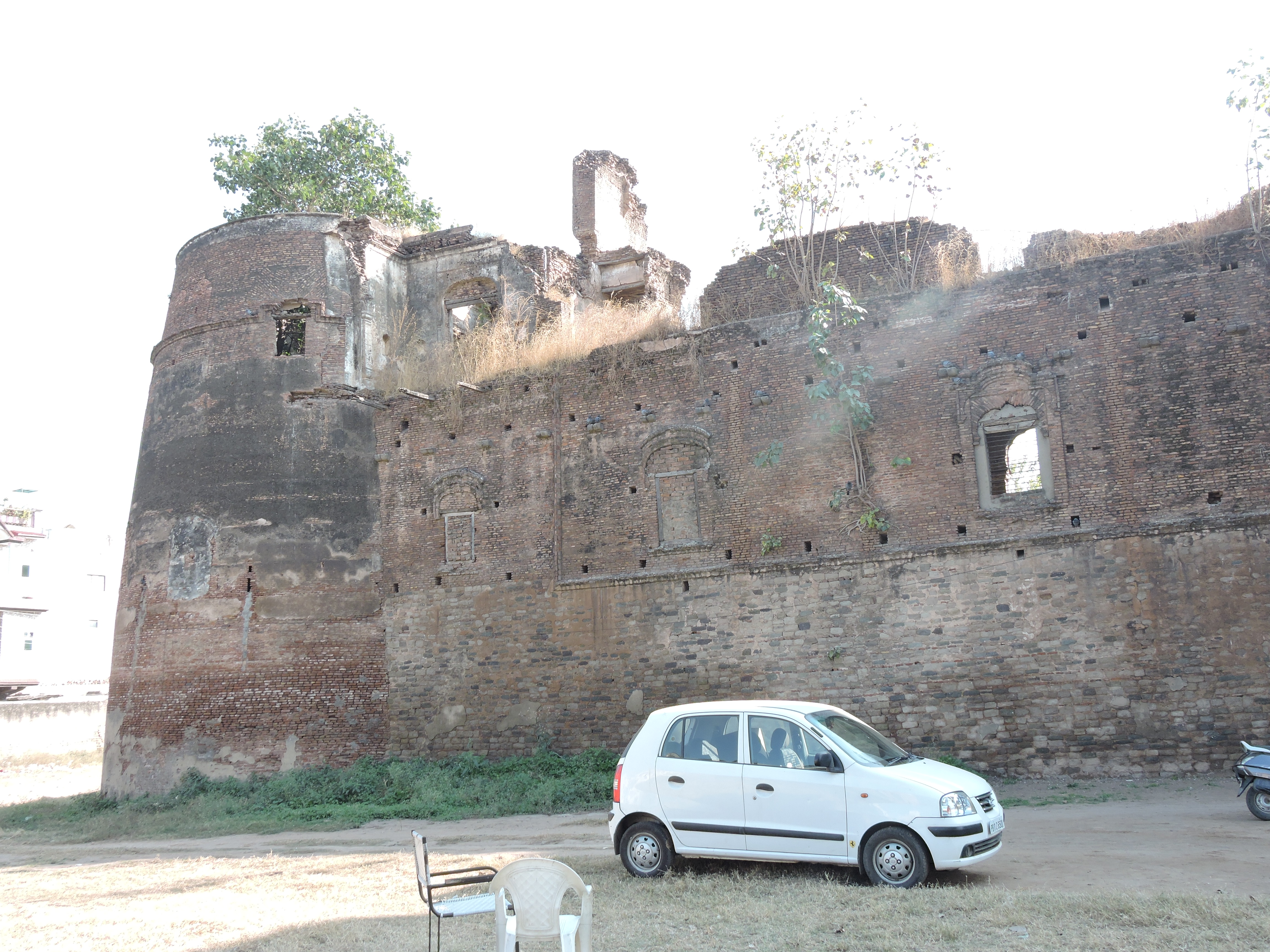
West side view

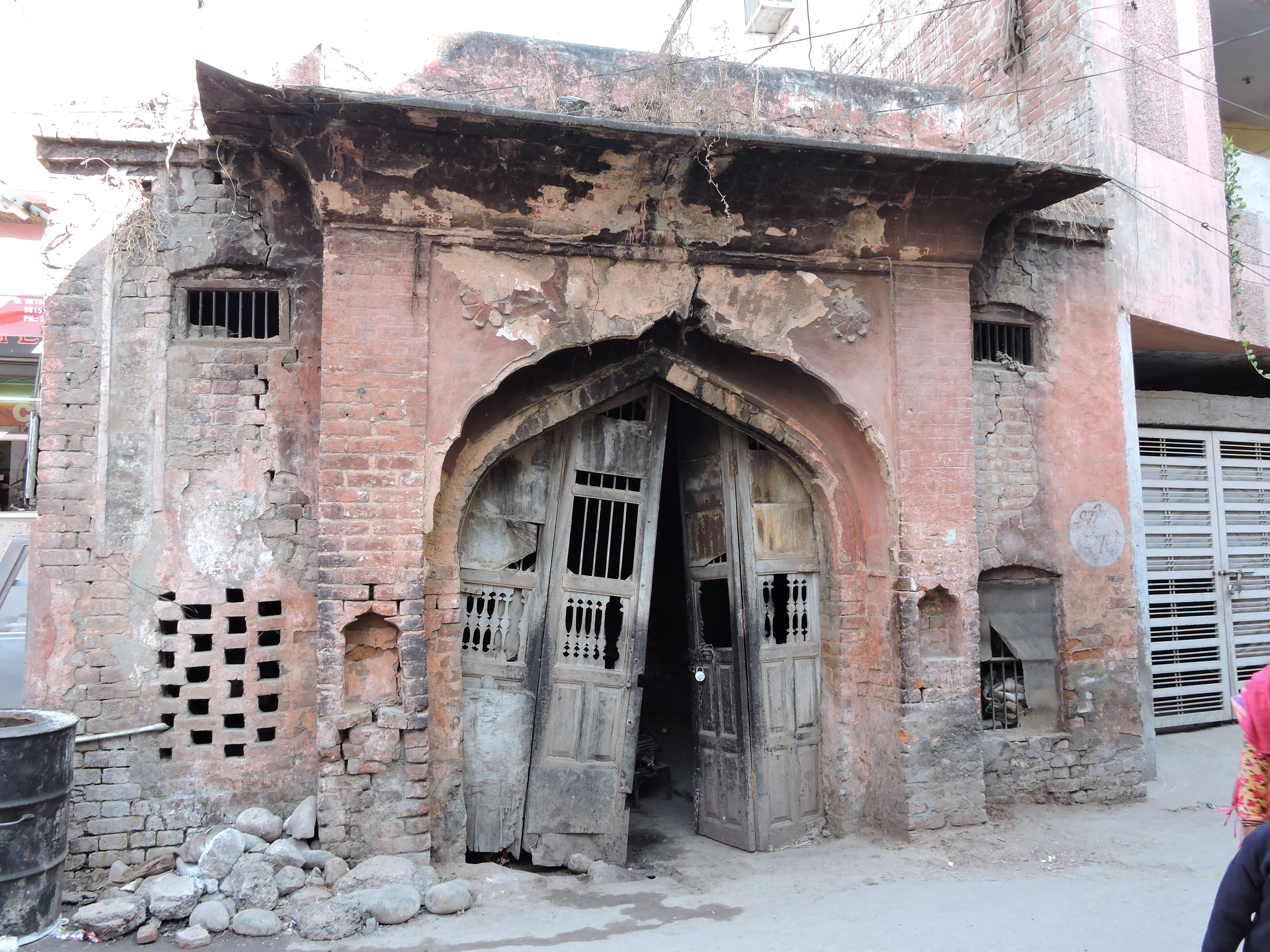
Deteriorating building of fort

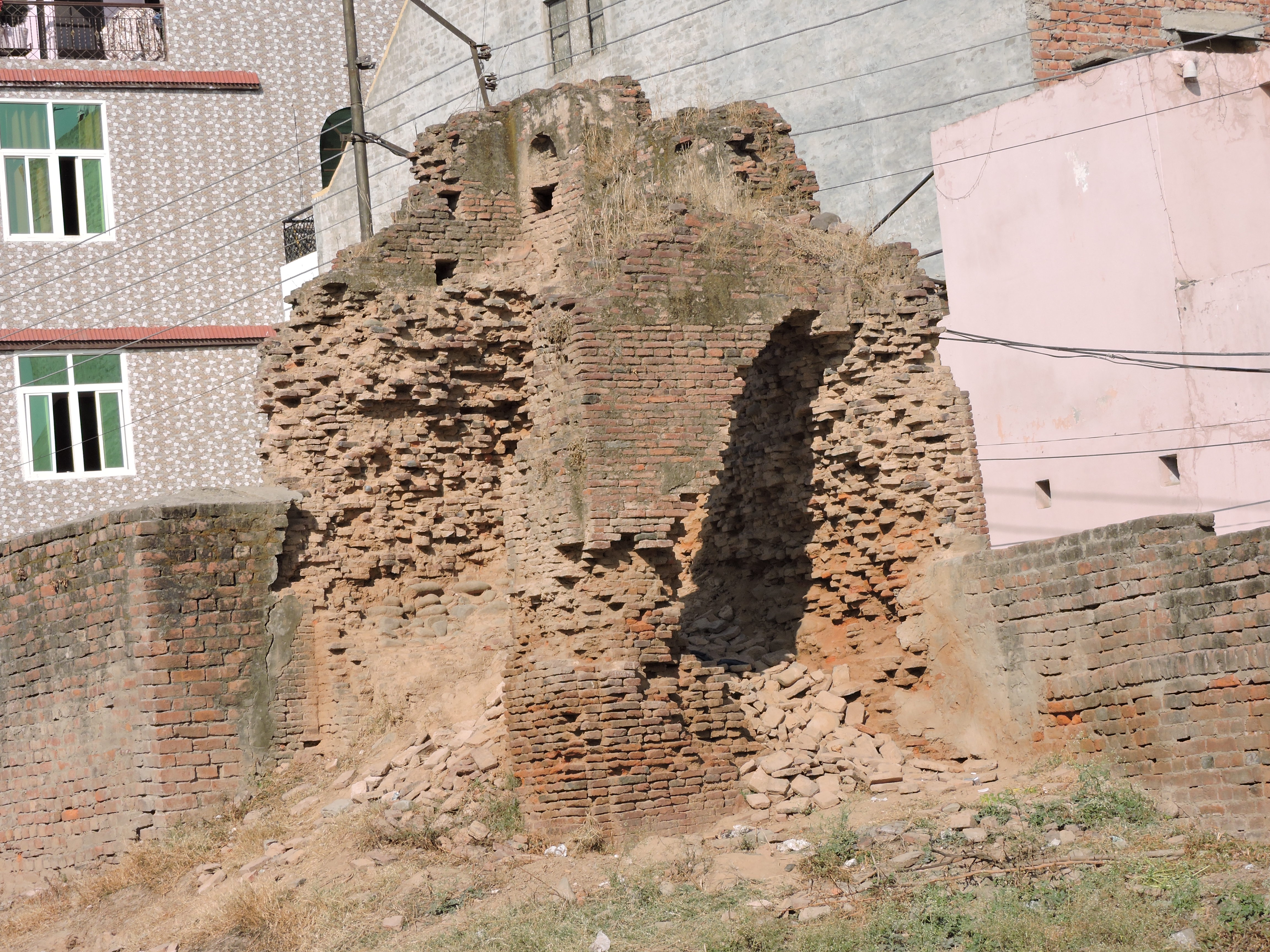
Ruins of courtyard
