= Mata Mansa Devi Mandir =

Hindu temple in Haryana, India

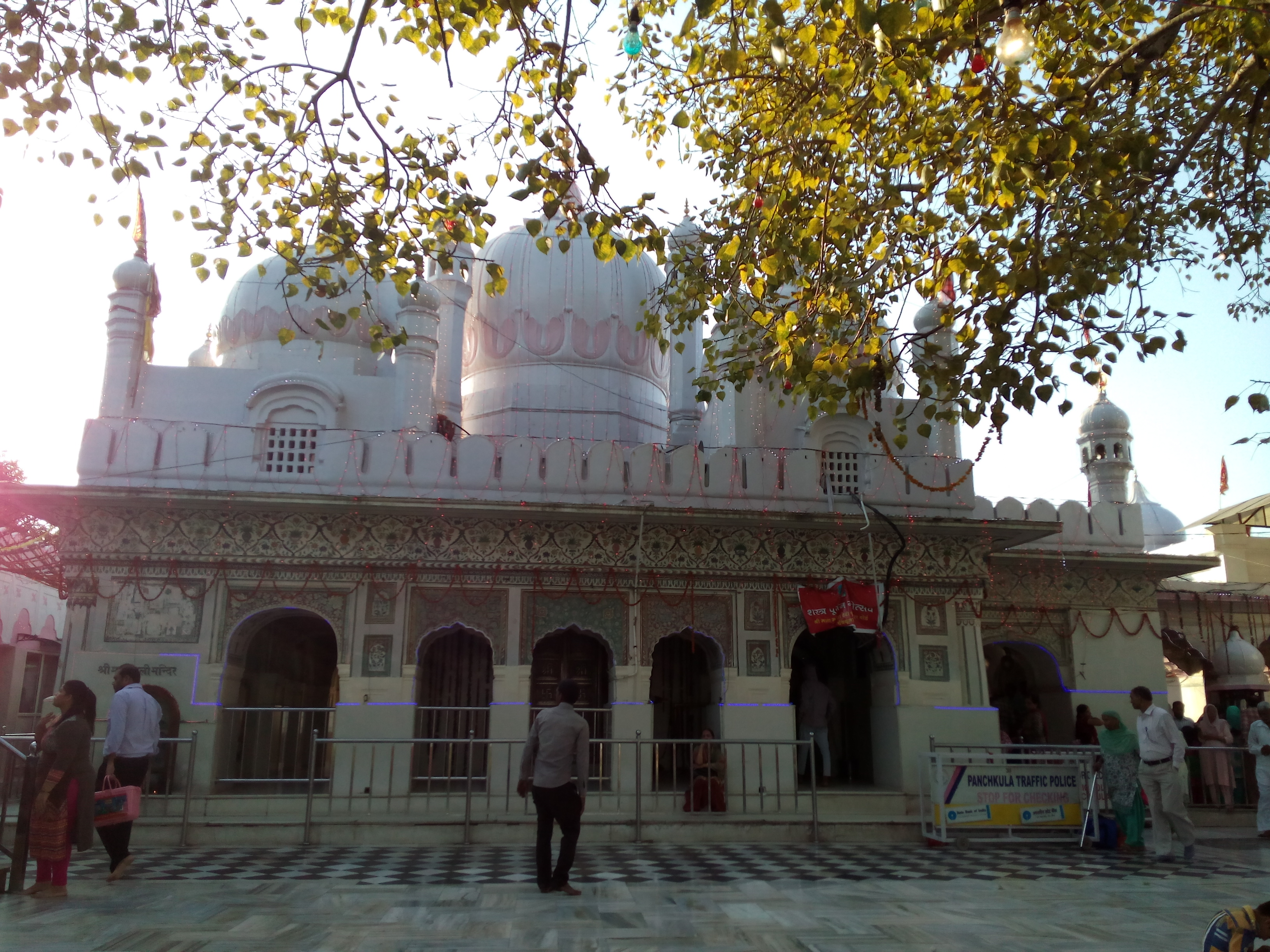
- Main shrine of the temple

- Location in Haryana Mata Mansa Devi Mandir (India)

Religion
- Affiliation: Hinduism
- District: Panchkula
- Deity: Manasa Devi
- Festival: Navratri
- Governing body: Shri Mata Mansa Devi Shrine Board

Location
- Location: Mansa Devi Complex, MDC Sector 4, Panchkula, Haryana 134114
- State: Haryana
- Country: India
- Coordinates: 30°45′55″N 76°49′37″E

Architecture
- Type: Hindu temple architecture
- Creator: Maharaja Gopal Singh of Mani Majra
- Completed: 1811–1815 A.D.

Mata Mansa Devi is a Hindu temple dedicated to goddess Mansa Devi, a form of Shakti, in the Panchkula district of the Indian state of Haryana. The temple complex is spread of 100 acres (0.40 km^{2}) of the Shivalik foothills in the village of Bilaspur, near Mani Majra of Chandigarh, and Panchkula, 10 km from Chandi Mandir, another noted Devi shrine in the region, both just outside Chandigarh.

== History ==
=== Construction of temples ===
There are 3 temples in the complex and the main temple is the oldest. Maharaja Gopal Das Singh of Mani Majra, who was enthroned in 1783, constructed the present main temple of Shri Mansa Devi, which is situated on the Shivalik foothills in the village Bilaspur, Tehsil and District Panchkula, during the period 1811–1815. At a distance of 200 meters from the main temple is the Patiala Shivalaya temple which was constructed by Karam Singh, a Jat Sikh, the then Maharaja of Patiala in the year 1840. This temple had the patronage of Manimajra Princely State.

=== Neglect after independence of India ===
After the merger of Princely states into PEPSU the Patronage of State Govt. ended and the temples remained neglected. The Raja of Manimajra then appointed pujari as ‘khidmatuzar’ to serve this temple whose duty was to worship the deity of the temple.

After the merger of princely State into PEPSU these pujaris became independent in the matter of controlling and managing the affairs of the temple and the land attached to the temple. They could neither maintain this temple nor provide necessary facilities to the visiting devotees and thus the condition of the temple deteriorated day by day.

=== Formation of Shri Mata Mansa Devi Shrine Board (SMMDSB) ===
As a result of the neglect, the Government of Haryana took over the temple and set up the "Shri Mata Mansa Devi Shrine Board (SMMDSB) Panchkula" trust to manage the temple. The Government of Haryana by an enactment (Haryana Act No. 14 of 1991) christened as "Shri Mata Mansa Devi Shrine Act (1991)" took over the control of this temple to provide for better infrastructure development, management, administration and governance of Shri Mata Mansa Devi Shrine and its endowments including lands and buildings attached to the Shrine. A Shrine Board with Chief Minister of Haryana as chairman was constituted for running of the Temple and preserving the heritage of the region.

SMMDSB also manages the Chandi Mandir after which both the Chandigarh city and Chandimandir Cantonment are named.

=== Conservation and enhancements ===
It was reported in 2021 that the Government of India has allocated INR 25cr (US3.3 million), under the PRASAD scheme, to Mata Mansa Devi Shrine Board for the upgrade of facilities in and around Mata Mansa Devi temple. New temple corridor was complete in 2021 and old stones were replaced by granite. And the main entrance gate will be renovated too. In 2021, temple receives between 2000 and 3000 devotees every day and there is fixed price list for the religious services.

== Temple complex ==
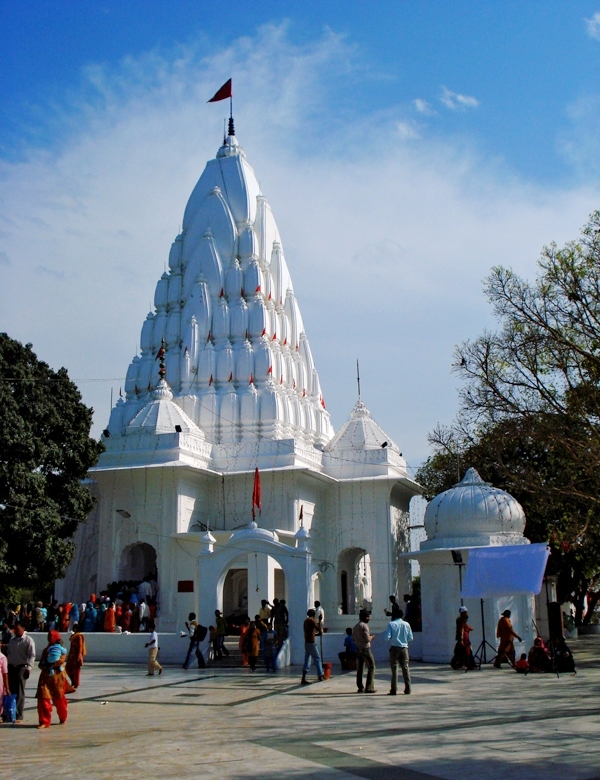
The Patiala temple, within the Mansa Devi temple complex, Panchkula, built-in 1840 AD.

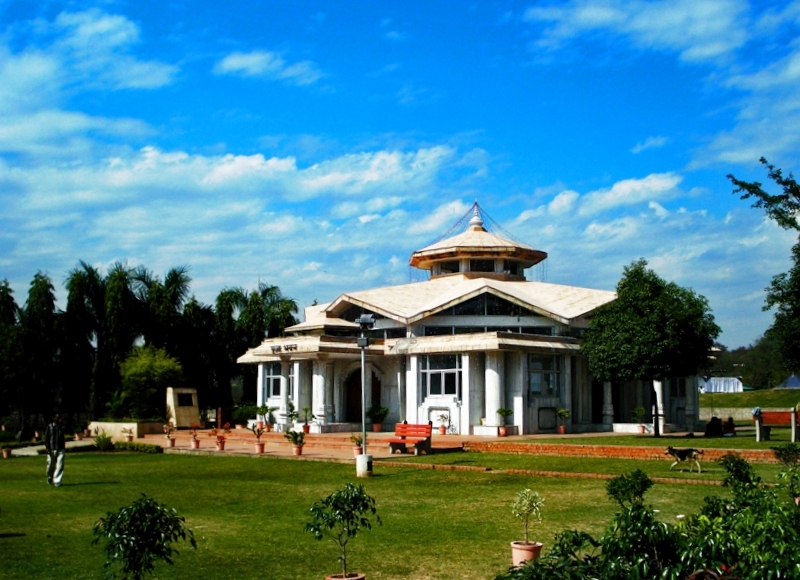
Yagya Shala, within the Mansa Devi temple complex.

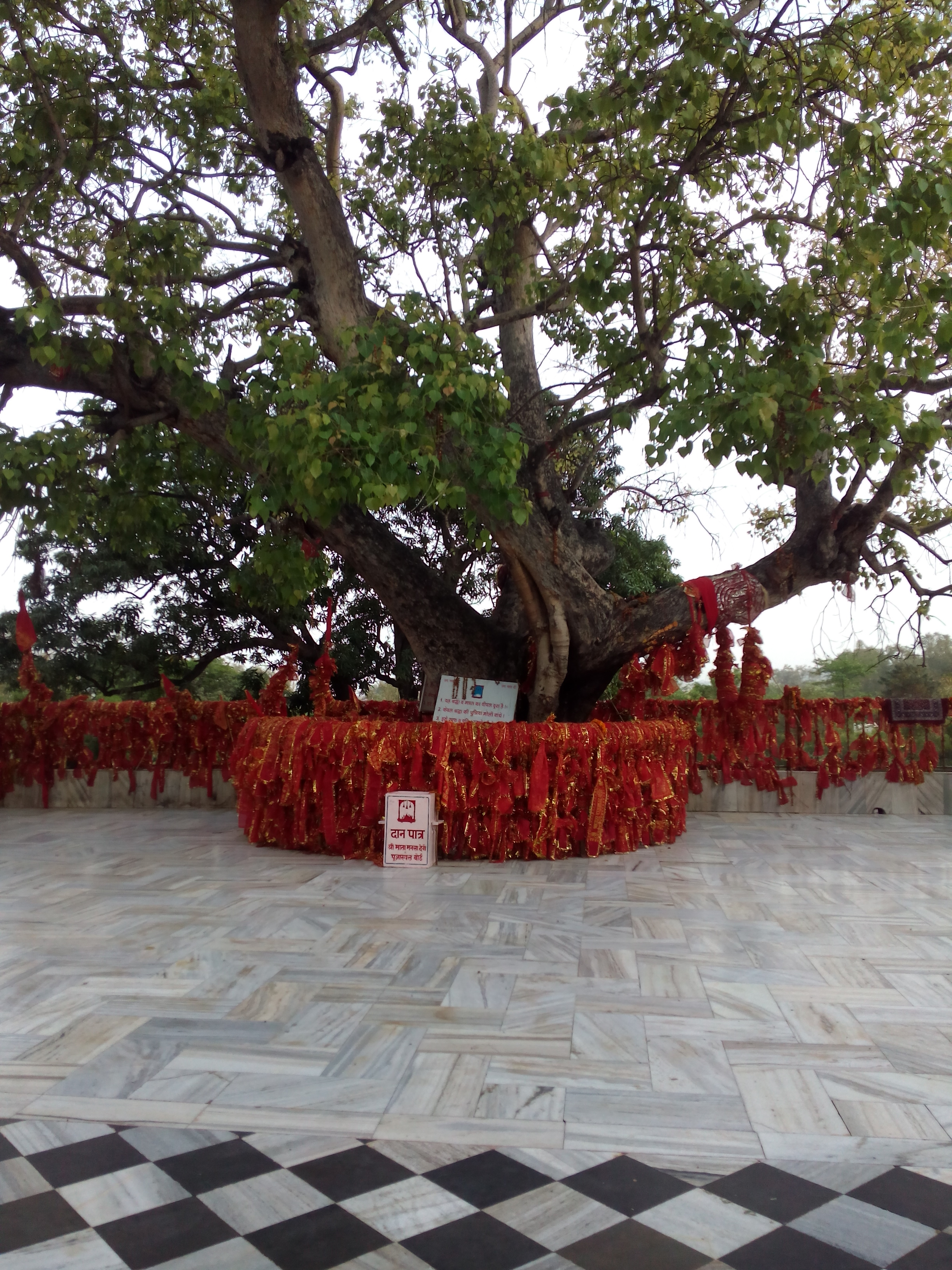
A peepal tree, the sacred tree in Hinduism, at the temple.

=== Three temples and architecture ===
There are 3 temples in the complex, main temple of Shri Mansa Devi built during 1811–1815 by Maharaja Gopal Das Singh of Mani Majra is oldest, Patiala Shivalaya temple constructed in 1840 by Patiala's Maharaja Karam Singh is at a distance of 200 m from the main temple of Shri Mansa Devi. In the Shiva temple, there are 38 panels of wall paintings as well as floral designs painted on the ceiling and arches leading to the temple, which according to an inscription were painted by Aged in Vikram Samvat 1870 (813 CE).

=== Festivals: Navratra mela ===
Navratra festival is celebrated in the mandir for nine days. Twice a year millions of devotees visit the temple. Shardiya Navratra Mela is organized at the shrine complex during Chaitra and Ashvin months. Every year two Navratra melas are organized in the month of Ashvin (Shardiya, Sharad or Winter Navratra) and others in the month of Chaitra, Spring Navratra by the Shrine Board.

Lakhs of devotees pay obeisance during the Navratra Mela held in Ashvin and Chaitra and temples remain open throughout the day. This melas are of nine days duration each time and concludes on the ninth day. The shrine Board makes elaborate arrangements for the comfortable stay and darshan of the devotees. The board makes arrangements for the provision of Chhowldari, tented accommodation, durries, blankets, temporary toilets, temporary dispensaries, mela police posts, and lines.

During the mela, Duty Magistrates and Nodal Officers are appointed to look after the devotees and smooth conduct of the mela. On the seventh and eighth day of Navratras, the temples of the Shrine Complex are closed only for two hours during the night for cleaning maintenance of the temples. For the rest of Navratras, the temples remain open for darshan from 05:00 to 22:00.

=== Transport ===
Located at a distance of about 10 km from the Chandigarh bus terminus and 4 km from the Panchkula bus terminus, the Mansa Devi temple can be reached by local buses. If traveling by train, Chandigarh is the nearest railhead for those heading to Mata Mansa Devi. It is situated on the Chandigarh–Kalka rail line.

- Nearest railhead: Chandigarh
- Nearest airport: Chandigarh

=== Institutes within temple complex ===
The temple management, in conjunction with various govt entities, is undertaking construction of the following at the land belonging to the temple on this site:

- Mata Mansa Devi Sanskrit College, Panchkula: Its construction will commence soon on 2.10 acre land.
- Mata Mansa Old Age Home, Panchkula: Five story building is under construction in 2021 July at a cost of ₹10.48 crore will be completed by 15 January 2022.
- National Institute of Ayurveda, Panchkula: Is being constructed by the Union Ministry of AYUSH at 19.87 acre land, and there will be a ₹2.2 crore disgnostic centre as well. It will have 59766.79 sqm constructed area 59766.79 entailing hospital building, college and administration building, student hostels, international students hostel, academic block, guest house, residential houses for the staff, director's bungalow, boundary wall & entry gates with security guard's cabins, auditorium, utilities such as electric sub station, water tanks with pump room, 325 KLD STP/ETP, etc. Site is in Seismic Zone IV. Sukhna Wild Life Sanctuary is 6.2 km and Sukhna Lake is 3.5 km northwest, Chandi Mandir Cantonment is 0.65 km.

== Other Mansa Devi temples ==
- Mansa Devi Temple, Haridwar
- Shri Mansa Mata Mandir Hasampur

== See also ==
- Hindu pilgrimage
- List of Hindu temples
- Haryana Tourism
