= Chandi Mandir =

Hindu temple in Chandigarh, India

- चंडी मंदिर
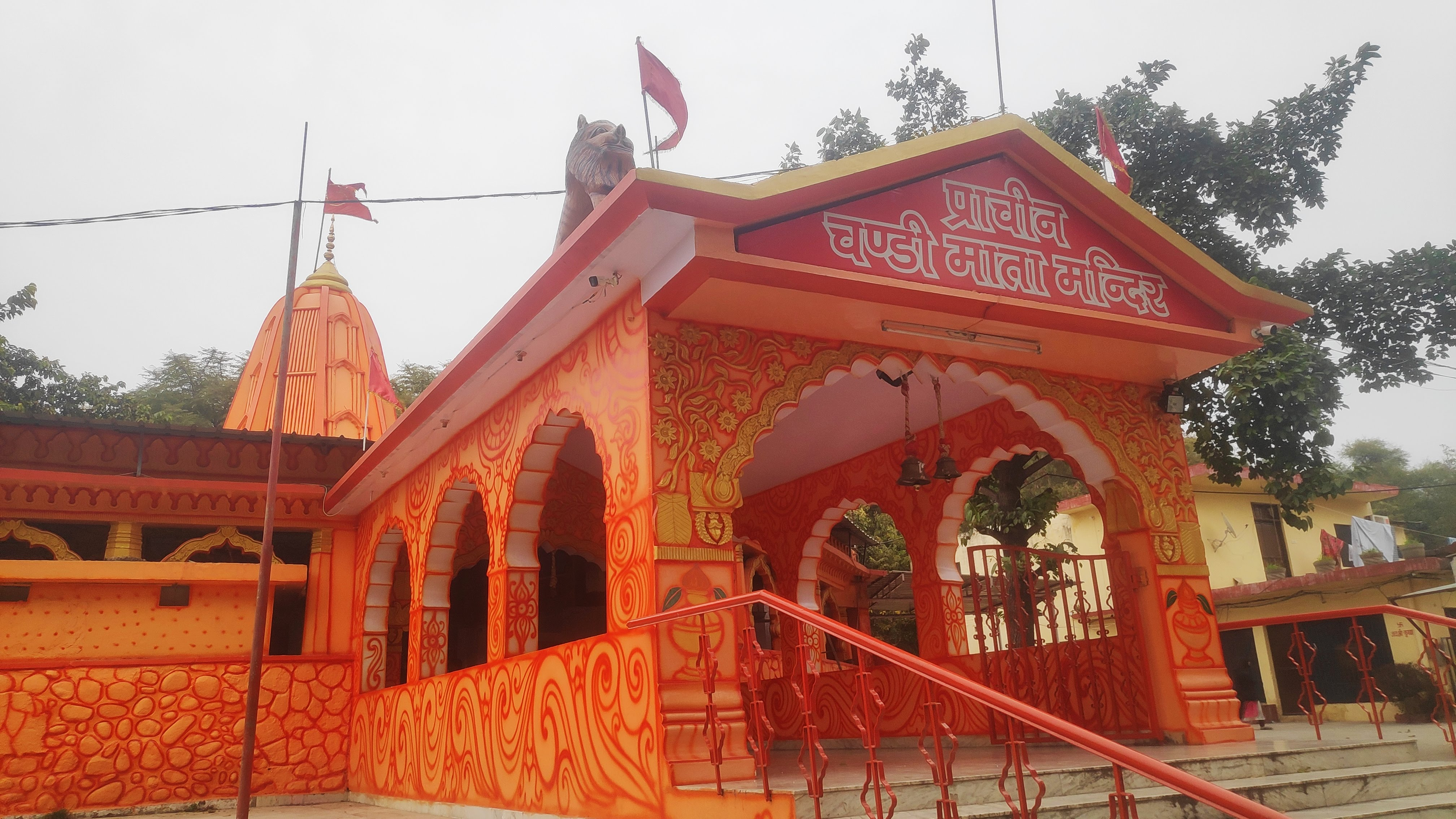
- The front gate of Chandi Mandir which lies within Chandimandir Cantonment

Religion
- Affiliation: Hinduism
- District: Panchkula district
- Deity: Chandi Devi
- Festivals: Navratras, Durga Puja
- Status: Functional

Location
- Location: Chandimandir Cantonment on NH-5
- State: Haryana
- Country: India
- Interactive map of Chandi Mandir
- Coordinates: 30°44′40″N 76°54′02″E

Architecture
- Style: Nagara Hindu temple architecture

Website
- Official website

Chandi Mandir (Hindi, Mandir: "Temple") is a Hindu temple dedicated to Chandi the goddess of power, near Chandigarh, located on NH-5 Chandigarh-Kalka highway in Panchkula city of Haryana state of India. It is about 15 km from the city of Chandigarh, which was named after the temple, and about 10 km away from the Mansa Devi Shrine. The temple is situated amidst beautiful surroundings and the backdrop of the Shivalik hills.

== Location ==
Chandi Mandir lies in the Chandimandir Cantonment which is home of Western Command of the Indian army.

== Temple ==
The Chandi Mandir is managed by the Shri Mata Mansa Devi Shrine Board. The temple has statues of various Hindu deities including Chandi, Radha Krishna, Hanuman, Shiva and Ram.

== Festivals ==
During the festival of Durga Puja during Navratras, thousands of people visit this temple.

== Other Chandi temples in India ==
Other popular Chandi Devi temples in India are:

- Katak Chandi Temple, Cuttack in Odisha state
- Chandi Devi Temple, Haridwar in Uttrakhand state

== See also ==
- Religious tourism
- Saktism
- Yatra
