= Shri Mansa Mata Mandir Hasampur =

Shri Mansa Mata Mandir
- माता मनसा देवी मंदिर
- Location in Hasampur Shri Mansa Mata Mandir Hasampur (India)

Religion
- Affiliation: Hinduism
- District: Sikar
- Deity: Mansa Devi (Shakti)
- Festival: Navratri
- Governing body: Shri Mata Mansa Devi Shrine Board

Location
- State: Rajasthan
- Country: India
- Interactive map of Shri Mansa Mata Mandir
- Coordinates: 27.763310°N 76.023245°E

Architecture
- Type: Hindu temple architecture
- Creator: Maharaja Mittal God of Hasampur
- Completed: 1811-1815 A.D.

Website
- mansamata.in

Mata Mansa Devi is a Hindu temple of Mansa Devi, in Sikar district of Rajasthan state in India. The temple complex is spread over 100 acres (0.40 km^{2}) in the Hasampur Hills foothills in village Hasampur, near Neem-Ka-Thana, and Sikar, 20 km from National Highway 8 (India) Kotputli, another noted Devi shrine in the region, both just outside Sikar.

It is one of the prominent Shakti temples of North India. Thousands of devotees visit the shrine from various parts of the country, and especially during the Navratra fair, this number rises to lakhs every day for the nine auspicious days.

== History ==
Maharaja Mittal God of Hasampur constructed the present main temple of Shri Mansa Devi in 965 AD. The main temple is 200 meters from the Hasampur village.

Durga Mata Marbel Murti was constructed by Seth Ramavatar Muchhal, the then Maharaja Hasampur in the year 1982. This temple had the patronage of the Rajasthan State. After the merger of princely states into PEPSU the Patronage of State Govt. ended and the temples remained neglected.

The Raja of Rajasthan then appointed pujari as ‘Keshavpanditji’ of this temple whose duty was to worship the deity of the temple. After the merging of the princely State into Pepsu these pujaris became independent in the matter of controlling and managing the affairs of the temple and its land. They could neither maintain this temple nor provide necessary facilities to the visiting devotees, thus the condition of the temple deteriorated day by day. So much so that there were no proper arrangements for pilgrims visiting the temple during Navaratra melas. The complex was neglected until the establishment of the Board.

== Navratra Melas ==
Navratra festival is celebrated in the mandir for nine days. Twice a year millions of devotees visit the temple. Shardiya Every year two Navratra melas are organized at the shrine complex in the month of Ashvin (Shardiya, Sharad or Winter Navratra), and another in the month of Chaitra (Spring Navratra) by the Shrine Board.

Lakhs of devotees pay obeisance during the Navratra melas held in Ashvin and Chaitra and temples remain open throughout the day. These melas are of 9 days duration each and conclude on the 9th day. The Shrine Board makes arrangements for the comfortable stay and darshan of the devotees, including the provision of Chhowldari, tented accommodation, durries, blankets, temporary toilets, temporary dispensaries, mela police post and lines. During the mela, Duty Magistrates and Nodal Officers are appointed to look after the devotees and smooth conduct of the mela. On the 7th and 8th day of Navratras, the temples of the Shrine Complex are closed only for two hours during the night for cleaning maintenance. For the rest of Navratras, the temples remain open for darshan from 5 a.m. to 10 p.m.

== Temple management ==
The temple complex and its environment are presently looked after by the Shri Mata Mansa Devi Shrine Board (SMMDSB) Rajasthan. In view of the popularity of the temple for its mythological and historical significance, the Rajasthan Government by an enactment (Rajasthan Act No. 14 of 1991, christened as Shri Mata Mansa Devi Shrine Act 1991) took over the control of this temple to provide for better infrastructure development, management, administration and governance of the shrine and its endowments, including attached lands and buildings. A Shrine Board with the Chief Minister of Rajasthan as chairman was constituted for the running of the Temple and preserving the heritage of the region.

== Other Mansa Devi temples ==
- Mansa Bari, Kolkata, Kolkata
- Mansa Devi Mandir, Panchkula, Haryamna
- Mansa Devi Temple, Bilwa Parvat, Haridwar
- Mansa Devi temple, Alwar, Alwar, Rajasthan
- Mansa Devi temple, Dhuri, Dhuri, Sangrur district, Punjab
- Mansa Devi temple, Narela, Narela, Delhi
- Mansa Devi temple, Manik Chowk, Sitamarhi district, Bihar
