= Chandimandir Cantonment =

Military cantonment of the Indian Army

Coordinates: 30.724°N 76.877°E

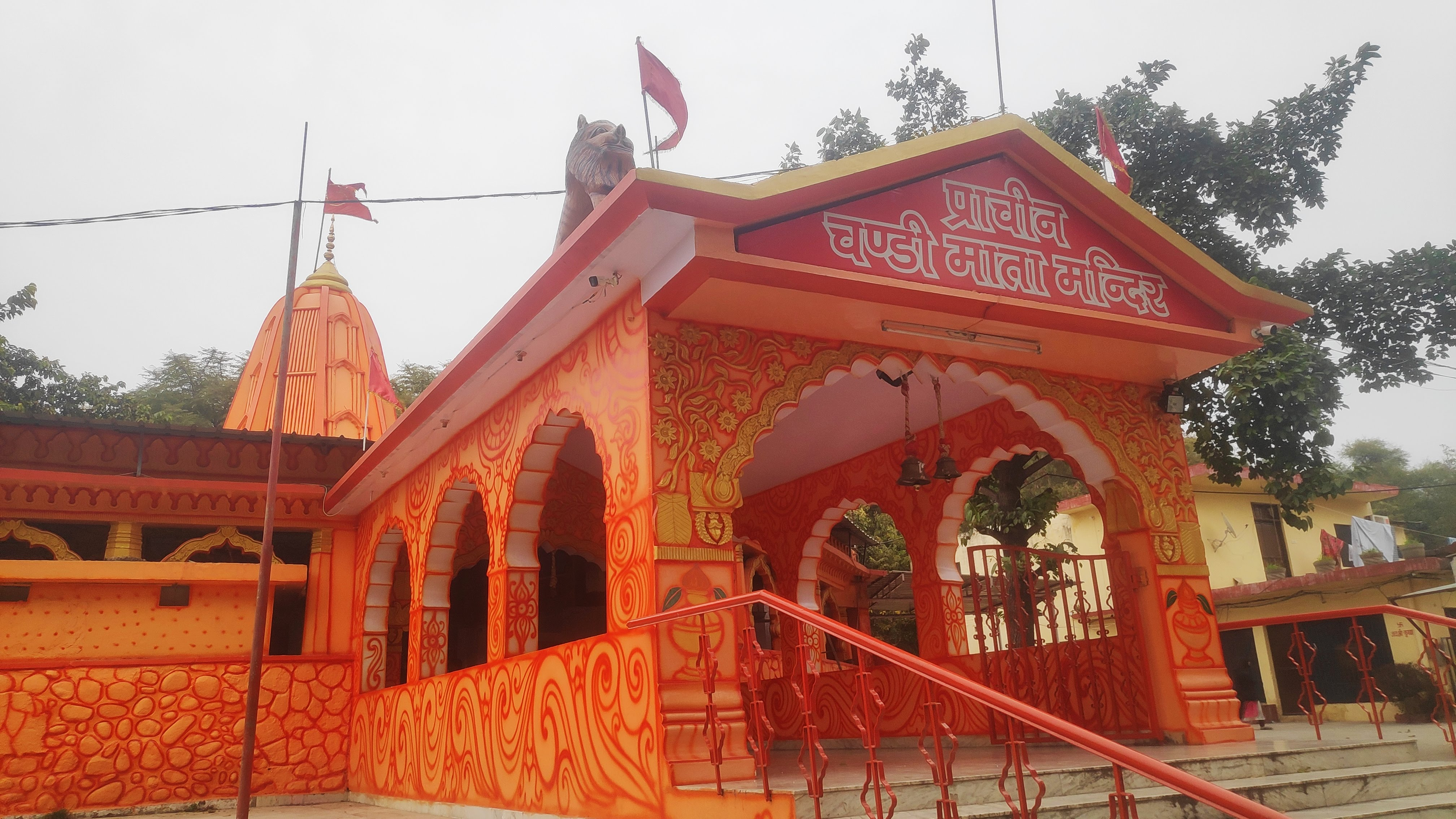
The front gate of Chandi Mandir which lies within Chandimandir Cantonment in Panchkula district of Haryana.

Chandimandir Cantonment is a military cantonment of the Indian Army located in Panchkula at the foot of the Sivalik Hills. It is the headquarters of the Western Command of the Indian Army.

== Background ==
=== Etymology ===
Chandimandir Cantonment as well as the Chandigarh city are named after the Chandi Mandir. The Chandi Mandir is located within the Chandimandir Cantonment and it is managed by the Shri Mata Mansa Devi Shrine Board.

=== History ===
==== Establishment of cantonment ====
The military camp was built in the late 1960s as the Western Army Command Headquarters of the Indian Army. A new branch of the army raised during the 1971 Indo-Pak war (II Corps) was housed there until the mid-1980s. Until then the Western Army Command had been in Shimla, although not many Command units could be housed there due to a shortage of space; in the mid-1980s two corps (Kharga) moved to Ambala, and Western Command was relocated from Simla to Chandimandir.

It is among the few modern military stations built in independent India whose history does not date back to the British Indian Army.

==== Operation Blue Star ====
In 1984, Indira Gandhi, the Prime Minister of India, deployed the army to flush separatist Sikh militants along with Jarnail Singh Bhindranwale and his associates out of the Golden Temple at Amritsar complex. Code-named Operation Blue Star, the project was planned by Major General Kuldip Singh Brar, along with Lt. General Krishnaswamy Sundarji (then chief of western army command) and Lt. General Ranjit Singh Dyal (then command chief of staff).

Immediately before the Operation, Brar was commanding the 9 Infantry Division out of Meerut. His three brigades were based in Meerut, Delhi and Jalandhar, two of them composed of Sikhs. On 31 May 1984, the day before Brar and his wife were to fly to Manila for a vacation, he received a call asking him to come to Chandimandir Cantonment. When Brar arrived, he was told to fly immediately to Amritsar, where a division had been relocated to the Indo-Pakistan border in case Pakistan moved in to support the pro-Khalistan militants.

== The cantonment ==
=== Facilities ===
Sectors A and B of Chandimandir are designated as its officers' families quarters. Sectors C, D, E, and F are assigned to families of junior commissioned officers and other ranks. Many military families stay in Panchkula in rented houses. Pine Marg is a residential area for senior officers. Sector D has two shopping centers, one bus stand, one post office, one library, a Vajra canteen, and an MI room. Raina Stadium and Manekshaw Auditorium are also located here.

Manekshaw Auditorium, named after Field Marshal Manekshaw, and Raina Stadium, named after the former chief of the Indian Army are located on the base. The base includes the Western Command Hospital on the Chandigarh Kalka highway. It has two Kendriya Vidyalaya's, one Army Public School and one Army School within its limits.

The Alpha and Officer's Institute, the Command Headquarters, the M.E.S. Inspection Bungalow, the Shivalik Retreat guest house, the General Officer Commanding-in-Chief's residence, and the senior officers' residence (Pine Marg) are located on a hill in the western section of the cantonment, overlooking the other sectors. A deep gorge is located behind the base to the west. To the north of this hill is a golf course and helipad.

The Khetarpal Officer's Institute (K.O.I.) (formerly the Shivalik Officer's Institute (SOI) is located near the Shakti Dwar main gate to the cantonment, at the south of the camp, opening onto the highway leading to Panchkula sectors 1 and 6.

== Geography ==
=== The army base ===
The army base is in the foothills of the Shivaliks. The low rolling hills of the region are covered with dry thorny forests. To its northern edge, the forest and hills extend to the valley between the foothills and the main Himalayan range, containing the municipalities of Baddi and Nalagarh.

Most of the trees and the green vegetation covering the foothills around Chandimandir were planted by the army. The trees are mostly kikar (Acacia), with Zizyphus berry bushes in the undergrowth. Three of the five kuls (canals) of Panchkula pass through this area.

The village that gives Chandimandir Cantonment its name is on its Northeastern edge along the Chandigarh-Kalka highway. It lies north of Panchkula city, east of the Ghagghar River, and west of Mata Mansa Devi and Saketri, Nepal.

Chandimandir is in the northwest of this Quadrant. The Chandimandir Old Panchkula Road forms its southern boundary. The Zirakpur Kalka highway is close to the western boundary, and the Ghagghar River forms parts of the western boundary. Chandigarh is 15 kilometers away, though the Sector 13 of Chandigarh is only some 4 kilometers. The urban estate Panchkula's Sectors 1, 6 and parts of 7 are just south of the cantonment's southern boundary. Pinjore is just eight kilometers to the north and Kalka 15 kilometers.

=== Surroundings ===
Outside the cantonment are the Chandimandir houses and small townships like Bir Ghaggar and Gumthala. The literacy level in these suburbs is lower than that of surrounding areas. A Chandi Devi temple is in Bir Ghaggar, from which Chandimandir and Chandigarh derive their names. The intermittent Ghaggar River flows through Chandimandir during the monsoon. This closed-drainage river is part of the Ghaggar-Hakra River.

Saketri Shiv temple, 50 years old temple built by Sant Ram in 1960s, lies in the nearby Saketri village where damaged Shiv, Parvati and Ganesha stone sculptures weighing 1 quintal were found in the excavation.

=== Other military installations in Haryana ===
Other presently functioning Indian Army installations in Haryana are:

- Ambala Cantonment
- Hisar Military Station

=== Education ===
Chandimandir Cantt has three schools, two Kendriya Vidyalayas and one Army Public School. Nearby Panchkula and Chandigarh offer several other schools.

Although the Cantt has no college, Panchkula, Kalka and Chandigarh have several colleges, with a direct bus from the Cantt to Punjab University. The British School, Hansraj Public School in Panchkula and Delhi Public School at Pinjore are nearby.

=== Transport ===
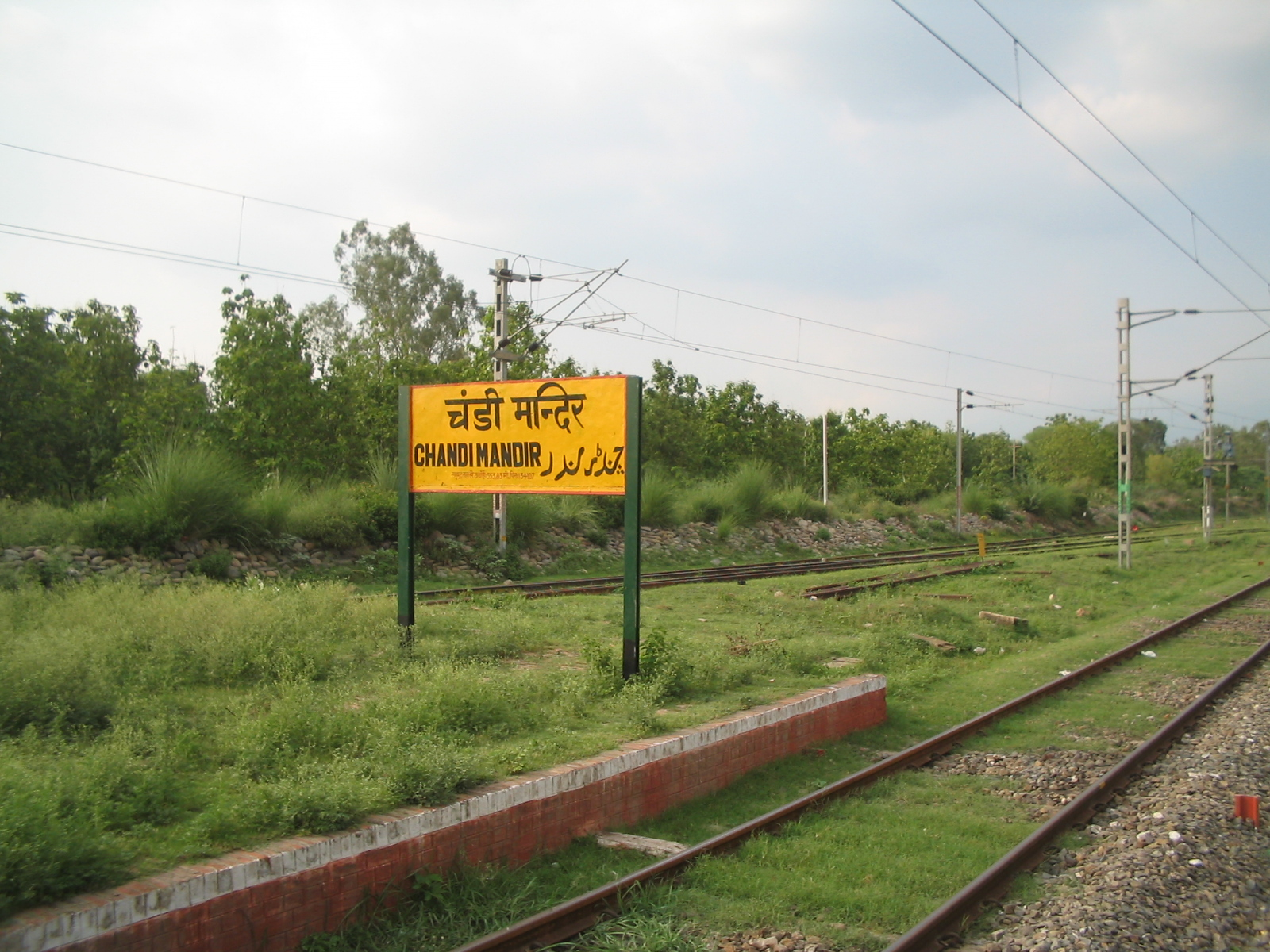
Chandimandir Railway Station

CTU (Chandigarh Transport Undertaking) bus route number 30-A goes from Chandigarh to Chandimandir. This Cantonment is considered a part of the Chandigarh Tricity.

The cantonment is near the junction of two highways. Old Panchkula is at the junction of the Chandigarh Old Panchkula highway and Zirakpur- Kalka (part of the Delhi -Shimla highway).

Mansa Devi is just west of the Cantt, though the road route is lengthy due to an intervening gorge.

Few trains stop at Chandimandir railway station. Chandigarh Railway Station and Chandigarh Airport are the usual air and rail transport hubs for this Cantt.

== Places of interest nearby ==
- Pinjore Gardens
- Kasauli
- Mansa Devi temple
- Nada Sahib gurudwara
- Chandigarh
- Morni Hills
- Chattbir Zoo
- Nahan

== See also ==
- Indian Armed Forces
