= Sector-17, Chandigarh =

Retail hub in Chandigarh, India

- Retail hub
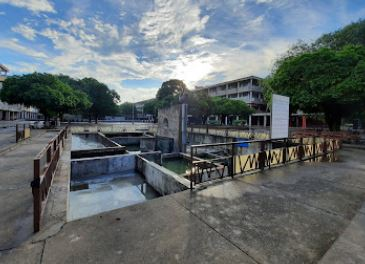
- Sector-17 Chandigarh

- Location within Chandigarh
- Coordinates: 30.73°N 76.78°E
- Country: India
- District: Chandigarh

Languages
  - Official: English
- Time zone: UTC+5:30 (Indian Standard Time)
- PIN: 160017

Sector-17 or Sector-17 Plaza is a retail and entertainment hub in Chandigarh. It is a tree-lined pedestrian plaza with fountains and stores.

== History ==
Sector-17 was constructed at the same time when the city of Chandigarh was built. It was turned into a retail hub after the emergence of three theatres (Neelam, Jagat, KC), offices, Parade Ground, the Inter State Bus Terminus, general post office and many open spaces.

== Facilities ==
Sector-17 is also called Chandigarh's heart. No vehicles are allowed at the plaza, instead there is a multilevel parking lot to park vehicles. The plaza has a fountain. It is a no-vending zone. It has a huge parade ground where Independence day as well as Republic day celebrations are organised every year.

== See also ==
- List of tourist attractions in Chandigarh
