= Pujari =

Designation given to a Hindu temple priest who performs puja

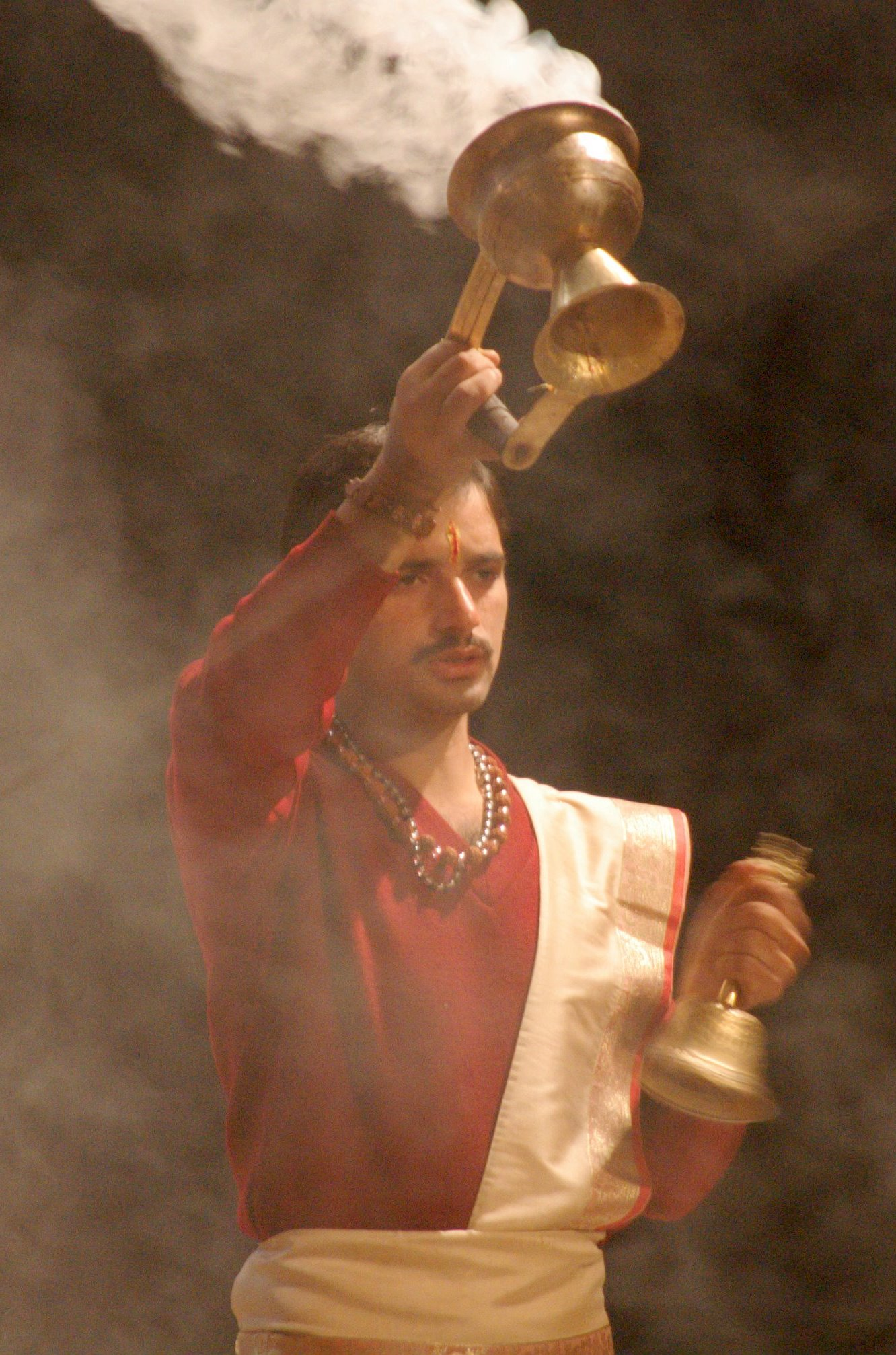
A pujari performing the puja rituals in Varanasi, India.

Pūjari is a designation given to a Hindu temple priest who performs pūja. The word comes from the Sanskrit word "पूजा" meaning worship. They are responsible for performing temple rituals, including pūjā and Aarti. Pujaris also perform rituals such as the bathing of a deity (abhishekam) and the blessing of new vehicles (vahana puja), as well as ceremonies such as weddings and last-rites. These rituals can be held at a temple or elsewhere. Pujari are mainly drawn from the Brahmin varna.

== See also ==
- Pandit
- Purohit
- Yogi
- Bairagi
