= Mani Majra =

Sector 13, Chandigarh Sector 13
- Residential+commercial mixed
- Location within Chandigarh
- Coordinates: 30°43′09″N 76°50′01″E
- Country: India
- Union Territory: Chandigarh

Population
  - Total: Around 3 Lakh
- Time zone: UTC+5:30 (Indian Standard Time)
- PIN: 160101
- Vehicle registration: CH

Manimajra (now referred to as ''Sector 13') is a significant residential and commercial hub in Chandigarh. Reconstituted in February 2020, it bridges the city's historical princely roots with its modern industrial expansion.

== History ==
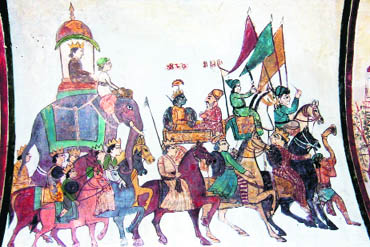
Fresco of a religious procession from the Mansa Devi temple of Mani Majra

The town was founded in 1515 by Mani Ram, a Zamindar under the Lodhi Dynasty. By the 18th century, his descendent Gangaram Singh governed Manimajra and 84 surrounding villages as a Mughal vassal. Following the decline of Mughal authority, Gangaram's son, Gharib Dass, established the independent Manimajra State. Despite early conflicts with the Raja of Nahan, Gharib Dass expanded his territory, seizing Pinjore and establishing the Manimajra Fort as his capital.

Upon his death in 1783, his son Raja Gopal Singh took over, eventually receiving the title of Raja from the British in 1814 for his service in the Gurkha campaign. Gopal Singh is notably responsible for building the Mansa Devi Temple (1811–1815). The dynasty continued through Raja Goverdhan Singh and Raja Gurbaksh Singh, ending with Raja Bhagwan Singh, who died without a male heir in 1866. Consequently, the British annexed the state, and the fort later passed to the Raja of Faridkot through marriage.

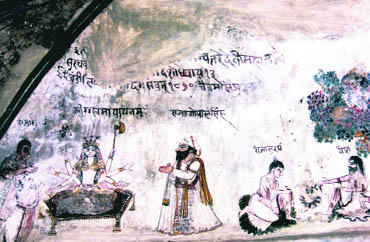
Fresco of Raja Gopal Singh of Mani Majra State (middle, standing with folded hands) paying obeisance to the goddess Mahamaya from the Mansa Devi temple of Mani Majra

In the 20th century, the town was led by Sardar Ajit Singh, who is credited with protecting local Muslim families during the 1947 Partition. The area also saw migration from the Ranas of Kuthar, who became major landowners.

Today, the historical legacy survives through the 500-year-old Shiv Temple and the Manimajra Fort, which served as a filming location for the movie Zero Dark Thirty.

Manimajra Shiv Temple and Thakurdwara is 500 to 600 years old, and was built by the rulers of the area. Shiv temple has Shiva as the main deity and Thakurdwara has Rama, Sita, and Hanuman as chief deities.

== Modern Development: Sector 13 ==
For decades, Manimajra sat outside Chandigarh's formal grid because the city's planner, Le Corbusier, omitted the number 13 due to superstition. Following long-standing demands from residents in upscale enclaves like the Modern Housing Complex (MHC) and Shivalik Enclave, the area was officially integrated into the sectoral grid as Sector 13 in February 2020. This change was enacted by Governor V.P. Singh Badnore under the Capital of Punjab Act of 1952.

=== Infrastructure and economy ===
The sector is a vital economic engine for Chandigarh, featuring:

- Technology & commerce: Home to the Rajiv Gandhi IT Park, which houses campuses for Infosys, Tech Mahindra, and Airtel. It also features Asia's largest motor market and major shopping centers like Fun Republic and DT Mall.
- Residential & facilities: The area contains a mix of urban societies (Uppal's Marble Arch, Rajeev Vihar) and traditional localities (Mari Wala Town, Pipliwala Town). It is supported by the Kalagram cultural center, The Lalit 5-star hotel, and several prominent schools including RIMT World School and Gurukul Global.

== Gallery ==
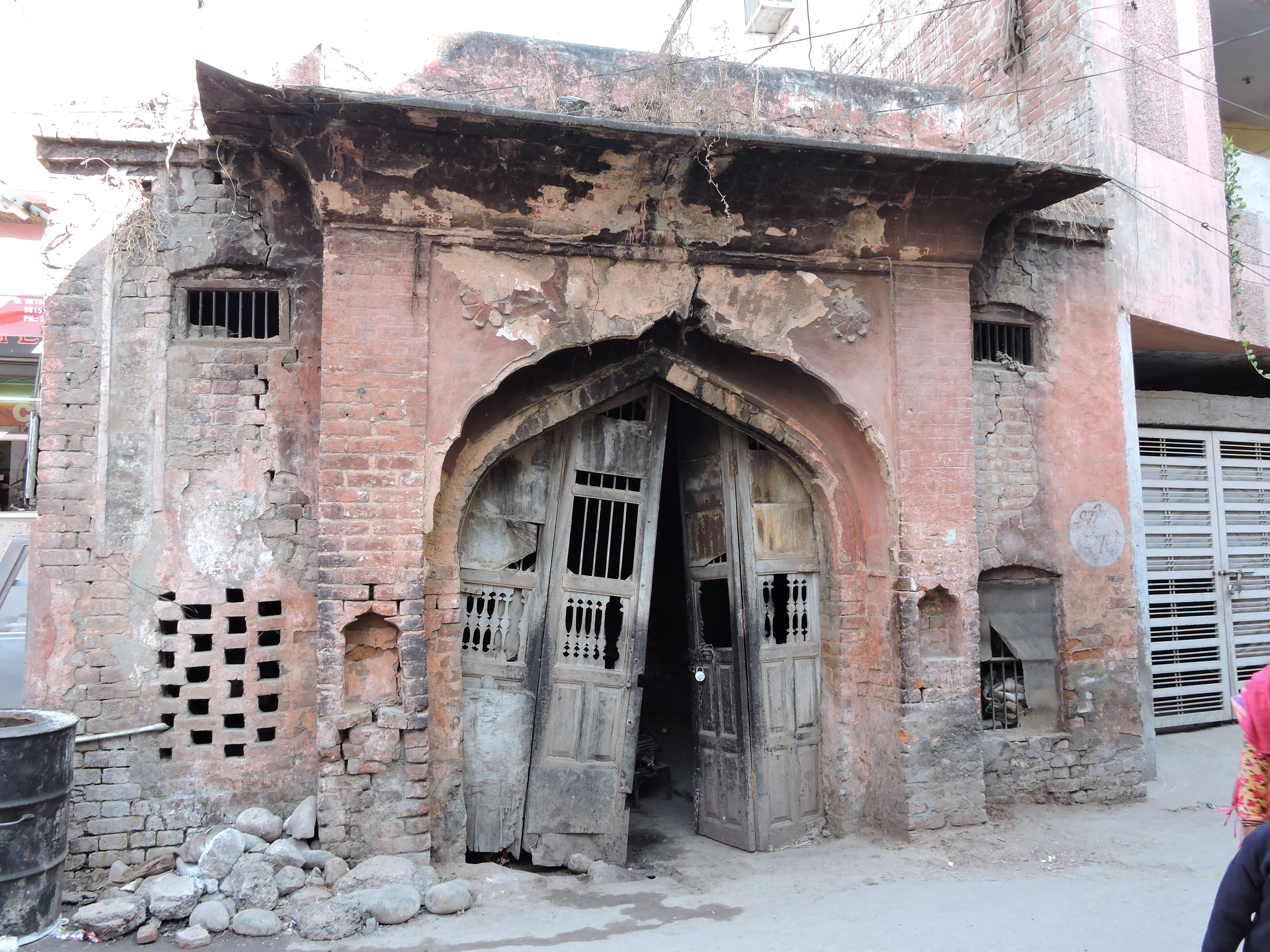
Mani Majra Fort, south side entrance view

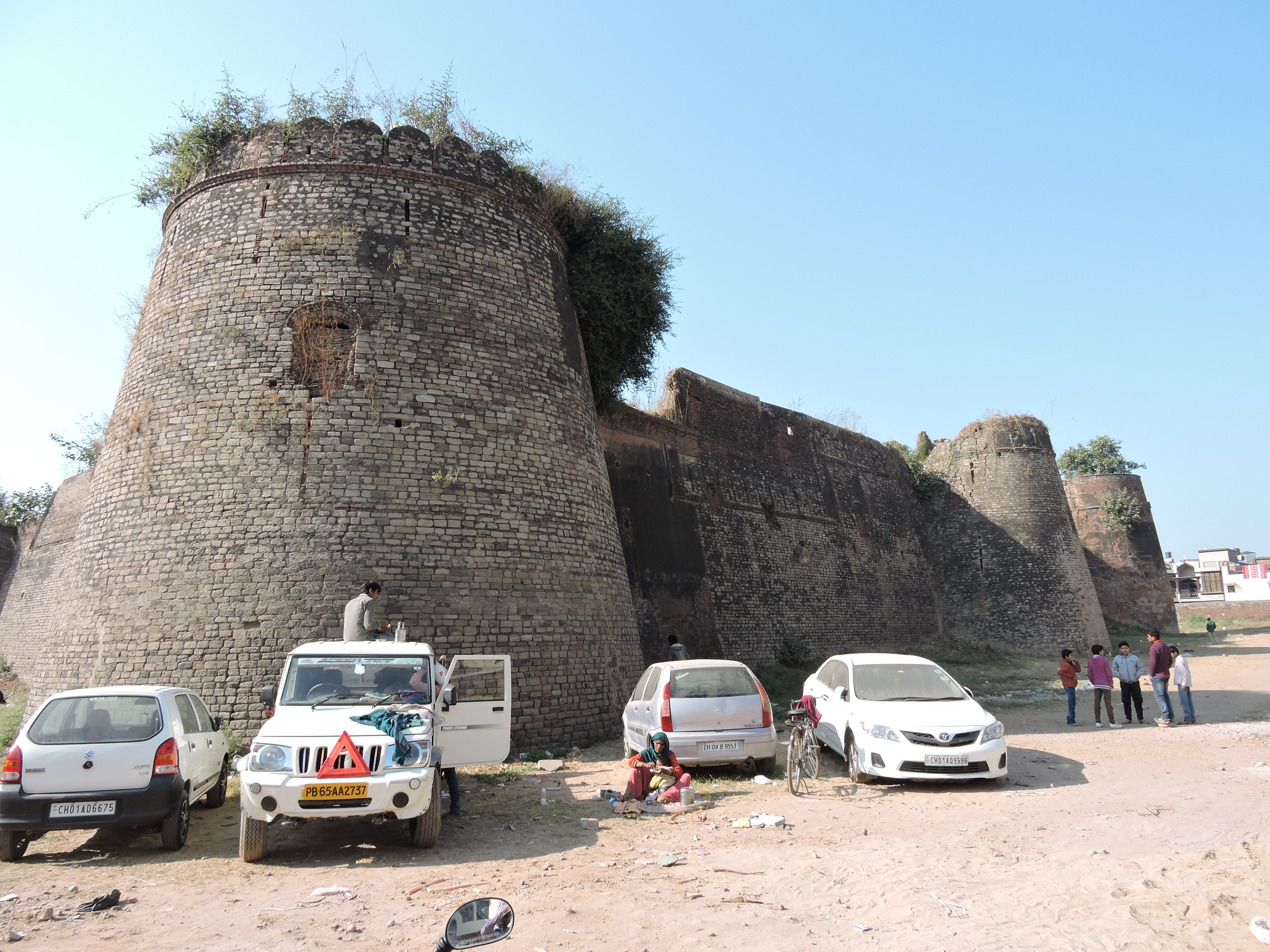
Mani Majra Fort, east side view

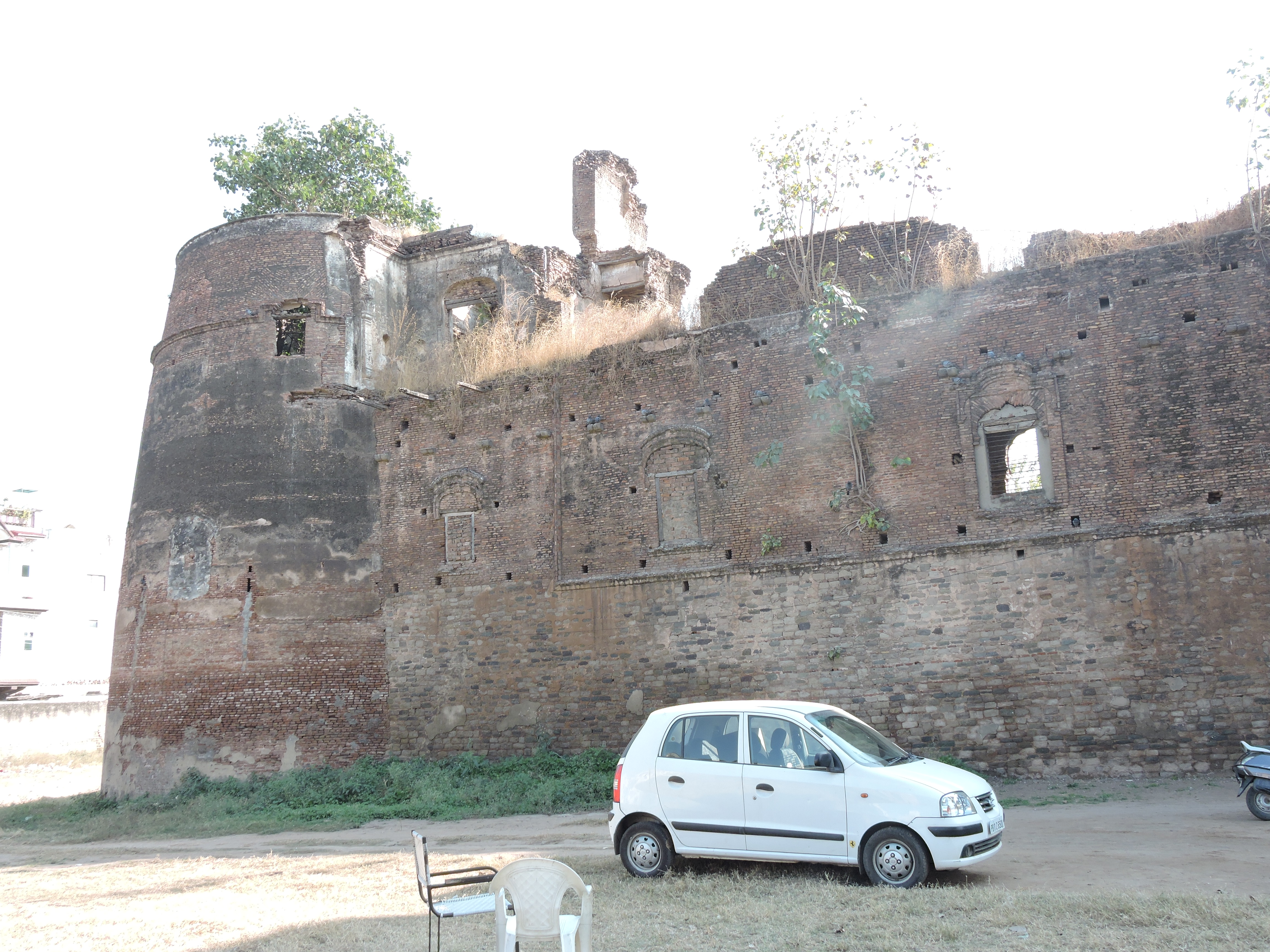
Mani Majra Fort, west side view

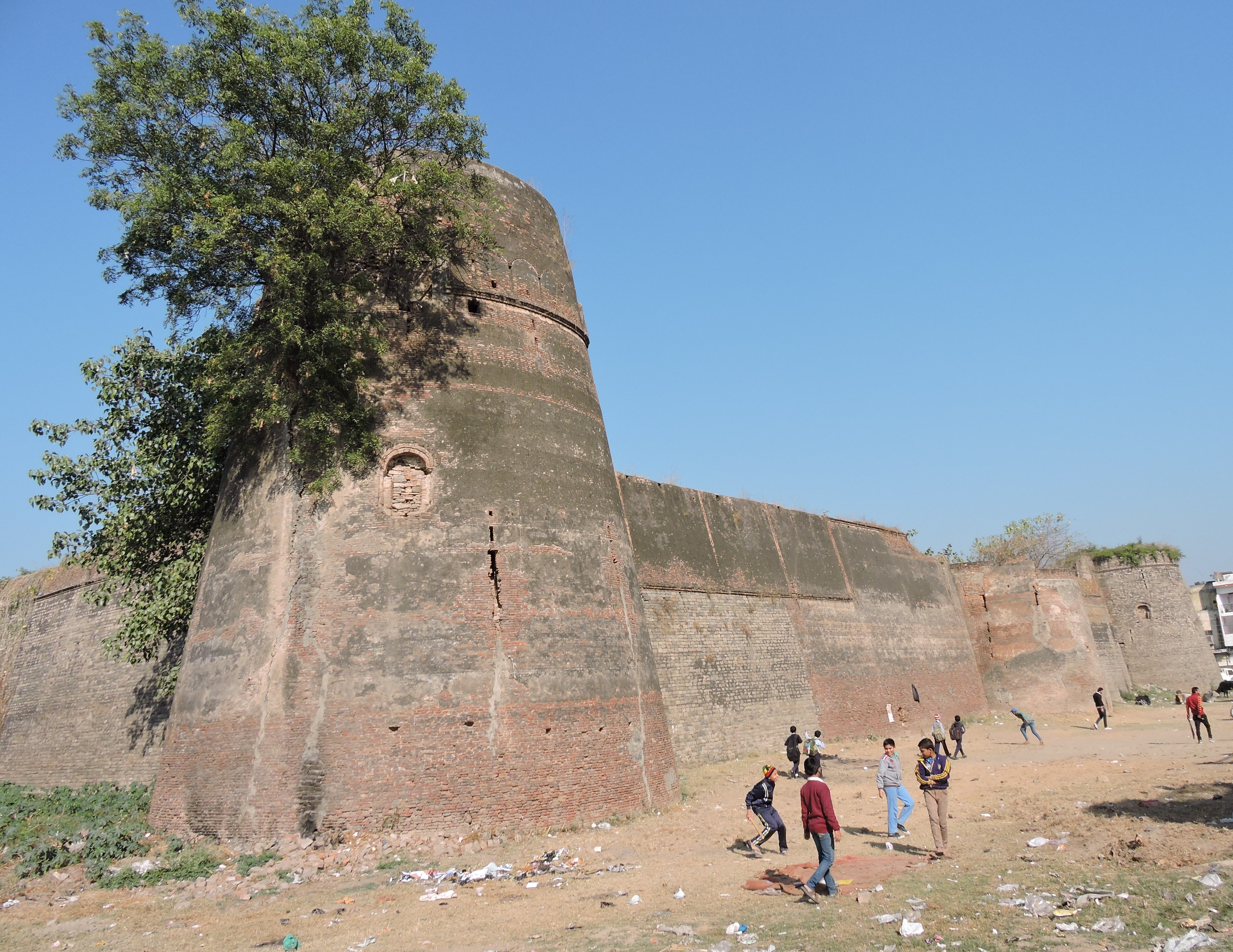
Mani Majra Fort, north side view

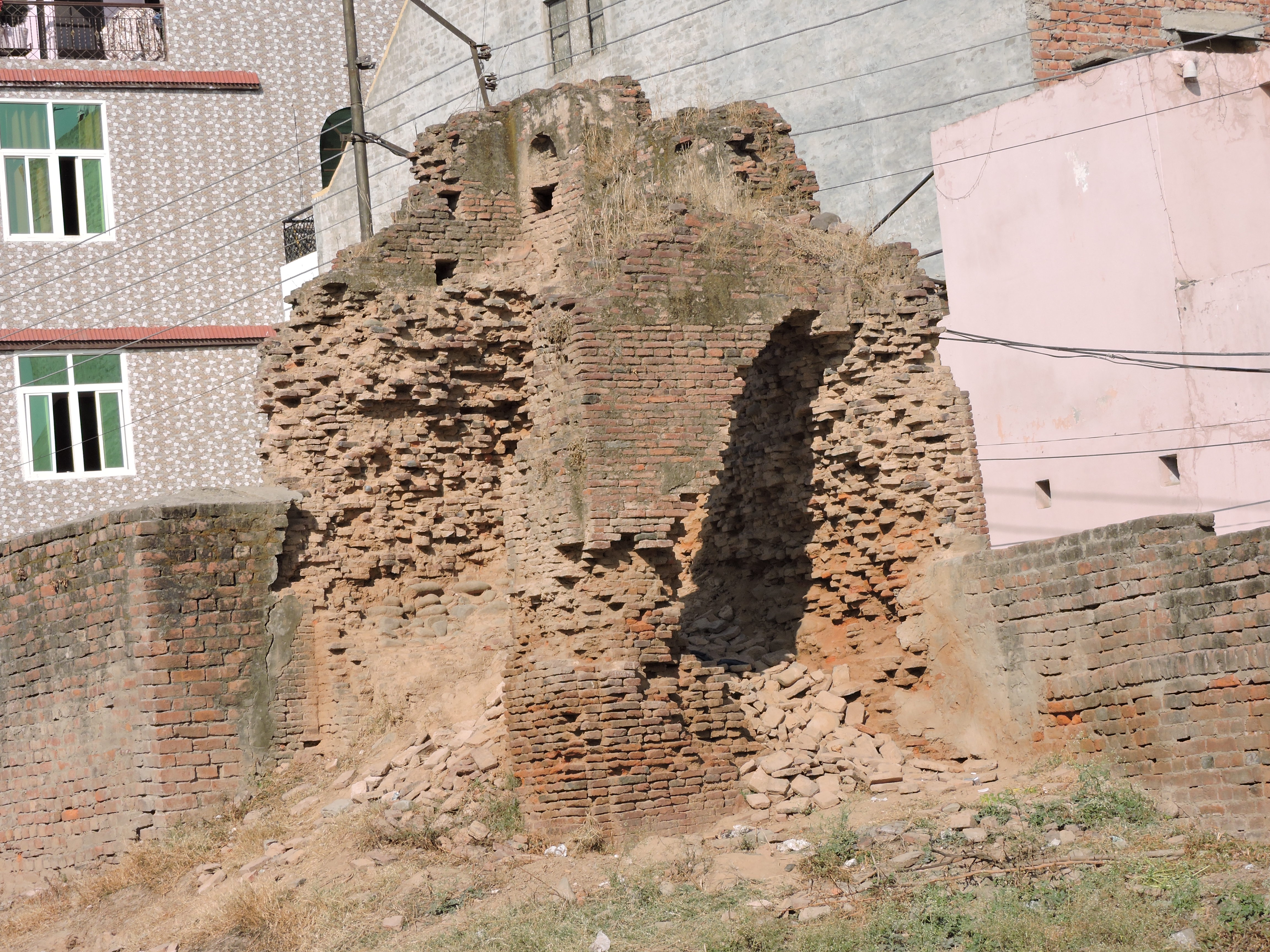
Mani Majra Fort, ruined courtyard view
