= Yamkeshwar =

Tehsil and Administrative block in Uttarakhand, India

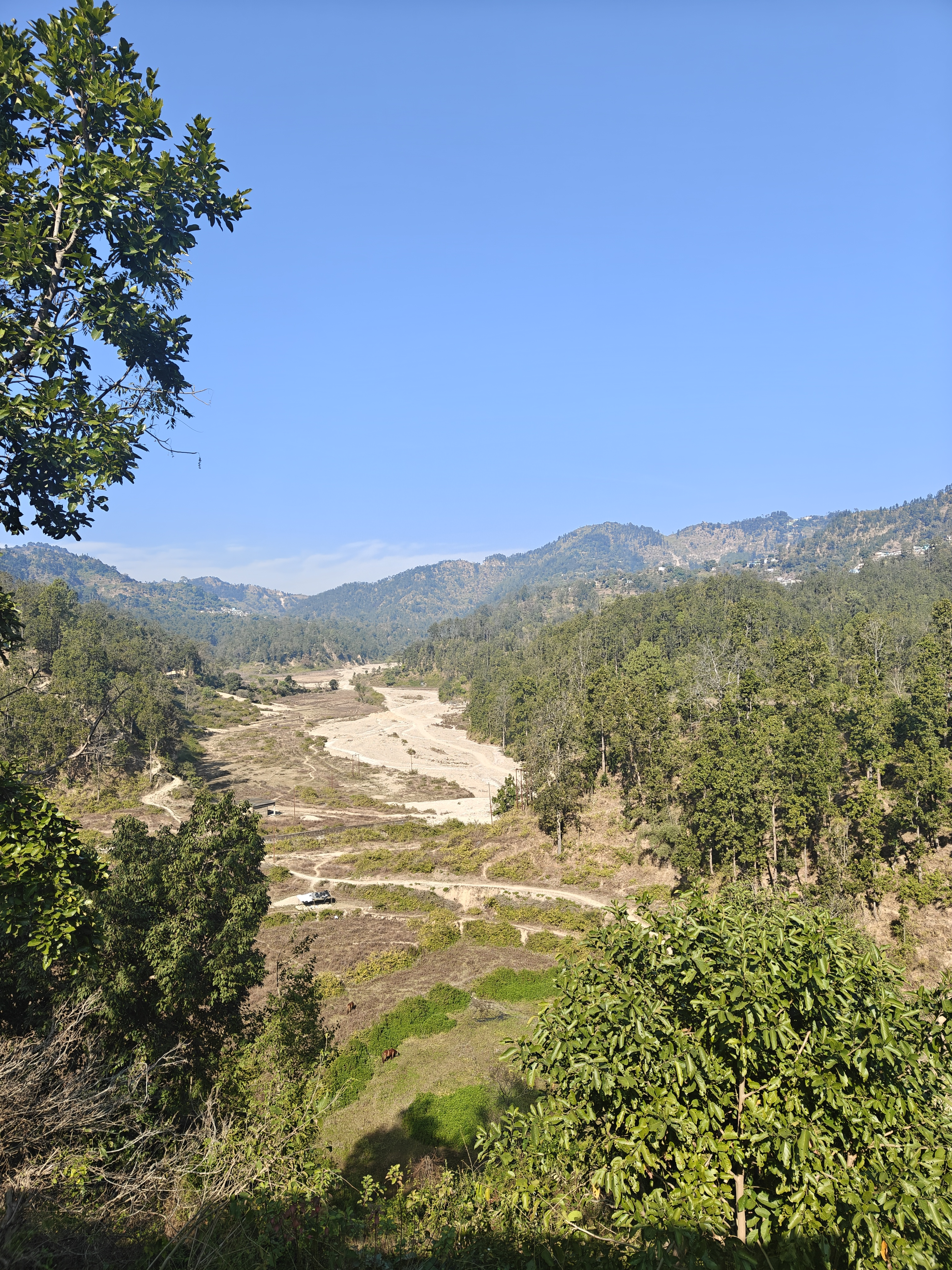
- View of the valley from the Yamkeshwar Block Office in Pauri Garhwal in Uttarakhand

- Location in Uttarakhand, India Yamkeshwar (India)
- Coordinates: 29.992°N 78.402°E
- Country: India
- State: Uttarakhand
- District: Pauri Garhwal

Languages
  - Official: Hindi
- Time zone: UTC+5:30
- PIN: 246275
- Vehicle registration: UK-12
- Website: pauri.gov.in

Yamkeshwar is a small hill settlement and the headquarters of Yamkeshwar tehsil and Yamkeshwar development block in Pauri Garhwal district of the Indian state of Uttarakhand. It lies in the lower Himalayan region of the Garhwal division and is administered under the Kotdwar subdivision of Pauri Garhwal district.

== Geography ==
Yamkeshwar is situated in the mountainous southern part of Pauri Garhwal district. The surrounding landscape is characterized by forested hills, ridges and valleys typical of the lower Himalayan region. Pauri Garhwal district lies between the Himalayan districts to the north and the plains and foothill districts to the south and west. The Nayyar River is one of the principal rivers of the district.

== History ==
The place gets its name from the ancient temple of Yamkeshwar, which according to local lore is the place where Markandeya rishi was saved from Yamaraj by God Shiva. The tehsil is part of Yamkeshwar Assembly constituency and currently represented by Renu Bisht of BJP. The tehsil also has the ancestral village of UP CM Yogi Adityanath.

== Administration ==
Yamkeshwar is one of the nine tehsils of Pauri Garhwal district. The tehsil comes under the Kotdwar subdivision. It is also one of the district's 15 development blocks.The Yamkeshwar development block is administered through a Block Development Officer and is responsible for the implementation of rural development programmes in the block. The block contains 86 gram panchayats and 238 villages.

== Transport ==
The tehsil is well connected by road and can be reached either from Haridwar and Rishikesh, or through Kotdwar and Lansdowne. Majority of the Tehsil is rural and hilly area.

The nearest major railway connection for the Pauri Garhwal region is at Kotdwar, while Jolly Grant Airport near Dehradun provides air connectivity for the wider region.

== Controversies ==
In 2022, the tehsil was in the news for the Ankita Bhandari murder case.
