= 2025 Kotdwar Municipal Corporation election =

Election to the municipal corporation of Kotdwar

- 23 January 2025

All 40 seats in the Kotdwar Municipal Corporation 21 seats needed for a majority

	Majority party	Minority party	Third party
Leader	Shailendra Singh Rawat	Ranjana Rawat	None
Party	BJP	INC	Independent
Last election	12	13	15
Seats won	18	9	13
Seat change	▲6	▼4	▼2
Mayor before election
Hemlata Negi
INC
Elected mayor
Shailendra Singh Rawat
BJP

The 2025 Kotdwar Municipal Corporation election was a municipal election to the Kotdwar Municipal Corporation which governs Kotdwar city. It took place on 23 January 2025.

== Election schedule ==
The election schedule was announced by the state election commission on 23 December 2024.

Poll Event	Schedule
Notification Date	27 December 2024
Last Date for filing nomination	30 December 2024
Scrutiny of nomination	31 December 2024
Last Date for Withdrawal of nomination	2 January 2025
Allotment of Symbols	3 January 2025
Date of Poll	23 January 2025
Date of Counting of Votes	25 January 2025

== Candidates ==
=== Mayoral ===
No.	Party	Symbol	Candidate's Name
1	Bharatiya Janata Party		Shailendra Singh Rawat
2	Indian National Congress		Ranjana Rawat

== Results ==
=== Mayoral election ===
2025 Kotdwar Municipal Corporation Election: Mayor
Party	Candidate	Votes	%	±%
BJP	Shailendra Singh Rawat	38,175	52.25	▲34.75
INC	Ranjana Rawat	23,944	32.77	▼6.19
Independent	Mahendra Pal Singh Rawat	8,059	11.25	New
UKD	Mahendra Singh Rawat	1,263	1.76	▼0.09
BSP	Mahendra Negi	806	1.12	▲0.15
Independent	Gopal Krishna Barthawal	426	0.59	New
NOTA	None of the above	377	0.52	▲0.07
Majority		14,231	19.48	▲17.06
Turnout		73,050		
BJP gain from INC		Swing	▲34.75	

=== Results by party ===
Party	Seats		
Party	Contested	Won	+/−
Bharatiya Janata Party	40	18	▲6
Indian National Congress	38	9	▼4
Other parties	8 (Note: 5 candidates belong to AAP and 3 to the UKD.)	0	Steady
Independents	82	13	▼2
NOTA			
Total	168	40	

== See also ==
- 2025 Uttarakhand local elections
- 2025 Dehradun Municipal Corporation election
- 2025 Roorkee Municipal Corporation election
- 2025 Haridwar Municipal Corporation election
- 2025 Haldwani Municipal Corporation election
- 2025 Rudrapur Municipal Corporation election
- 2025 Pithoragarh Municipal Corporation election
- 2025 Rishikesh Municipal Corporation election
- 2025 Almora Municipal Corporation election
- 2025 Kashipur Municipal Corporation election
- 2025 Srinagar Municipal Corporation election
