= 2022 Indian communal violence =

2022 Indian communal violence may refer to:

- April 2022 Indian communal violence
- riots following the 2022 BJP Muhammad remarks controversy
