= Stone pelting in India =

Criminal assault in the form of stone throwing

Stone pelting in India refers to criminal assault in the form of stone throwing by individuals or mob who pelt, bombard or throw stones at security personnel, police forces, healthcare workers and trains. Stone pelting began with incidents of stone pelting in Kashmir, but became less frequent after the revocation of article 370 of the Constitution of India and the conversion of the state into union territories.

== Incidents in Kashmir ==
In the past, stones were pelted by the Kashmiri Muslim youth at the police in the streets of Srinagar for expressing their anger during 1931 Kashmir agitation. After the rise of insurgency and separatist movement in Kashmir conflict, the stone pelting incidents became prominent in Kashmir from the 2008 Kashmir protests in which the separatist movement had taken a new dimension from gun-fighting with armed forces to the pelting of stones on them. After the year 2008, stone pelting incidents in the valley were reported on regular basis, the prominent among them were recorded in 2010 Kashmir unrest and 2016–2017 Kashmir unrest, nevertheless minor skirmishes were also reported in those intermediate years. In 2016, Kashmir witnessed 2690 stone pelting incidents in various districts with Baramulla topping the list with 492 incidents followed by Srinagar and Kupwara each with 339 incidents. The least recorded incidents were 65 in Ganderbal. According to official data of state home department, North Kashmir saw the highest number of 1,248 incidents followed by 875 incidents in South Kashmir and 567 in Central Kashmir.

== Anti-CAA protests ==
The incidents of stone pelting were reported in Seelampur (17 December 2019), Ahmedabad (19 December 2019), Jamia Milia Islamia (30 December 2019). On 24 February, violent clashes occurred at Jaffrabad and Maujpur in which one police officer and a protester were killed. The pro-CAA demonstrators and anti-CAA protesters indulged in stone pelting with each other and vandalised houses, vehicles and shops. The police personnel used tear gas and lathi charge against the protestors. Later, it was reported that four protestors also died during the violence.

== Trains ==
From 2013-2019, 118 cases of stone pelting were registered on Mumbai railways, injuring 113 commuters. In 2022, 1503 cases of stone pelting on moving trains were registered by the Railway Protection Force followed by the arrest of 488 persons.

Legal Punishment for stone pelting in India founds its place under the Bhartiya Nyaya Sanhita, Railways Act, National Security Act, Indian Penal Code, Prevention of Damage to Public Property Act, Unlawful Activities (Prevention) Act, 1967 (UAPA), and Juvenile Justice (Care and Protection of Children) Act, 2015.

== Coronavirus lockdown ==
The incidents erupted again during the coronavirus lockdown with the attack on health workers and policemen in Indore, Madhya Pradesh. A similar incident took place in Jaudiya naka, Haryana on 4 May 2019. Gujarat police used tear-gas to contain an incident of stone-pelting in Godhara.

In Uttar Pradesh, people attacked medical staff in Meerut. Four were arrested including Imam after that. Cops were attacked by villagers in Muzaffarnagar while trying to enforce lockdown. SI and constable sustained serious injuries. A mob tried to stop a medical team from taking a coronavirus-infected man into isolation in Moradabad. They hurled stones at an ambulance that left four injured. The injured persons include one doctor and three paramedics. A police vehicle was also damaged in the attack. 17 stone pelters were arrested. Court hearing was held at 3 am, and all 17 of them were jail by 5 am. Five of the arrested stone pelters were later tested positive in COVID-19 tests. Locals pelted stones at Cops in Aligarh as they tried to enforce lockdown, one policeman was injured. CM Yogi Adityanath said that perpetrators be charged under the stringent National Security Act, Epidemic Act and the Disaster Management Act for resorting to violence and preventing the health and police officials from doing their duty. He further ordered to confiscate properties of accused to recover the damages.

The state government later decided to use the UP Recovery of Public and Private Property Ordinance, 2020 against those indulging in violence. 295 accused including many Tablighi Jamaat members were shifted to temporary jails in UP after completing quarantine period. 64 people, including 54 foreign nationals, were lodged in a Saharanpur juvenile home that was converted into a temporary jail. 46 people, including 15 foreign nationals, were lodged in a Jaunpur temporary jail. 45 people, including 16 foreign nationals, were shifted to a temporary jail in Bulandshahr. The numbers for the other districts were: Prayagraj (30, including 16 foreign nationals), Lucknow (23 foreign nationals), Varanasi (22 locals), Sultanpur (17, including 10 foreign nationals) Gyanpur in Bhadohi (14 including 11 foreigners), Moradabad (14), Bijnor (eight foreign nationals), Sitapur (four, including three foreigners) and Agra (seven). All the foreign nationals were members of the Tablighi Jamaat who came to India from Kyrgyzstan, Tajikistan, Bangladesh, Indonesia, Nepal, Sudan, Thailand, Malaysia, Saudi Arabia, France, Palestine, Syria, Mali and Morocco to attend a religious congregation. UP govt sets up 34 temporary jails to lodge Jamaatees. Due to several attacks on the doctors and other health officials and demands from ICMR and Resident Doctors Association, Union Government led by PM Narendra Modi brought an ordinance and announced punishment for the attacker with up to seven years and also fine of up to 5 Lakh rupees.

== Religious ==
Stone-pelting incidents connected to religious processions and festivals have been recorded across multiple Indian states, particularly during Ram Navami, Hanuman Jayanti, Ganesh Visarjan, and other Hindu processions, as well as occasionally during Muslim religious observances such as Milad-un-Nabi. Such incidents have occurred sporadically since at least 2015 and increased noticeably from 2022 onward.

According to data compiled by the Centre for Study of Society and Secularism (CSSS), communal riots in India rose by 84 percent in 2024 compared with the previous year, with religious processions and idol-immersion ceremonies identified as a leading trigger; the report recorded seven riots during Saraswati Puja idol immersions and four during Ganesh-related events that year alone. Incidents during this period were reported in states including Maharashtra, Gujarat, West Bengal, Uttar Pradesh, Jharkhand, and Goa, most commonly during Ram Navami processions and Ganesh idol processions or immersions.

A cluster of Ram Navami processions in late March 2022 led to stone-pelting and related clashes in several cities, including Malad in Mumbai, where a procession accompanied by high-volume amplified music was pelted with stones and twenty people were subsequently arrested; Vadodara, Gujarat, where clashes broke out during processions organised by the Vishwa Hindu Parishad and Bajrang Dal; and Howrah, West Bengal, where tension escalated after stones were allegedly thrown at a procession, prompting the state government to warn of strict action.

In September 2024, a wave of stone-pelting incidents during Ganesh Visarjan and related processions was reported in several cities, including Surat, where police arrested 27 people, including six minors, after stones were thrown at a Ganesh pandal; Lucknow, where News18 reported that a mob broke an urn at a Ganesh Puja pandal while chanting "Allahu Akbar"; and Mahoba, Uttar Pradesh. Similar incidents were also reported near the Hubli Idgah Maidan and in Bengaluru during Ganesh Visarjan processions in 2023, and in Lohardaga, Jharkhand, in September 2023.

Incidents have also occurred outside these two festival clusters. On 17 August 2024, stones were pelted in Nashik and Jalgaon, Maharashtra, during protests over what demonstrators said were attacks on Hindus and minorities in Bangladesh, injuring 18 police officers and several other people. In September 2024, stones were thrown at a temple in Mandsaur, Madhya Pradesh, during a Milad-un-Nabi procession, injuring an assistant to the temple priest and prompting protests by Hindu organisations. A further incident was reported near Dasna Devi Temple in Ghaziabad in October 2024.

=== Causes ===
Scholars and civil-society groups have identified several recurring, often overlapping factors behind stone-pelting incidents connected to religious processions in India.

Procession routes: A 2023 report by the Citizens and Lawyers Initiative, Routes of Wrath: Weaponising Religious Processions, concluded that the route chosen by procession organisers — particularly routes passing through religious-minority-majority areas or near places of worship — has historically been the most consistent trigger for communal violence connected to processions, a concern the report traces back to the drafting of the Indian Penal Code in 1860.

Amplified music and provocative content: Academic and journalistic accounts have documented the use of loud sound systems playing songs with anti-Muslim lyrics — informally termed "H-Pop" (Hindutva pop) — during some Hindu processions, particularly when passing near mosques, as a factor in triggering clashes. Commentators trace disputes over procession music back to incidents in Calcutta (1924), Nagpur (1926), and Surat (1927).

Political incentives and policing response: Human Rights Watch has said religious festivals have increasingly been used by political actors to mobilise supporters, and has alleged uneven enforcement by authorities against different communities involved in clashes. Other commentators have linked spikes in procession-related violence to state and national election cycles.

Academic frameworks: Political scientists Paul Brass and Ashutosh Varshney have separately argued that organised "riot networks" convert routine communal tension into large-scale violence, and that the presence or absence of durable inter-communal civic engagement helps explain why some localities experience recurring violence while similar towns do not.

== See also ==
- Violence against healthcare professionals in India
