= Yamkeshwar Assembly constituency =

Legislative Assembly constituency in Uttarakhand State, India

Coordinates: 29.98°N 78.42°E

Yamkeshwar
- Constituency No. 36 for the Uttarakhand Legislative Assembly

Constituency details
- Country: India
- Region: North India
- State: Uttarakhand
- District: Pauri Garhwal
- Lok Sabha constituency: Garhwal
- Total electors: 88,734
- Reservation: None

Member of Legislative Assembly
- 5th Uttarakhand Legislative Assembly
- Incumbent Renu Bisht
- Party: Bharatiya Janata Party
- Elected year: 2022

Yamkeshwar is one of the 70 constituencies in the Uttarakhand Legislative Assembly of Uttarakhand state of India. Yamkeshwar is also part of Garhwal Lok Sabha constituency.

== Members of the Legislative Assembly ==
| Election | Member | Party |
|---|---|---|
| 2002 | Vijaya Barthwal | Bharatiya Janata Party |
| 2007 | Vijaya Barthwal | Bharatiya Janata Party |
| 2012 | Vijaya Barthwal | Bharatiya Janata Party |
| 2017 | Ritu Khanduri Bhushan | Bharatiya Janata Party |
| 2022 | Renu Bisht | Bharatiya Janata Party |

== Election results ==
=== 2027 Assembly election ===
2027 Uttarakhand Legislative Assembly election: Yamkeshwar
| Party | Candidate | Votes | % | ±% |
|---|---|---|---|---|
| INC | Renu Bisht | | | |
| BJP | Vijay Barthwal | | | |
| NOTA | None of the above | | | |
| Majority | | | | |
| Turnout | | | | |
| gain from | | Swing | | |

=== Assembly Election 2022 ===
2022 Uttarakhand Legislative Assembly election: Yamkeshwar
| Party | Candidate | Votes | % | ±% |
|---|---|---|---|---|
| BJP | Renu Bisht | 28,390 | 58.98% | ▲16.36 |
| INC | Shailendra Singh Rawat | 17,980 | 37.35% | ▲15.07 |
| UKD | Shanti Prasad Bhatt | 613 | 1.27% | ▲0.10 |
| NOTA | None of the above | 526 | 1.09% | ▼1.05 |
| AAP | Aviral | 454 | 0.94% | New |
| Margin of victory | | 10,410 | 21.63% | ▲2.16 |
| Turnout | | 48,138 | 52.99% | ▼0.20 |
| Registered electors | | 90,838 | | ▲4.68 |
| BJP hold | | Swing | ▲16.36 | |

=== Assembly Election 2017 ===
2017 Uttarakhand Legislative Assembly election: Yamkeshwar
| Party | Candidate | Votes | % | ±% |
|---|---|---|---|---|
| BJP | Ritu Khanduri Bhushan | 19,671 | 42.62% | ▲10.67 |
| Independent | Renu Bisht | 10,689 | 23.16% | New |
| INC | Shailendra Singh Rawat | 10,283 | 22.28% | ▼1.50 |
| Independent | Prashant Badoni | 2,698 | 5.85% | New |
| NOTA | None of the above | 988 | 2.14% | New |
| UKD | Shanti Prasad Bhatt | 542 | 1.17% | ▼6.99 |
| BSP | Jagpal Singh Negi | 375 | 0.81% | ▼0.45 |
| Independent | Kirshan Chandra | 250 | 0.54% | New |
| Independent | (Brig) Govind Prasad Barthwal | 235 | 0.51% | New |
| Margin of victory | | 8,982 | 19.46% | ▲11.29 |
| Turnout | | 46,155 | 53.19% | ▼2.25 |
| Registered electors | | 86,774 | | ▲11.04 |
| BJP hold | | Swing | ▲10.67 | |

=== Assembly Election 2012 ===
2012 Uttarakhand Legislative Assembly election: Yamkeshwar
| Party | Candidate | Votes | % | ±% |
|---|---|---|---|---|
| BJP | Vijaya Barthwal | 13,842 | 31.95% | ▼5.36 |
| INC | Sarojani Devi | 10,301 | 23.78% | ▼4.04 |
| URM | Renu Bisht | 8,541 | 19.71% | New |
| UKD | Dr. Shakti Shail Kaparawan | 3,539 | 8.17% | ▼1.27 |
| Independent | Manoj Kulashri | 2,149 | 4.96% | New |
| Sainik Samaj Party | Shurbir Singh Bisht | 1,212 | 2.80% | New |
| Independent | Chandra Prakash | 859 | 1.98% | New |
| Independent | Col. Harpal Singh Bist (Ret) | 853 | 1.97% | New |
| BSP | Kuldeep Singh Rawat | 545 | 1.26% | ▼0.66 |
| Independent | Shatrughan Prasad | 542 | 1.25% | New |
| Independent | Ashok Singh | 378 | 0.87% | New |
| Margin of victory | | 3,541 | 8.17% | ▼1.31 |
| Turnout | | 43,326 | 55.44% | ▲1.88 |
| Registered electors | | 78,147 | | |
| BJP hold | | Swing | ▼5.36 | |

=== Assembly Election 2007 ===
2007 Uttarakhand Legislative Assembly election: Yamkeshwar
| Party | Candidate | Votes | % | ±% |
|---|---|---|---|---|
| BJP | Vijaya Barthwal | 11,172 | 37.31% | ▲10.86 |
| INC | Renu Bisht | 8,331 | 27.82% | ▲6.54 |
| Independent | Digamber Kukreti | 4,902 | 16.37% | New |
| UKD | Dr. Shakti Shail Kaparawan | 2,827 | 9.44% | ▲6.83 |
| Independent | Rajesh Kukreti | 636 | 2.12% | New |
| BSP | Usha Devi | 575 | 1.92% | New |
| Independent | Manohar Lal Barthwal | 427 | 1.43% | New |
| Independent | Navneet | 415 | 1.39% | New |
| Independent | Madan Singh Butola Rawat | 389 | 1.30% | New |
| SP | Arun Tiwari | 273 | 0.91% | New |
| Margin of victory | | 2,841 | 9.49% | ▲4.32 |
| Turnout | | 29,947 | 53.90% | ▲7.37 |
| Registered electors | | 55,907 | | |
| BJP hold | | Swing | ▲10.86 | |

=== Assembly Election 2002 ===
2002 Uttaranchal Legislative Assembly election: Yamkeshwar
| Party | Candidate | Votes | % | ±% |
|---|---|---|---|---|
| BJP | Vijaya Barthwal | 7,404 | 26.44% | New |
| INC | Sarojani Kaintura | 5,957 | 21.27% | New |
| Independent | Digamber Kukreti | 4,684 | 16.73% | New |
| Independent | Hari Singh | 2,322 | 8.29% | New |
| Independent | Satya Prakash | 1,664 | 5.94% | New |
| Independent | Lakhan Singh | 1,402 | 5.01% | New |
| Uttarakhand Janwadi Party | Bhagawati Prasad | 1,313 | 4.69% | New |
| UKD | Ram Lal | 730 | 2.61% | New |
| LJP | Kunwar Singh | 540 | 1.93% | New |
| Independent | Shridhar Chamoli | 533 | 1.90% | New |
| Independent | Bhagat Singh | 376 | 1.34% | New |
| Margin of victory | | 1,447 | 5.17% | |
| Turnout | | 28,001 | 46.23% | |
| Registered electors | | 60,616 | | |
| BJP win (new seat) | | | | |

== See also ==
- Pauri Garhwal district
- List of constituencies of Uttarakhand Legislative Assembly
