= Renu Bisht =

Indian politician

- Incumbent
- Assumed office 10 March 2022
- Preceded by: Ritu Khanduri Bhushan (BJP)
- Constituency: Yamkeshwar

Personal details
- Party: Bhartiya Janata Party

Renu Bisht is an Indian politician and MLA from Yamkeshwar Assembly, Kotdwar. She is member of the Bharatiya Janata Party. Renu Bisht's was accused in the Ankita Bhandari murder case for alleged destruction of evidence by way of ordering speedy demolition of Vanantra Resort after the murder. The move was initially presented as extrajudicial Bulldozer Justice by chief minister Pushkar Singh Dhami on a Twitter Post.

== Involvement in Ankita Bhandari Murder Case ==
While testifying in the court, JCB driver Deepak admitted that he had operated a JCB to bulldoze parts of the Vanantra Resort, a possible site of Ankita Bhandari's murder and alleged sexual abuse, by owner Pulkit Arya, son of then BJP senior leader, Vinod Arya. Deepak claimed the then sub-collector, Pramod Kumar and BJP MLA, Renu Bisht both personally witnessed the demolition of the resort.

== Electoral performance ==
| Election | Constituency | Party | Result | Votes % | Opposition Candidate | Opposition Party | Opposition vote % | Ref |
|---|---|---|---|---|---|---|---|---|
| 2022 | Yamkeshwar | BJP | Won | 58.98% | Shailendra Singh Rawat | INC | 37.35% | |
| 2017 | Yamkeshwar | Independent | Lost | 23.16% | Ritu Khanduri Bhushan | BJP | 42.62% | |
| 2012 | Yamkeshwar | URM | Lost | 19.71% | Vijay Brathwal | BJP | 31.95% | |
| 2007 | Yamkeshwar | INC | Lost | 27.82% | Vijay Barthwal | BJP | 37.31% | |
