= Kotdwar Assembly constituency =

Constituency of the Uttarakhand legislative assembly in India

Coordinates: 29.745°N 78.519°E

Kotdwar
- Constituency No. 41 for the Uttarakhand Legislative Assembly

Constituency details
- Country: India
- Region: North India
- State: Uttarakhand
- District: Pauri Garhwal
- Lok Sabha constituency: Garhwal
- Total electors: 115,891
- Reservation: None

Member of Legislative Assembly
- 5th Uttarakhand Legislative Assembly
- Incumbent Ritu Khanduri Bhushan
- Party: BJP
- Elected year: 2022

Kotdwar Legislative Assembly constituency Vidhan Sabha constituency is one of the 70 assembly constituencies of Uttarakhand, a northern state of India. Kotdwar is a part of Garhwal Lok Sabha constituency.

== Members of the Legislative Assembly ==
Election	Member	Party
2002	Surendra Singh Negi	Indian National Congress
2007	Shailendra Singh Rawat	Bharatiya Janata Party
2012	Surendra Singh Negi	Indian National Congress
2017	Dr. Harak Singh Rawat	Bharatiya Janata Party
2022	Ritu Khanduri Bhushan	Bharatiya Janata Party

== Election results ==
=== 2027 Assembly election ===
2027 Uttarakhand Legislative Assembly election: Kotdwar
Party	Candidate	Votes	%	±%
INC				
BJP				
NOTA	None of the above			
Majority				
Turnout				
gain from		Swing		

=== Assembly Election 2022 ===
2022 Uttarakhand Legislative Assembly election: Kotdwar
Party	Candidate	Votes	%	±%
BJP	Ritu Khanduri Bhushan	32,103	41.58	▼14.47
INC	Surendra Singh Negi	28,416	36.81	▼3.33
Independent	Dherandra Singh Chauhan	12,484	16.17	New
AAP	Arvind Kumar	1,975	2.56	New
BSP	Vikas Kumar	579	0.75	▼0.32
NOTA	None of the above	506	0.66	▲0.01
Margin of victory		3,687	4.78	▼11.14
Turnout		77,200	65.46	▼3.22
Registered electors		1,17,941		▲13.90
BJP hold		Swing	▼14.47	

=== Assembly Election 2017 ===
2017 Uttarakhand Legislative Assembly election: Kotdwar
Party	Candidate	Votes	%	±%
BJP	Dr. Harak Singh Rawat	39,859	56.06	▲12.45
INC	Surendra Singh Negi	28,541	40.14	▼10.89
BSP	Renu Agarwal	764	1.07	▼1.31
NOTA	None of the above	459	0.65	New
Margin of victory		11,318	15.92	▲8.50
Turnout		71,106	68.67	▼2.77
Registered electors		1,03,545		▲18.71
BJP gain from INC		Swing	▲5.03	

=== Assembly Election 2012 ===
2012 Uttarakhand Legislative Assembly election: Kotdwar
Party	Candidate	Votes	%	±%
INC	Surendra Singh Negi	31,797	51.03	▲6.40
BJP	Bhuwan Chandra Khanduri Avsm	27,174	43.61	▼2.56
BSP	Raje Singh	1,486	2.38	▼1.76
Independent	Sur Singh Gusain	583	0.94	New
URM	Gita Ram Sundriyal	337	0.54	New
Margin of victory		4,623	7.42	▲5.87
Turnout		62,315	71.44	▲10.60
Registered electors		87,222		
INC gain from BJP		Swing	▲4.86	

=== Assembly Election 2007 ===
2007 Uttarakhand Legislative Assembly election: Kotdwar
Party	Candidate	Votes	%	±%
BJP	Shailendra Singh Rawat	26,903	46.17	New
INC	Surendra Singh Negi	26,003	44.63	▼4.95
BSP	Dinesh Chandra Balodhi	2,417	4.15	▼5.80
UKD	Vipen Kotnala	882	1.51	▲0.34
Independent	Mahendra Singh	704	1.21	New
LJP	Surendra Singh	650	1.12	New
SP	Kuldeep Singh	471	0.81	▼0.45
Margin of victory		900	1.54	▼25.20
Turnout		58,268	61.00	▲7.73
Registered electors		95,762		
BJP gain from INC		Swing	▼3.40	

=== Assembly Election 2002 ===
2002 Uttaranchal Legislative Assembly election: Kotdwar
Party	Candidate	Votes	%	±%
INC	Surendra Singh Negi	20,087	49.57	New
Independent	Bhuwnesh Kharkwal	9,250	22.83	New
BSP	Shashikant	4,031	9.95	New
Uttarakhand Janwadi Party	Dherandra Singh Chauhan	1,886	4.65	New
Independent	Vijendra Kumar Chaudhari	814	2.01	New
Independent	Dilendra Kumar	510	1.26	New
SP	Anil Kumar Bhandari	509	1.26	New
Independent	Alok Singh	486	1.20	New
SAP	Jagmohan Prasad	476	1.17	New
UKD	Nandan Singh	474	1.17	New
Independent	Vishwa Pal	458	1.13	New
Margin of victory		10,837	26.74	
Turnout		40,520	53.20	
Registered electors		76,281		
INC win (new seat)				

== See also ==
- Tehri Garhwal (Lok Sabha constituency)
