= Ramadan Salim =

Libyan film critic and journalist

- Born: Ramadan Salim; 1953; Azizia, Libya
- Occupation(s): Writer, Journalist, Film critic
- Years active: 1981–present

Ramadan Salim (born 1953), is a Libyan writer, journalist, and film critic.

== Personal life ==
He was born in 1953 in Azizia, Libya.

== Career ==
He started career by writing about Libyan literature since 1979 particularly on Arabic culture, Magreb literature and Libyan cinema. In 1981, he wrote the non-fiction books on cinema The individual man in the circle of adventure and Cinema. After the success of the books, he authored another book The horizon and the reality in 1982. Then in 1997, he wrote the novel Journey and Discover, and then Critical Dimension in 2000.

Apart from author work, Salim worked as the chief editor of the monthly arts magazine Rainbow. Before that he worked as a journalist at the daily newspaper February as well as a film critic and reviewer for many Libyan newspapers and magazines. In 2012, he was appointed as the director of the International Mediterranean Film Festival for Documentary and Short Films, where the ceremony was held on 31 May 2012.
