= Bulldozer justice =

Use of bulldozers in Indian politics

Bulldozer justice (Note: Also referreed to as "bulldozer raj"; the word "bulldozer" itself has also become a part of the political lexicon of Uttar Pradesh and India in general.) is a term referring to the use of the bulldozer, an industrial machine, as a political tool and symbol in Indian politics, particularly in the politics of Uttar Pradesh, starting in 2017. This trend of bulldozer justice has seen heavy machinery being deployed to demolish houses of those who have protested and have been accused of rioting often without following process established by law. Houses, shops and small establishments have been bulldozed in India, disproportionately targeting illegal construction in the country. The bulldozer has become a symbol for Hindu nationalist politicians.

== Background ==
Bulldozer Justice began with the evoking of the machine by UP Chief Minister Yogi Adityanath of the BJP. While bulldozers are routinely used across India to remove illegal constructions, the bulldozer has been portrayed as a symbol of law enforcement in addressing property-related crimes, communal violence rioters and alleged criminal activity. Demolition of structures has been increasingly reported in states with BJP leadership as a measure against illegal constructions. Following its usage in political messaging in Uttar Pradesh, the bulldozer was used in Madhya Pradesh to convey political messages aimed at showing a strong stance against criminals.

Its rhetorical usage by Adityanath started following the commencement of his first term in office in March 2017. By 2020, property belonging to numerous criminals such as Vikas Dubey, as well as politician-strongmen and gangsters Mukhtar Ansari and Atique Ahmed had been demolished using bulldozers. The action against Dubey started after he and his associates killed eight policemen in July 2020 during an attempted arrest. The UP government committed to free up 67,000 acres (270 km^{2}) (Note: Uttar Pradesh is 243,286 square km) of government land and other illegally occupied land by land mafia, issuing certain directives related to the use of bulldozers and also warning of their misuse. Adityanath began his second term as chief minister in March 2022.

Similarly, the Chief Minister of Madhya Pradesh, another state with a BJP-based CM, began usage of the bulldozer in March 2022 against properties of the mafia, accused rapists and rioters. By late April 2022, bulldozers had also been used on the property of rioters in Delhi and Gujarat, with politics and legal issues ensuing, including over anti-encroachment drives in a BJP-held municipality in Rajasthan, an otherwise Congress-ruled state.

On 24 September 2022, Chief Minister Pushkar Singh Dhami publicly announced the demolition of the resort in which Ankita Bhandari worked at the time. Dhami described the act as 'Bulldozer Justice' against the accused in a twitter post. The demolition took place before Ankita's body was recovered and prompted concerns about the possible destruction of forensic evidence. Also inUttarakhand, rioters during Hanuman Jayanti processions were threatened with bulldozers parked in the vicinity of property owned by the accused.

Some media reports suggest that certain communities perceive the use of bulldozers as biased. In particular, properties belonging to and settlements primarily populated by Muslims have been disproportionately targeted. Critics also argue that giving up on the rule of law and adopting "bulldozer justice" is the initial move toward an authoritarian society. In such a society, the safety, life, and liberty of individuals would depend on the arbitrary decisions of state officials.

The number of displaced people rose from 107,625 in 2019 to 515,752 by 2023. In total, 153,820 houses were demolished by authorities in 2022 and 2023, leaving 738,438 people displaced. In September 2024, the Supreme Court ordered the governments to stop bulldozing homes.

== Course of events ==
=== Uttar Pradesh ===
==== Usage against criminals ====
Yogi Adityanath started his first term as the Chief Minister of Uttar Pradesh in March 2017. His first announcement was that his government would clean up the law and order situation in the state among other connected issues. An anti-mafia task force was set up and political messaging included statements such as "Leave UP or go to jail". It was in September 2017 when Yogi first warned that he would bulldoze properties of those involved in crime, "My government will bulldoze houses of anyone even thinking of perpetuating crime against women and weaker sections of the society", adding that it would take some more time to reel in other criminal elements. Uttar Pradesh police had already started taking action against criminals (Note: musclemen, strongmen, crime bosses, bahubalis, history-sheeters) with a number of them dying in police encounters.

By the end of 2020, properties had been demolished. (Note: With others being seized, confiscated, sealed.) In July 2020, history-sheeter and crime boss Vikas Dubey's house was demolished along with four vehicles. A few days eight policemen had been killed in an attempted arrest in which Dubey was the main accused. Vikas Dubey would go on to die in an encounter after the police vehicle carrying him met with an accident. In August 2020, Mukhtar Ansari, a criminal turned politician, connected properties were razed. A government spokesperson explained that the property had been constructed on the property of migrants in Pakistan. Ansari's sons' property was razed. This involved 250 policemen and 20 bulldozers. Part of a hotel he owned was demolished following a decision taken by an administrative board including the district magistrate. In September 2020, properties connected to Atique Ahmed were demolished. This includes Mohamed Zaid's two-story house built in 2015 over 600 square yards. 6 bulldozers took 5 hours. The reason given for demolishing the building was that the blueprints of the building were not cleared by local authorities before construction. A number of other structures, illegal constructions, or belonging to known gangsters were also raised. This number increased by the end of 2021. In February 2021, Yogi stated that 67,000 acres (270 km^{2}) of land had been freed from mafia control. Yogi said that the illegal properties that are being seized and bulldozed will be replaced by new houses for the Dalits and the poor, playgrounds and other social needs, and warned the mafia of harassing the poor, farmers and traders. Public response within Uttar Pradesh in relation to the use of the bulldozer has been mixed. The Yogi government has also warned about the misuse of bulldozers.

==== Elections ====
We have a special machine which we are using for building expressways and highways. At the same time, we are using it to crush the mafia who exploited people to build their properties.

— Yogi Adityanath, during state election campaigns, 2022

Yogi Adityanath went on to use the bulldozer in his election campaign for the 2022 Uttar Pradesh Legislative Assembly election held between 10 February and 7 March 2022. This earned him the tag "bulldozer baba". The term had initially been used as a taunt by an opposition party. In some rallies, Yogi also mentioned: "bulldozers taking rest".

=== Madhya Pradesh ===
Shivraj Singh Chauhan, the chief minister of Madhya Pradesh, another state with a BJP CM, went on to use the bulldozer similarly as seen in Uttar Pradesh. By 19 March, CM Chauhan had ordered the use of the bulldozer against the property of the mafia as well as against gang rape, rioting and kidnapping accused in Seoni, Sheopur, Jaora, Shahdol and Raisen. The Shahdol rape incident took place on 16 March and the house of the accused was demolished on 22 March. This was following an investigation by the chief municipality officer who found a number of illegalities in the construction of the house. Following clashes on Holi in Khamriya village of Raisen, the administration used bulldozers to demolish encroachments of accused rioters. Many of the alleged perps were of a "particular community". Similarly to the tag given to Yogi "bulldozer baba", banners were seen in Bhopal with "bulldozer mama" (Note: Mama is maternal uncle, bulldozer mama can be translated as uncle with the bulldozer.) written and an image of CM Chauhan and a bulldozer in the background.

Following a rape incident on 28 March in a government guesthouse in Rewa, CM Chauhan ordered a bulldozer to be used against the house of the accused, a Mahant. Following clashes in Khargone on 10 April 2022, Ram Navami, 16 houses and 29 shops were demolished by Chouhan's government. Some of the demolished buildings were constructed under the government housing initiative Pradhan Mantri Awas Yojana.

Ram Navami and Hanuman Jayanti violence in April 2022
10 April	**Khargone**, MP; Howrah and Bankura, WB
11 April	**Khambat**, GJ; Lohardaga, JH; Baina, Vasco, GA
16 April	**Jahangirpuri**, DL; Hubli, KA; Bhagwanpur, Roorkee, UK
17 April	Holagunda, Kurnool, AP
18 April	Amravati, MH
In **Bold** are locations where bulldozers were used in response. In Italics a threat to use bulldozers was seen.

=== Karnataka and Uttarakhand ===
On 16 April, localized riots took place in Hubli, Karnataka. Following violence, there were calls in the state demanding a "bulldozer" form of justice. On the same day, violence was also seen in Uttarakhand's Bhagwanpur region. In the following days, bulldozers were seen in proximity to properties of the riot accused.

=== Delhi ===
On 20 April, following communal violence in Delhi's Jahangirpuri, local authorities issued the demolition of certain structures in an eviction and anti-encroachment drive. The Supreme Court of India intervened to stop the demolition. Supposedly the Supreme Court had to give the orders twice as demolition continued for around an hour after the first order. Street carts were also destroyed with bulldozers. Residents said that even registered buildings were damaged. Nine bulldozers were seen in the area and 20 structures were destroyed. A political blame game ensued.

=== Rajasthan ===
On 22 April, bulldozers were seen demolishing some shops and three temples in Alwar, Rajasthan, a Congress-led state but in the BJP-held municipality of Rajgarh. Local administration said that consensus had been achieved in the destruction of the shrines, including one which had been built on a drain, and that it was part of an anti-encroachment drive and the shrines would be rebuilt on "non-controversial land". During another anti-encroachment drive the next day, a gaushala was part of the removed structures and cleared land.

== Legal issues ==
=== On Jahangirpuri ===
Tushar Mehta, on behalf of North Delhi Municipal Corporation, stated that the Delhi Municipal Corporation Act provides for the removal of "stall, chair, bench, box, ladder, bale" without notice. Just as Ganesh Gupta's juice shop was removed without notice, everything on public land was removed. In the case of buildings, notices were given. Further, the law provides some days and appellate remedy in the case of building as per the Act. As "houses and other permanent structures were targeted" Advocate Dushyant Dave raised this as a primary point before the court.

== Reactions ==
Farm leader and national spokesperson of the Bharatiya Kisan Union (BKU) Rakesh Tikait warned the government that if the unjust use of bulldozers doesn't stop, tractors will be used by farmers to stop them. Opposition leaders in response also stated the headquarters of the BJP should be demolished and that it was the BJP who allowed illegal constructions in Delhi in areas they had held for years. Akhilesh Yadav said that BJP should make the bulldozer its emblem and that it was distracting the Chief Minister from more important governance matters. Manish Sisodia said that the bulldozer was being used as a tool of extortion. Names such as "Bulldozernath" or "the lord of bulldozers" were used. The bulldozer was connected to bulldozing the "dreams of the youth" and being "anti-women". Jamiat Ulama-e-Hind filed two petitions in the Supreme Court of India. On 24 April 2022, Aam Aadmi Party conducted "foot marches" in all the wards of Delhi. Brinda Karat, an Indian politician, has claimed that BJP aims to vilify Muslims through these actions.

Newslaundry, an Indian media watchdog, reported on the response of sections of the Indian media and their coverage of the events and how certain anchors supported the proceedings. Anjana Om Kashyap, a media professional, climbed on board the bulldozers at the Jahangirpuri site and started asking the drivers questions. During one of the demolitions in Uttar Pradesh, a district magistrate (an Indian Administrative Service officer) clicked a selfie, and shared it with the caption "Yeh Hum Hai, Yeh Humaari Car Hai Aur Hamaari Party Ho Rahi Hai" (Note: A meme that had become a trend in 2021.) (transl. This is us, this is our car, our party is happening here).

== Commentary ==
The timing of the Jahangirpuri demolitions, four days after communal clashes in the same area, "reads extremely suspicious", says political commentator N. S. Moorthy. The Supreme Court's status quo intervention brought immediate relief. However, this order does not seem to make the judiciary the answer to the larger overarching questions related to the perceived targeting of sections of the population, more than what is already being seen.

== Supreme Court judgement ==
Multiple pleas were filed from time to time by different NGOs opposing the bulldozer justice. They were all clubbed together by the Supreme Court. In November 2024, the directions were issued by the Supreme Court of India which outlawed bulldozer justice as a tool of punishment for accused or guilty people.

The Supreme Court of India issued the following directions to curb bulldozer justice.

	Directions	Reference
1	If order of demolition is passed then time has to be given to appeal this order.	Detailed-judgement
2	No demolition is permissible without show cause notice. The notice is to be sent by registered post to the building owner and pasted outside the structure that is proposed to be demolished. At least 15 days from the date of notice must be given before any further demolition action is taken.	Detailed-judgement
3	The notice shall contain details of the nature of violations that led the authorities to propose demolition, the date on which a personal hearing for the affected party is fixed, and before whom (which authority) it is fixed. It should also include the list of documents that the noticee has to furnish when making a reply.	Detailed-judgement
4	To prevent any allegation of backdating such notices, as soon as the show cause notice is served, intimation of the same shall be sent to the Collector/District Magistrate (DM) of the district by email and an auto-generated reply acknowledging receipt of the mail should also be issued from the office of the Collector/DM. The Collector and DM are to appoint nodal officers and assign an email address for this purpose. This email is to be communicated to all municipal and other authorities in charge of building regulations and demolition within one month from today.	Detailed-judgement
5	A designated digital portal is to be provided within three months from the date of the order where details of such notices, replies and the order eventually passed is made available.	Detailed-judgement
6	The designated authority shall give an opportunity of personal hearing to the person affected and the minutes of such hearing shall be recorded.	Detailed-judgement
7	Once a final order is passed thereafter, it should answer if the offense of constructing the unauthorized structure is compoundable. If only a part of the structure construction is found illegal/ non-compoundable, it has to be examined why the extreme step of demolition is the only answer. Orders so passed (on determining whether demolition is required) shall be displayed on the digital portal.	Detailed-judgement
8	Opportunity must be given to the owner to demolish or remove the unauthorized structure within 15 days of the order. Steps to demolish the property can only be taken after these 15 days have elapsed without the person removing the illegal structure and if no appellate body has stayed the demolition. Only construction found to be unauthorized and not compoundable shall be demolished.	Detailed-judgement
9	Before demolition, a detailed inspection report shall be prepared by the concerned authority signed by two Panchas (witnesses).	Detailed-judgement
10	Demolition proceedings are to be videographed. The video recording is to be preserved. A demolition report, recording which officials/ police officers/ civil personnel participated in the demolition proceedings, is to be prepared and forwarded to the concerned municipal commissioner. This report is also to be displayed on the digital portal.	Detailed-judgement

The Supreme Court also warned that if these directions are flouted, the officials responsible will be liable for contempt of Court and prosecution. Such officers shall be held liable to restitute the demolished property at their own cost and also pay compensation. The Court further made it clear that these directions will not be applicable if there is an unauthorized structure in any public place such as road, street, footpath, abutting railway line or any river body or water bodies and also to cases where there is an order for demolition made by a Court of law.

== See also ==
- Israeli demolition of Palestinian property
- Uttar Pradesh Recovery of Damages to Public and Private Property Ordinance, 2020
- 2022 Jahangirpuri violence
- Ram Navami riots
- Illegal housing in India
- Turkman gate demolition and rioting
