= Ritu Khanduri Bhushan =

Indian politician

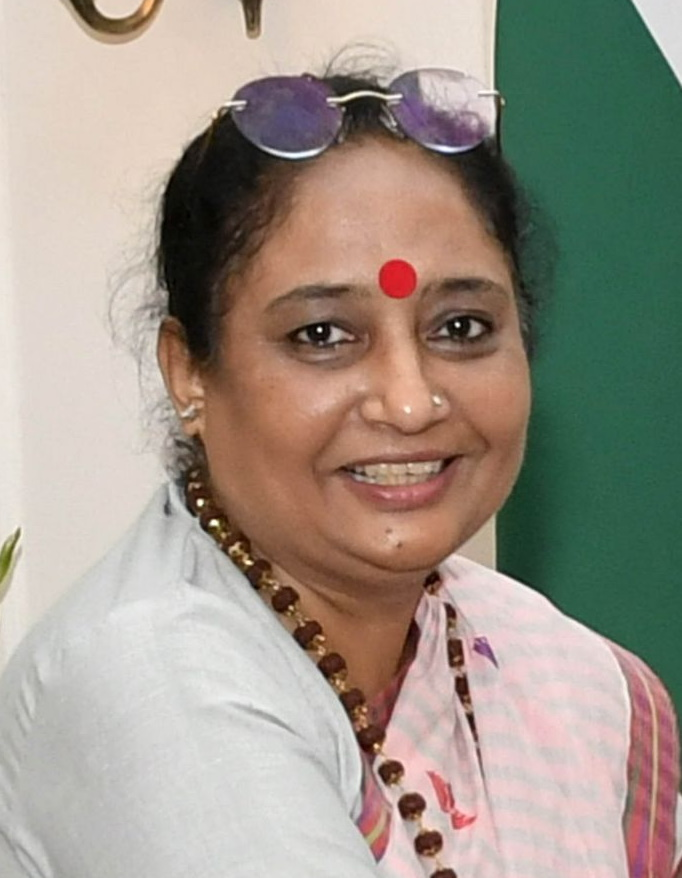
- Ritu Khanduri Bhushan in 2022

6th Speaker of the Uttarakhand Legislative Assembly
- Incumbent
- Assumed office 26 March 2022
- CM: Pushkar Dhami
- Preceded by: Premchand Aggarwal
- Constituency: Kotdwar

Member of the Uttarakhand Legislative Assembly
- Incumbent
- Assumed office 10 March 2022
- Preceded by: Harak Singh Rawat
- Constituency: Kotdwar
- In office 11 March 2017 – 10 March 2022
- Preceded by: Vijaya Barthwal
- Succeeded by: Renu Bisht
- Constituency: Yamkeshwar

Personal details
- Born: 29 January 1965 (age 61) Nainital
- Party: BJP
- Spouse: Rajesh Bhushan
- Parent: B. C. Khanduri (Former Chief Minister of Uttarakhand) (father)
- Profession: Politician

Ritu Khanduri Bhushan (born 29 January 1965) is an Indian politician from Uttarakhand. She is the 6th and first woman Speaker of the Uttarakhand Legislative Assembly and represents the Kotdwar constituency. She is a member of the Bharatiya Janata Party and the daughter of B. C. Khanduri, former Chief Minister of Uttarakhand.

== Early life and education ==
Ritu Khanduri was born in Nainital in 1965. She belongs to a politically influential family in Uttarakhand, her father being B. C. Khanduri. She pursued higher education and has been active in social and community service before entering active politics.

== Political career ==
Ritu Khanduri Bhushan began her political career with the Bharatiya Janata Party and contested the 2017 Uttarakhand Legislative Assembly election from Yamkeshwar, winning the seat and serving in the 4th Uttarakhand Legislative Assembly.

In the 2022 Uttarakhand Legislative Assembly election, she contested from Kotdwar and won with 41.58% of the votes, defeating Surendra Singh Negi of the Indian National Congress. She was subsequently elected as the Speaker of the Uttarakhand Legislative Assembly, becoming the first woman to hold this position.

=== Committees ===
- Member, Committee on Information and Technology (2017–2022)
- Speaker, Uttarakhand Legislative Assembly (2022–present)

== Electoral performance ==
| Election | Constituency | Party | Result | Votes % | Opposition Candidate | Opposition Party | Opposition vote % | | |
|---|---|---|---|---|---|---|---|---|---|
| 2022 | Kotdwar | | BJP | Won | 41.58% | Surendra Singh Negi | | INC | 36.81% |
| 2017 | Yamkeshwar | | BJP | Won | 42.62% | Renu Bisht | | Independent | 23.16% |

== Personal life ==
Ritu Khanduri is married to Rajesh Bhushan, a retired civil servant. She continues to reside in Dehradun, Uttarakhand.

== See also ==
- Uttarakhand Legislative Assembly
- List of chief ministers of Uttarakhand
- Bharatiya Janata Party
