= Murder of Kiran Negi =

2012 rape and murder of girl in Delhi, India

Kidnapping of Kiran Negi
- Location: Qutub Vihar, Phase II, Dwarka, Southwest Delhi, India. Body found in Rodhai, Rewari district, Haryana, India.
- Date: 9 February 2012
- Attack type: Kidnapping, Rape, Murder
- Weapons: Jack and spanner (allegedly used for murder)
- Deaths: 1
- Victim: Kiran Negi
- Perpetrators: Rahul, Ravi, Vinod
- Accused: Rahul, Ravi, Vinod
- Verdict: Acquitted by Supreme Court of India
- Convicted: Convicted in lower courts and High Court, but acquitted by Supreme Court of India
- Litigation: Supreme Court of India
- Procedural lapses by police and prosecution led to acquittal; DNA evidence deemed unreliable by the court.

Kiran Negi (1993 — 2012) was a 19-year old Indian woman and resident of Qutub Vihar in Dwarka, southwest Delhi, India. She was returning home from work with two other girls when she was kidnapped by three people in a red Tata Indica car in Phase II Qutub Vihar on 9 February 2012. Vikas Rawat tried to intervene but was outnumbered. Rahul (26), Ravi (22), and Vinod (22), were arrested four days later and the body of Kiran Negi was found in a mustard field about 30 km away in Rodhai, a village in Rewari district, Haryana. The police claimed to have solved the case with confessions from the accused and findings of investigation including DNA evidence but the accused were acquitted by the court which deemed the evidence to be unreliable.

== Investigation ==
The investigation conducted by the police revealed that accused Rahul was apprehended with a red Indica car four days after the kidnapping. He confessed in police custody that he, along with his brother Ravi and Vinod, had kidnapped a girl from Qutub Vihar, committed rape on her, killed her, and threw her dead body in the fields ahead of Jhajjar. The police confiscated the car, mobile phones of the accused, and found the body of the girl in village Rodai of Rewari, Haryana. The police also recovered some hair strands from the body of the deceased, as well as two plastic glasses, one empty pouch of snacks, piece of earthenware pot, a broken piece of a red-coloured plastic bumper(of the car), and one wallet near the dead body. At the instance of the accused, mobile phone and undergarment of the victim, along with her other burnt personal articles, were also found. The police found jack and spanner in the car, which were supposedly used for murdering the girl. Hair strands of the victim were also found in the car along with semen on the seats.

== Verdicts ==
However, procedural lapses by the police and prosecution ensured that the accused were acquitted in the case. Although the accused were convicted in lower courts and High Court, the Supreme Court of India picked apart all the circumstantial evidence and found that the evidence was not conclusive. None of the witnesses could identify the accused in court, and the Test Identification parade (Police lineup) was not done by any of the investigating officers before filing the chargesheet. The constables who arrested the accused were not examined by the prosecution, and there were conflicting versions on who among the police reached the site of the body first. Confessions by the accused before police were not accepted as evidence, except in the part where it leads to recovery of any incriminating material. Thus, the wallet found was said to contain documents of accused Rahul, but witnesses did not mention any such documents, implying evidence planting by the police. The hair found on the body was suspected to have been put there later, as loose hair would not be on the body for 3 days. The date of death according to the post-mortem was between 10 February 2012, and 11 February 2012, while the prosecution claimed it to be the night of 9 February 2012, and 10 February 2012. As the chain of custody of the car was not clear between seizure and sending to the laboratory, the hair and semen found there also became suspect as being a plant by police. Further, the DNA test itself is not a reliable evidence according to the court. The parents of the victim were shocked at this judgment. A review petition in the case was also dismissed by the court.

== See also ==
- Murder of Ankita Bhandari
