= Rajesh Bhushan =

Indian civil servant

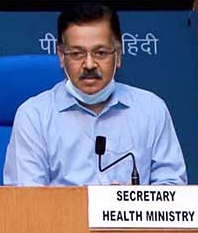

Secretary (Health)
- In office April 2020 – July 2023
- Preceded by: Preeti Sudan
- Succeeded by: Sudhansh Pant

Secretary (Security)
- In office 1 November 2019 – 31 December 2019
- Preceded by: S. K. Sinha
- Succeeded by: V. P. Joy

Personal details
- Born: 31 July 1963 (age 62)
- Citizenship: Indian
- Spouse: Ritu Khanduri Bhushan
- Occupation: Retd. IAS officer

Rajesh Bhushan (born 31 July 1963) is a retired officer of the Indian Administrative Service from the 1987 Bihar cadre.

== Education ==
Bhushan studied history and received a master's degree.

== Career ==
Bhushan joined the Indian Administrative Service in 1987.

In July 2020, Bhushan accepted an appointment as the Secretary of the Ministry of Health and Family Welfare. He presided over the functioning of the Ministry immediately after the first COVID-19 wave in India and during the entire period spanning up to and during the devastating second wave as well. Previously, in the same Ministry, He retired in July 2023. the month of

In November 2019, he accepted an appointment as Secretary of the Special Protection Group.

Previously, Bhushan was also Secretary in the Ministry of Rural Development.

== Further consideration ==
- Telangana State Institute of Rural Development (1 October 2012). "National Retreat for BNVs - Shri Rajesh Bhushan, Joint Secretary, MoRD, GoI". YouTube. Telangana State Institute of Rural Development.
