= Kotdwar Municipal Corporation =

Civic body that governs the city of Kotdwar in Uttarakhand, India

Kotdwar Municipal Corporation कोटद्वार नगर निगम Kotdwar Nagar Nigam
- Unicameral Legislature

Type
- Type: Municipal Corporation

Leadership
- Mayor: Shailendra Singh Rawat, BJP since 7 February 2025
- Municipal Commissioner: P L Shah, PCS

Structure
- Political groups: Government (31): BJP (18); IND (13); Opposition (9): INC (9)

Elections
- Voting system: First-past-the-post
- Last election: 23 January 2025
- Next election: 2030

Meeting place
- Nagar Nigam Bhavan, Kotdwar

Website
- Nagar Nigam Kotdwar

The Kotdwar Municipal Corporation is the civic body that governs the city of Kotdwar in Uttarakhand, India.

== Structure ==
This corporation consists of 40 wards and is headed by a mayor who presides over a deputy mayor and 39 other corporators representing the wards. The mayor is elected directly through a first-past-the-post voting system and the deputy mayor is elected by the corporators from among their numbers.

== List of mayors ==
S. No.	Name	Term			Party
1	Hemlata Negi	2 December 2018	3 December 2023	5 years, 1 day	Indian National Congress
Administrator		3 December 2023	7 February 2025	1 year, 67 days	Government of Uttarakhand
2	Shailendra Singh Rawat	7 February 2025	Incumbent	1 year, 113 days	Bharatiya Janata Party

== Current members ==
Kotdwar Municipal Corporation has a total of 40 members or corporators, who are directly elected after a term of 5 years. The council is led by the Mayor. The latest elections were held in 23 January 2025. The current mayor of Kotdwar is Shailendra Singh Rawat of the Bharatiya Janata Party.

Mayor: Shailendra Singh Rawat
Ward No	Ward Name	Name of Corporator	Party	Remarks
1	Ratanpur Saneh	Jay Prakash Dhyani	Bharatiya Janata Party	
2	Kumbhichaud	Anil Rawat	Bharatiya Janata Party	
3	Saneh	Sanjay Bhandari	Bharatiya Janata Party	
4	Gadighat	Himanshu Verma	Independent	
5	Lakdipadav	Naeem Ahmed	Indian National Congress	
6	Kashirampur Talla	Suraj Prasad Kanti	Independent	
7	Kaudia	Subhash Pandey	Bharatiya Janata Party	
8	Govindnagar	Jaideep	Independent	
9	Kashirampur Malla	Pravendra Singh	Bharatiya Janata Party	
10	Paniali Talli	Nazmeen	Indian National Congress	
11	Jhandachowk Badrinath Marg	Vipin Dobriyal	Indian National Congress	
12	Kalabad	Arti Kharakwal	Independent	
13	Adhat Bazaar Christian Colony	Rizwana Parveen	Bharatiya Janata Party	
14	Jaunpur	Rita Devi	Independent	
15	Govind Nagar Nayagaon	Kavita Mittal	Indian National Congress	
16	Sitabpur	Rajni Devi	Independent	
17	Manpur	Kiran Kala	Bharatiya Janata Party	
18	Shivpur	Jyoti	Bharatiya Janata Party	
19	Lalpur	Netramohan Aswal	Independent	
20	Padampur Sukhrao-2	Prema	Bharatiya Janata Party	
21	Padampur Sukhrao-1	Beena Devi	Indian National Congress	
22	Simalchaud	Manoj Shah	Independent	
23	Shibbunagar	Sonia Negi	Indian National Congress	
24	Balasaud	Neeruwala Khatwal	Bharatiya Janata Party	
25	Ratanpur Sukhrao	Ritu Chamoli	Bharatiya Janata Party	
26	Balbhadrapur	Umed Singh Negi	Bharatiya Janata Party	
27	Durgapur	Shridar Prasad	Indian National Congress	
28	Nimbuchaud	Pramod Kumar	Bharatiya Janata Party	
29	Ghamandpur	Amit Negi	Bharatiya Janata Party	
30	Nandpur	Shashikant Joshi	Bharatiya Janata Party	
31	Padampur Motadhak	Saurabh Naudiyal	Bharatiya Janata Party	
32	Shivrajpur	Deepak Pathak	Independent	
33	Haldukhata Malla	Jagdish Prasad	Independent	
34	Udayrampur Nayavad	Vivek	Indian National Congress	
35	Trilokpur	Bheem Singh	Independent	
36	Lokmanipur	Rajendra Singh	Bharatiya Janata Party	
37	Jhandichaud West	Sukhpal Shah	Independent	
38	Jhandichaud North	Rajnish Bebni	Bharatiya Janata Party	
39	Jhandichaud East	Seeta Devi	Indian National Congress	
40	Jashodharpur	Manish	Independent	

== Election results ==
The Kotdwar Municipal Corporation holds direct elections every five years in the state and the latest elections were those held in the year 2025.

=== Mayoral ===
Year	No. of Wards	Winner				Runner Up				Margin
Year	No. of Wards	Party	Candidate	Votes	%	Party	Candidate	Votes	%	Margin
2025	40	Bharatiya Janata Party	Shailendra Singh Rawat	38,175	52.25	INC	Ranjana Rawat	23,944	32.77	14,231

=== Ward-wise ===
==== 2025 ====
Kotdwar Municipal Corporation
Party	Won	+/−
Bharatiya Janata Party	18	▲6
Independents	13	▼2
Indian National Congress	9	▼4
Total	40	

== See also ==
- 2025 Kotdwar Municipal Corporation election
