= Hemlata Negi =

Indian politician

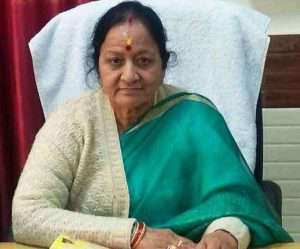

Mayor Kotdwar Municipal Corporation
- In office 2 December 2018 – 3 December 2023
- Preceded by: Post established
- Succeeded by: Shailendra Singh Rawat

Personal details
- Party: Indian National Congress
- Spouse: Surendra Singh Negi

Hemlata Negi is an Indian politician from Uttarakhand. She is a member of the Indian National Congress. She formerly served as the mayor of Kotdwar.
