= Murder of Ankita Bhandari =

2022 murder near Rishikesh, Uttarakhand, India

Ankita Bhandari
- Born: 11 November 2003; Pauri, Uttarakhand, India
- Died: 18 September 2022 (aged 18); Rishikesh, Uttarakhand, India
- Cause of death: Murder (drowning)
- Body discovered: 24 September 2022; Chilla Canal, Rishikesh, India
- Occupation: Hotel receptionist
- Known for: Murder victim

Ankita Bhandari (11 November 2003 – 18 September 2022) was an Indian receptionist from Pauri who was murdered at the Vanantra Resort by its owner, Pulkit Arya, the son of senior Bharatiya Janata Party (BJP) leader Vinod Arya, in Ganga-Bhogpur in Rishikesh, Uttarakhand.

Member of the Legislative Assembly (MLA) Renu Bisht, also a member of the BJP, has been accused of attempting to destroy evidence by ordering an unlawful demolition of the resort after the murder.

The case gained much publicity in national and state media due to the use of political power in an attempt at rape by coercion. This theory is supported by statements of the victim's mother, though the evidence presented in the charge sheet were deemed insufficient. According to the witness statement of a hotel staffer, she was raped.. However, subsequent forensic examinations explicitly ruled out rape.

Three main accused which included Pulkit Arya, the assistant resort manager, Ankit Gupta, and the resort manager, Saurabh Bhaskar, have confessed to the murder and were sentenced on charges of abduction and murder. A district court in Kotdwar convicted Arya, Gupta, and Bhaskar for the murder of Bhandari on 30 May 2025, with the verdict being delivered by Judge Reena Negi.

== Background ==
Bhandari was born in the village of Dobh-Srikot, district Pauri, Uttarakhand. In 2021, Bhandari enrolled in a certificate course at Dehradun's Shri Ram Institute of Hotel Management. However, her father, Virendra Bhandari, soon lost his job as a security guard, forcing her to drop out of the one-year course. She started her first job at the Vanantra Resort post-lockdown in Rishikesh as a receptionist on 28 August 2022 and was promised ₹10,000 as monthly salary. She was last seen by her father on the day of her joining, 18 days prior to her murder.

Bhandari lodged within the resort premises with permission from owner Pulkit Arya due to the resort's relatively remote location. According to her WhatsApp chats, she was shifted to a downstairs room on 17 September, the day before her murder, with the accused informing her that other neighboring rooms would be given to guests.

An account of a hotel staffer, Abhinav, indicates that Bhandari was sexually assaulted in the room on 18 September 2022. Abhinav claims he saw Arya physically covering Bhandari's mouth to prevent her from speaking over the phone to someone, and that she was crying for help. After this, Arya was allegedly in Bhandari's room for an hour behind closed doors.

== Murder ==
On 20 September 2022, Twitter posts reported calls and attempts to locate Bhandari had been unsuccessful since the evening of 18 September. The posts’ author and Bhandari’s friend, Pushap Deep, voiced suspicions of involvement by three of Bhandari’s employers due to her claims of ongoing harassment from them. According to the posts, Bhandari disclosed being repeatedly pressured to provide “extra services” to a guest. Deep indicated that the last time he spoke with Bhandari, she was being “lured outside” to meet with the three men who had been troubling her.

WhatsApp messages from Bhandari recounted how she’d scolded Arya after he allegedly attempted to kiss her. She had also been “forcefully hugged” by a drunk guest but was pressured to stay silent by Arya’s assistant, Ankit Gupta, “to avoid an escalation of the issue”. Another message from Bhandari stated Gupta asked her if she “was ready to give ‘extra services’ to a guest who was willing to pay.” Bhandari declared she’d “bluntly told him that I may be poor, but I won’t sell myself for ₹10,000 to your resort.” The messages went on further to recount how Gupta claimed he wasn’t requesting her involvement, only asking her to tell him if she “knew of any other girl who might be willing.” However, Bhandari’s texts continued, “I knew he had directed that offer towards me only, thinking I might agree after learning of the amount (sic).” Another message reported that Ankit was directed by Arya to threaten Bhandari with being terminated from her position and replaced if she wouldn’t “agree to give special services to guests.” She would go on to say, “I won’t work at the resort anymore if Ankit brings this up once again. These people want me to be become a prostitute.”

According to the three convicted, Arya had a heated conversation with Bhandari about an unspecified topic. The three men, along with Bhandari, then went to a different location to resolve things. However, on their way, the men had an altercation with Bhandari, after which they pushed her into the Chilla canal. They then returned to the hotel and told a different story to their staff.

Bhandari's father attempted to register a missing person complaint. He visited three police stations in the next 12 hours – Pauri police station, Muni Ki Reti police station, and Kotwali police station at Rishikesh – but his first information report (FIR) was not lodged, citing grounds of jurisdiction, despite Zero FIR policies. He was told to go to the revenue police.

Meanwhile, Arya had informed revenue police officer Vaibhav Pratap of Bhandari's disappearance on 19 September. Pratap, however, went on leave without initiating any action.

Bhandari's body was recovered by the State Disaster Response Force of the Uttarakhand police on 24 September 2022 from the Chilla canal's barrage.

== Investigation ==
Singh, upset with the police force's actions, reached out to several authorities in Dehradun, including the chairperson of the state's women's commission, Vidhan Sabha speaker, the Director General of Police (DGP), and local news portals like Jago Uttarakhand. Only after these bodies had highlighted Bhandari's disappearance was the report transferred to the regular police from the revenue police on the evening of 22 September, and an investigation began.

On 23 September, the room in which Bhandari lived at Vanantra was bulldozed by the sitting MLA of the area, Renu Bisht (who also runs a resort in the same area). On 24 September, a fire broke out on the premises despite the resort being sealed by the police. Initially, it was cited as extrajudicial bulldozer justice by Chief Minister Pushkar Singh Dhami on a Twitter Post. But later, the DM denied government involvement in the matter.

Later, the case was transferred to the Laxman Jhula police, who managed to arrest the three men accused in the case. During the police interrogation, the three confessed to killing Bhandari.

Bhandari's autopsy was performed by the All India Institute of Medical Sciences, Rishikesh. Their preliminary report said that she sustained certain injuries suggestive of blunt force trauma before her death, and that her cause of death was drowning. Bhandari's family was not satisfied with the postmortem report and refused to perform her last rites until the final autopsy report was released by the police to the public.

Appeals from the local administration and the Chief Minister of Uttrakhand Pushkar Singh Dhami were made in which he called the incident 'unfortunate'. Dhami assured the family that the trial would be held in a fast-track court and the strictest punishment would be given to the accused. Singh, however, alleges that he was put under undue pressure from the administration, and Bhandari's mother was forcibly hospitalised to prevent consultation. The body was cremated without letting Bhandari's mother see her for the last time.

On 25 September 2022, Bhandari's last rites were performed by her family members at the NIT ghat of Srinagar. There was the presence of a large number of people at the funeral ground. Many leading politicians from the state, including Tirath Singh Rawat, a sitting Member of Parliament and former Chief Minister of Uttarakhand, and Rajendra Bhandari, Congress MLA from Badrinath, expressed grief.

However, groups of locals on social media and the father of the victim moved the High Court to ensure a probe by the CBI. In December 2022, the police filed a 500-page charge sheet against the three accused. In May 2023, it was alleged by the parents and some social workers that Bhandari was raped before her murder by Bhaskar. However, post-mortem forensic examinations contradict this, and explicitly rule out sexual assault.

A special investigative team (SIT) was formed by the police to investigate the case. Under arrest by the SIT, the three accused were charged with murder, kidnapping or abducting with intent secretly and wrongfully to confine a person, and causing disappearance of evidence of offense or giving false information to screen the offender.

In March 2023, Arya was booked for murder, molestation, and immoral trafficking along with molestation, while Bhaskar and Gupta were charged for murder and hiding the evidence.

== Demolition of Vanantra Resort ==
On 24 September 2022, Chief Minister Pushkar Singh Dhami publicly announced the demolition of Vanantara Resort, describing it as an act of 'Bulldozer Justice' in a twitter post. The demolition took place before Ankita's body was recovered and prompted concerns about the possible destruction of forensic evidence.

In December 2023, while testifying in the court, JCB driver Deepak said that he had operated a JCB to bulldoze Vanantra Resort on the instructions of the then Sub-Collector and Bharatiya Janata Party (BJP) MLA, Renu Bisht, to destroy evidence.

Deepak claims he was called twice on 23 September 2022 to raze parts of the Vanantra Resort. The first time the demolition was carried out under the then sub-divisional magistrate Renu Bisht. He claimed that on the instructions of the SDM and in the presence of other officials, he razed the gate and the boundary wall of the resort, and then left for Haridwar.

Deepak claims the personal assistant of Yamkeshwar MLA Renu Bisht called him soon after and asked him to reach the resort with the JCB where he broke the walls and windows of two rooms. He claimed that the MLA had made him stay in an adjacent room in the resort that night.

== Related individuals ==
On 24 September, the Bhartiya Janta Party, facing public outrage expelled Vinod Arya, and his son Ankit Arya, Vice President of Uttarakhand OBC Commission, after Pulkit Arya confessed to killing Bhandari.

Despite witness testimonials of BJP leader Renu Bisht's involvement in the destruction of evidence in the Vanantra Resort, she maintains her position within the party as MLA from Yamkeshwar Assembly.

Vaibhav Pratap Singh, the patwari, was later suspended for failing to file an FIR (first information report) in response to Bhandari's complaint that his daughter was missing. Later, he was arrested by the SIT formed by CM Pushkar Singh Dham.

In late December, actor Urmila Sanawar, who claimed to be the second wife of former BJP MLA Suresh Rathore, had released videos and an audio recording linking BJP leader Dushyant Kumar Gautam as the VIP who wanted the "special services". Gautam filed a defamation petition against Sanawar and Rathore, as well as the Congress, Aam Aadmi Party, and various X users, for falsely linking him to the murder.

== Arrest of journalist Ashutosh Negi ==
A writ petition filed in the Uttarakhand High Court by journalist Ashutosh Negi, an independent journalist and Jago Uttarakhand editor, had pleaded for a CBI investigation. In the writ petition, they had raised doubts about the SIT investigation being biased, pointing to the failure to recover the CCTV footage and phone of the accused Arya, and asked for protection for Negi and the key witnesses in the case, because of threats received. However, the court in its order of 21 December dismissed this plea.

From this point forth, Negi was involved in the active coverage of the case and its aftermath. Negi gained a subdued reputation within the state for consistently attempting to secure justice for Bhandari's case, having proved himself a vocal critic of the so far unsuccessful investigative forces.

On 5 March 2024, Uttarakhand Police arrested Negi, based on a complaint lodged by a Pauri Garhwal resident under Sections of the SC/ST (Prevention of Atrocities) Act. Uttarakhand DGP Abhinav Kumar from Kotdwar in a statement to the press: "The intentions of so-called social activists like Ashutosh Negi are suspected. Their agenda does not align with seeking justice for our daughter but rather aims to sow anarchy and discord in society. We are also investigating Negi's activities, which appear to be part of a conspiracy, and strict action will be taken if we find any evidence."

== Conviction of Pulkit Arya ==
On 30 May 2025, the Additional District and Sessions Judge Court in Kotdwar, Uttarakhand, convicted Pulkit Arya, Saurabh Bhaskar, and Ankit Gupta for the murder of Ankita Bhandari. The court found them guilty under Indian Penal Code Sections 302 (murder), 354 (assault or criminal force to woman with intent to outrage her modesty), and 120B (criminal conspiracy).

The prosecution presented a 500-page charge sheet and examined 47 witnesses during the trial. The case garnered widespread attention due to the political connections of the main accused and led to public outcry across Uttarakhand. Bhandari's mother has publicly demanded the death penalty for the convicts. Sentencing is pending.

== Social impact ==
Bhandari's murder sparked a general unrest among the people of Uttarakhand. The state has had a historically high-trust society in the hilly regions along with a low violent crime rate overall had built a perception of a safe environment for women in public spaces. The murder propelled increasing worries about rising crime rate in the state.

In 2018, the Trivendra Singh Rawat-led BJP government relaxed restrictions on people from outside Uttarakhand from buying agricultural land in the state for industrial purposes. The policy was lauded for attracting investments into the state, but many link the move to an unchecked influx of non-natives leading to an increase in crime, sparking resentment on the ground.

Bhandari's murder strengthened anti-outsider sentiment in the state and increased the momentum of various land law protests within the state. Uttarakhand Kranti Dal organised various protests and rallies within the state which paved way for its resurgence a few years later.

By 2026, protests have reemerged, demanding that a criminal investigation be transferred to the CBI to disclose the identity of the VIP in the investigation after the allegations made by Urmila Sanawar. The investigation was approved by the Uttarakhand government. An FIR was also lodged by environmentalist Anil Prakash Joshi to identify the VIP.

On October 12 2026, Dushyant Kumar Gautam, former BJP leader, was appointed Governor of Sikkim. Gautam had allegations made against him in connection with the alleged VIP angle in Bhandari’s murder. Uttarakhand Congress chief Ganesh Godiyal announced a symbolic silent protest against the appointment. On 14 October, Bhandari’s parents staged a sit-in at India Gate in Delhi where Ankita’s father issued a 24-hour ultimatum to the government, demanding that Gautam’s appointment be put on hold until the Central Bureau of Investigation’s (CBI) probe was completed. Ankita’s parents were detained at India Gate around 3:45 am on 15th October along with eight other activists and Congress leaders. They were released around 5 am of the same day.

== See also ==
- Murder of Kiran Negi
- Murder of Shraddha Walkar
