= Azizia Madrasa =

Madrasa in Bihar, India, 1896–2023

Interior of the Azizia Madrasa, Bihar Sharif prior to its destruction by a mob on 31 March 2023

The Azizia Madrasa, also known as Madrassa Azizia, was a madrasa located in Bihar Sharif, Bihar, India. It housed a library, consisting of around 4,500 volumes. The structure was destroyed in 2023 by a Ram Navami riot during communal violence during the Shobha Yatra organized by Bajrang Dal.

== History ==
The complex was initially established in 1896 in Patna by Bibi Soghara in memory of her late husband, Abdul Aziz, after inheriting large sums and donating the wealth to found schools. Later, the institution shifted to Bihar Sharif in 1910. The madrassa was under the management of the Soghara Trust. The madrasa housed a school of 500 students, with 85% being girls. Within the madrasa complex, there were forty shops with half of the shops being owned by Hindus. Its library consisting of volumes from different centuries, covering subjects such as science, philosophy and logic, Islamic literature, medicine, divinity, Hadiths, including Arabic books from Egypt and Turkey. The library had 4,500 books, with 250 of them being rare, historical, and handwritten.

=== Destruction ===
The madrasa had previously been the target of attacks during 1981 and 2017. On 31 March 2023 between 5:30 p.m. and 6:00 p.m., during the festival of Rama Navami, a mob consisting of a thousand people attacked the madrasa and its library, setting the structures on fire, leading to their destruction. Muslim men in Gagan Diwan locality were forced to say Jai Shri Ram by the mob. The madrasa was attacked again the following day on 1 April 2023. Other properties attacked were the Shahi Masjid in Murarpur, Badi Masjid, Asia Hotel, City Palace Banquet Hall, and Digital Duniya. The remains of the burnt books were buried behind the library by staff afterwards. One individual died in the violence and 77 persons were arrested afterwards. The madrasa was restored afterwards.
