= Vinod Arya =

Indian politician

Vinod Arya is an Indian politician and a former leader of the Bharatiya Janata Party from the state of Uttarakhand. He served as a state minister under the government of then-Chief Minister Trivendra Singh Rawat. He also served as chairman of the Uttarakhand Mati Kala (Pottery) Board with a state minister's rank. In 2018, Vinod Arya was made a state minister with the responsibility of handling the Uttarakhand Animal Welfare Board (Animal Husbandry Department) as its vice president. In 2021, he was appointed as the co-in-charge of the Uttar Pradesh BJP OBC Morcha.

He was expelled from the Bharatiya Janata Party in September 2022 following the arrest of his son, Pulkit Arya, in connection with the Murder of Ankita Bhandari.

== Background ==
He is originally from Roorkee and has a background in the ayurvedic business. His association with the Rashtriya Swayamsevak Sangh helped his political rise within the BJP. His son, Ankit Arya, also held a position as the vice-president of the state OBC commission.

== Controversies ==
=== Expulsion from BJP ===
In September 2022, Vinod Arya and his son, Ankit Arya, were expelled from the BJP after Vinod's other son, Pulkit Arya, was arrested and charged with the murder of Ankita Bhandari, a receptionist who worked at a resort he owned. The murder case sparked widespread public outrage and protests in Uttarakhand. Pulkit Arya, along with two other employees of the resort, was convicted and sentenced to life imprisonment in May 2025 for the murder, destruction of evidence, and criminal conspiracy.

=== Alleged sexual assault and criminal charges ===
In December 2022, a case was registered against Vinod Arya for alleged sexual assault and attempted murder, based on a complaint from his former driver. He was booked at the Jwalapur police station in Haridwar under Sections 377 (unnatural offences), 511 (attempting to commit offences), 307 (attempt to murder), 323 (voluntarily causing hurt), 504 (intentional insult), and 506 (criminal intimidation) of the Indian Penal Code. Police noted conflicting statements from the complainant during the investigation. Also, a video connected to the allegations circulated widely on social media, showing the staffer bleeding from his left wrist while Arya applies a bandage.
