= 2022 Jahangirpuri violence =

Incident of communal violence in Jahangurpuri, India on 16 April 2022

- Part of Religious violence in India, Bulldozer politics
- Date: 16 April 2022
- Location: C Block, Jahangirpuri, North Delhi
- Caused by: Conflict during Shobha Yatra on Hanuman Jayanti
- Methods: Arson, Stone Pelting, Shooting

Casualties
- Death: one(ib officer ankit sharma)
- Injuries: 9 (8 police personnel (1 gunshot injury), 1 civilian)
- Arrested: 25
- Damage: Vehicles burnt during the riot 20 shops and shanty huts demolished by the city in the aftermath

A Hindu–Muslim clash occurred in Delhi's Jahangirpuri area on 16 April 2022, in the midst of a Hindu procession on the occasion of Hanuman Jayanti. The clash took place during the last of three processions organised that day by Bajrang Dal, a right wing Hindu group nationalist organization. The procession, whose members were reportedly brandishing swords and pistols, halted near a mosque where Muslims were holding Ramadan prayers, while blasting music from loudspeakers and shouting abusive slogans. A conflict broke out, during which both groups pelted the other with stones and other objects; a few shots were fired as well. A number of people were injured, including a police officer. Twenty three people were arrested, including two juveniles.

On the 19 April, prompted by a complaint from its state president, the Bharatiya Janata Party that controls the local municipal corporation ordered demolition of the houses, shops and structures on the street where riots took place, as they were illegal encroachments. The Supreme Court of India issued a stay order, but some 20 shops and the front of a mosque were demolished, with the drive continuing for over an hour after being stayed by the Supreme Court.

== Background ==
Hanuman Jayanti occurs on the full moon day (Poornima) of the Chaitra month of the Hindu calendar (usually occurring in March–April). It follows Ram Navami, which occurs on the ninth day (Navami) of Chaitra. In the year 2022, both the festivals fell during the Muslim month of Ramadan, a form of synchronisation that occurs roughly once in 33 years. On the day of Ram Navami, huge processions called Shobha Yatras (processions of pomp and glory) were held by Sangh Parivar organisations around India, and numerous Hindu–Muslim clashes occurred.

== Incident ==
On 16 April 2022, three processions of Hanuman Jayanti, all called "Shobha Yatras", passed through the Jahangirpuri area. The first two, in the morning and in the afternoon, had due permission from the police and went off without an incident. The third procession in the evening, an unauthorised one, took a different route than the first two.

According to the local residents, all three processions were organised by Bajrang Dal. They had participants armed with tridents, swords, knives, baseball bats, hockey sticks and a few country-made pistols. They were dancing to loud music (described as "highly objectionable and provocative") (Note: The songs and slogans used during the Shobha Yatras in April 2022 have been analysed by reporters and commentators. A sample: "Flags will have to be raised at Kashi and Mathura as well." "Enemies of Hinduism will be made to cry tears of blood." "Those who don’t chant Lord Ram’s name, need to be run out of India." "The day my blood boils, I wish to show you your place; Then I will not speak, only my sword will." Channel 4 News described the slogans as "too vicious to broadcast". In contrast, the BJP Vice-President Jay Panda believed the songs were the "equivalent of Christmas carrols".) and chanting "Jai Shri Ram". The Muslims alleged that the processionists tried to enter the Kushal Road mosque, and hoist a saffron flag with "Jai Shri Ram" embossed on it, and that clashes started only after the processionists started to desecrate the mosque. According to NewsClick, the third procession did not follow the prescribed route, and there were saffron flags and stones scattered at the entrance of the mosque. The Hindu processionists however insisted that the people from inside the mosque and the adjoining Muslim residents attacked them with stones. A Hindu who had been a part of the procession claimed that the Muslim locals had forced them to take a different route during the first two Shobha Yatras, and that the third time, they had allowed them to follow that route but ambushed them later . According to the processionists, the brandishing of swords and tridents was ceremonial in nature.

Once trouble started, both the groups pelted stones, bricks and beer bottles. A few shots were also fired. Eight police personnel and one civilian were injured according to the police. A sub-inspector received a bullet injury. There were no deaths. Some Hindus also claimed that their properties were damaged or looted by rampaging Muslim men in the evening.

== Investigation ==
A First Information Report (FIR) was filed by police inspector Rajiv Ranjan Singh, who was on the spot. It stated that the procession was "peaceful" until it reached the mosque. Violence broke out after a man named Anshar (or Ansar), accompanied by a few others, started arguing with the members of the procession. It said the argument grew into a riotous situation and stone pelting started from both sides. The police managed to separate the two sides, but after a few minutes, stone pelting started again.

Commentators noted that the FIR leaned towards the version of the events offered by "Hindus" (processionists). It did not mention the brandishing of swords or firearms, playing of provocating songs and slogan shouting. It also did not explain why the permissible route was not followed by the procession. There was also no mention of the efforts to hoist a saffron flag on the mosque. The Police Commissioner Rakesh Asthana later dismissed the theory of saffron flags being planted on the mosque as baseless.

Early the next day, 14 Muslim men were arrested. The local residents questioned why only Muslims were being arrested when both the sides were involved in fighting. Ansar was named as a conspirator. His wife, however, claimed that he was called in from home to defuse the situation at the mosque and he later helped police to control the situation. The police state that he had been involved two cases of assault earlier and had been repeatedly arrested under preventive sections. However, the local residents, both Hindu and Muslim, remember him as an extremely helpful person.

Another man named Mohammad Aslam was alleged to have shot a pistol, with the bullet hitting a police sub-inspector. The pistol used in the shooting was recovered by the police.

Yunus Imam alias Sonu Chikna was also arrested after a video was circulated on social media on 17 April showing him firing a pistol during the riots. The police personnel who had gone to arrest him were initially attacked by his family members who pelted stones at the police, according to a spokesperson, who added that one person had been detained and the situation brought under control.

Sheikh Hameed, a scrap dealer, was arrested for supplying glass bottle to be used as missiles. On 18 April, Forensic teams collected samples, took photographs and collected CCTV footage of the riot scene.

Delhi police initially linked Vishva Hindu Parishad (VHP) and Bajrang Dal for taking out a procession without permission but later retracted the names of the organisations, just stating that the procession was taken out without seeking permission.

On 19 April, National Security Act (NSA) was invoked upon 5 people accused of being the conspirators of this riot. On the same day, police arrested Ghulam Rasool alias Gulli for supplying the pistol used during the riot.

The police also released CCTV footage from the night before the riots, where several men are seen collecting sticks and rods from a nearby garbage dump, which led to an altercation with locals. The police have considered the possibility of the clash being planned well in advance.

On 23 April, Enforcement Directorate (ED) filed a money laundering case against Ansar, who is said to have an affluent home at Haldia in West Bengal.

== Demolitions ==
The BJP-controlled North Delhi Municipal Corporation, acting on a complaint by its state party president, issued a late-night order on 19 April 2022, to demolish houses and shops on the street where the riot had occurred, claiming them to be encroachments into public areas. Nine bulldozers rolled into the area by 9:30 am the next day, along with 14 civic teams and 1,500 police personnel, many in riot gear.

This pattern had already occurred in many states during the month of April. Demolition drives had been carried out following communal clashes in the states of Madhya Pradesh, Gujarat and Uttarakhand, all ruled by BJP governments, targeting "one community" (Muslims). A BJP leader revealed to The Indian Express that the Delhi BJP leadership wanted the Yogi Adityanath's model (from Uttar Pradesh) (Note: Yogi Adityanath, the chief minister of Uttar Pradesh has earned the moniker of "Bulldozer Baba" due to his frequent deployment of bulldozers to demolish houses as well as threats to so.) in Delhi, and the central BJP leadership took the decision to go ahead with it.

A petitioner rushed to the Supreme Court of India to stop the demolition. A three judge bench headed by the Chief Justice N. V. Ramana heard the petition. The petitioner's counsel argued:

This is about a completely unconstitutional and illegal demolition which has been ordered in Jahangirpuri area, where riots took place last week. No notice has been served. There is a provision for appeal under the Municipal Corporation Act. We have filed a provisional application (before SC). It was supposed to start at 2 PM but they started the demolition today morning at 9 AM knowing that we will mention [it].

— Dushyant Dave, Live Law (20 April 2022)

The Chief Justice ordered maintenance of the status quo until the next hearing. But the demolitions did not stop. Officials said that they did not have the court order in hand yet and continued with the demolition. Another hearing and another order to halt the demolition "immediately" were necessary. CPI(M)'s Brinda Karat took a copy of the order, rushed to the demolition site, and stood in front of a bulldozer, asking them to stop.

By this time, some 20 shops were bulldozed as well as the front of the mosque, from where the attacks allegedly took place during the riot. The officials claimed that they had received the Supreme Court order before they could get to it, though the residents contest this claim. Later, Hindus in the area voluntarily removed the encroached area of the temple.

== See also ==
- 2020 Delhi riots
