= Surendra Singh Negi =

Indian politician

Surendra Singh Negi is an Uttarakhand politician. He is a former MLA of the Uttarakhand Legislative Assembly from Kotdwar. He is a member of the Indian National Congress. He was a minister in the Cabinets of N. D. Tiwari, Vijay Bahuguna and Harish Rawat. In 2012 Assembly election, he defeated B. C. Khanduri by 4,623 votes. He has close political relations with powerful politicians Shri Chandra Mohan Singh Negi and Girdhari Lal Amoli.

== Positions held ==
Year	Description
1985 - 1989	Elected to 9th Uttar Pradesh Assembly from Lansdowne (1st term)
1993 - 1996	Elected to 11th Uttar Pradesh Assembly from Lansdowne (2nd term)
2002 - 2005	Elected to 1st Uttarakhand Assembly from Kotdwar (3rd term): Cabinet Minister - Rural Development, Drinking Water
2005 - 2007	Elected to 1st Uttarakhand Assembly from Kotdwar in by election (4th term)
2012 - 2017	Elected to 3rd Uttarakhand Assembly from Kotdwar (5th term): Cabinet Minister - Medical Services, Family Welfare, Ayush, Ayurvedic and Unani Education, Science and Technology, Sugarcane Development and Sugar Industries, Paramilitary Welfare

== Legislative career ==
=== Elections contested ===
Year	Constituency	Result	Vote Percentage	Opposition Candidate	Opposition Party	Opposition vote Percentage
1980	Lansdowne	Lost	2.92	Chandra Mohan Negi	LKD	48.12
1985	Lansdowne	Won	50.79	Bharat Singh Rawat	INC	41.82
1989	Lansdowne	Lost	37.87	Bharat Singh Rawat	INC	46.82
1991	Lansdowne	Lost	27.22	Bharat Singh Rawat	INC	28.27
1993	Lansdowne	Won	34.83	Mohan Singh Rawat	BJP	27.37
1996	Lansdowne	Lost	23.06	Bharat Singh Rawat	BJP	55.83
2002	Kotdwar	Won	49.57	Bhubneshwar Kharkwal	IND	22.83
2005 (By Elect)	Kotdwar	Won	56.00	Anil Baluni	BJP	37.89
2007	Kotdwar	Lost	44.63	Shailendra Singh Rawat	BJP	46.17
2012	Kotdwar	Won	51.19	B. C. Khanduri	BJP	43.74
2017	Kotdwar	Lost		Harak Singh Rawat	BJP	NA
2022	Kotdwar	Lost		Ritu Khanduri Bhushan	BJP	NA
