= Ram Navami riots =

Communal clashes during Rama Navami rallies

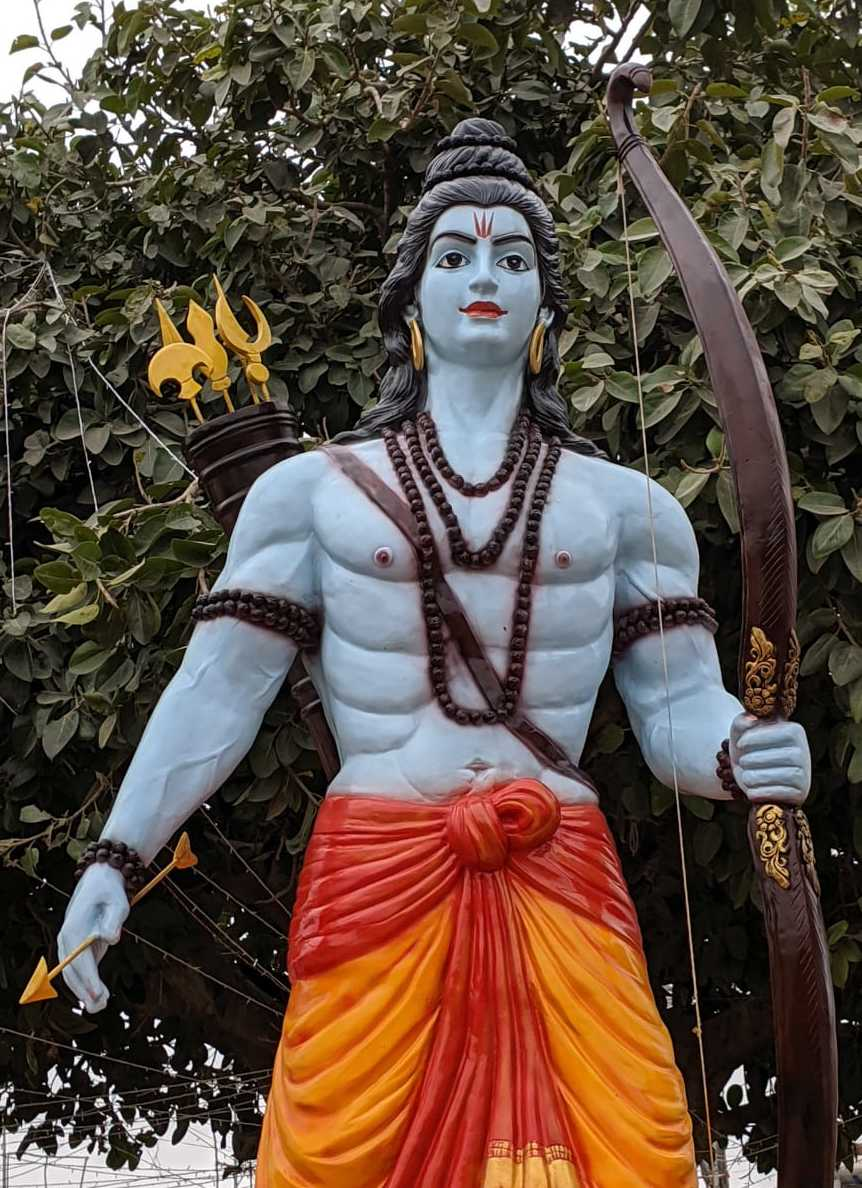
Rama

Rama Navami is a Hindu festival celebrating the birthday of Hindu deity Rama. It falls on the 9th day of the Chaitra month every year in the Hindu calendar, usually during the months of March–April. At least since 1979, if not earlier, this festival has involved carrying out armed processions throughout the cities by Hindutva outfits, which also enter Muslim localities as a way to show Hindu strength. These intimidating processions by Hindu outfits, often considered offensive by the Muslims, have repeatedly led to violence between Hindu and Muslim communities.

Scholar Paul Brass states that since the days of the Ram-mandir movement of late 1980s (when Hindutva outfits sought to re-construct a Hindu temple at the mythical birthplace of Rama by tearing down the mosque standing on its place), Rama himself has been turned into a political emblem of the RSS family of Hindu-right wing organisations, and the Rama Navami processions are "led by or turned into provocative displays" by Hindutva organisations such as the Vishva Hindu Parishad (VHP) and Bajrang Dal.

== Background ==
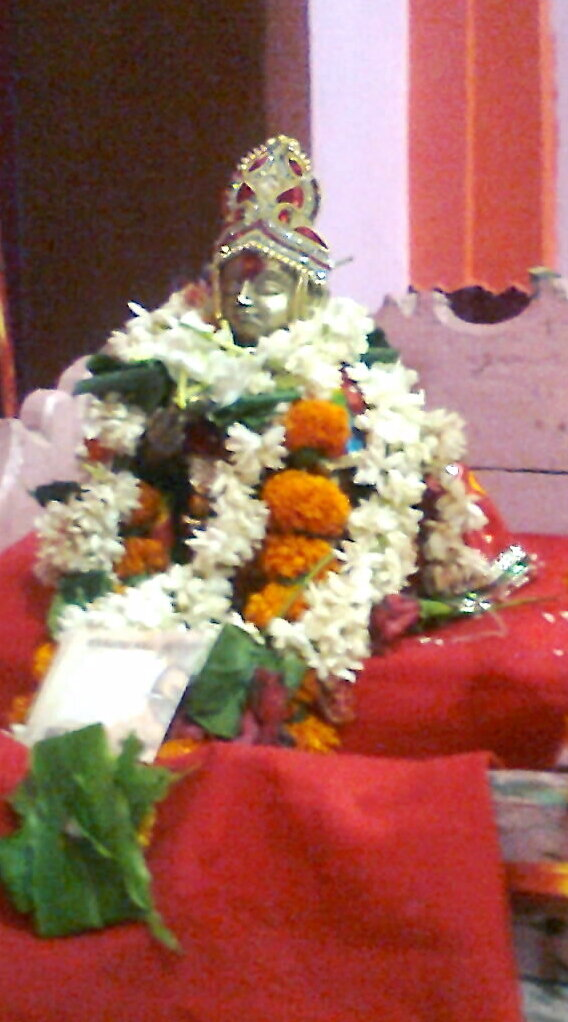
Baby Rama at Chinawal village temple, Maharashtra

Rama is regarded as the seventh avatar of Vishnu, who was born as the prince of Ayodhya and lived a model life upholding the Hindu principles of dharma despite all his travails. Rama's birthday (Rama Navami) which falls on the 9th day of the Hindu new year (generally in March–April) is celebrated by Hindus all over the world. The day is marked with puja (devotional worship) such as bhajan and kirtan, by fasting and reading passages about Rama's life. Special locations mentioned in the Ramayana legends observe major celebrations. These include Ayodhya (Uttar Pradesh), Rameswaram (Tamil Nadu), Bhadrachalam (Telangana) and Sitamarhi (Bihar). Some locations organise Ratha Yatras (chariot processions).

Rama is central to the political imagination of the Hindu nationalist organisation Rashtriya Swayamsevak Sangh (RSS), the parent organisation of the ruling Bharatiya Janata Party (BJP). RSS was launched on the Vijayadashami day of 1925, a day commemorating Rama's victory over Ravana, and it was given its name "Rashtriya Swayamsevak Sangh" on the Rama Navami day of 1926. Its first public mission was in assisting the organisation of the Rama Navami festival at Ramtek, an occasion selected by its founder Hedgewar with "great care". RSS also chose for itself a flag, which, in its saffron colour and shape, is deemed to have been Rama's flag. It is believed to have been used by Shivaji.

For several decades of its existence, religion was not a major part of the RSS efforts of mobilisation, but rather a 'nationalist' campaign, identifying the 'nation' with Hindus. (The religious space was at that time occupied by Hindu Mahasabha, a political party with which RSS was vaguely allied.) This changed in 1964, when the RSS founded Vishva Hindu Parishad (VHP), an affiliate organisation that would campaign for Hindus as well as the Hindu religion.

According to The Hitavada, a grand procession called Shobha Yatra (Note: "Shobha Yatra" literally means a "shining" or "glorious" procession. One source calls it a "a long procession with great pomp and show". It was traditionally associated with akharas or ascetic orders.) was started on the occasion of Rama Navami in Nagpur, the home of the RSS, around 1967. In contrast to traditional rath-yatras, which are organised by temples and are generally limited to nearby areas, the shobha yatras are grand processions of pomp and ceremony attempting to cover entire cities, involving "cavalcades of vehicles, each carrying dozens of men, shouting slogans and frequently wielding arms". In 1987, in the midst of the Babri Masjid–Ram Janmabhoomi dispute, the Vishva Hindu Parishad is said to have organised country-wide shobha yatras, including in Delhi, where arms were displayed and provocative slogans were raised.

== 1979 Jamshedpur riot ==
The 1979 Jamshedpur riot was the first major riot on the occasion of Rama Navami, in which 108 people were declared to have died, among whom 79 Muslims and 25 Hindus were identified. The government-appointed commission of enquiry, the Jitendra Narain Commission, found the RSS and the RSS-affiliated local legislator, Dinanath Pandey, (Note: Pandey was a member of the Janata Party, but coming from the Bharatiya Jana Sangh and later moving to the Bharatiya Janata Party.) responsible for having created the climate conducive to the riot.

Jamshedpur was then a town in the state of Bihar (now a city in the state of Jharkhand), named after the industrialist Jamshedji Tata, who established India's first steel plant at the location. The entire region was originally populated by tribes, referred to as adivasis. People from various parts of India came to work in the steel plant and settled in the town. The government in power at that time was that of a loose-knit coalition called Janata Party, of which the present day Bharatiya Janata Party was a constituent.

In an attempt to Hinduise the adivasi population, the RSS planned the Rama Navami procession of 1978 to start from an adivasi neighbourhood called Dimnabasti. However, the neighbouring locality was a Muslim area called Sabirnagar and the authorities refused permission for the procession to pass through it. The RSS campaigned on the issue for a whole year, arguing that the Hindus "in their own country" were not being allowed to freely carry out processions. The administration suggested an alternative route for 1979 that would avoid Sabirnagar, but the RSS did not relent.

Tensions increased in Jamshedpur as a result of the stand-off. Hindus forced the closure of shops and a few of them were arrested. In March 1979, the RSS chief Balasaheb Deoras visited Jamshedpur and gave a polarising speech, which further exacerbated the situation. An organisation called Sri Ramnavmi Kendriya Akhara Samiti issued a pamphlet on 7 April which declared communal violence and also detailed how it would occur. Eventually, a deal was reached and a sample procession passed through the Muslim locality, accompanied by local Muslims. But the main procession, which grew to 15,000 people, stopped in front of a mosque. The local MLA Dinanath Pandey announced that it would not move until all the arrested Hindus are released.

Eventually a stone was thrown at the procession from the side of the Muslims, who were also prepared for the violence. That provided the spark for the riots, which lasted several days. Thousands of houses were looted. Muslims living in Hindu areas were especially vulnerable. The police also proved to be partisan, targeting the Muslims more than the Hindus and also helping the Hindus in rioting. The government of Karpuri Thakur, a socialist within the Janata Party, fell roughly ten days after the events.

== 1984–1993 ==
In the early 1980s, the RSS pushed the Vishva Hindu Parishad to the forefront in an effort to create a 'Hindu vote'. The VHP held a series of conferences (Dharma Sansads), calling for the liberation of the Ram Janmabhoomi (Rama's birthplace), which was at that time occupied by the Babri Masjid. From then till 1992, when the Babri Masjid was demolished, the mobilisation of Hindus along religious lines was the main occupation of the VHP. Rama Navami as well as all other Hindu festivals were utilised for the purpose.

In 1986, the Rama Navami was on 16 April, a procession was taken out by Hindus, which was protested by the Muslims and therefore there was confrontation between the two communities. In 1987, Rama Navami Shobha Yatras were organised around the country. The Shobha Yatra in Delhi, which closely followed a rally organised by the Muslims in defence of the Babri Masjid, raised provocative slogans and brandished arms. The 1991 Bhadrak Communal violence was a communal incident which took place on day of Rama Navami in Bhadrak of Odisha on 20 March 1991. The riot happened during the Rama Navami procession while the procession was passing through the Muslim dominated area of Bhadrak town.

According to police records, 17 persons were murdered, 90 injured, 226 houses burnt and 143 shops were looted in Bhatkal, Karnataka. The riots were sparked off on April Fools' Day, when a stone was reportedly hurled at a Rama Navami procession.

== 2006 Aligarh riot ==
On 5 April 2006, violence broke out between Hindus and Muslim during the Rama Navami celebration which led to the death of five people.

== 2009 Pusad riot ==
Rama Navami procession in Pusad, Maharashtra was disrupted and stones were pelted which led to a violent riot. Over 70 shops were burnt and property was damaged in the riots.

== 2014 Kanpur riot ==
When police and administration denied the permission for Rama Navami procession, violence broke out injuring many.

== 2016 Hazaribagh violence ==
Curfew was promulgated in Hazaribagh town of Jharkhand and in surrounding areas after two groups of people clashed, torched shops and pelted stones at policemen injuring several of them on the last day of the Rama Navami festival.

== 2018 Bihar riots ==
On 25 March 2018, Aurangabad reported the communal clashes in which stone pelting incidents occurred during Ram Navami procession. 122 people arrested linked with clashes in two days. 25 people injured and 50 shops vandalised. Ram Navmi procession was taken out by Hindu Akhadas which turned into violent mob. Authorities imposed Curfew and internet was snapped to maintain law and order situation.2018 Bihar riots

== 2018 West Bengal riots ==
Rama Navami procession that was scheduled to take place in Raniganj was disrupted when people from the Muslim community objected to the use of loudspeakers. Soon the heated debate turned violent, and police personnel was attacked with bricks and stones. Bombing with crude bombs started as soon as the mob became violent. Arindam Dutta Chowdhry Deputy Commissioner of Police (Headquarter), who reached the spot to monitor the situation, got injured in the bomb attack with his right hand almost blown away in the blast.

== 2019 riots ==
A Rama Navami rally taken out in Asansol, West Bengal, from Barakar Marwari Vidyalay, with most rallyist on the bikes, when they attempted to pass through the Barakar Bazar. they torched vehicles and pelted stones at house, When they retaliated, the face-off turned violent.

In Jodhpur, Rajasthan, a communal clash broke out on 13 April, Some vehicles were set on fire and mobs stoned houses and clashed with police injuring two cops in Vyapariyon ka Mohalla in Soorsagar police station.

== 2022 riots ==
In 2022, Rama Navami fell on 10 April 2022, in the first part of the month of Ramadan. India witnessed violence across multiple states, during processions on 10 April 2022, on the occasion of the Hindu festival of Ram Navami, the birth anniversary of Hindu God Rama. Dozens of people were injured, including police officers. At least one person was killed in Gujarat. Dozens of houses, shops and vehicles were set on fire during the clashes, causing loss of crores of rupees. Later on 17 April 2022, Indian police arrest 14 in New Delhi in connection with communal violence.

- Violent clashes were reported which led to death of a person during the Rama Navami procession in Gujarat. Several shops were burnt and vehicles were damaged. Police had to fire tear gas shell to bring situation under control amid stone pelting. Various incidents of clashes took place in Khambat and Himmatnagar. The clash in Himmatnagar started when the procession entered the Muslim-majority area where verbal altercations were followed by sloganeering after which, the mob attacked shops and started stone-pelting on the homes. There are also reports of 2 deaths and hundreds of people injured.
- A dispute between the student union JNSU and the BJP's student body ABVP over non-vegetarian meals on Rama Navami day at Jawaharlal Nehru University in Delhi, turned violent. At least 16 students were injured in clashes. ABVP said that offering non-vegetarian food on the auspicious occasion of Rama Navami was tantamount to insulting the Hindu deity Rama. Delhi Police registered a case in this regard. The injured were admitted to hospitals for treatment.
- Clashes were reported at least from 2 places in the state of Jharkhand, Bokaro and Lohardaga, on Rama Navami. In Bokaro, a few youth were attacked on their way to a Rama Navami procession. In Lohardaga, the violence was on a larger scale with the mob who rallying have set a fire on several vehicles. At least 12 people were injured in a clash that included stone-pelting during a Ram Naomi procession, three of them in critical condition.
- Madhya Pradesh's Khargone and other towns in the state saw huge violence during the Rama Navami procession. To maintain law and order, police had to fire tear gas shells and curfew was imposed in Khargone. According to reports, accused in the Delhi riots, BJP leader Kapil Mishra was also involved in Ram Naomi's procession in Khargone. Former Madhya Pradesh Chief Minister Digvijaya Singh wrote in a tweet, "Wherever Mishra steps, riots break out."
- Rama Navami procession was attacked and disrupted in West Bengal. BJP, the main opposition party, alleged that the police attacked a religious procession.
- In Goa, clashes were reported when stones were pelted on Rama Navami procession.
- Maharashtra's Amravati saw violent clashed between Hindus and Muslim which led to stone pelting. To maintain law and order, police imposed curfew under section 144.
- On 16 April 2022, communal clashes broke out between Hindu worshipers and Muslim locals when a Hanuman Jayanti procession was passing through the area of Jahangirpuri in North west Delhi. They stoned mosques and homes while passing the Jahangirpuri Many people including Delhi policemen were injured. Delhi Police mentioned that the procession which led to this clash did not have a prior permission.
- Clashes erupted during the Ram Navmi procession in the Shibpur area of Howrah in West Bengal. Police say steps have been taken to maintain law and order and the situation is under control. The opposition BJP in the state has accused the police of attacking the protesters.

== 2023 riots ==
In 2023, Rama Navami fell on 30 March, in the middle of Muslim month of Ramadan.

- In the Jalgaon district, Maharashtra a clash broke out on 29 March between two groups after a procession accompanied by Hindu DJ music was taken out in front of a mosque while namaz was going on. It was reported that four people were injured in the violence.
- On 30 March local youths thrashed a group of bike-born youths raising objectionable and communally charged slogans in Kiradpura area of Aurangabad. The incident resulted into stone pelting, followed by torching of at least nine police vehicles. One person succumbed to a bullet wound while 14 policemen, including five officers, were injured.
- On the night of 30 March, two groups clashed during procession at Malvani area of Malad (West) in Mumbai. Stones were pelted on homes in the area, devotees when they were carrying forward a Shobha Yatra of Rama with loud music and high-volume DJ. Later 20 people were arrested for pelting stones at the procession.
- In the Rishra Railway Station of West Bengal, tension erupted after stones were allegedly pelted at the procession. Violence continued for a second day with reports of stone pelting and vehicles being torched.
- One person killed and several others being injured after a violence erupted during procession in Dalkhola city of Bengal.
- Tensions flared in Sasaram, Bihar on 30 March after people returning from a procession were allegedly beaten and a local mosque was pelted with stones. The next morning clashes took a violent turn as both communities started pelting stones at each other. Vehicles were damaged and shops were set on fire.
- Fierce ruckus broke out between two groups in Nalanda, Bihar on 31 March. Miscreants pelted stones and set around half a dozen vehicles ablaze.The clash broke after people of the Shobha Yatra by VHP attended by more than 20,000 workers of Bajrang Dal stoned homes and nearby mosques. The 110-years old library of Madrasa Azizia with over 4500 books was reduced to ashes by the mob.
- In Sonipat, Haryana some miscreants from the procession hoisted their flag over a mosque in the way with communal sloganeering. Later heavy police force was deployed around the mosque and five arrests were made.
- Stone-pelting incident was reported from Gujarat's Vadodara on 31 March. Two processions were taken out by Hindu right wing outfits - VHP and Bajrang Dal. Several videos of the mob, making communally charged remarks during the processions, were circulated on social media platforms. However, the police said that the situation is under control and peace has been restored in the area.

== 2024 riots ==
On 17 April 2024, violence erupted against a Ram Navami procession in Shaktipur area of West Bengal's Murshidabad. Stones were pelted at the procession from rooftops. There were also reports of a bombing incident. Over 20 people were injured including a woman and two children, who were admitted to Murshidabad Medical College. Many shops were allegedly vandalized as part of the violence. Prohibitory orders under Section 144 were imposed in the area. The police resorted to lathicharge and fired tear gas shells to disperse the mob. Central forces were deployed to keep the situation in control. Suvendu Adhikari, a politician from Bharatiya Janata Party criticized the then chief minister of West Bengal, Mamata Banerjee for allegedly inciting the attacks. A day later, Vishva Hindu Parishad demanded a NIA probe to the incident.

On the same day in Bangalore three men were assaulted by a group of five bikers for chanting the slogan Jai Shree Ram. The men reportedly were also insisted to chant Allah Hu Akbar instead. The incident was recorded by the victims and posted on social media which went viral. A FIR was lodged in Vidyaranyapura police station and three of the accused were arrested while the others managed to escape.

== Bibliography ==
- Ahmad, Aijaz (2022), New Dimensions of Indian Historiography: Historical Facts and Hindutva Interpretation, K.K. Publications
- Basu, Tapan; Datta, Pradip; Sarkar, Sumit; Sarkar, Tanika; Sen, Sambuddha (1993), Khaki Shorts and Saffron Flags: A Critique of the Hindu Right, Orient Longman, ISBN 0863113834
- Datta, Pradip; Pati, Biswamoy; Sarkar, Sumit; Sarkar, Tanika; Sen, Sambuddha (10 November 1990), "Understanding Communal Violence: Nizamuddin Riots", Economic and Political Weekly, 25 (45): 2487–2489+2491–2495, JSTOR 4396965
- Frykenberg, Robert E. (2008), "Hindutva as a Political Religion: An Historical Perspective", in R. Griffin; R. Mallett; J. Tortorice (eds.), The Sacred in Twentieth-Century Politics: Essays in Honour of Professor Stanley G. Payne, Palgrave Macmillan UK, pp. 178–220, ISBN 978-0-230-24163-3
- Jaffrelot, Christophe (1996), The Hindu Nationalist Movement and Indian Politics, C. Hurst & Co. Publishers, ISBN 978-1850653011
- Huda, Kashif-Ul (23–29 May 2009), "Communal Riots and Jamshedpur", Economic and Political Weekly, 44 (21): 19–21, JSTOR 40279029
- Islam, Maidul (2018). "Big national parties in West Bengal: An exceptional outcast?". In Mujibur Rehman (ed.). Rise of Saffron Power: Reflections on Indian Politics. Taylor & Francis. ISBN 978-0-429-01397-3.
- Nath, Suman; Roy Chowdhury, Subhoprotim (2019), "Mapping Polarisation: Four Ethnographic Cases from West Bengal", Journal of Indian Anthropological Society, 54: 51–64 – via academia.edu
