= Kotdwar =

Kotdwar Kanva Nagri Kotdwar, Kootdwar, Kotdwar
- City
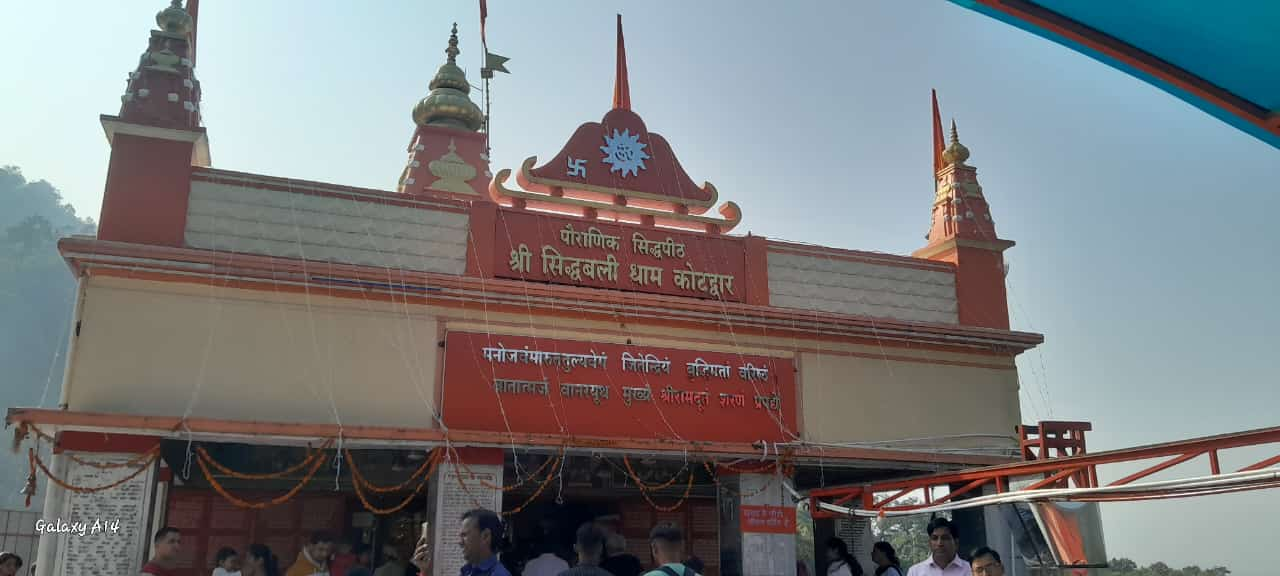
- Sidhbali Temple, Kotdwar
- Nickname: Gateway of hills
- Motto(s): Gateway to the Himalayas, Kanva Nagri
- Location of Kotdwar in India Kotdwar (India)
- Coordinates: 29°45′0″N 78°31′48″E
- Country: India
- State: Uttarakhand
- District: Pauri Garhwal
- Established: 19th century
- Founded: 1890
- Municipality: 1952
- Named for: The gateway to the High Hill Koot

Government
  - Type: Municipal Corporation
  - Body: Kotdwar Municipal Corporation
  - Mayor: Shailendra Singh Rawat (BJP)
  - Lok Sabha MP: Anil Baluni (BJP)
  - MLA: Ritu Khanduri Bhushan (BJP)
  - Municipal Commissioner: P.L. Shah, IAS

Area
  - Total: 80 km^{2} (31 sq mi)
- Elevation: 454 m (1,490 ft)

Population (2011)
  - Total: 175,232

Languages
  - Official: Hindi, Sanskrit
  - Native: Garhwali
- Time zone: UTC+5:30 (IST)
- PIN: 246149
- Telephone code: +91-1382
- Vehicle registration: UK-15

Kotdwar is a city, and a municipal corporation in Pauri Garhwal district of Uttarakhand, India. It is 107 km from Pauri, the district headquarters. It is the eighth-largest city in Uttarakhand. Its former name was Kootdwar, which means the gateway of the high hill. It is situated in the southwestern part of the state and is one of the main entrance points in the state of Uttarakhand. Initially isolated and less known, it came into prominence when it was connected with rails in 1890 by the British. Kotdwar is known for the Sidhbali Temple dedicated to Hanuman, which is situated 2 km (1.2 mi) from Kotdwar.

== Etymology ==
Kotdwar translates to Gateway to Garhwal because the town is located in the foothills of Pauri Garhwal region in Uttarakhand.

== History ==
The city was initially ruled by the Mauryan Empire under the Great Ashoka, followed by the rule of Katyuri Dynasty and then the Panwar Dynasty of Garhwal.

=== British rule ===
Gorkha reigned Kotdwar for almost 12 years, after which the British defeated them and took control over the region. The Kotdwar Railway Station established by the British is one of the oldest in India. It was mainly used for transporting timber from Garhwal. The first passenger train ran in 1901.

== Geography ==
Kotdwar is at foothills of Himalayas. The city's total area is 80 km^{2} (31 sq mi). By road Kotdwar is 25 kilometres (16 mi) North of Najibabad, 216 km (134 mi) North East of Delhi, 70 kilometres (43 mi) East of Haridwar, 116 kilometres (72 mi) South East of Dehradun, 208 km (129 mi) West of Nainital.

Kotdwar lies on the western margin of the Himalayas, at an altitude of 454 m (1,490 ft) above sea level.

=== Climate ===
The climate of Kotdwar is generally sub-tropical, although it varies from tropical; from hot in summers to severely cold in winter, depending upon the season and the altitude of the specific location. The nearby hilly regions often get snowfall during winter but the temperature in Kotdwar is not known to fall below freezing. Summer temperature can often reach 40 °C (104 °F) whereas winter temperature are usually between 4 and 20 °C (39 and 68 °F). The highest temperature of Pauri district has been recorded at Kotdwar at 44 °C (111 °F) During the monsoon season, there is often heavy and protracted rainfall. Kotdwar and other plains areas of Uttarakhand see almost as much rainfall as Coastal Maharashtra. The weather is considered to be good during winter in the hilly regions. Agriculture benefits from fertile alluvial soil, adequate drainage, and plentiful rain.

The warmest month (with the highest average high temperature) is May 36 °C (97 °F). The month with the lowest average high temperature is January 20 °C (68 °F). The coldest month (with the highest average low temperature) is January 6 °C (43 °F).

The wettest month (with the highest rainfall) is July – 361 mm (14.2 in). The driest month (with the lowest rainfall) is November – 10 mm (0.39 in).

The month with the longest days is June (Average daylight: 14h). The month with shortest days is December (Average daylight: 10.3h).

Climate data for Kotdwar
Month	Jan	Feb	Mar	Apr	May	Jun	Jul	Aug	Sep	Oct	Nov	Dec	Year
Record high °C (°F)	22 (72)	26 (79)	33 (91)	40 (104)	41 (106)	44 (111)	36 (97)	36 (97)	34 (93)	32 (90)	28 (82)	24 (75)	44 (111)
Mean daily maximum °C (°F)	20 (68)	22 (72)	27 (81)	33 (91)	36 (97)	34 (93)	31 (88)	30 (86)	30 (86)	29 (84)	26 (79)	22 (72)	28 (83)
Mean daily minimum °C (°F)	6 (43)	9 (48)	13 (55)	18 (64)	23 (73)	25 (77)	27 (81)	29 (84)	25 (77)	21 (70)	17 (63)	13 (55)	19 (66)
Record low °C (°F)	3 (37)	6 (43)	10 (50)	18 (64)	21 (70)	23 (73)	25 (77)	26 (79)	22 (72)	16 (61)	11 (52)	8 (46)	3 (37)
Average rainfall mm (inches)	34.4 (1.35)	26.6 (1.05)	16.3 (0.64)	13.4 (0.53)	21.1 (0.83)	76.6 (3.02)	361 (14.2)	270.7 (10.66)	192 (7.6)	35.7 (1.41)	9.7 (0.38)	45.3 (1.78)	1,102.8 (43.45)
Average relative humidity (%)	48	57	43	23	17	24	61	74	78	66	53	57	50
Mean monthly sunshine hours	204.5	203	277.5	351.5	357.5	363	250	236.5	180.5	292	262.5	290.5	3,269
Mean daily sunshine hours	10.5	11.1	12	12.9	13.6	14	13.8	13.2	12.3	11.4	10.7	10.3	12.2
Average ultraviolet index	4	5	8	9	10	10	7	7	6	7	6	4	7
Source 1: Dark Sky
Source 2: WorldWeatherOnline

== Demographics ==
Religion in Kotdwar (2011)
Religion	Percent
Hinduism	90.00%
Islam	9.03%
Christianity	0.45%
Sikh	0.26%
Jainism	0.06%
Others	0.20%

=== Religion ===
Hinduism is the dominant religion in Kotdwar. Other religions with a significant presence include Islam, Christianity, Jainism, Sikhism.

As of 2011 India census, Kotdwar had a population of 175,232. Males constituted 53% of the population and females 47%. Kotdwar had an average literacy rate of 79.63% – higher than the national average of 64.83% – Male literacy was 88%, and female literacy 75.5%. In Kotdwar, 14% of the population was under 6 years of age.

== Education ==
As of the 2011 Census of India, Kotdwar had 26 primary schools, 8 middle schools, 8 secondary schools and 5 senior secondary schools as well as 1 arts college, 1 science college, 1 commerce college and 1 polytechnic college.

== Healthcare ==
Healthcare in the Kotdwar is provided by private and public facilities.

=== Government hospitals ===
- Government hospital
- Kotdwara ECHS Polyclinic

=== Private hospitals ===
- Kotdwar Child Care and Maternity Centre
- Bisht Ortho Hospital
- Devbhoomi Eye Hospital
- Devrani Clinic
- Kala ENT and Skin
- Mansa Maternity And Surgical Centre
- Kotdwar Eye Hospital & Laser Centre
- Maithani Medical Centre
- Maa Kamakhya Multi Speciality Hospital′

== Industry ==
Kotdwar has two major industrial areas, SIDCUL and BEL. Among the industries, the most prominent ones are Simpex Pharma, Reliance Medi Pharma, Polestar polymers, Sidhbali steels, Del Monte, Indica Chemicals, etc.

== Military cantonment ==
The Garhwal Rifles has its base in Lansdowne, approximately 37 km from Kotdwar. Kotdwar also has a cantonment area called VC Gabar Singh Camp and a combined ECHS polyclinic & CSD complex.

== Transportation ==
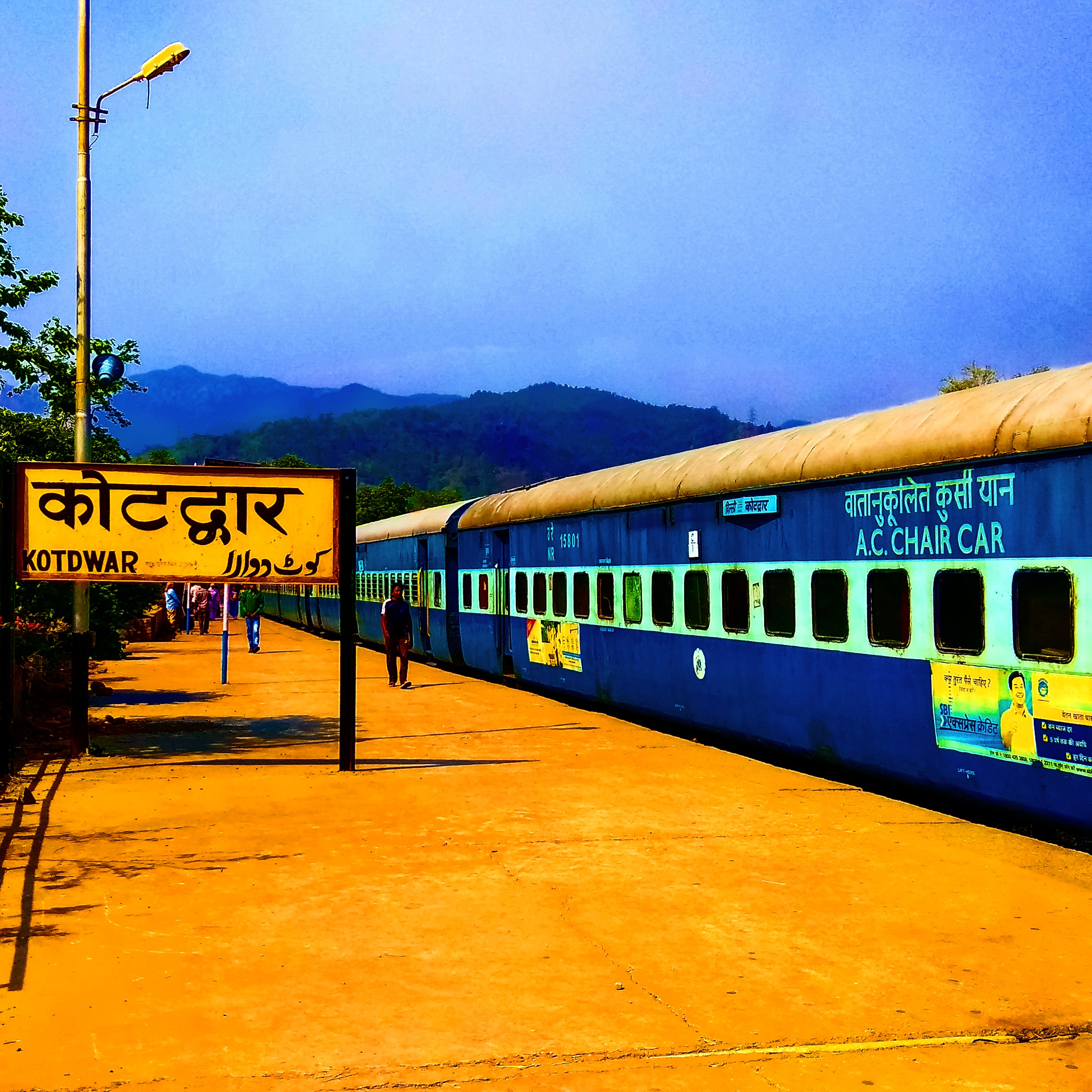
Kotdwar Railway Station

=== Air ===
Jolly Grant Airport is the nearest airport to Kotdwar situated at a distance of 105 km. Taxis and bus are available from Jolly Grant Airport to Kotdwar.

=== Rail ===
Kotdwar is well connected by railways with major cities of India. One of the oldest Railway Station of India is situated at Kotdwar.

=== Road ===
Kotdwar is well connected with roads to major cities of Uttarakhand state. Buses to Kotdwar from Delhi are easily available. Kotdwar is well connected with National Highway 119.

== Tourism ==
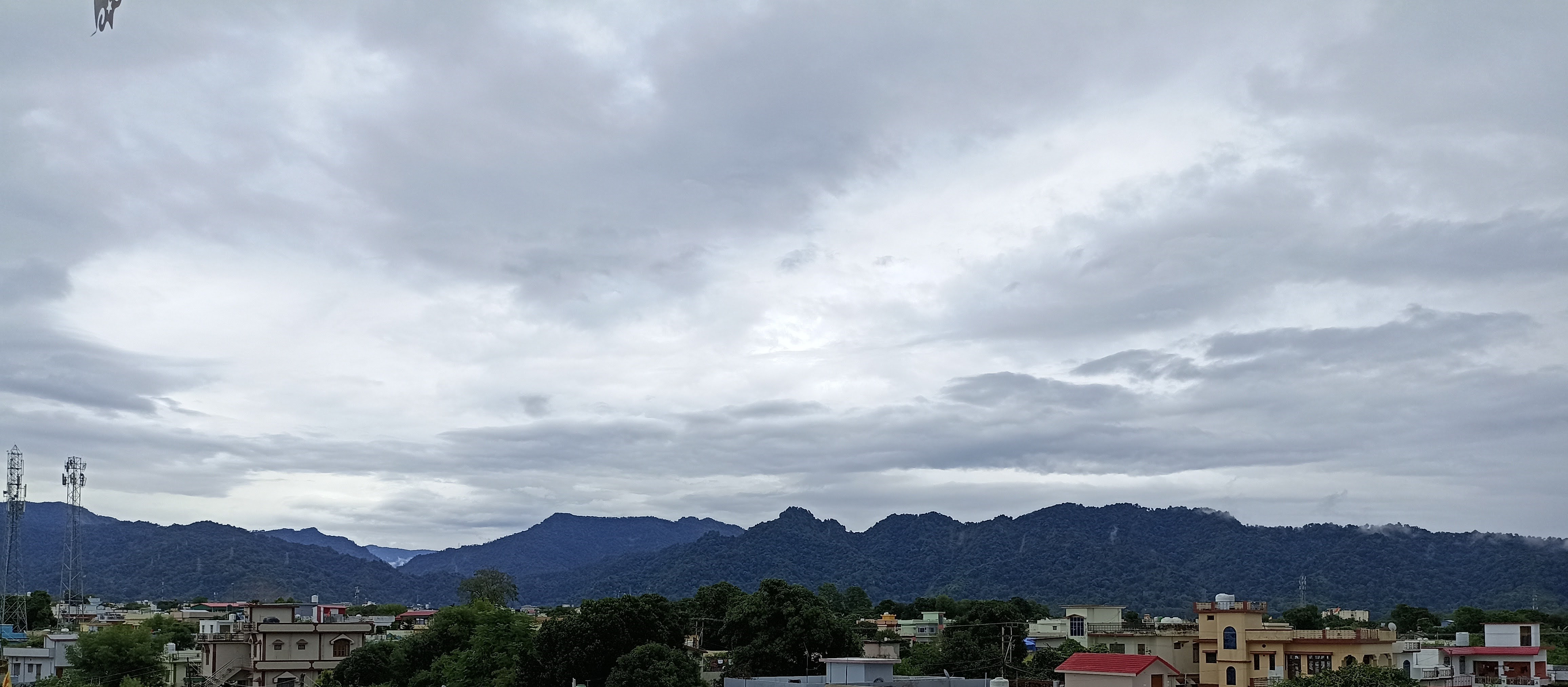
View of Charekh Forest and other hills from the city

=== Jim Corbett National Park ===
Jim Corbett National Park is one of the oldest national parks in India, covering 1,318 km2. Bengal Tigers, leopards, deer, elephants, and bears can be easily seen in the park. On 27 November 2017, Chief Minister Trivendra Singh Rawat inaugurated the Jim Corbett National Park entry from Kotdwar. Ecotourism and operation of safari vehicles attract many tourists to Kotdwar and other Garhwal regions.

=== Kanvashram ===
Kanvashram is an important place both historically, culturally and archaeologically in the history of India. It is located on the bank of river Malini about 14 km from Kotdwar. It is believed that Indra, the king of Gods, was scared by Sage Vishwamitra's meditation, sent a beautiful heavenly damsel named Menaka to the earth to disrupt his meditation. She succeeded in disturbing Vishwamitra's meditation. With their union, she gave birth to a girl child. Menka having succeeded in her purpose left the child on the bank of river Malini and went back to her heavenly abode. This child was found by sage Kanva and brought up in his ashram called Kanvashram. She was named Shakuntala by the sage. She later married the King of this region named Dushyanta. She gave birth to a boy child who was called Bharata, the prince after whom India was named as Bharatavarsha. About 10,000 pupils used to get an education in the ashram of Kanva Rishi in ancient time and since then the valley or ghati is known as Kanvaghati. [self-published source?]

=== Sidhbali Temple ===
At a distance of 3.4 km from Kotdwar's main market i.e. from Bus stand and Railway Station, the Siddhabali temple is dedicated to Lord Hanuman. The temple is located on the bank river Khoh, almost 50 meters above from the river bank. A large number of devotees visit the place round the year, including Hindus and people from other communities.

=== Durga Devi Temple ===
Situated at a distance of 10 km from the main town, the Durga Devi temple is one of the most important places of worship of the town. Durga Devi temple attracts numerous visitors traveling to Lansdowne. Durga Devi temple is situated 11 km ahead Kotdwar and 4 km before Duggada.

Durga Devi Temple is located in Near Kotdwar. Durga Devi Temple is located at 11 km from Kotdwar bus stand, on the road to Dugadda. One more famous temple located in Kotdwar is Sidhhabali Temple.

=== Koteshwar Mahadev ===
Situated at an elevation of 1428 m, this temple has a great following among childless couples. The temple houses a Shivling and is surrounded by the Himalayan ranges in the east, Haridwar in the west and Siddha Pith Medanpuri Devi temple in the south. Legends have it that a village woman inadvertently hit a Shivling while digging, divine voices were then heard, directing the people to construct a temple dedicated to Lord Shiva. Accordingly, the Koteshwar Mahadev temple was erected. It is believed that childless couples who chant the Mahamrityunjaya mantra (verse) during the whole month of Shravana with full faith and devotion are blessed by the Lord and their wishes are granted. It is also believed that during the Navratras the Goddess roves around, sitting upon her steed, the lion. Kotdwar is also known as the entrance towards Himalayas of Uttarakhand.

=== Medanpuri Devi ===
Situated at an elevation of 1657 m, the temple is popularly known as the Medanpuri Devi temple. 'Medan' literally means "curd," and it is believed that the Goddess showers Her devotees with milk, curd, and whey by way of blessings. Legend has it that the Goddess had appeared in a curd-bowl in the hearth of a family living in village Marora. The Goddess revealed to the head of the family the place where she would appear and a temple dedicated to the Goddess was then erected in her honor. Special offerings are made during the Navratras, followed by a big fair on Ashtami. Jeeps and taxis are available at Rishikesh (37 km), Chandighat and Haridwar (42 km). Accommodation is available in Tourist Rest Houses at Chila (36 km).

=== Tarkeshwar Temple ===
This is an ancient temple dedicated to Lord Shiva surrounded by thick Cedar trees. It is located 38 km (24 mi) from Lansdowne at an altitude of 1,800 m (5,900 ft) to the northeast of Lansdowne on-road Lansdowne-Deriyakhal. Tarkeshwar temple is one of the most visited tourist places in the district and is approximately 75–80 km (47–50 mi) from Tarkeshwar Temple. It is surrounded by deodar trees. The way to Tarkeshwar Temple was diverted from Chaukhuliyakhal to Bironkhal highway.

=== St. Joseph's Church ===
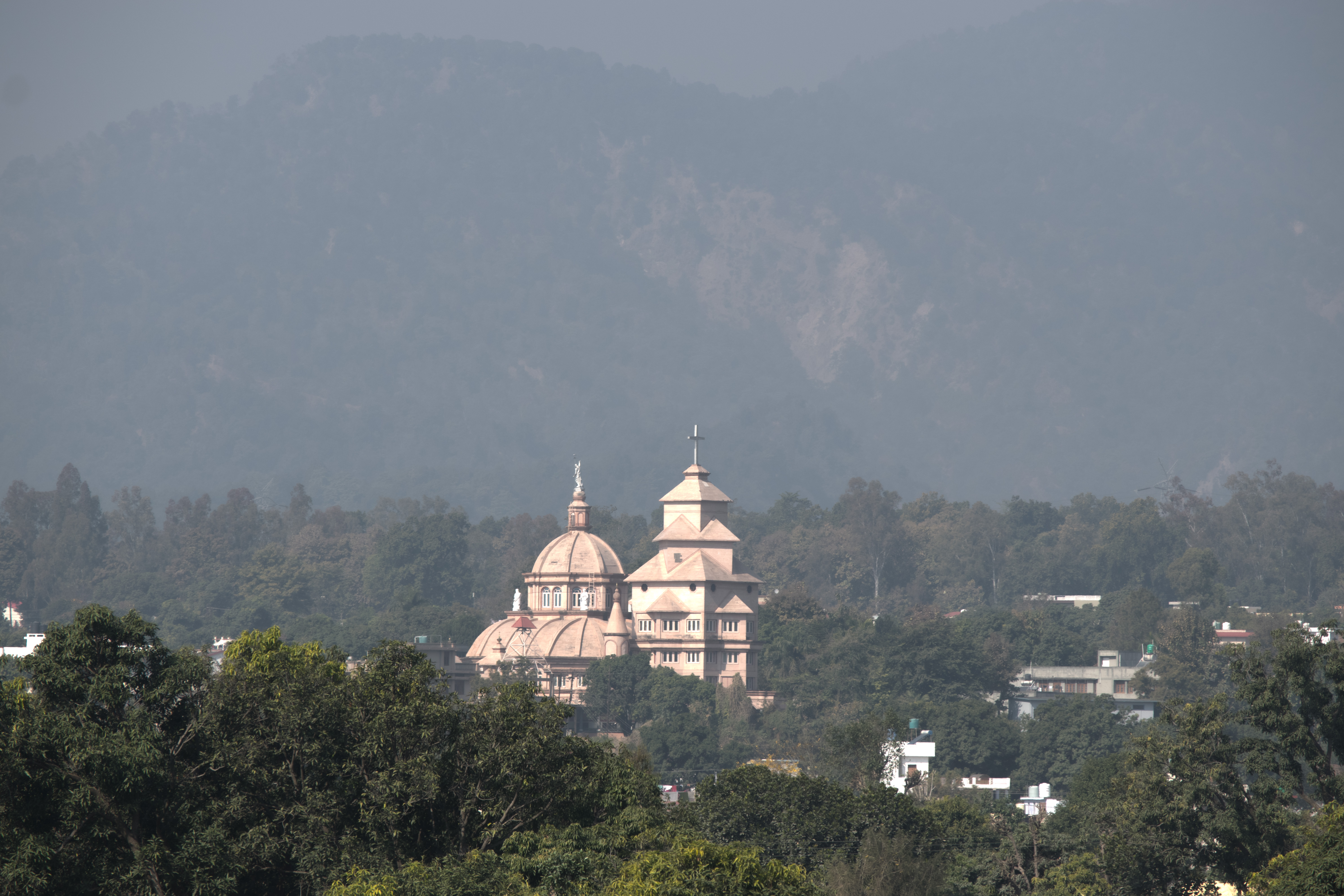
St. Joseph's Church

At a distance of 1.3 km (0.81 mi) from Kotdwar bus stand, this is Asia's second largest church at this altitude. It is opened every day for people from all communities.

=== Shoonya Shikhar Ashram ===
This is a spiritual center near Kotdwara. One can reach it by 7 km of trekking from village Balli, which is itself around 30 km uphill from Kotdwara. Shoonya Shikar Ashram is known for the meditation cave of Sadguru Sadafaldeo Ji Maharaj. This is the place where Swarved was written. It attracts people from all over the world, in particular the followers of Vihangam Yoga, who seek high-level meditation.

=== Charekh Danda ===
Charkanya Shikhar, locally known as 'Charekh Danda', was once the heavenly abode of the great sage, Maharishi Charak. It was here that Maharishi Charak compiled the granth or book called 'Nighut' which possessed valuable information about the medicinal plants that were indigenous to the Himalaya. This is 20 km from Kotdwara. There are views of Kotdwara city and Himalaya from this site.
