= Uttar Pradesh Recovery of Damages to Public and Private Property Act, 2020 =

The Uttar Pradesh Recovery of Damages to Public and Private Property Act, 2020

Governor of Uttar Pradesh
- Citation: UP Ordinance No.2 of 2020
- Territorial extent: Uttar Pradesh
- Enacted by: Governor of Uttar Pradesh
- Enacted: 15 March 2020

Legislative history
- Introduced by: CM Yogi Adityanath
- First reading: 22 August 2020

Related legislation
- Haryana Recovery of Damages to Property During Disturbance of Public Order Act

Summary
- It aims at dealing with "all acts of violence at public places and to control its persistence and escalation, and to provide for the recovery of damage to public or private property during hartal, bundh, riots, public commotion or protests."
- Status: In force

The Uttar Pradesh Recovery of Damages to Public and Private Property Act, 2020 (Hindi: Lok Tatha Niji Sampatti Kashti Vsooli Adhyadesh, 2020) is a law in the Indian state of Uttar Pradesh that was promulgated by the state governor, Anandiben Patel, on 15 March 2020. It was passed by the Uttar Pradesh Legislative Assembly on 22 August 2020.

The Act aims at "recovery of damage to public or private property during hartal, bandhs, riots, protests etc through those accused through claim tribunals with no judicial review by any other court. Deviating from the normal legal process in India wherein the burden of proof lies on the accuser (Investigating Agencies), this ordinance expects the accused to present evidence of innocence from alleged crimes, on account of simply them being named as accused. The Supreme Court of India had said in 2007 that a "strong law" was needed to deal with the damage to property during political protests. Following the CAA protests in UP, the state government has been finding ways to clamp down on the protesters and recover damages to public property.

It has been challenged in Allahabad High Court.
