= Vijaya Barthwal =

Indian politician (born 1952)

Cabinet Minister of Women Welfare, Child Welfare and Development, Government of Uttarakhand
- In office (2007–2012)
- Constituency: Yamkeshwar

MLA
- In office 3 times (2002–2017)
- Preceded by: N/A
- Succeeded by: Ritu Khanduri

Cabinet Minister for Village Development, Government of Uttarakhand
- In office (2007–2012)

Cabinet Minister for Culture, Government of Uttarakhand
- In office (2007–2012)

1st Deputy Speaker, Government of Uttarakhand
- In office (2008–2009)
- Succeeded by: Anusuya Prasad Maikhuri (2012)

Chairperson Uttarakhand State Women's Commission
- In office (2018–2021)
- Succeeded by: Kusum Kandwal

Personal details
- Born: May 1952 (age 74) Pauri Garhwal
- Party: Bharatiya Janata Party
- Spouse: Chandramohan Barthwal(died 2013)
- Children: 3 including Pragati (Daughter), Pranav (son) and Priyank (son)
- Relatives: Grandchildren: Ahana Barthwal,Yuvaan Barthwal
- Website: https://www.facebook.com/vijaya.barthwal

Vijaya Barthwal is an Indian politician from the Bhartiya Janta Party. She was one of the most senior and active politician in Uttarakhand. She was a three term Member of the Legislative Assembly and had represented Yamkeshwar assembly constituency of Pauri Garhwal, Uttarakhand. She was in the Cabinet of chief minister B. C. Khanduri and Ramesh Pokhriyal's government. She is also served as the first deputy speaker of Uttarakhand Legislative Assembly.

== Career ==
Vijaya began her career from the political party Bharatiya Janata Party and elected first time as Member of the Legislative Assembly in 2002. Later she won as a candidate of Bharatiya Janata Party in the 2007 and 2012 Uttarakhand Assembly Election.

She never lost any election in her career. In 2017 assembly elections barthwal was denied party ticket and BJP decided to field Ritu Khanduri daughter of former uttarakhand chief minister instead of her against huge public outrage. Barthwal was the only women BJP MLA in the third assembly and holds an image of down to earth political worker. Barthwal filed the nomination to fight as an independent candidate but later withdrew her nomination supporting her party's decision.

== Chairperson State Women Commission ==
On 22 December 2018, Senior BJP leader Vijay Barthwal has been made the chairperson of Uttarakhand State Women's commission. Barthwal was expected to be accommodated since she was denied the Assembly ticket from Yamkeshwar Assembly segment in 2017 despite being a sitting MLA. The party had fielded Ritu Khanduri, daughter of former Chief Minister B C Khanduri, from the constituency who had won. Here tenure as Uttarakhand State Women Commission chairperson ended in December 2021.

== Cabinet minister ==
In 2007, Barthwal took oath as a Cabinet minister for Village Development, Culture, Women welfare and Child Development in Khanduri's Government and again in Nishank's Government uptill 2012 .

== Deputy Speaker ==
BJP MLA Vijaya Barthawal was unanimously elected the first deputy speaker of Uttarakhand Legislative Assembly.

The BJP MLA from Yamkeshwar assembly seat in Pauri district, Barthawal, was elected the first deputy speaker of the state assembly with the main Opposition Indian National Congress and Bahujan Samaj Party decided not to field any candidate against her.

After the formal announcement of her election by the assembly Speaker Harbans Kapoor, the ruling party members including leader of the house and Chief Minister B C Khanduri greeted Barthawal saying, getting elected, as a woman, for this high constitutional post is a step forward towards the women empowerment in the state.

However, the main Opposition Indian National Congress and Bahujan Samaj Party members abstained on the occasion.

Leaders of both the parties said they decided not to field any candidates against Barthwal as they do not have enough number in the house to win the election.

They also criticised the ruling Bharatiya Janata Party for not following the healthy traditions of a parliamentary democracy and said that the post of deputy speaker goes to the opposition by convention.

There was no deputy speaker in Uttarakhand since the state was formed in November 2000.
