= Shailendra Singh Rawat =

Indian politician

Mayor of Kotdwar Municipal Corporation
- Incumbent
- Assumed office 7 February 2025
- Preceded by: Hemlata Negi

Member of the Uttarakhand Legislative Assembly
- In office 2007–2012
- Preceded by: Surendra Singh Negi
- Succeeded by: Surendra Singh Negi
- Constituency: Kotdwar

Personal details
- Party: Bharatiya Janata Party

Shailendra Singh Rawat is an Indian politician and a member of the Bharatiya Janata Party. He is the current mayor of Kotdwar and a former member of the Uttarakhand Legislative Assembly. Rawat represented the Kotdwar Assembly constituency in Uttarakhand as a member of the Bharatiya Janata Party.
