= Gargi College molestations =

Sexual assault on women students inside a campus in India

On 6 February 2020, at around 6:30 pm, a group of intoxicated men entered the campus of Gargi College, a women's college affiliated to University of Delhi. The incidents happened during the annual cultural fest of the college, Reverie. Reportedly, some students were sexually assaulted by members of the mob. It was also reported that some of the men masturbated in front of the female students.

An FIR was registered by the principal of Gargi College three days later. A fact-finding committee was created by the college administration to gather relevant information on the incidents.

The Delhi Police said an inspector of Crime Against Women (CAW) Cell was designated as the investigation officer in the case and the Additional DCP of South Delhi was designated as the inquiry officer. Police arrested 10 suspects on 12 February 2020, and two more 13 February 2020. Police later arrested five more suspects, bringing the number of arrests to seventeen as of 18 February 2020. On 14 February 2020, the initial ten accused were released on bail.

== The incidents ==
The annual cultural fest of Gargi College was scheduled to hold from 4 to 6 February 2020. On 6 February 2020, the final day, a music concert was organised for which playback singer Jubin Nautiyal was invited to perform. The crowd began to form around 3:30 pm around both gates of the campus. Entry was scheduled to close after 4:30 pm. Since the college is a women's college, men are only allowed to enter with passes. Reportedly the gates remained open for a longer time and identifications and passes were not properly checked for the men's entry. Some reports say that the gate was not damaged at first, an administration official had opened the gates to give entry to a car, and many people rushed inside. The influx of the crowd continued for hours. It was reported that 5,000 to 10,000 individuals gathered in and around the campus. According to organisers, the expected crowd was around 6000, 3000 college students and around 3000 more through entry passes.

According to the eye-witnesses' testimonies and social media posts, the mob entered around 6:30 pm. One report said that the men were middle-aged and came in trucks. Students said that those men did not appear to be students, and some reports claimed the men were returning from a pro-CAA rally who were shouting "Jai Shri Ram". This mob destroyed the campus gates, and some of them climbed over the walls and damaged students' vehicles. The men walked around drunk and shirtless. They brought with them alcohol, cigarettes and weed. They assaulted women and chased them. One student told NDTV that she wanted to report verbal harassment to the Proctor but she could not as signal jammers were installed for the fest. Some students noted that the incursion appeared to be planned, as some of the men carried eggs and threw them at the students.

One student said the crowd was "massive" and she was unable to move out and had to stay inside the campus for 40 minutes. When she went out in an open space, one of the men started masturbating at her. As soon as she escaped, a first-year student ran to her and said that a group of five or six men appeared to be attempting to surround her. Some of the students posted on social media that they were followed to their hostels and accommodations, and some were followed to the metro station when they left the campus.

=== Security lapse and police inaction ===
The students alleged that college security personnel were present and when they observed the incidents, they did not intervene, even when specifically asked to do so.

The Economic Times reported that the Rapid Action Force (RAF) and Delhi Police personnel were stationed close to the entrance of the campus from where the mob entered the college. Students said the RAF and police personnel did nothing.

== Aftermath ==
The incident came to mainstream media when students posted narrations of their experiences in Instagram. Around 100 students protested outside the gate of the college from 10 February until 16 February 2020, sitting for dharna from 10 a.m. to 2 p.m. to demand an apology from the college principal, assurance of a safe campus and action against the perpetrators. They alleged that even after the incidents were brought to the notice of the college management, they did not take any necessary steps. Delhi University Teachers’ Association (DUTA) supported the students and joined the protest.

Some of the students who were harassed complained to the principal and others. The principal, Dr. Kumar was reportedly heard saying, "Why come to the fests, if you do not feel safe." The students' Union blamed the administration and called the Principal's statement "infuriating and appalling". A girl stated, "It was scary and traumatic, and the administration refused to help."

=== Commissions for Women ===
The Delhi Commission for Women (DCW) Chief, Swati Maliwal interviewed some of the students and asked the Principal Dr. Kumar to appear before the commission.

The National Commission for Women (NCW) also sent investigators. The NCW Chairperson, Rekha Sharma said that she had read about the molestations on social media and sent a team to talk with the principal and also to the Delhi Police.

== Police investigation ==
On 10 February 2020, after three days of the incidents, Dr. Promila Kumar, the principal of Gargi College, made a complaint at the Hauz Khas Police Station. A FIR was registered and the case was lodged under sections 452 (trespass), 354 (assault or criminal force intend to outrage modesty of women) and 509 (criminal intimidation) and 34 (acts done by several persons in furtherance of common intention) of Indian Penal Code.

Also on 10 February 2020, the DCP of South Delhi stated that a police inspector of the Crime Against Women (CAW) Cell had been designated as investigation officer in the case while the Additional DCP of South Delhi, Geetanjali Khandelwal, would oversee the investigation. On 12 February 2020, the Commissioner of Police (South Delhi), Atul Kumar Thakur stated that 11 teams of Delhi Police were working on the case. Police collected evidence and statements from witnesses and scanned CCTV footage from the cameras at the college gate to get evidence. CCTV footage revealed that some of the men broke the college gate to gain access, while some jumped over barricades. The security team at the gate was outnumbered by the mob. Some suspects were identified using this footage.

=== Petition for court-monitored CBI inquiry ===
On 13 February 2020, a lawyer filed a PIL in the Supreme Court, seeking a court-monitored Central Bureau of Investigation (CBI) inquiry into the alleged molestation and sought arrest of the perpetrators behind the "planned criminal conspiracy". The petitioner told the court that it could be a "criminal conspiracy hatched by the political party" and raised concerns that the electronic evidence could be destroyed. In response, the top court said that the Delhi High Court can pass an order for the authorities to preserve the evidence. Though the court had refused to entertain the petition and directed the petitioner to move the same to the Delhi High Court. Thus the PIL moved to the High Court, where the court has agreed to hear the petition and listed for hearing on 17 February 2020.

=== Identification and arrests ===
On 12 February 2020, Delhi Police said that 30 suspects were identified and arrested ten students in connection to the alleged assaults. The police stated that the accused were for the most part local university students. A day later, police arrested two more people. On 14 February, the initial ten accused were granted bail by a Delhi court and were released on a surety of रु 10,000 each. Police said the CCTV footage that they have only establishes the arrested persons "barging into the college premises by damaging a gate" but not their involvement in molestation.

The police arrested one more person on 16 February and two on 18 February, for a total of seventeen arrests.

== Reaction from political leaders ==
Chief Minister of Delhi, Arvind Kejriwal condemned the misbehavior with the women students and tweeted that the incident was "extremely unfortunate" and the accused must be brought to justice. Deputy CM of Delhi, Manish Sisodia called the incidents as "disgusting". Sisodia mentioned in his tweet that "fests are opportunities to celebrate the cultural diversity" but "anti-social elements saw this fest as another chance to inflict harassment and violence on students". BJP chief, Manoj Tiwari tweeted that the incident is highly condemnable and culprits should be apprehended immediately.

Delhi Congress president Subhash Chopra said that he was "anguished by the Gargi college incident". He tweeted that it is "sorrowful that the girl students are not safe in their own college in the national capital". He also mentioned in his tweet that "highly shameful that Delhi Police silently watched the atrocities against women."

During the Question Hour of Lok Sabha in response to fellow MP, Gaurav Gogoi's question, HRD Minister of India, Ramesh Pokhriyal said the perpetrators were from outside and were not students and said that the college administration was advised to take action into the matter.

== See also ==
- Campus sexual assault
- Measures of campus sexual assault
- Blank Noise
- 2012 Guwahati molestation case
- List of sexual abuses perpetrated by groups
- Mass sexual assault
- Sexual abuse by yoga gurus
