= Hindutva pop =

Hindutva music genre

- Other names: H-Pop
- Cultural origins: 1980s – 1990s, India

Hindutva pop, often referred to as H-Pop, is a genre of Indian pop music that promotes Hindutva, a Hindu nationalist ideology. The music has become increasingly popular in the 2010s and 2020s and frequently includes Islamophobic lyrics. The songs have sometimes been played on loudspeakers by Hindutva groups during violent attacks on Indian Muslims.

== History ==
=== Roots ===
In the 1980s and 1990s, the Ram janmabhoomi movement distributed audio-cassette tapes that included Hindutva speeches intermixed with music. One was entitled "Mandir ka nirman karo" ("Build the temple"). Despite some of the tapes being banned by the authorities, many copies were sold. The tapes have been credited with contributing to anti-Muslim violence.

Hindutva pop, including the music of Laxmi Dubey and Prem Krishnavanshi, became increasingly popular after the Bharatiya Janata Party (BJP) came to power in 2014 and Narendra Modi became Prime Minister. A few years later, Yogi Adityanath, accused of inciting violence, and Sadhvi Pragya, accused of participating in the 2008 Malegaon Blasts, were elected to government office. Professor Anirban K. Baishya has pointed to these events as examples of the "mainstreamization" of Hindutva ideals and imagery that have contributed to the increasing popularity of Hindutva pop. Similarly, Professor Badri Narayan has stated: "Hindutva has changed in the common sense. People have a sense of history and it reaches more popularity through music.”

In 2015, a Muslim man was lynched in Dadri, Uttar Pradesh for allegedly eating beef. The arrests of 18 men in connection with the crime were resented by many local residents. This incident and the 2017 election of Yogi Adityanath contributed to the increasing popularity of Upendra Rana, a local Hindutva pop singer.

In February 2019, a suicide bomber killed 40 Indian paramilitary soldiers in the Pulwama area of Kashmir. Kavi Singh credits the attack with inspiring her Hindutva pop music career. She recorded a song, "Pulwama mein veeron ne jo jaan desh pe vaari hai" ("The Sacrifices by Our Martyrs in Pulwama"), which blamed Kashmiri Muslims for the attack and called to "finish off that traitor". After the song quickly went viral on WhatsApp, Singh recorded a music video which also went viral.

=== Communal Violence ===
In April 2017, a Rama Navami procession in Gumla, Jharkhand stopped in front of a mosque and played a Hindutva pop song, leading participants to chant Hindu slogans and provoking Muslims in the area. The police prevented an immediate escalation by stopping the music. A few hours later, some Hindu men who had attended the procession lynched a Muslim man, Mohammad Shalik, after seeing him with a Hindu woman.

In April 2022, a Hindutva pop song by Sandeep Chaturvedi was played in Karauli, Rajasthan, during a Hindu New Year celebration. The song threatens violence against "skull-cap wearers", i.e. Muslims. After the procession passed through a Muslim neighborhood, the worst communal violence in the city since Partition erupted, leading to damaged property, injuries of at least 35 people, and arrests of 29 people.

Around the same time in Khargone, Madhya Pradesh, a Rama Navami procession played Hindutva pop outside a mosque before attacking and burning the homes of several Muslims. One of the music tracks was created for the event and mixed "Jai Shri Ram" chants with the sounds of a Hindu woman being attacked from the controversial film The Kashmir Files. More than 24 people were injured in the violence.

In March 2023, a Rama Navami procession in Bihar Sharif, Bihar, burned several Muslim buildings, including a 110 year old library with historical texts. Local residents reported that the mob played Hindutva pop songs, including one with the lyrics: "Kill them or send them to Pakistan". According to the police, the attack was pre-planned via a WhatsApp group.

== Themes and Content ==
H-pop songs often feature catchy dance beats, violent lyrics, and low production values. The vocals are often auto-tuned and performed by untrained singers. H-pop music videos have been described as "garish", "amateurish", and "poorly-synced"; they often feature weaponry and Hindu gods. Typically Hindutva pop songs are in Hindi, but some have also been composed in other languages. Many songs feature the Hindu phrase: "Jai Shri Ram". Singers often wear Hindu symbols: including tilaka, marigold garlands, and saffron clothing.

Hindutva pop features a range of Hindu nationalist and anti-Muslim themes. Some songs praise BJP leaders like Narendra Modi or Yogi Adityanath, including songs urging fans to vote for Modi in the 2024 elections. After Modi revoked the special status of Jammu and Kashmir, there were songs celebrating the decision and songs about Hindus moving to Kashmir and marrying Kashmiri women. Other songs glorify historical Hindu leaders or promote casteism. Some songs encourage Hindus to take pride in their religion or call for a Hindu rashtra.

Some songs threaten Muslims and mosques with violence, often accusing Muslims of loyalty to Pakistan or warning against love jihad or decrying the demographic threat of Muslims. One of Laxmi Dubey's most popular songs includes the lyric: "Hindustan me rehna hoga, Vande Mataram kehna hoga" ("If you want to stay in India, praise the motherland"). One popular song, Kavi Singh's "Agar chhua mandir toh tujhe dikha denge" ("Don’t Dare Touch the Temple"), threatens Muslims with violence if they touch or look at Hindu temples. Another popular song, Sandeep Acharya's "Aabar Babar Ke Naam se Awadh Me Savchalaye Banwaunga" ("I'll get a toilet made in the name of Babur in Awadh"), references Babri Masjid, a 16th century mosque that was destroyed in 1992. The video features images of people cleaning toilets and children defecating, while the lyrics threaten to make Muslims clean toilets.

In one song, Prem Krishnavanshi addresses Muslims: "Insaan nahi ho saalon ho tum kasai, Bohot hua ab hindu muslim bhai bhai" ("You are not humans but butchers, enough of this Hindu-Muslim brotherhood”). In another song, Krishnavanshi praises BJP leader Yogi Adityanath. These two songs have been called "street anthems for right-wing supporters, who chant these verses while passing through Muslim dominated neighbourhoods".

== Impact ==
=== Violence against Muslims ===
Hindutva pop has been credited with inspiring and normalizing violence against Muslims in India. Hindutva songs are sometimes played at religious gatherings that are followed by violent attacks on Muslim communities. H-pop has been compared to Radio Rwanda and Radio Télévision Libre des Mille Collines, both Hutu Power radio stations active during the Rwandan genocide, and Nazi songs. Professor Brahma Prakash has stated that playing Hindutva pop "will move the mobs and make them participate in massacre. You don’t need an instigator to incite violence. You set the tone, you set the track and the hate will rock." Professor Anirban K. Baishya has argued that Hindutva pop probably doesn't "directly contribute to" violence, but it "normalizes hatred and dehumanization".

However, some Hindutva pop singers have denied hating Muslims. Laxmi Dubey has stated that she only opposes Muslims who support Pakistan and that she respects all religions, while Sanjay Faizabadi has stated that he only opposes terrorists. Prem Krishnavanshi has stated that he does not want to hurt Muslims, while Ved Vyas has argued: "Had my songs preached violence or hatred then riots would have taken place almost everywhere but nothing such has happened. No one has been harmed."

=== Popularity ===
Hindutva pop music is especially popular within India's Hindi belt of Northern India, considered to be a Hindutva stronghold. Hindutva songs are frequently posted to YouTube, where some have been viewed millions of times. One popular Hindutva song by Laxmi Dubey, "Har Ghar Bhagwa Chayega" ("Every House Shall Turn Saffron"), has been played more than 65 million times online. As of May 2024, Dubey had around 500,000 subscribers. As of June 2023, Upendra Rana had 478,000 subscribers.

== Response ==
=== YouTube ===
YouTube has been criticized for auto-generating Hindutva music videos and for failing to adequately moderate Hindutva pop music that violates its policies against hatred and violence. YouTube has removed various accounts and videos created by Hindutva pop singers such as Sandeep Acharya and Prem Krishnvanshi for violating their hate speech policies. However, their videos continue to be re-uploaded and re-mixed by other users.

=== Government and Politicians ===
Singers like Laxmi Dubey and Upendra Rana frequently perform for politicians. Dubey has stated: "We go wherever B.J.P. leaders invite us to perform. That’s because the B.J.P. is helping to propagate Hindutva." According to Kavi Singh, the BJP asked her to create a song to support Modi's re-election in 2024, and she regularly campaigns for BJP politicians. BJP politician Raja Singh has played or performed Hindutva pop songs at his rallies, while former BJP MP Dinesh Lal Yadav has recorded his own H-pop music video.

In 2022, Prem Krishnavanshi was given an award by the Uttar Pradesh government for a song about Yogi Adityanath. A BJP spokesperson stated that the award was given for the song's artistic merit and that it was not an endorsement. The founder of Muslim Mirror has said that the government fully supports Hindutva pop singers. Professor Amir Ali has stated that H-pop "reinforces the electoral and political dominance of the BJP."

The government and police have been criticized for not taking sufficient action to suppress H-pop or prosecute its singers for "promoting hatred between religious groups." Some officers have attempted to control playlists at Hindu religious events to prevent violence. Some officers have said that suppressing H-pop is challenging because of how easy it is to access and upload. Journalist Kunal Purohit wrote that the police sometimes ban the playing of music instead of trying to resolve the source of the problem.

In 2019, four people were arrested for a viral YouTube music video after the police received multiple complaints. The song was entitled: “Jo Na Bole Jai Shri Ram, Usko Bhejo Kabristan” ("Those who refuse to chant Jai Sri Ram should be sent to the graveyard").

In January 2023, Deutsche Welle produced a news report about Hindutva pop, calling it "soundtrack of hate" and featuring H-pop singers Sandeep Acharya and Prem Krishnvanshi. In response, a BJP spokesperson stated that her party has no connection to the singers and does not promote hatred. She recommended that anyone offended should file a police report against the singers.

== See also ==
- Saffronisation
- National Socialist black metal
- White power music
- Racist music
- Hate media
