= 2022 Khargone violence =

Communal violence broke out in Khargone on April 10, 2022

- Part of Religious violence in India, Bulldozer politics
- Date: 10 April 2022
- Location: Talab Chowk, Khargone, Madhya Pradesh, India
- Caused by: Conflict during Shobha Yatra on Ram Navami
- Methods: Arson, Stone Pelting

Casualties
- Deaths: 1
- Injuries: 20, including an SP
- Arrested: 175
- Damage: 30 buildings and vehicles burnt 16 homes and 32 shops demolished

On 10 April 2022, a clash between Hindus and Muslims occurred in the city of Khargone, Madhya Pradesh. It took place between 5:00 pm and 6:00 pm, in the midst of a Ram Navami procession organised by a Hindu nationalist organisation allied to the ruling Bharatiya Janata Party (BJP). At 5:00 pm, when Muslims were gathering for evening prayers at the neighbouring Jama Masjid, the procession had not yet departed from the city's central Talab Chowk area.

Stones were pelted by both sides, houses and vehicles were set on fire, and several shots were fired, in which multiple people were injured, including a police officer. By the next day, 77 people, mostly Muslim, were arrested and a temporary curfew was imposed. Several days later, the number of people arrested climbed to 175, of whom only 14 were not Muslim.

The BJP state government retaliated by demolishing the establishments where violence erupted, mostly those of Muslims. The Chief Minister of Madhya Pradesh, Shivraj Singh Chouhan of the Bharatiya Janata Party, said the government would take "strict action" against the rioters. He defended the decision to demolish properties and said it was intended to "instil fear of financial losses among the accused". The government was criticized for its apparent attempts to deliver 'bulldozer justice'.

== Background ==
The Hindu festival of Ram Navami, a celebration of the Hindu deity Rama's birth, occurs on the ninth day (Navami) of the Chaitra month of the Hindu calendar, usually between March and April. In the year 2022, the festival fell during the Muslim holy month of Ramadan, a form of synchronisation that occurs roughly once every 33 years. On the day of Ram Navami, large processions called Shobha Yatras were held by the Sangh Parivar Hindu nationalists across India, and numerous Hindu–Muslim clashes occurred. The Hindu nationalist Bharatiya Janata Party (BJP) holding power in India has been blamed for the religious polarisation that led to the clashes.

Khargone had an early infusion of Hindu nationalist politics when an RSS branch was set up in 1939. After India gained independence from the United Kingdom in 1947, Indian National Congress politician Ram Chandra Bade switched to the Bharatiya Jana Sangh, the precursor of the modern Bharatiya Janata Party, and won the legislative assembly seat of Khargone in 1952. He won the Lok Sabha seat in 1962. Despite winning several elections since then, the (BJP) has been not been as successful in recent years, having lost 9 out of 10 seats in the region in the 2018 Legislative Assembly elections. Opposition parties accused it of having made efforts to instigate communal violence in order to regain political advantage. During the previous years, over half a dozen incidents occurred where mosques and Muslims were targeted during festivals.

Residents said that free screenings of the film The Kashmir Files had been arranged in Khargone in March 2022. Reviews of the film had noted its depiction of graphic violence as decontextualized, one-sided and islamophobic.

== Incidents ==
=== Processions ===
A community of Raghuvanshis located in Khargone, who claim descent from Rama, organise Ram Navami processions at Khargone every year. On 10 April 2022, their procession began at the Talab Chowk area, the location of the town's jama masjid, (Note: A jama masjid is the main mosque of a town, typically located in the centre of the town close to the residential and shopping districts of a Muslim community.) at around 11:00 am and ended at the Ram temple by noon without incident.

However, the BJP state vice-president Shyam Mahajan was unhappy that the police had barricaded the Muslim localities near Talab Chowk. He was reported to have had a heated argument with the police superintendent and threatened to remove him from his position. After the argument, a rumour was allegedly spread that the police had stopped the procession at Talab Chowk. The BJP leader is claimed to have instigated the crowd, asking them to gather for a second procession to be organised by the Gauraksha Samiti later in the afternoon.

The Gauraksha Samiti (literally "Cow Protection Society") of Khargone was reportedly formed in 2019, after the BJP losses in the Legislative Assembly elections. It consisted of leaders from BJP and other right-wing groups. The organisers of the second procession used the controversial film The Kashmir Files to instigate the local Hindu community. The film's climactic scene of a Hindu woman being cut up by a mechanical saw was recreated with makeshift devices and placed on a tractor trolley. The back of the trolley displayed a picture of Anupam Kher's character in the film along with the slogan, "Wake up Hindus, lest other states in India become Kashmir." The soundtrack of the film with the woman's sobs was remixed with a music track containing cries of "Jai Shri Ram" and "Har Har Mahadev".

The procession had permission to start at Talab Chowk between 2:00 pm and 3:00 pm; however, the procession had not departed even until 5:00 pm, when Muslims were gathering for Ramadan prayers at the neighbouring Jama Masjid. Video recordings showed disc jockeys playing raucous music and processionists spilling over into nearby streets, some waving Ram Rajya flags. About 1,000 people participated in the procession. They were carrying swords, sticks and saffron flags.

=== Clashes ===
At around 5:00 pm and 6:00 pm, stone pelting started. The Hindu processionists accused the Muslims of attacking them. They claim stones were pelted from the terraces behind the local mosque. Muslims said that the members of the procession first threw stones at the police. Others admitted stone-pelting from both the sides.

Others taking part in the second Ram Navami procession said that they were agitated by those leaving the mosque after performing namaz. "There was a tremendous throng," a participant in the march stated. "We had made elaborate preparations for this year's Ram Navami, but at the Talab Chowk, stones were thrown at us, forcing us to defend ourselves."

According to Hafiz Mohammad Mohsin, secretary of the Talab Chowk Jama Masjid, stone-pelting occurred from both sides. He accused the Hindus of instigating of Muslims. "Previously, we have notified the government and written to the PMO that the Talab Chowk near the Jama Masjid is a sensitive zone," he added. "Communal squabbles are common around here. Stones are also thrown at the masjid, thus such processions or celebrations should be prohibited in order to maintain communal peace."

Police responded with lathi charge and tear gas shelling. This caused the crowd to disperse into adjoining neighbourhoods, including Qazipura, Tavdi Mohalla, Sanjay Nagar, Gaushala Marg, Anand Nagar, Bhausar Mohalla and Khaskhaswadi. Rioting and arson continued until well after midnight.

== Demolitions ==
On the morning of April 11, Madhya Pradesh's home minister Narottam Mishra told reporters in Bhopal, "The houses of those pelting stones will be turned into a pile of stones." By midday, when Khargone was still under curfew, bulldozers began destroying buildings, including a single-room house built on government property with subsidies from the Pradhan Mantri Awas Yojana, the prime minister's housing initiative. Wasim Sheikh, a disabled man, had his tin-shed kiosk destroyed. According to a document given to the media in Bhopal by a senior officer of the state home department, 49 Muslim-owned homes were demolished in Khargone that day.

== Investigation ==
Soon after the incident, police began arresting rioters from different locations. As of 8 May, 182 people have been arrested in 72 cases registered in connection with the clashes. Iqbal Bani, who allegedly incited the violence, was arrested in Kasrawad, located in Khargone district.

== Protests ==
On May 10, 2022, Muslim women in Khargone came out in protest. They alleged that the police were inhumanely treating their friends and family members in the name of the “rule of law”. They claimed that police were acting arbitrarily by raiding the homes of Muslims. “Instead of opening the doors, they crash the doors and ruthlessly beat the male members,” they said. Restrictions were re-imposed in Khargone a day after a group Muslim women rallied. Section 144 was imposed and a joint notification was issued by both the district administration and the police on Wednesday; no rallies, processions, Jagarans and shobha yatras or political rallies were allowed in the district until July 10.

== See also ==
- Ram Navami riots
- 2022 Karauli violence
- 2022 Jahangirpuri violence
- 2025 Cuttack violence

== Bibliography ==
- Jaffrelot, Christophe (1996), The Hindu Nationalist Movement and Indian Politics, C. Hurst & Co. Publishers, ISBN 978-1850653011
