= 2025 Christmas violence in India =

Violence against Christians in India

- Part of the violence against Christians in India
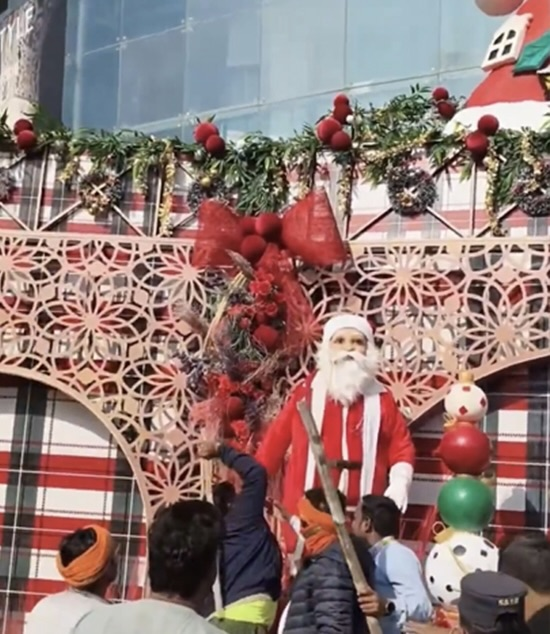
- An attack at the Magneto Mall in Raipur by members of Bajrang Dal.
- Location: Across India
- Date: December 20, 2025- December 25, 2025
- Target: Indian Christians
- Attack type: Vandalism • Arson • Mob violence
- Motive: Anti-Christian sentiment; Hindu extremism

In December 2025, several incidents of violence, vandalism, arson, and disruption of Christmas celebration were reported across multiple states in India. These incidents occurred primarily in Christian institutions, prayer gatherings, and public decorations, often under the pretext of preventing alleged "religious conversions" or preserving "cultural awareness.". These incidents were primarily caused by members of the RSS and other Hindutva right-wing organizations. Notably Bajrang Dal, a militant wing of the Vishwa Hindu Parishad (VHP).

== Background ==
The violence in 2025 occurred during a decade-long backdrop of rising attacks against Christians in India. According to the United Christian Forum, 834 incidents was recorded in 2024, a big jump from just 139 in 2014. By November 2025, there were 706 documented incidents, with Uttar Pradesh (184) and Chhattisgarh (157) leading the list. Of the 579 incidents reported between January and September 2025, only 39 resulted in police cases; with a 93 percent gap in the documentation of these complaint.

== Timeline ==
=== Lead-up to Christmas ===
- Chhattisgarh: Several days before Christmas, a major violent episode broke out in the Kanker district of Chhattisgarh. Between December 15 and 18, a dispute over a Christian burial in the villages of Bade Tevda and Amabeda escalated into a riot. According to reports, a mob exhumed the body of a convert and attacked the local community. During the rampage, multiple churches were set on fire and several Christian homes were destroyed. When police attempted to intervene, the clashes intensified, leaving a prayer hall vandalized and around 20 police members injured.
- Bandh (Shutdown): Following the unrest in the Kanker district of Chhattisgarh, an umbrella body of tribal and social organizations known as the "Sarva Samaj" called for a state-wide bandh (shutdown). The organization demanded strict action against "illegal conversions" and protested what they termed "administrative bias" in handling the Kanker clashes. The United Christian Forum wrote to the Union Home Minister urging the cancellation of the bandh, warning that a shutdown specifically targeting the Christian community on Christmas Eve would lead to unrest.
- Madhya Pradesh: A prayer meeting and feast organized on the occasion of Christmas in the Gorakhpur area of Jabalpur was disrupted by a Hindu group alleging forced religious conversions. The event was attended by a large number of disabled children (from the city's school for the hearing- and visually-impaired). Members of the VHP, Bajrang Dal, and BJP workers arrived at the venue after claiming they received a "tip-off" that religious conversions were being conducted under the guise of the celebration. The situation escalated into a clash between the activists and those attending the event. During the altercation, BJP District Vice President Anju Bhargava was filmed harassing a disabled woman named Safalta Kartik. Kartik later stated that she and her daughter were abused and interrogated about their religion, despite her assertions that she attends the feast annually and that no inducements for conversion were ever offered. This incident was followed by a similar incident in the Shakti Nagar area on December 22.
- Kerala: On the night of December 21, a group of minors singing Christmas carols in Palakkad was attacked by local men. Police later arrested an activist linked to the RSS for destroying the group's musical instruments. Later, the education minister of Kerala V Sivankutty commented that 'schools in Kerala buckled under pressure from right-wing groups to cancel Christmas celebrations.'
- Odisha: In Puri, street vendors selling Santa Claus costumes were targeted and harassed by right-wing activists. The group justified their actions by claiming the land belonged to the Jagannath temple and asserting that items related to Christian festivals should not be sold in a "Hindu nation." The vendors were subsequently forced to 'pack up their stalls' and were asked to 'leave the city.'
- Haridwar: A government-run hotel (UP Tourism) was forced to cancel its "Experience Christmas" event scheduled for December 24. The cancellation came after priests from the Ganga Sabha alongside other Hindu groups protested, claiming that celebrating Christmas near the holy river was "anti-Hindu" and against local traditions.

=== December 24 (Christmas Eve) ===
- Assam: A mob affiliated with the Bajrang Dal and VHP stormed St. Mary's English School in Nalbari. They burned the school's nativity scene and destroyed Christmas decorations, leading to the arrest of four district-level leaders.
- Bareilly: Groups gathered outside a cathedral in Bareilly to protest against the Christmas prayers, alleging that the gathering was a cover for conversions. Amid police presence, the group recited Hanuman Chalisa and shouted 'Jai Sri Ram.'
- Chhattisgarh: On Christmas Eve, a state-wide shutdown (bandh) was being observed by the 'Sarva Samaj' across Chhattisgarh. While the shutdown received a mixed response with support from traders' associations in urban centers, it disrupted daily life. Despite the shutdown, a mob of approximately 40-50 men with rods and hockey sticks entered the Magneto Mall in Raipur. According to mall management, the mob began asking the people present there ‘Are you Hindu or Christian? 'What is your caste?' They vandalized Christmas trees and other decorations while chanting slogans. The incident occurred during the state-wide shutdown called by Sarva Samaj and several Hindu organisations.

=== December 25 ===
- Indore: On Christmas Day, a mob vandalized a Christmas celebration in Indore. Reports stated that a group of men stormed a venue, destroying the Christmas tree and other decorations.

== Reactions ==
=== Domestic ===
Congress MP Shashi Tharoor has expressed 'deep concern over rising fear and anxiety among Christians in India...' He commented, "To my mind, this solidarity is fundamental, and we're going through a time, and sadly, there are attacks on Christians in different places of the country. Even in Kerala, there was an attack on a carol singing group in Palakkad, which is truly shocking."

=== International ===
Foreign Ministry of Bangladesh expressed deep concern over the "mass violence" against religious minorities in India and urged the Indian government to properly investigate the "atrocities" committed against the minorities during Christmas. The condemnation followed the India's Ministry of External Affairs' concern over the situation of minorities in Bangladesh issued days prior.
