= H-pop =

H-pop may refer to:

- Hypnagogic pop, a hypnotic music genre
- Hindutva pop, Hindu nationalist music from India
