= Jai Shri Krishna =

Phrase associated with Krishna, often used as salutation in India

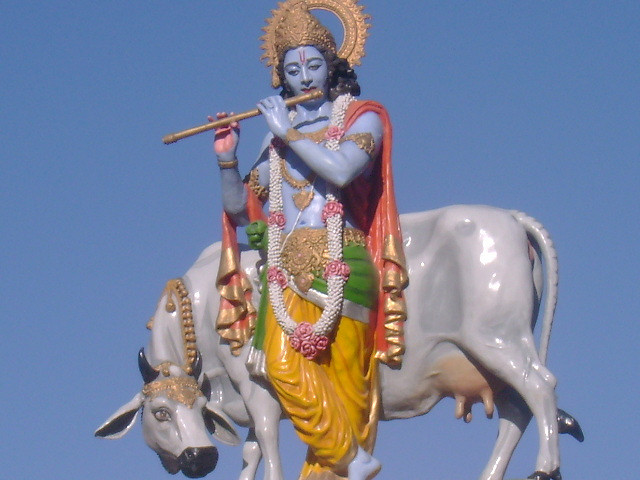
Murti of Hindu deity Krishna

Jai Shri Krishna (Sanskrit: जय श्री कृष्ण, romanized: Jaya Śrī Kṛṣṇa), also rendered Jaya Sri Krishna, is a Sanskrit expression, translating to "Victory to Krishna", a major deity in Hinduism. The salutation is believed to have hailed from the Vaishnavas. The expression is said to greet another person wishing them success, and has also been used as a greeting accompanied with the anjali mudra or bowed head, specially while greeting one's elders.

Jai Shri Krishna expression is widely used expression to greet people during the Hindu festival of Janmashtami, which celebrates the birth of Krishna. In the present day, Jai Shri Krishna is widely used among the Vaishnava community, Gujaratis, and Rajasthanis, based in and out of India.

== Popular culture ==
There is a series with the same name aired on Colors TV between 21 July 2008 to 15 September 2009, which itself is a remake of Sri Krishna, which was aired between 1993 and 1997 in Doordarshan and was re-telecasted in 2020.

There's also a song, "It Is 'He' (Jai Sri Krishna)" by George Harrison that says the mantra.

== See also ==
- Jai Shri Ram – Indic phrase meaning "Hail Lord Rama"
- Jai Siya Ram – Hindu expression in praise of Rama and Sita
- Radhe Radhe – Greeting associated with Goddess Radha, often used in the Braj region of India
