= Radhe Radhe =

Greeting associated with Goddess Radha, often used in the Braj region of India

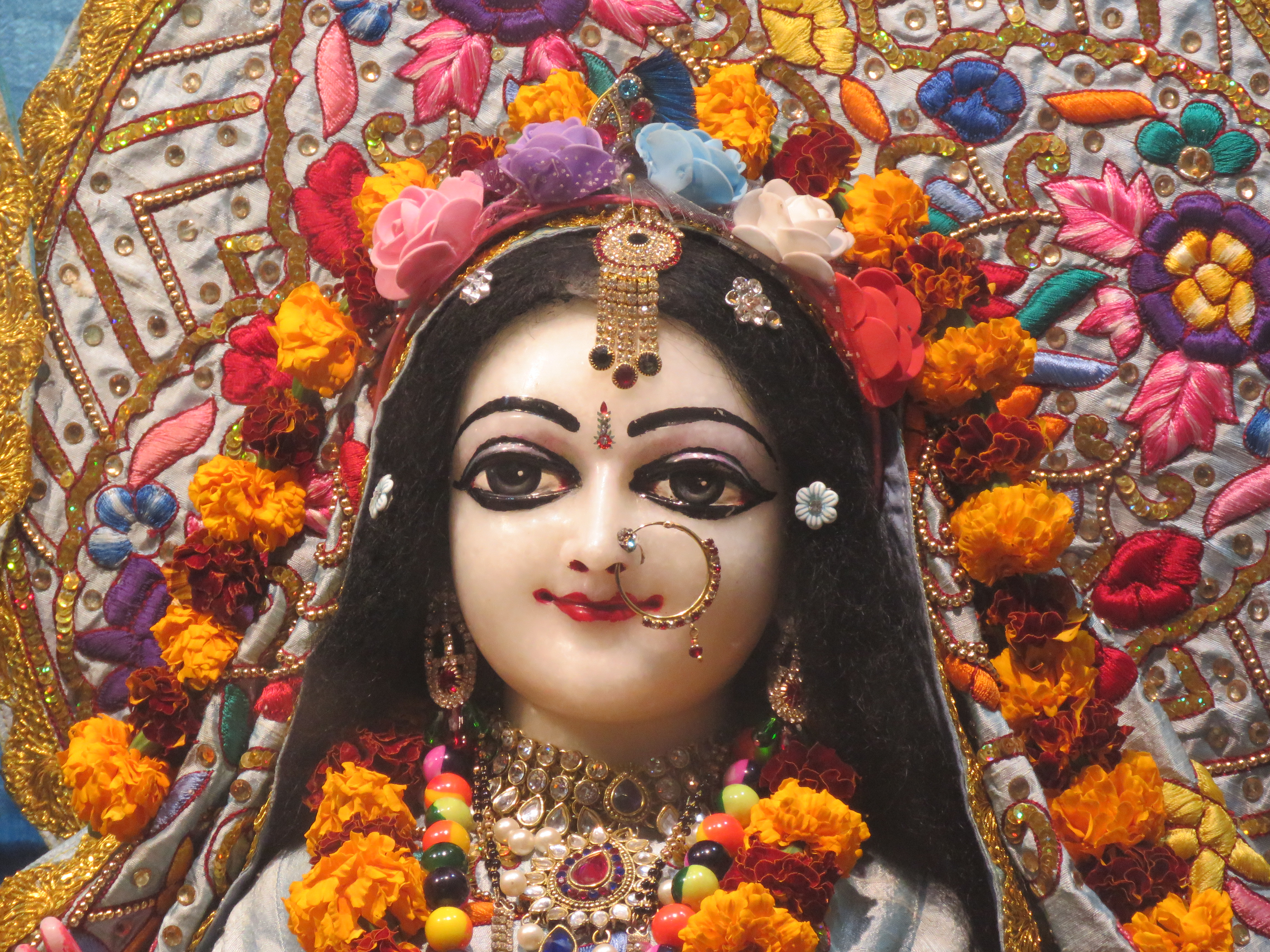
Murti of Radha at ISKCON Varanasi

Radhe Radhe, (Braj: राधे राधे, IAST: Rādhe Rādhe), also spelled Radhey Radhey, is a Braj Bhasha expression used as a greeting and salutation in the Braj region of India. The greeting is associated with the Hindu goddess Radha, who is the consort of Krishna. She is worshiped as the queen of the Braj region, which includes Vrindavan, Barsana, Gokul, Nandgaon, Mathura, Govardhan and Bhandirvan.

== Influence ==
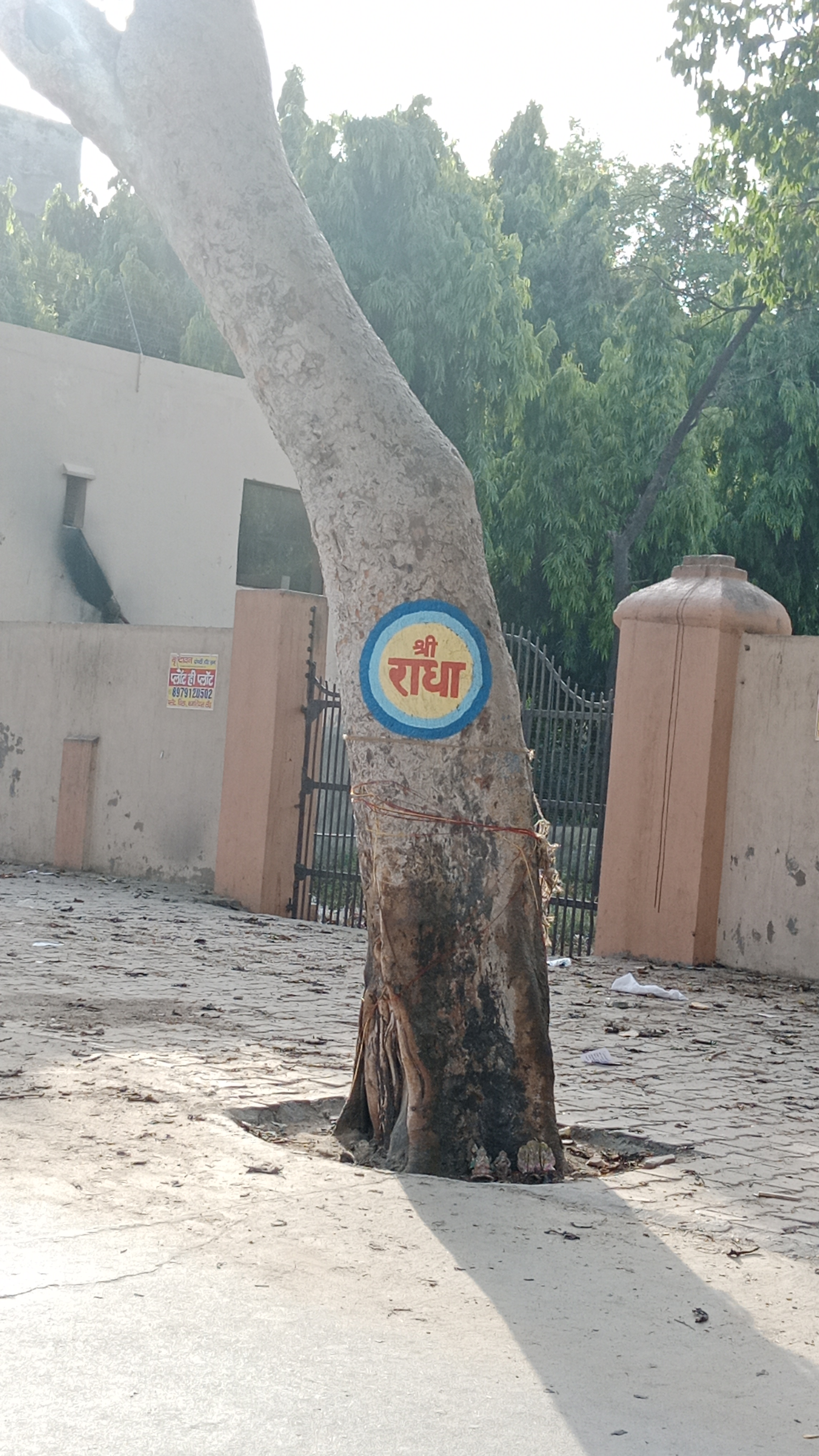
Radha Naam painted on trees of Vrindavan

Along with other common greetings like Jai Shri Krishna, Hare Krishna and Radhe Krishna, Radhe Radhe is also one of the most used greetings among the Vaishnava community. Jai Shri Radhe is a variant of Radhe Radhe often used in temples, which means "Glories to Radha".

It is common to see the phrase Radhe Radhe written on the walls of houses, on the trunks of trees and printed on the clothes of priests and devotees in the Braj region.

== In popular culture ==
"Radhe Radhe" is a song performed by Amit Gupta for the 2019 Bollywood movie Dream Girl.

== See also ==
- Jai Shri Krishna
- Jai Shri Ram
- Jai Siya Ram
- Radha
- Radha Krishna
