= Racist music =

Music expressing discrimination based on race

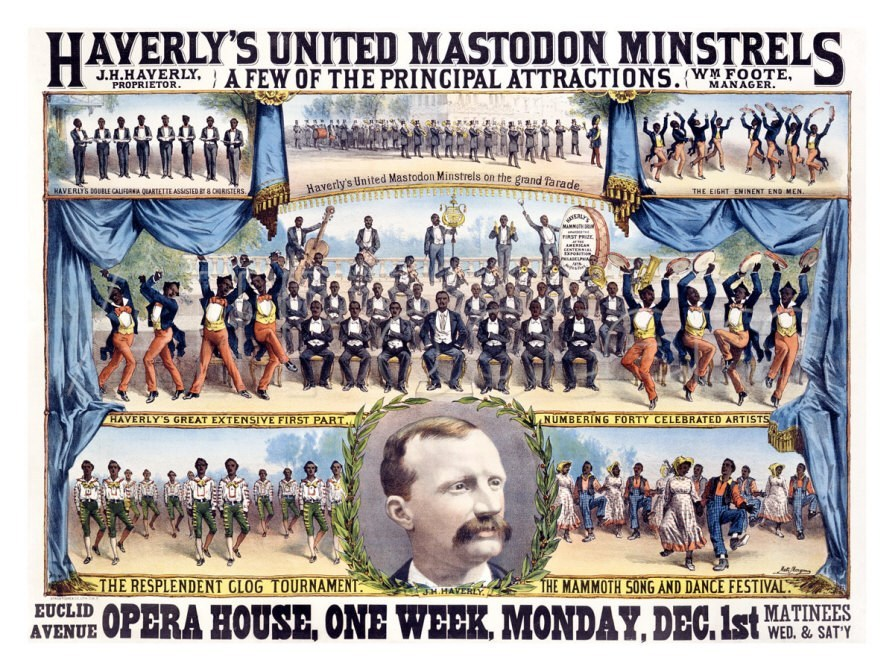
An advertisement for a late 19th century minstrel show featuring racist songs

Racist music is music that expresses racism. Throughout history, music has been used as a propaganda tool to promote a variety of political ideologies and ideas, including racism.

Since the worldwide civil rights movements of the 1960s, the commercial production of racist music has largely ended. Today, the production and distribution of racist music is illegal or it is strictly regulated in many countries and jurisdictions. However, various hate groups continue to compose music expressing racist themes and imagery on a smaller scale.

== Notable examples ==
=== Minstrel shows ===
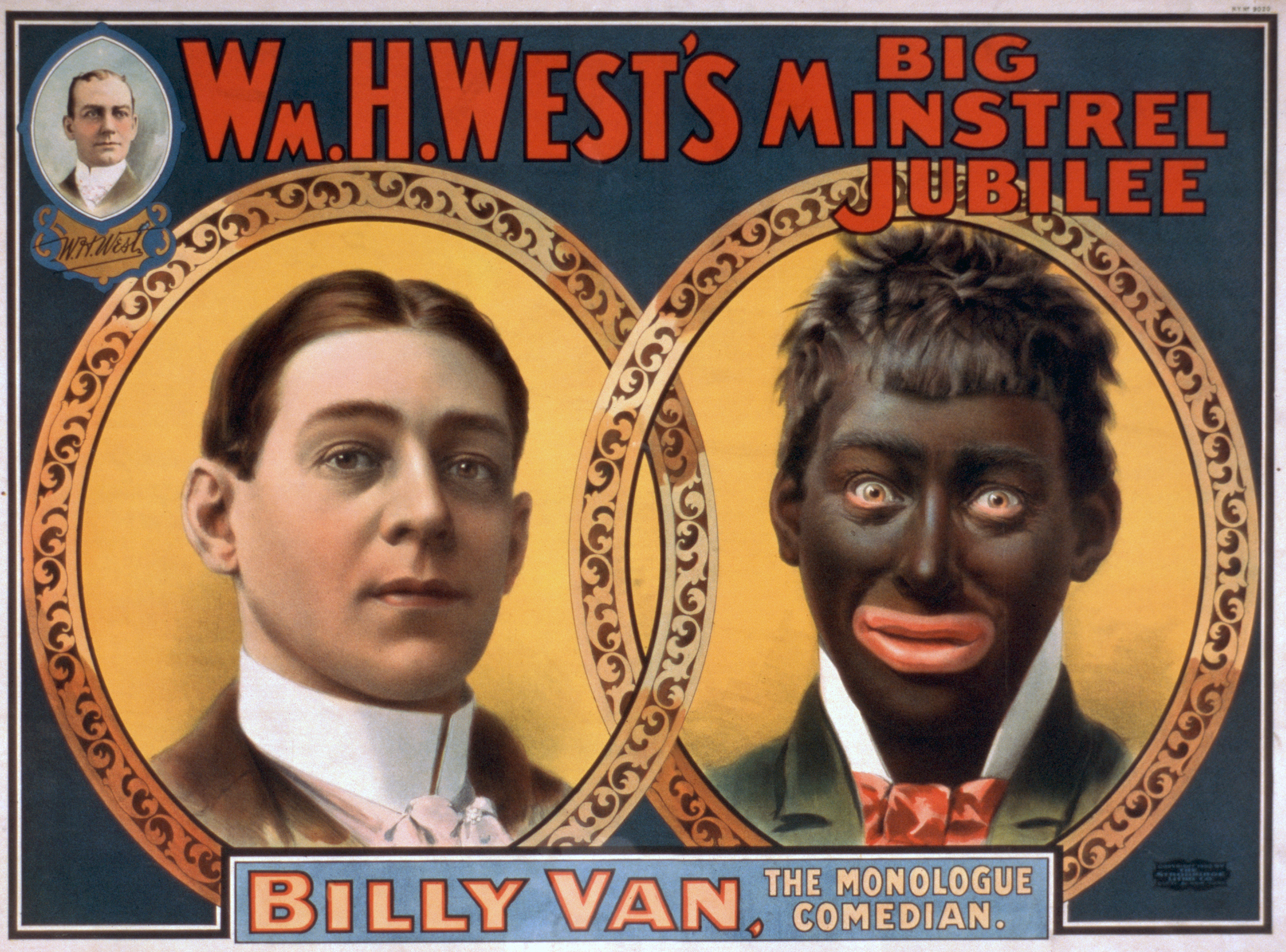
A 1900 minstrel show poster displays an actor's transformation from a light-skinned person of European descent into a caricature of a dark-skinned person of African descent through blackface

The minstrel show (also known as minstrelsy) was a predominantly American form of racist entertainment that persisted from the 1820s until the 1970s. Minstrel shows featured typically white actors performing songs, dances, and comedy skits based on heavily stereotyped and false beliefs surrounding African Americans in blackface, a form of stage makeup designed to mock the appearance of a Black person. During the mid-19th century, minstrel shows formed the center of the American entertainment industry and served as the first uniquely American style of stage performance. Minstrel shows played a significant role in perpetuating anti-Black racism and a heavily romanticized and inaccurate view of the Antebellum South throughout their existence.

=== Coon songs ===
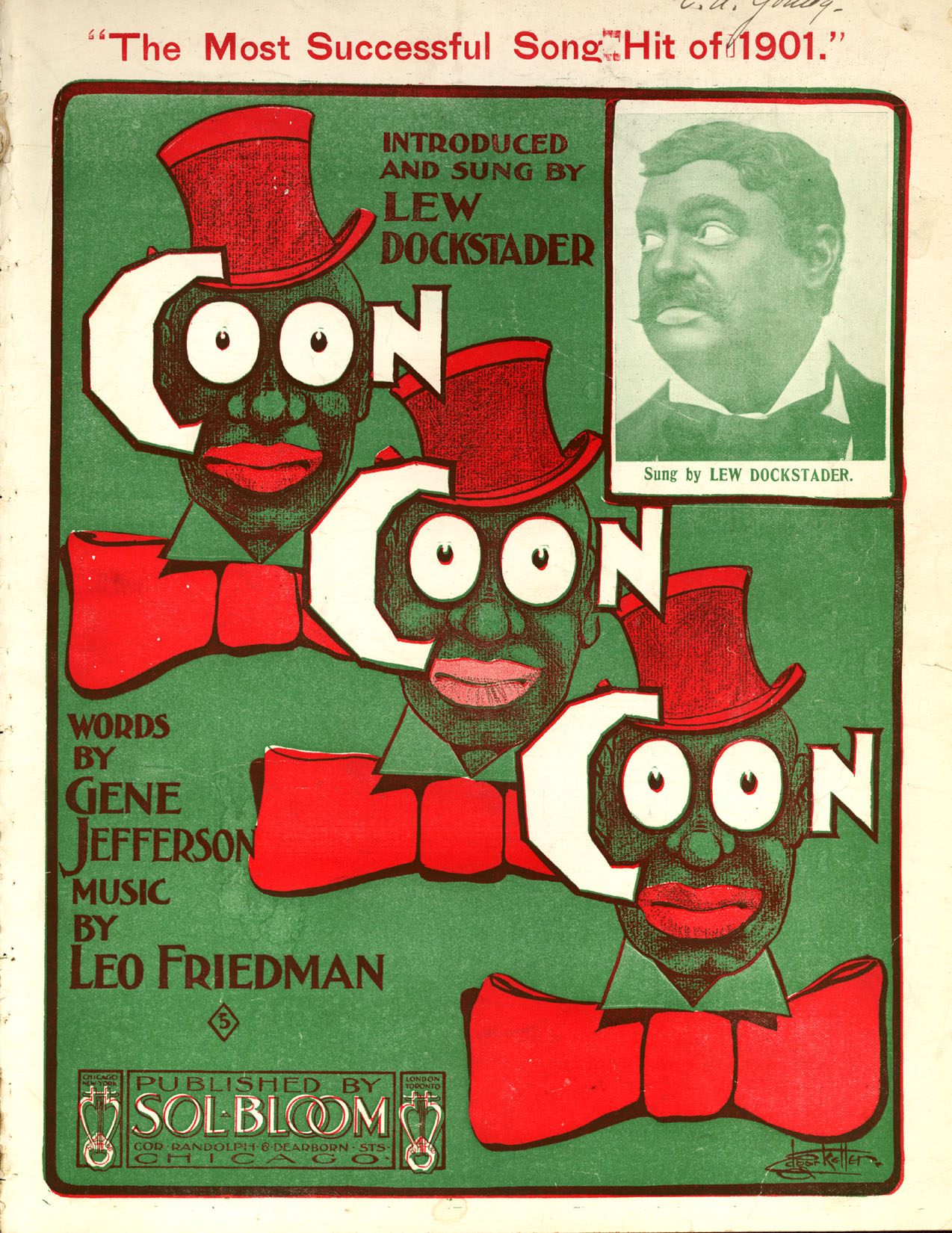
A sheet music cover for a coon song which is titled "Coon, Coon, Coon" with a photograph of minstrel show star Lew Dockstader in blackface

Coon songs were a musical genre of songs based on heavily stereotyped portrayals of Black people. Coon songs resembled and were often synonymous with the music performed at minstrel shows. Because of this, the term coon song is typically used to refer to racist songs commercially released separately from minstrel shows performed in front of a live audience.

=== White power music ===
White power music is music that promotes white nationalism, a political ideology which promotes the establishment of a white ethnostate, a society where white people dominate and rule over all other people. Unlike minstrelsy, coon songs, and earlier forms of racist music, white power music typically refers to music produced during or after the American civil rights movement by various hate groups. According to the Anti-Defamation League, "at any given time, there are usually between 100 and 150 white power music bands operating in the United States."

== Legality ==
In the United States, racist music is protected freedom of speech in the United States by the First Amendment to the U.S. Constitution. However, laws surrounding racist music vary widely by jurisdiction and are typically classified under laws surrounding hate speech.

== See also ==
- "Das Judenthum in der Musik" ("Jewishness in Music"), an antisemitic essay by German composer Richard Wagner
- Far-right subcultures, the symbolism, ideology and traits of extreme right-wing groups
- National Socialist black metal, black metal that promotes Nazism
- Nazi punk, a punk who supports Nazism
- Rock Against Communism, a music genre derived from 1970s UK white power rock concerts
- Hindutva pop, Hindu nationalist music in India, often anti-Muslim
