= 2025 Cuttack violence =

October 2025 disturbances in Cuttack, Odisha, India

- Part of Religious violence in Odisha
- Date: 4–7 October 2025
- Location: Cuttack, Odisha, India
- Caused by: Clash during Durga Puja idol immersion procession
- Methods: Stone-pelting, arson, public disorder
- Status: Curfew lifted on 7 October 2025
- Result: Curfew and internet suspension imposed; 30 arrests

Parties
Local residents, procession participants	Odisha Police

Casualties and losses
25 civilians injured (approx.)	8 police personnel injured

Casualties
- Arrested: At least 30 people

2025 Cuttack violence was a series of incidents of violence and public disorder that took place in Cuttack, Odisha, India, in early October 2025. The clashes began during Durga Puja idol immersion processions in the Dargah Bazar and Haathi Pokhari localities and led to injuries to police and civilians, arson, the imposition of curfew orders, and temporary suspension of internet services across the city.

== Background ==
Cuttack, known as Odisha's former capital and often referred to as the "Millennium City", has long been recognised for its pluralistic culture where communities jointly participate in Durga Puja festivities.

== Timeline ==
=== 4 October 2025: Initial clashes ===
According to multiple reports, violence first broke out between 1:30 a.m. and 2 a.m. on 4 October 2025 near Haathi Pokhari in the Dargah Bazar area during an idol immersion procession organised by the Jhanjirimangala Bhagabat Puja Committee.

Police said that clashes began after some locals allegedly objected to loud music played during the procession. Stones and glass bottles were reportedly thrown from rooftops, injuring at least six persons, including Deputy Commissioner of Police Rishikesh Khilari Dnyandeo.

=== 5 October 2025: Fresh violence and curfew ===
Fresh incidents occurred on Sunday, 5 October, when police attempted to prevent a motorcycle rally held in support of the VHP’s call for a citywide bandh. The confrontation led to stone-pelting and arson near Gourishankar Park, leaving about 25 people injured, including eight police officers.

Authorities imposed prohibitory orders under Section 144 of the Criminal Procedure Code in 13 police station limits and suspended internet services from 7 p.m. on 5 October for 24 hours to prevent the spread of “provocative and inflammatory messages.” A 36-hour curfew began at 10 p.m. the same night, restricting movement in affected areas.

=== 6–7 October 2025: Arrests and restoration of order ===
Police arrested at least eight persons linked to the Sunday violence and six connected with the earlier procession clashes. The curfew was lifted on 7 October after 36 hours of calm, while internet services were gradually restored later that evening.

== Government and political responses ==
Chief Minister Mohan Charan Majhi appealed for peace, describing Cuttack as a “thousand-year-old city known for its brotherhood,” and directed police to take strict action against offenders. Leaders from across political parties expressed concern over the violence. Leader of the Opposition Naveen Patnaik of the Biju Janata Dal condemned the incidents and called for restoration of harmony and accountability.

On 10 October, Odisha Minister Prithviraj Harichandan stated that the state administration had “handled the situation well,” noting that normalcy had returned to Cuttack. He also criticised comments by West Bengal Chief Minister Mamata Banerjee, describing them as “irresponsible” and potentially provocative. Revenue Divisional Commissioner (Central Division) Guha Poonam Tapas Kumar, who reviewed the situation on 7 October with senior police and district officials, said that anyone taking the law into their own hands would face legal action and emphasised the need for communal harmony. Police Commissioner S. Dev Datta Singh reported that curfew measures and security deployments had helped restore order and that no fresh violence had occurred after 5 October.

Beyond Odisha, West Bengal Chief Minister Mamata Banerjee criticised the violence, alleging that the Bharatiya Janata Party (BJP) and affiliated groups such as the Bajrang Dal were attempting to disrupt communal harmony in Odisha. The Odisha government dismissed her remarks as “unbecoming” of a Chief Minister and urged her to focus on law and order in her own state.

== Aftermath ==
As of 10 October 2025, police reported 30 arrests connected to both the 4 October and 5 October incidents. Security forces remained deployed in sensitive localities such as Dargah Bazar and Qadam Rasool, and police warned of legal action against the spread of rumours on social media.

Additional reports in the week following the clashes described a separate incident in Khuntuni, about 26 km from Cuttack, where two Muslim youths were allegedly assaulted and paraded with saffron flags by a group of right-wing activists on 6 October. A video of the incident surfaced online on 13 October, prompting a police inquiry. According to The Telegraph, local police confirmed that an investigation had been initiated after the video went viral, while political leaders and civil society groups expressed concern over rising communal tensions in the state.

In the days following the lifting of the curfew, Commissionerate Police organised peace committee meetings across Cuttack ahead of upcoming festivals such as Kali Puja, Kartikeshwar Puja, and Bali Jatra. According to The New Indian Express, these meetings brought together community leaders, representatives of puja and mosque committees, market associations, and local officials to promote harmony and prevent further disturbances. Deputy Commissioner of Police Rishikesh Khilari stated that the initiative aimed to reinforce mutual respect and ensure peaceful celebrations in the wake of the recent violence.

=== Analysis and commentary ===
According to a report by India Today, the Cuttack violence, along with a night curfew in Balasore and a political killing in Berhampur, led to widespread concern about law and order in Odisha during the festive season. The magazine described how what began as a dispute over loud music during a Durga Puja immersion procession in Cuttack escalated into one of the city’s most serious communal disturbances in decades. It noted that the unrest, coupled with preventive restrictions in other districts, had raised questions about the state government’s capacity to manage inter-community tensions and maintain public confidence.

Writing in The Hindu, academic and columnist Shaikh Mujibur Rehman argued that the violence marked “a setback to Odisha’s secular ethos” and reflected growing social polarisation under the Bharatiya Janata Party government. He compared the 2025 Cuttack clashes to earlier communal disturbances in the State — including Bhadrak (2024) and Kandhamal (2008) — and observed that despite Odisha’s relatively small Muslim population, the city of Cuttack had historically maintained strong traditions of coexistence.

== See also ==
- 2023 Manipur violence
- 2022 Khargone violence
- Religious violence in Odisha
