= Interpellation (politics) =

Formal request of a parliament to the respective government

Interpellation is a formal parliamentary procedure through which members of parliament request that the government explain, clarify, or justify its policies, actions, or decisions. Typically presented in written or oral form, this process mandates that the government respond within a specified timeframe and may lead to subsequent debates or even votes of no confidence. The primary objectives of interpellation are to ensure governmental accountability—upholding the principles of responsible government—as well as to monitor the exercise of executive power and safeguard against its abuse while promoting transparency and public participation in policy deliberations.

Interpellation in parliamentary politics can be traced back to Latin and French. The term comes from the Latin verb interpellāre, meaning “to interrupt by speaking” or “to call out.” The word was subsequently absorbed into medieval French as “interpellation,” retaining the meaning of “to call out” or “to interrupt.” Over time, the term came to be used to describe the formal mechanism by which legislators in parliament question or challenge government ministers on their policies or actions. In English, the concept of “interpellation” in this political sense emerged in the early to mid-19th century, influenced by French constitutional practice, and became established in parliamentary politics as a tool for ensuring government accountability and transparency.

== Historical and theoretical sources ==
=== Emergence of parliamentary oversight tradition in the Middle Ages ===
==== Magna Carta and early forms of parliament ====
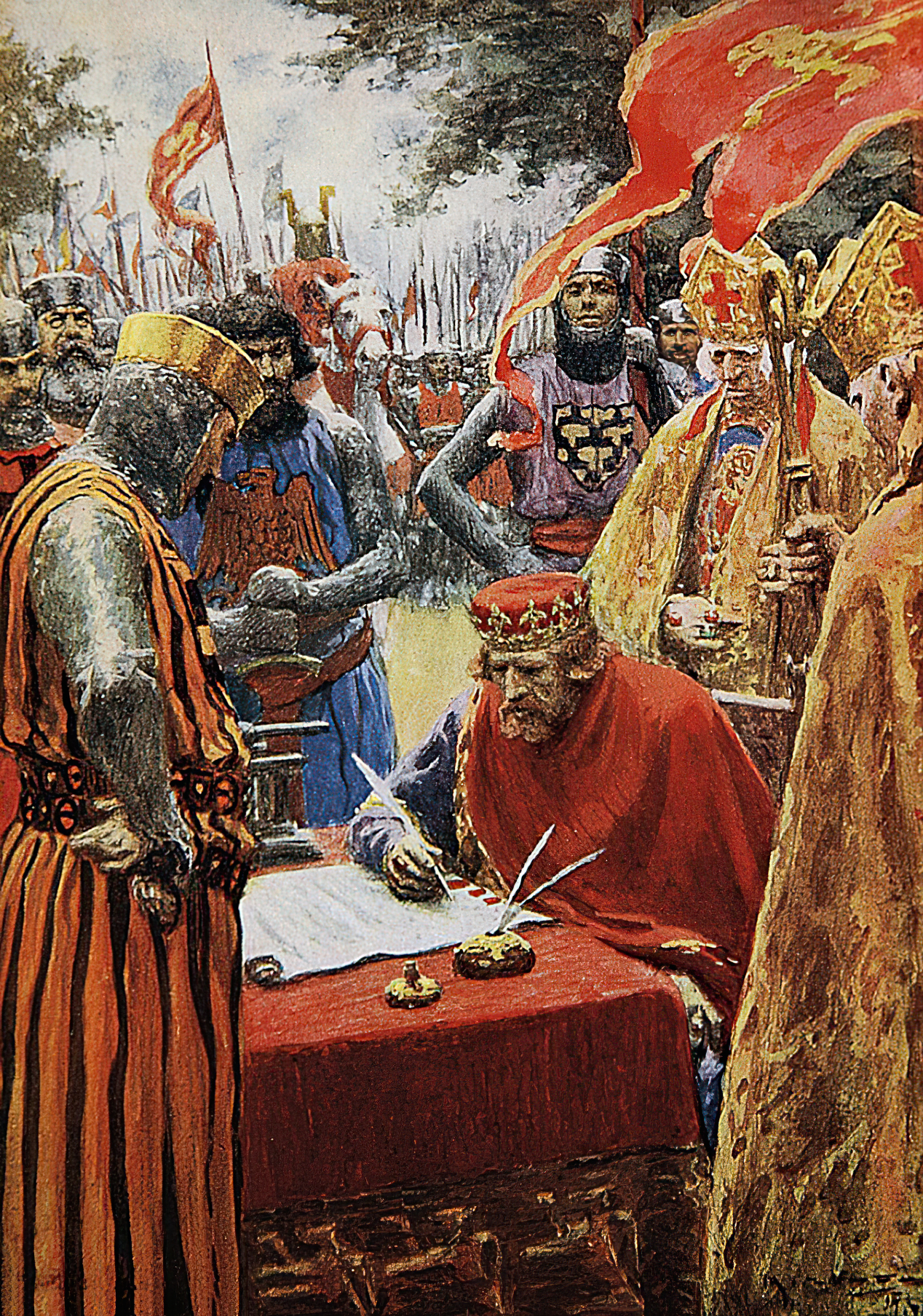

The Magna Carta of 1215 restricted the power of the king for the first time in the form of a law, which stipulated that the king's taxation should be subject to the consent of the Common Council (i.e. the Council of Nobles) and established the Committee of Oversight, which was composed of 25 nobles, and this became an early prototype of the parliamentary oversight power. In 1265, the ‘Westgate Parliament’ further included representatives of knights and citizens, marking the transition from a hierarchical to a representative parliament and providing an organizational basis for the interpellation system.

At this time, although the parliament has not formed a systematic interpellation procedures, but has established the ‘king's power subject to parliamentary constraints’ principle, for the follow-up monitoring mechanism to lay the legal basis.

==== France Estates-General and hierarchical consultation ====
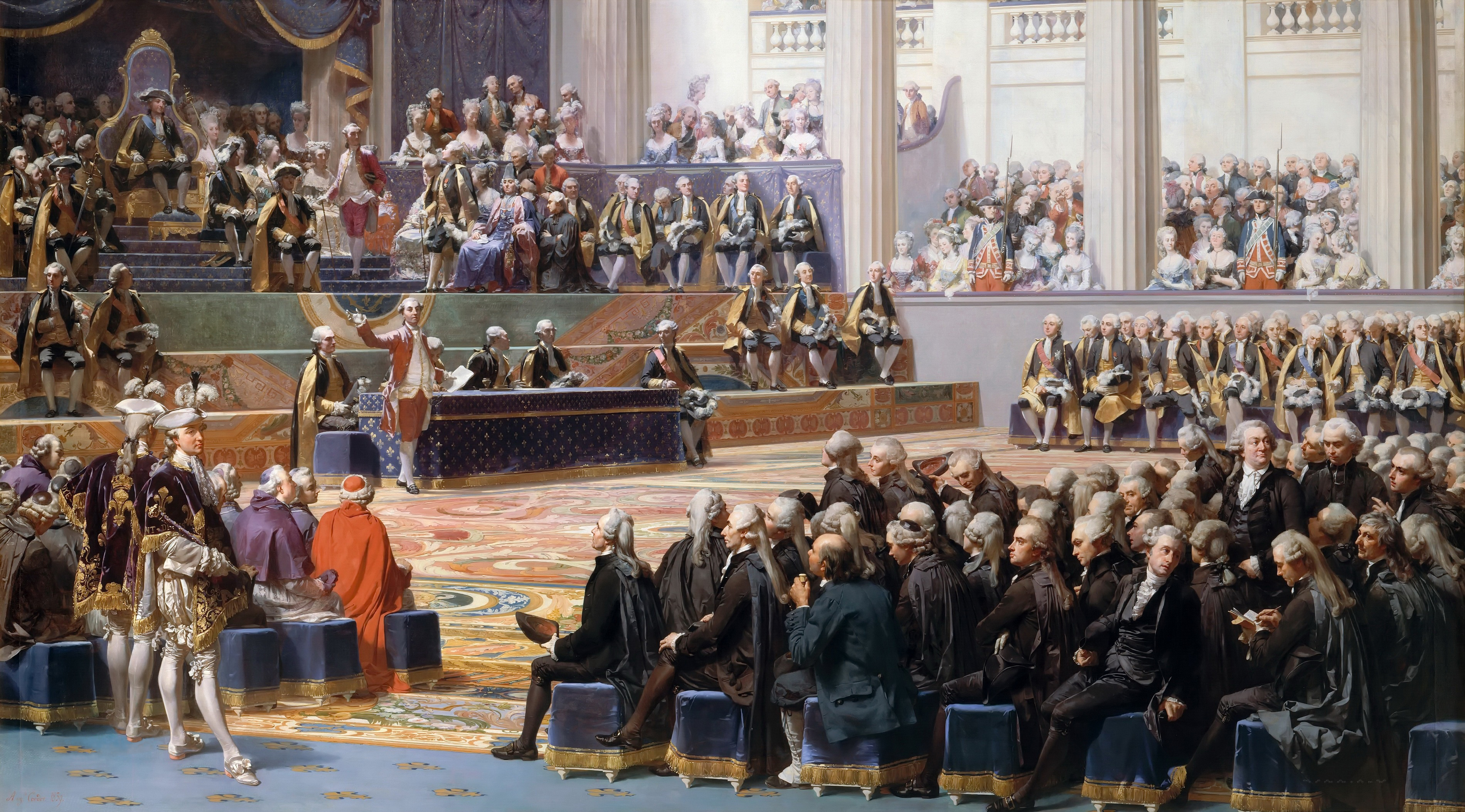
Estates-General

Although Estates-General in France in the Middle Ages (composed of clergy, nobles and citizens) were not established institutions, they expressed the interpellation of the king's power through collective debates and petitions, which indirectly influenced the consultation tradition of the interpellation system.

=== Establishment of the modern parliamentary system and legalization of the right of question ===
==== Glorious Revolution and parliamentary supremacy ====
After the Glorious Revolution of 1688, the Bill of Rights (1689) established the sovereignty of Parliament, which began to directly supervise the government through debates and impeachment, etc. The formation of the Prime Ministerial system in the 18th century (e.g. Robert Walpole's leadership of the Cabinet) led to the development of the ‘Prime Ministerial Question Time’, in which Members of Parliament could orally question the government's policies, which became the starting point of the practice of the modern system of interpellation. 19th century British parliamentary reforms (e.g. the Reform Act of 1832) enlarged the right of suffrage and strengthened the role of the Parliament as a body of public opinion, and the questions gradually evolved from an informal debate to a procedural tool of supervision.

==== French Revolution ====
During the French Revolution, the National Assembly (1792–1795) adopted the ‘droit d'interpellation’ (right of interpellation), which allowed parliamentarians to question the government either in writing or orally and to demand a response from the government.

The French Revolution of 1789 marked a pivotal moment in the evolution of parliamentary questioning in France. Prior to the revolution, institutions known as "parlements"—most notably the Parlement of Paris—functioned as judicial bodies that registered and, at times, challenged royal edicts, but they were not representative assemblies tasked with systematic political oversight. The convocation of the Estates-General in 1789, after a long hiatus, and the subsequent transformation of the Third Estate into the National Assembly catalyzed an unprecedented demand for transparency and accountability. Although these early practices did not yet embody the formalized system of parliamentary questions seen in later periods, revolutionary deputies engaged in impassioned debates and confrontations with ministers and royal officials, setting a precedent that government actions must be subject to public scrutiny. Additionally, the compilation of cahiers de doléances, or lists of grievances and demands from across French society, underscored the collective insistence on ministerial accountability and laid the ideological groundwork for the more structured interrogative mechanisms that would emerge in French political life. This system was later enshrined in the Constitution of the Third Republic (1875) and became the template for the system of interpellation in continental Europe.

=== 19th-20th centuries: global proliferation of the interpellation system and divergence of models ===
==== Nordic model ====
Parliamentary questioning in the Nordic countries evolved gradually alongside the transition from medieval public forums to modern representative democracies. Early legislative institutions, such as Iceland's Althing and the Faroese Løgting—among the oldest parliamentary bodies in the world—provided venues for open public debate and communal resolution of conflicts, laying a rudimentary foundation for the accountability of leadership. During the 19th and early 20th centuries, as constitutional reforms took hold in Denmark, Finland, Iceland, Norway, and Sweden, these ancient practices were transformed into formally institutionalized mechanisms for ministerial accountability. The modern system of parliamentary questioning—comprising both oral and written inquiries—emerged as an essential tool for scrutinizing executive action, reflecting the region's broader tradition of consensus, technical scrutiny through standing committees, and pragmatic cross-party negotiation.

==== Westminster system ====
Parliamentary questioning in the Westminster system evolved significantly across Commonwealth countries during the 19th and 20th centuries, adapting to shifts in governance, political culture, and media influence. In the 19th century, questioning was often an informal yet powerful tool for ministerial accountability, with countries such as Australia and Canada adopting the British model, where opposition members used debates to challenge government policies and expose inconsistencies. These exchanges were lengthy and characterized by rhetorical skill, as backbenchers scrutinized executive decisions during an era of expanding democratic participation. By the 20th century, parliamentary questioning became more structured and institutionalized, with formalized question periods such as Australia's Question Time and Canada's Oral Questions providing a predictable framework for ministerial scrutiny. The rise of mass media further transformed questioning dynamics, as televised broadcasts placed ministers under public scrutiny, necessitating concise and persuasive responses. In India, which adopted the Westminster system after independence, parliamentary questioning became a crucial mechanism for democratic oversight, allowing opposition leaders to challenge government policies and highlight administrative shortcomings

==== Germany ====
The parliamentary question system in Germany has evolved significantly from its early conceptualization in the 19th century to its present role as an essential mechanism of democratic oversight. Early liberal movements and the revolutionary momentum of 1848, prominently embodied by the Frankfurt Assembly, introduced the idea of holding government ministers accountable through formal questioning. Although these early experiments were short-lived, they laid the conceptual groundwork for challenging executive authority. During the subsequent German Empire, the Reichstag implemented parliamentary question procedures; however, the executive—under the Kaiser and appointed Chancellor—remained largely insulated from genuine scrutiny, rendering these questions largely symbolic. The advent of the Weimar Republic following World War I marked a substantive transformation, as both oral and written parliamentary questions became integral to legislative oversight, reflecting a stronger commitment to transparency despite a turbulent political climate. The legacy of these historical developments is evident in the modern Bundestag, where parliamentary questions continue to serve as a vital tool in ensuring that the executive remains accountable to the electorate.

== Specific procedures and forms ==
=== 1. Submission of the question ===
- The subject: Usually submitted by a member of parliament (individually or jointly), some countries require a minimum number of joint signatures (e.g. 5% of members of parliament in Germany).
- Written submission: The content of the question must be submitted in writing, clearly defining the scope and basis of the question.
- Time limit: Parliament may set a deadline for the submission of questions (e.g. 48 hours in advance) to ensure that the government is prepared to respond.

=== 2. Acceptance and arrangement of the interpellation ===
- Speaker's review: The speaker reviews the question to ensure that it complies with procedural rules. Repetitive, trivial or extraneous questions may be rejected.
- Schedule arrangement: The question is placed on the parliamentary agenda, and the government official must be present to answer it (some countries allow written replies).

=== 3. Question and answer ===
- Oral question
  - The MP asks a question on the spot, and the official gives an immediate reply.
  - Supplementary questions may be allowed (e.g. ‘Supplementary Questions’ in the UK).
  - Time is limited (e.g. 3–5 minutes per person).
- Written Interpellation
  - The government responds in writing within a certain period of time (e.g. 7 days), and the content is made public.
- Urgent Interpellation
  - In the event of a sudden public incident, a fast-track process can be applied for, bypassing the regular schedule.

=== 4. Follow-up actions ===
- Debate and Vote
  - If a member of parliament is dissatisfied with the response, they can initiate a debate and vote (e.g. pass a ‘censure motion’ or ‘no confidence motion’).
  - In some countries (e.g. France), a parliamentary question can directly trigger a vote of no confidence.
- Public record
  - The content of the question and the answer are recorded in the parliamentary gazette and made public.

== Typical cases and their implications ==
=== Finland: direct linkage between interpellations and a vote of no confidence ===
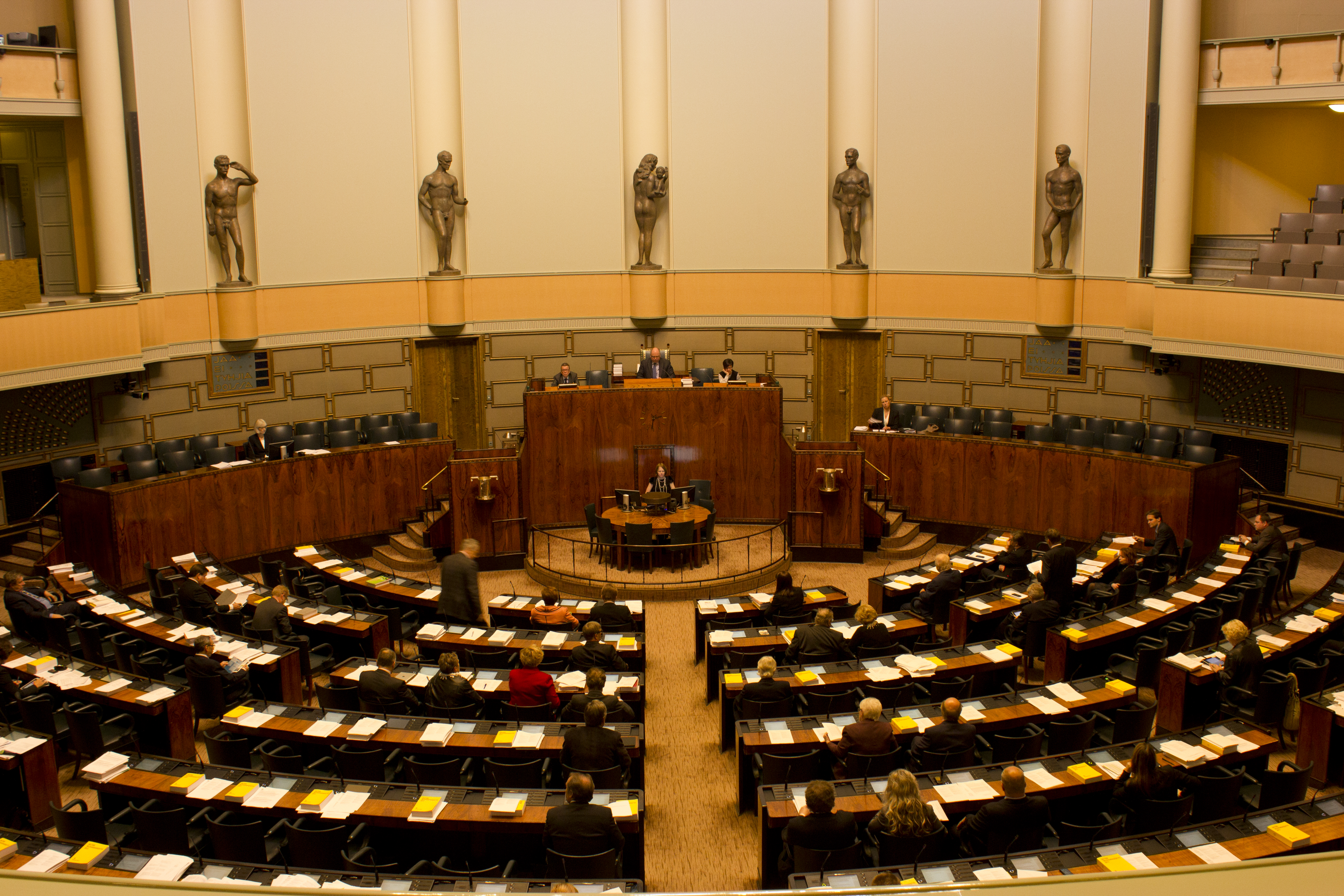
Finnish Parliament

- Procedural features: following a parliamentary question, the government is required to respond and be debated by the full parliament within 15 days, after which a vote of confidence is automatically triggered. If the parliamentary vote is not passed, the government or the relevant minister must resign.
- Example: Finland's constitution provides for parliamentary interpellation of a single minister or the entire cabinet, highlighting its function as a ‘soft no-confidence motion.

=== Germany: Interrogation and Oversight in a Mixed System ===
- Legal framework: Germany's Basic Law provides that Parliament may summon the Chancellor or ministers to the plenary for interpellation. The procedure is set out in the Rules of Parliament and usually requires a group of MPs to initiate the interpellation.
- Practical features: Interpellations often focus on major issues (e.g. foreign policy or the budget), and the debate may be followed by a resolution expressing a position but does not directly trigger a motion of no confidence. A separate motion of no confidence is required.

=== UK and Westminster: Combination of Question Time and Regular Oversight ===
- Question Time: MPs can regularly ask questions of the Prime Minister or ministers, but this is an informal process with a focus on immediate responses.
- Formal Questioning (Interpellation): requires the submission of a written motion, which is approved by Parliament and initiates a debate, but is less often directly linked to a vote of no confidence. For example, in the UK, a motion of no confidence is presented independently of the interpellation process.

=== France: special design for the interaction between the executive and the legislature ===
- Constitutional guarantees: Members of Parliament may demand a response from the government through written or oral questions, to which the government must reply within one month. In case of major disputes, Parliament may initiate commissions of inquiry or impeachment proceedings.
- Political implications: Although the interpellation itself does not trigger a vote of no confidence, frequent interpellation may undermine the government's credibility and indirectly contribute to cabinet reshuffles.

=== Japan ===
- Representative Inquiry (代表質問): During the parliamentary session, representatives of all parties can question the Prime Minister about policy.
- Budget Committee Inquiry: Focusing on fiscal policy, it often becomes a battleground for the ruling and opposition parties.

== See also ==
- Question time
- Question Hour
- Motion of no confidence
- Prime Minister's Questions
