= Jai Shri Ram =

Indic phrase meaning "Hail Lord Rama"

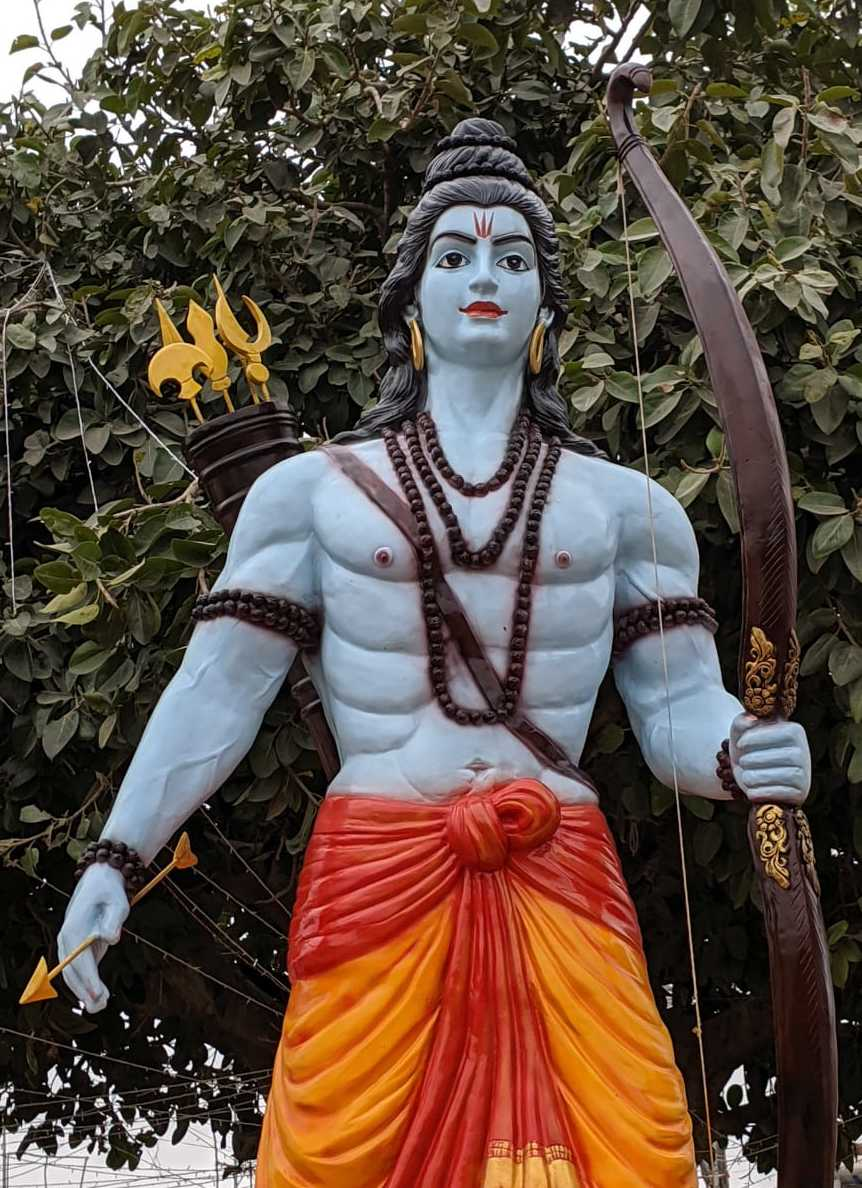
A statue of Rama in Ayodhya

Jai Shri Ram (Note: Also known as Jai Sri Ram, Jai Shree Ram, or Jai Shri Rama.) (IAST: Jaya Śrī Rāma) is an expression in Indic languages, translating to "Glory to Lord Rama" or "Victory to Lord Rama". The proclamation has been used by Hindus as a greeting, as a devotional expression, or as a symbol of adhering to the Hindu faith.

The expression has been increasingly used by Indian organisations aligning with Hindutva, a Hindu nationalist ideology, such as the Vishva Hindu Parishad (VHP), Bharatiya Janata Party (BJP) and their allies, which adopted the slogan in the late 20th century as a tool for increasing the visibility of Hinduism in public spaces, before going on to use it as a battle cry. The slogan has since been employed in connection with the perpetration of communal violence against Muslims.

== Meaning ==
"Jai Shri Ram" means "Hail Lord Ram" or "Victory to Lord Ram". Ram (or Rama) is a major deity in Hinduism.

== Antecedents ==
=== Religious and social ===
"Jaya Sri Ram", along with "Jaya Sita Ram", "Jaya Ram" and "Sita Ram", were used as mutual salutations by Ramanandi ascetics (called Bairagis). "Ram Ram", "Jai Ram ji ki" and "Jai Siya Ram" have been noted as common salutations in the Hindi heartland (Sita or Siya is the name of Rama's consort). The Ahmadnagar Kaikadis used to tattoo "Sri Ram", "Jai-Ram", and "Jai-Jai-Ram", on their hands and feet.

Photojournalist Prashant Panjiar wrote about how in the city Ayodhya female pilgrims always chant "Sita-Ram-Sita-Ram", while the older male pilgrims prefer not to use Rama's name at all. As per Panjiar, the traditional usage of "Jai" in a slogan was with "Siyavar Ramchandraji ki jai" ("Victory to Sita's husband Rama").

Sukhdevlal's 1884 commentary of Tulsikrit Ramayana does, however, mention the slogan "Jai Ram Jai Shri Ram" being used. Also, the phrase "Sri Ram Jai Ram Jai Jai Ram" was chanted in mantras and used in kirtan (religious stories), while "Jai Shri Ram" has been used in the bhajan (devotional song) "Jai Shri Ram nabh Ghansham".

=== Rama symbolism ===
The worship of Rama increased significantly in the 12th century, following the invasions of Muslim Turks. The Ramayana became widely popular in the 16th century. It is argued that the story of Rama offers a "very powerful imaginative formulation of the divine king as the only being capable of combating evil". The concept of Ramrajya, "the rule of Ram", was used by Gandhi to describe the ideal country free from the British.

The most widely known political use of Ram began with Baba Ram Chandra's peasant movement in Awadh in the 1920s. He encouraged the use of "Sita-Ram" as opposed to the then widely used "Salaam" as a greeting, since the latter implied social inferiority. "Sita-Ram" soon became a rallying cry.

Journalist Mrinal Pande states that slogans were often chanted for the duo of Sita and Rama, such as Bol Siyavar or Siyapat Ramchandra ki jai [victory to Ram, Sita's husband], although growing up she never heard any about Ram as an individual, let alone a warrior. But in Methodist Quarterly Review, Volume LXII.–1880., Rev. B. H. Badley has mentioned Indian soldiers cheering "Ram Rajah Ki Jai !" and "Ram Chandra Ki Jai !" ("Hurrah for King Ram Chandra— Victory to Ram !") while leaving the Bombay harbor for Malta. And J. F. Fanthome, in his book Mariam: A Story of the Indian Mutiny of 1857 (1896), mentions Hindus using the war cry of "Jai Sri Ram Lachmanji ki" ("Victory to Lord Rama and Lakshmana") against the British during the Indian Rebellion of 1857, while Muhammadans yelled "Ek nara Haidari, ya Husein".

=== Numismatics ===
Gharib Niwaz, ruler of the Manipur Kingdom, issued bell metal coins with the phrase "Jai Shri Ram", "Shri Ram" and "Jai Shri" in 18th century.

== 1980s and forward ==
In the late 1980s, the slogan "Jai Shri Ram" was popularised by Ramanand Sagar's television series Ramayan, where it was used by Hanuman and the Vanara Sena (monkey army) as a war cry when they fought the imperial army of Ravana in order to free Sita. Sagar himself acknowledged his contribution, claiming, "College boys don't say 'Hi' any more, they say 'Jai Shri Ram ki' 'Long live Shri Ram'."

The Hindu nationalist organisation Vishva Hindu Parishad (VHP) and its militant wing Bajrang Dal, carried out a campaign saying "Ram-Ram Chhodo, Jai Shri Ram Bolo" ("Stop saying Ram-Ram, Say Jai Shri Ram"). During L. K. Advani's ratha yatra to Ayodhya in 1989, the customary slogan Jai Siya Ram was replaced by "Jai Shri Ram". The VHP, Bharatiya Janata Party and their Sangh Parivar allies used it extensively in their Ayodhya Ram Janmabhoomi movement. Volunteers at Ayodhya at the time would write the slogan on their skin, using their own blood as ink to signify their devotion. The organizations also distributed a cassette named as Jai Shri Ram, containing songs like "Ram ji ki sena chali" (transl. the army of Rama is on the move) and "Aya samay jawano jago" (transl. the time has come for the martial youth to arise). All the songs in the cassette were set to the tunes of popular Bollywood songs. Kar sevaks, led by the Sangh Parivar allies, chanted the slogan of "Jai Shri Ram" when laying a foundation east of the Babri Masjid in August 1992.

Simultaneously the Rama pictography was changed to projecting a heroic, muscular, and angry Rama. A muscular Rama, clad in saffron, was shown towering over an imaginary Ram temple in Ayodhya. These images were labelled with the "Jai Shri Ram" slogan (written in the Devanagari script of Hindi).

A 1995 essay published in Manushi, a journal edited by academic Madhu Kishwar, described how the Sangh Parivar's usage of "Jai Shri Ram", as opposed to "Sita-Ram", lies in the fact that their violent ideas had "no use for a non-macho Ram." This also mobilised more people politically, since it was patriarchal. Further, the movement was exclusively associated with Ram's birth, which had occurred many years before his marriage to Sita.

Sociologist Jan Breman writes:

It is a "Blut und Boden" (blood and soil) movement which aims to purify Bharat (the Motherland) from foreign elements.... The damage that the nation sustained is, to a significant extent, the consequence of the gentleness and indulgence that the people showed in the face of the repressive foreigners. The softness and femininity that came to be dominant in Hinduism, a change that was wrought by the cunning machinations of the enemy, now must make place for the original, masculine, powerful Hindu ethos. This explains the warlike, extremely aggressive character of the appeal for a national revival launched by the advocates of Hindutva. An interesting aside here is that the greeting "Jai Siya Ram" has been transformed into the battle cry "Jai Shri Ram" ("Long live Lord Ram"). The Hindu supreme god has assumed the form of a macho general. In the original meaning, "Siya Ram" had been a popular greeting of welcome in the countryside since time immemorial... The Hindu fanatics have now also banished her from the popular greeting by changing Siya to "Shri" (Lord), thereby suppressing the feminine element in favour of masculine virility and assertiveness.

— Jan Breman, "Ghettoization and Communal Politics: The Dynamics of Inclusion and Exclusion in the Hindutva Landscape", Institutions and Inequalities: Essays in Honour of Andre Beteille

An Indian political analyst decried the political use of the slogan in 2019, and said that "it now seems to have official sanction." In December 2022, Congress leader Rahul Gandhi while giving a speech in Madhya Pradesh attacked BJP and RSS by raising the question "Why they always chants "Jai Shri Ram" and not "Jai Siya Ram". Reacting to his question, a minister in Madhya Pradesh and a senior BJP leader Narottam Mishra replied "I think Rahul Gandhi's knowledge is only limited to children's rhyme 'Baa Baa Black Sheep', the name of Ram is prefixed with 'Shri' which is also used for Lord Vishnu's wife Lakshmi and Sita Ji". The BJP's Amit Malviya also reacted to Rahul Gandhi's attack by posting a video in which Prime Minister Narendra Modi started his Ram Mandir ceremony speech with "Jai Siya Ram".

The Wire said in 2023 that "We are yet to see any condemnation of the 'misuse' of the sacred name Ram by any religious leader or body."

== Usage ==
=== Everyday use ===
"Jai Shri Ram", "Jai Ram", and "Sita Ram" have been used as salutations by the Ramanandi Sampradaya, along with "Shri Ram" as part of initiation. Such use originates with its founder Ramananda in the fourteenth century, and as such it substantially predates the Hindutva political movement, and it continues to be used by Ramanandi organizations today. According to scholar Rustam Bharucha, "Jai Shri Ram" is a common salutation in north-India, along with "Ram Ram" and "Siya Ram", which he noted as a "thoroughly non-sectarian" practice, "one of the most spontaneous exchanges in daily life", and a "manifestation of civility".

Journalists have found Jai Shri Ram being declared after reciting the Hanuman Chalisa, a practice rooted within the devotional practice of Ramanama, as well as during religious processions. Additionally, it is commonly chanted within congregational religious activities such as bhajans, kirtans, and namajapa, within religious processions, stotra recitations, and aarti, as part of devotion to the Hindu god Rama.

=== Violent incidents ===
- In 1992, during riots and the demolition of the Babri Masjid, the same slogan was raised. Former BBC Bureau Chief Mark Tully, who was present at the site of the Masjid on 6 December, recalls the usage of the slogan "Jai Shri Rama!" by the Hindu crowds rushing towards the mosque.
- In January 1999, the slogan was heard again when Australian missionary doctor Graham Staines was burned alive with his two children in Manoharpur, Orissa.
- In the events leading up to the Godhra train burning of February 2002, supporters of the Gujarat VHP and its affiliated organisations like the Bajrang Dal forced Muslims to chant "Jai Shri Ram" on their journey to Ayodhya, and on their return journey, they did the same at "every other station", including at Godhra. Both journeys were taken in the Sabarmati Express for the ceremony at the Ram Janmabhoomi. During the 2002 Gujarat riots that followed, the slogan was used in a leaflet distributed by the VHP to encourage Hindus to boycott Muslim businesses.
- "Jai Shri Ram" was also chanted by the mob responsible for the Gulbarg Society Massacre. Ehsan Jafri, a former Member of Parliament from Ahmedabad, was forced to chant the slogan before he was brutally murdered during said massacre.
- The slogan was also heard from the mob during the Naroda Patiya massacre. People living in mixed-religion neighborhoods were forced to put up Jai Shri Ram posters and wear armbands to ward off the rioters.
- Tabrez Ansari was forced by a mob to chant "Jai Shree Ram" and "Jai Hanuman" during his lynching.
- All India Democratic Women's Association, the women's wing of CPI(M), alleged that the perpetrators of the 2020 Gargi College molestations were chanting the slogan.
- During the 2020 Delhi riots, rioters were reported to have kept chanting "Jai Shri Ram" while beating their victims and whenever a building went up in flames. The police were also found to join in the chant while siding with the Hindu mobs. The Muslims were told Hindustan me rehna hoga, Jai Shri Ram kehna hoga (transl. "If you want to stay in India, you will have to chant Jai Shri Ram"). Indian journalist Rana Ayyub, writing in Time, commented that the slogan had become a "racist dog whistle" against Muslims during the riots.
- After the BJP's victory in the 2022 Uttar Pradesh Legislative Assembly election, a 25 year old Muslim man, Babar Ali from UP's Kushinagar district was lynched and killed by the members of his own community for supporting BJP. His family members said that Babar was returning from his shop when he chanted 'Jai Shri Ram' and was attacked by some local Muslims.
- On 15 April 2023, while Atiq Ahmed was being escorted for a court-mandated medical checkup in Prayagraj, a pistol was fired at Ahmed and his brother's head. Both Atiq and his brother Ashraf Ahmed were killed in the shootout, which was filmed and broadcast live. After shooting attackers started chanting 'Jai Shri Ram' as they were being apprehended.
- On June 24, 2023, in Pulwama, South Kashmir, Indian Army personnel stormed a mosque and allegedly forced worshippers to chant Jai Shri Ram and bharat mata ke jai. Similarly, on November 24, 2024, Kashmiri shawl sellers in Himachal Pradesh reported being harassed and forced to chant Hindutva slogans, including Jai Shri Ram.
- In October 2024, a 16-year-old Dalit boy in Uttar Pradesh was assaulted and forced to chant Jai Shri Ram by a group of students. Similarly, on December 2024, In Ratlam, Madhya Pradesh, three Muslim minors were allegedly beaten and forced to chant “Jai Shri Ram” by two men near Amrit Sagar Lake.
- On January 16, 2026, a Christian pastor in Odisha was attacked by a mob, including local villagers and members of the Hindutva militant group Bajrang Dal, who tried to force him to chant Jai Shri Ram.

Several other reports of alleged violent incidents associated with the slogan were later found to be false. In June 2019, a group of 49 artists, academics and intellectuals wrote a letter to Prime Minister Narendra Modi, requesting him to put a stop "to the name of Ram being defiled" as a war cry. They demanded that strict action be taken against using the slogan for violent purposes.

=== Politics ===
The BJP advocates using Jai Shri Ram and Jai Siya Ram as a greeting.

In June 2019, the slogan was used to heckle Muslim MPs as they proceeded to take their oath in the 17th Lok Sabha. In July that year, Nobel laureate Amartya Sen stated in a speech that the slogan was "not associated with the Bengali culture", leading to some unknown groups publishing his statement on billboards in Kolkata. The slogan has also been used to heckle West Bengal Chief Minister Mamata Banerjee on multiple occasions, triggering angry reactions from her.

The slogan was used by lawyers to celebrate the 2019 Supreme Court decision to allow a Ram temple to be built on the disputed Ayodhya site where a mob had demolished the Babri Masjid mosque in 1992. In August 2020, following the ground-breaking ceremony of the Ram Temple, Ayodhya, the slogan was used as a chant in celebrations in New York.

The slogan has been used by Bangladeshi Hindus protesting religious persecution. In 2024, protests against attacks saw chants of "Jai Shri Ram" along with "Hare Krishna" and other religious slogans. Additionally, Bangladeshi Hindus seeking political asylum in India have chanted "Jai Shri Ram" at the border. Additionally, in 2025, solidarity protests in India over the lynching of Dipu Chandra Das saw chants of "Jai Shri Ram".

=== Popular culture ===
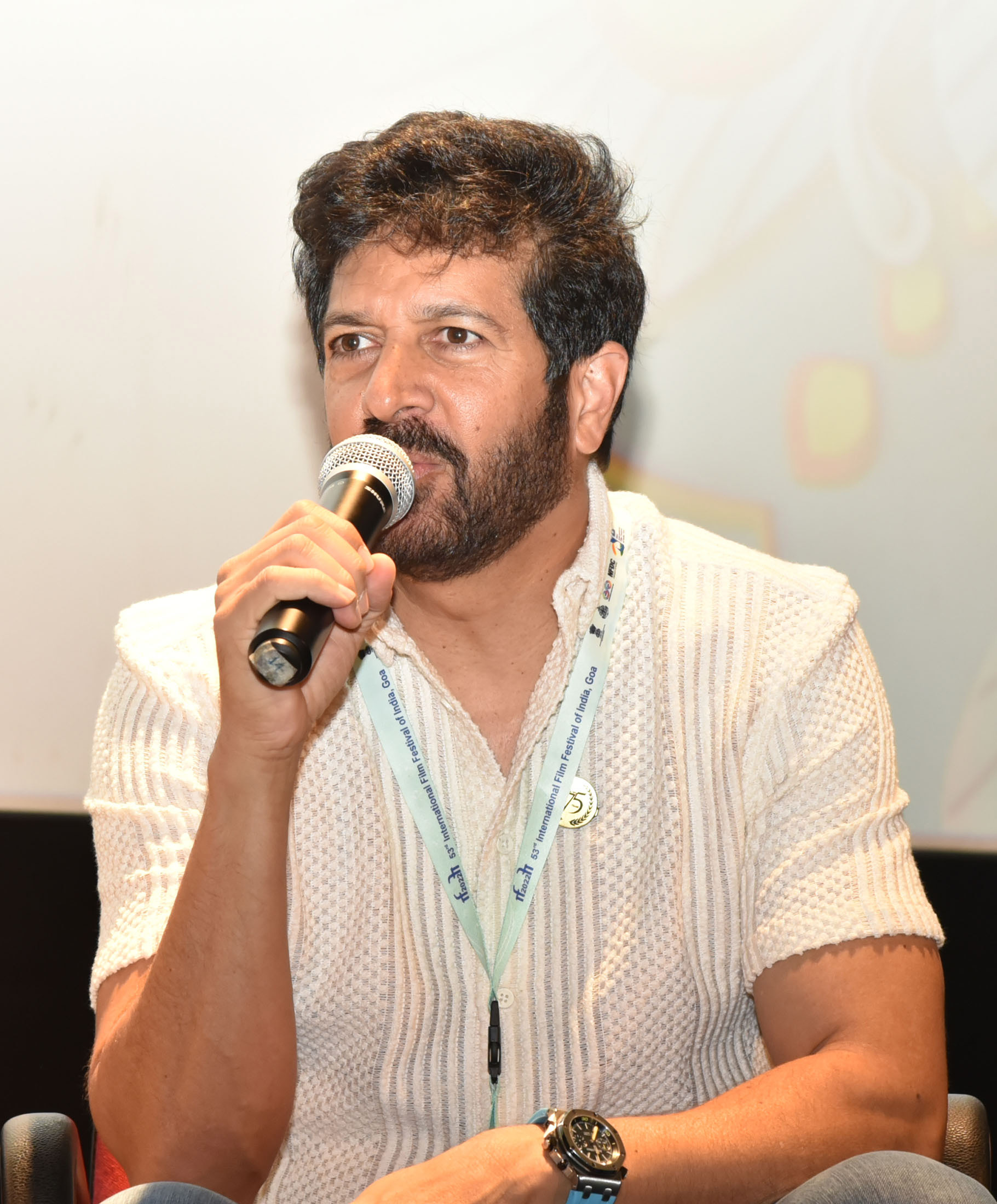
Kabir Khan used the phrase in his 2015 film Bajrangi Bhaijaan as a greeting

The slogan is painted on the walls of a mandir (Note: Prayer room in this case.) in a house in the 1994 film Hum Aapke Hain Koun..!.

It is used as a salutation in the 2015 film Bajrangi Bhaijaan. The director states that he grew up hearing "Jai Shri Ram" as a benevolent expression, "rooted in our culture", but that the words have become aggressive. A 2017 Bhojpuri film, Pakistan Me Jai Shri Ram depicts the hero as a devotee of Ram who enters Pakistan and kills terrorists while chanting the slogan. Stickers stating Hello nahīṃ, bolo Jaya Śrī Rāma (transl. "Don't say hello but say Victory to Rama") became popular on the vehicles and telephones of people running small businesses. A 2018 song, "Hindu Blood Hit", features psychedelic repetitions of the slogan and goes on to warn Indian Muslims that their time is up. Another song from 2017, "Jai Shree Ram DJ Vicky Mix", hopes for a time in the future in which "there will continue to be a Kashmir but no Pakistan". The song "Jai Shree Ram" is part of the film music in the 2022 action-adventure Ram Setu. The 2023 film Adipurush had a song with the same name.

In Indian English literature, the works of Amish Tripathi often feature protagonists who declare "Jai Shri Ram". One example is in Legend of Suheldev, featuring a coalition uniting Indian Hindus and Muslims in opposition to the Ghaznavids, and chants of Jai Shri Ram and Jai Maa Bharati (transl. Victory to Mother India) exist within a plot emphasizing national unity over caste or religious lines.

In 2022, Jujaru Nagaraju, a handloom weaver in Andhra Pradesh weaved a 60 metre long silk sari with "Jai Sri Ram" written over 30 000 times in 13 Indian languages.

== See also ==
- Jai Shri Krishna, Sanskrit expression, translating as "Victory to Krishna"
- Radhe Radhe, Hindi expression used as a greeting and salutation
- Deus vult (God wills it), Christian motto and battle cry
- Allahu Akbar (God is the Greatest), used in various contexts by Muslims and Arabs around the world
- Am Yisrael Chai, Hebrew expression meaning "the People of Israel live"
