= Question Hour =

First hour of a sitting session of India's Lok Sabha where questions can be raised

Question Hour is the first hour of a sitting session of the Lok Sabha devoted to questions that Members of Parliament raise about any aspect of administrative activity. The concerned Minister is obliged to answer to the Parliament, either orally or in writing, depending on the type of question raised. Questions are one of the ways Parliament can hold the Executive accountable for its actions. It is very useful for the Indian government.

== Types of question ==
There are four types of questions—starred, non-starred, short notice questions and questions to private members.

1) Starred questions are those for which an oral answer is expected. Answers to such question may be followed by supplementary questions by member.

These questions are printed in green colour and are marked with asterisk sign '*', in order to distinguish from other questions.

2) Non-starred questions are those for which a written reply is expected. After the reply has been provided, no supplementary question can be asked. A notice period is to be given to the minister to reply to a question.

These questions are printed in white colour and not more than 230 of these questions can be listed for a day in the Lok Sabha.

3) Short notice questions are those which are asked on matters of urgent public importance and thus, can be asked on a shorter notice i.e. less than 10 days. These questions can be answered orally and supplementary questions can be asked.

These questions are printed in light pink colour.

4) Questions to private members are those which are asked to members who are not ministers.

These questions are printed in yellow colour.

However, if a member seeks to ask a question urgently and cannot wait for the duration of the notice period, then the member can do so provided it is accepted by the Speaker of the Lok Sabha. Such questions are called supplementary questions.

== Recent changes ==
The following procedural changes have been in force since the 5th session of the 15th Lok Sabha:

- A 15-day notice period is to be given to the minister to respond to a question in Parliament (the concept of minimum and maximum notice duration has been removed). The notice duration used to be a minimum of 10 days or maximum of 21 days.
- The Speaker now has the authority to direct answers to a starred question asked by a member in case of their absence on the day their name was called.
- A member is now required to make a statement in the House correcting the reply given by him or her earlier, irrespective of whether the reply given pertained to a starred or unstarred or a short notice question.
- The maximum questions, starred or unstarred, a member is now entitled to give is 10 per day.

== Question Hour in other legislatures ==
This sort of a process where elected representatives ask questions that are replied by the Prime Minister or other government ministers is part of parliamentary tradition in many other countries. The Question Hour in the Indian Parliament is similar to the Prime Minister's Questions in the House of Commons of the United Kingdom, the First Minister's Questions in the Scottish Parliament and Senedd Cymru/Welsh Parliament, and the Question Period in the House of Commons of Canada.

== Notable Events ==
=== Mundhra scandal ===
India's very first major financial scam was brought to light during the 2nd Lok Sabha when Feroze Gandhi questioned the finance ministry regarding government owned Life Insurance Corporation's unauthorised investment into Haridas Mundhra's companies. It eventually resulted in the resignation of the then finance Minister T. T. Krishnamachari.

=== Puducherry licence scandal ===
In 1974, during the 5th Lok Sabha, a licence scandal was unearthed during question hour. A memorandum allegedly signed by 21 MPs were submitted by traders of Puducherry to the Union Commerce Ministry to grant licenses for importing various items. The signatures were forged on the behest of Indira Gandhi's key aide, Lalit Narain Mishra.

== See also ==
- Interpellation (politics)
