= Jan Breman =

Dutch sociologist (born 1936)

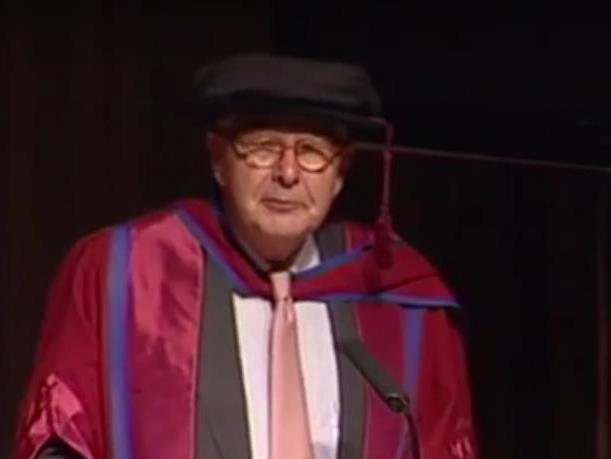
- Breman at the SOAS University of London, 2013
- Born: 24 July 1936 (age 90); Amsterdam
- Title: Professor emeritus

Academic work
- Discipline: Sociology
- Institutions: University of Amsterdam

Johannes Cornelis "Jan" Breman (born 24 July 1936, in Amsterdam) is a Dutch sociologist and an emeritus professor of the University of Amsterdam. He was awarded an Honorary Doctorate at Institute of Social Studies (ISS) on 29 October 2009. His inaugural lecture was entitled: The Great Transformation in a Globalized Perspective.

He is a Fellow of the International Institute for Asian Studies.

In 1988 Breman became a member of the Royal Netherlands Academy of Arts and Sciences. He was elected a member of Academia Europaea in 1989.

He has been known for the concept "footloose labour" in India. Footloose labour consists of those proletariats who are pushed out of agriculture labour market, hence depend on casual labour. They have to engage in multiple occupations to sustain themselves. Due to rural inequality they have to do seasonal migration to well off states such as Punjab and Haryana. This class of free wage labourers, especially after mid-1990s, are called "footloose labour".

== Selected works ==
- Breman, Jan et al. (2019). The Social Question in the Twenty-First Century: A Global View. California: University of California Press. ISBN 0520302400.
- Breman, Jan (2013). At work in the informal economy of India. A perspective from the bottom up. New Delhi, Oxford University Press. ISBN 9780198090342

== See also ==
- Social question
