= 2022 Karauli violence =

Communal violence broke out in Karauli on April 2, 2022

Hindu–Muslim sectarian violence occurred in the town of Karauli on 2 April 2022, when a Hindu New Year bike-rally organised by Sangh Parivar organisations passed through a Muslim locality with inflammatory slogans and music. Stone-pelting from surrounding houses, local people attacking with sticks and arson, resulted in injuries to 20 people, including policemen, and damage to properties of 80 people of both communities.

== Background ==
=== Shobha Yatra ===
On 2 April 2022, a bike rally was organized by Vishva Hindu Parishad (VHP), the Rashtriya Swayamsevak Sangh (RSS) and the Bajrang Dal, called the "Shobha Yatra" to celebrate the Chaitra Pratipada Nav Samvatsar or the Hindu New Year. The rally was planned to go through the Muslim-dominated area of Karauli and approval was taken from the Karauli District Administration.

=== Popular Front of India ===
Popular Front of India (PFI) had written a letter to Rajasthan Chief Minister Ashok Gehlot two days before the procession about the violence targeting Hindu Shoba Yatra, which prompted many to allege that the violence was planned. The letter from PFI warned the Gehlot led government about the possibility of violence due to the Hindu Shoba yatra which was to pass from the Muslim-dominated area.

== Violence ==
The motorcycle procession of around 400 people celebrating the Hindu New Year was moving ahead and was planned to move through the Muslim-dominated Karauli district of Rajasthan. Approvals were already taken from the Karauli district administration.

The violence erupted when the religious motorcade procession crossed a mosque in the market area. As they reached the mosque, some miscreants started pelting stones on them and as they group retaliated, violence broke out.

"Hindu outfits were taking out a religious bike rally on the occasion of Hindu new year today evening. While the procession reached near a mosque, some miscreants pelted stones on them. This resulted in stone pelting and arson by the other side too in which a few two-wheelers and shops were torched. The situation is under control now and a large number of police personnel have been deployed," said ADG Administration and Law and Order, Hawa Singh Ghumaria

The violence resulted in several bikes being burnt and over a dozen shops and houses arsoned.

Deputy Leader of the Opposition in the Rajasthan Assembly, Rajendra Rathore alleged that attack on Hindu procession was pre-planned as hundred of stones were already being collected a day before. The FIR further stated that the incident was planned and the Karauli Kotwali SHO Rameshwar Dayal Meena further stated that the rally was passing by peacefully. "Police tried to intervene, but stones and sticks rained on them from Muslim houses and a mosque,"

== Immediate response ==
=== Imposition of curfew ===
With violence erupting in Karauli which is around 170 km from Rajasthan's capital Jaipur, curfew was imposed under Section 144 in the violence hit area till the morning of 4 April 2022. The curfew was later extended to 7 April 2022 which was further extended to 10 April 2022. The curfew was further extended till 17 April 2022 but few relaxation were made.

=== Suspension of internet services ===
Internet services were suspended in Karauli after the broke out of violence. The internet services remain suspended for the next few days.

== Investigation ==
=== Special Investigation Team (SIT) ===
A Special Investigation Team was formed on 3 April 2022 to probe the violence. The SIT was led by Additional Superintended of Police.

=== Independent committees ===
==== Congress committee ====
The ruling Rajasthan Congress formed a 3-member fact-finding committee in the Karauli violence on 4 April 2022. The committee included Members of Legislative Assembly Jitendra Singh and Rafiq Khan along with Karauli district in-charge Lalit Yadav. The panel is planned to visit Karauli and submit its report to Rajasthan Pradesh Congress Committee.

==== BJP committee ====
Bharatiya Janata Party (BJP) also launched a probe and formed a 10-member committee to investigate the violence. Headed by the Leader of Opposition in Rajasthan Assembly, Rajendra Singh Rathore, the final report was presented to BJP Rajasthan unit President Satish Poonia.

=== Administrative probe ===
The Rajasthan Government ordered an administrative probe on 8 April 2022, roughly a week later. The probe, headed by Rajasthan Home Secretary, will have to submit its report to the state government in 15 days. IAS Kailash Chand Meena, Divisional Commissioner of Kota under the Government of Rajasthan's Home Department, was later appointed as the new investigating officer.

=== Judicial probe ===
The Bharatiya Janata Party's (BJP) Rajasthan unit President, Satish Poonia demanded a judicial probe in the communal violence indicating that the Congress government in Rajasthan was pursuing "appeasement politics" and aiding "Communalism".

== Aftermath ==
=== Major reshuffle of top officials ===
On the night of 13 April 2022, 69 Indian Administrative Services (IAS) officials were transferred in a major reshuffle. Among them was the collector of the violence hit Karauli district, Rajendra Singh Shekhawat. Ajit Kumar Singh replaced Shekhawat as the collector of Karauli. Other than Karauli, collectors of four other districts were also transferred. Prakash Chand Sharma has been transferred to Banswara, Nakate Shiv Prasad to Alwar, Sourabh Swami to Pratapgarh, and Nishant Jain to Jalore.

=== Stopping leaders from visiting karauli ===
On 13 April 2022, BJP MP and Bharatiya Janata Yuva Morcha (BJYM) chief Tejasvi Surya was stopped from entering violence hit Karauli. Along with supporters and BJP Rajasthan unit Chief, Satish Poonia wanted to meet the victims of the Karauli violence but they were denied the permission by the Rajasthan Police. After being stopped, the leaders and the supporters staged a peaceful protest at the Karauli border but the police dispersed them with force.

Later Tejasvi Surya, Satish Poonia and other BJP workers were detained by the Rajasthan Police.

==== Permission to PFI to take out march ====
Though the leader were dispersed or detained and not allowed to enter the violence hit area with the reasoning of area under curfew, the Islamic Organization Popular Front of India (PFI) was allowed and given permission to take out march in the area.
