= Jai Siya Ram =

Hindu expression in praise of Rama and Sita

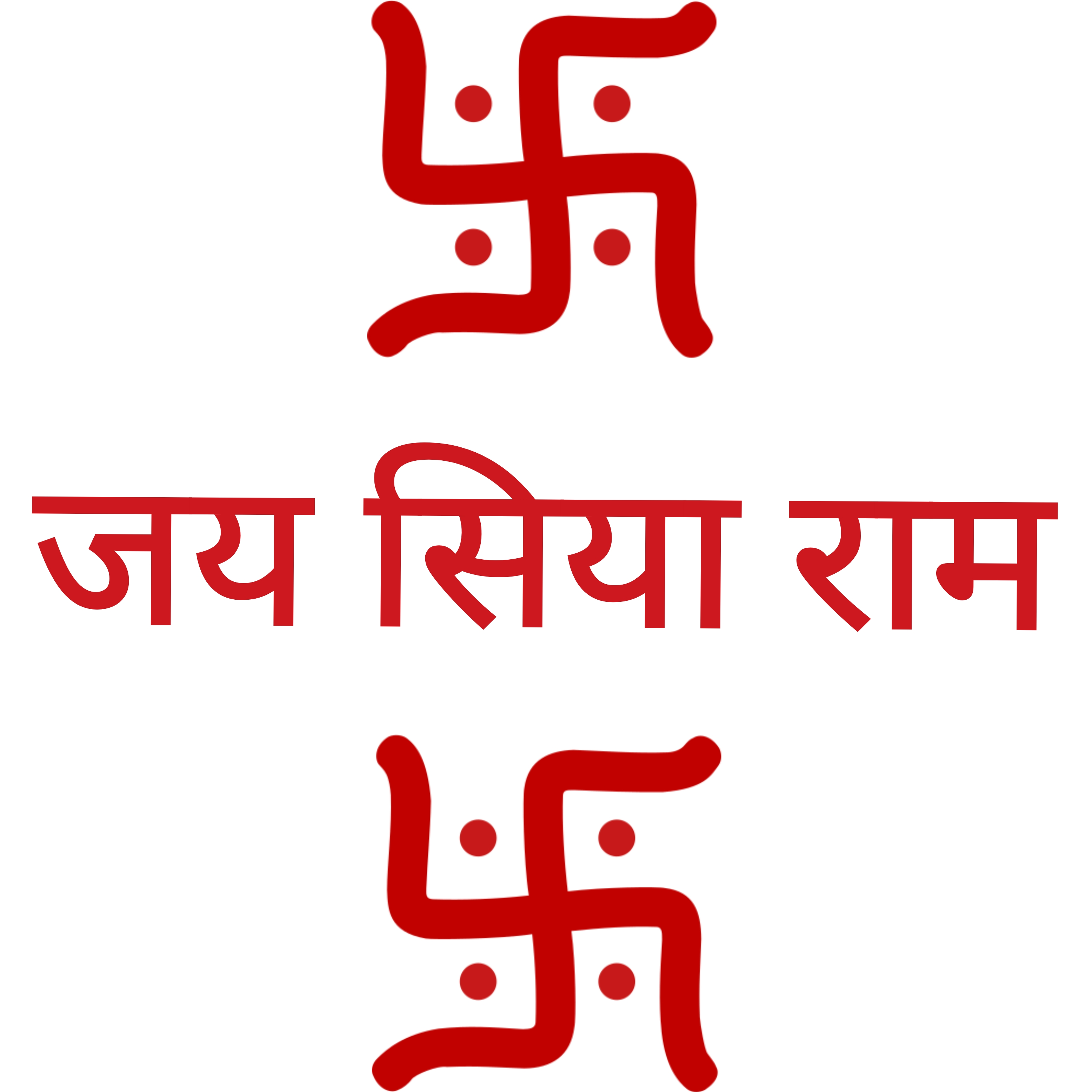
'Jai Siya Rāma' written in Devanagari

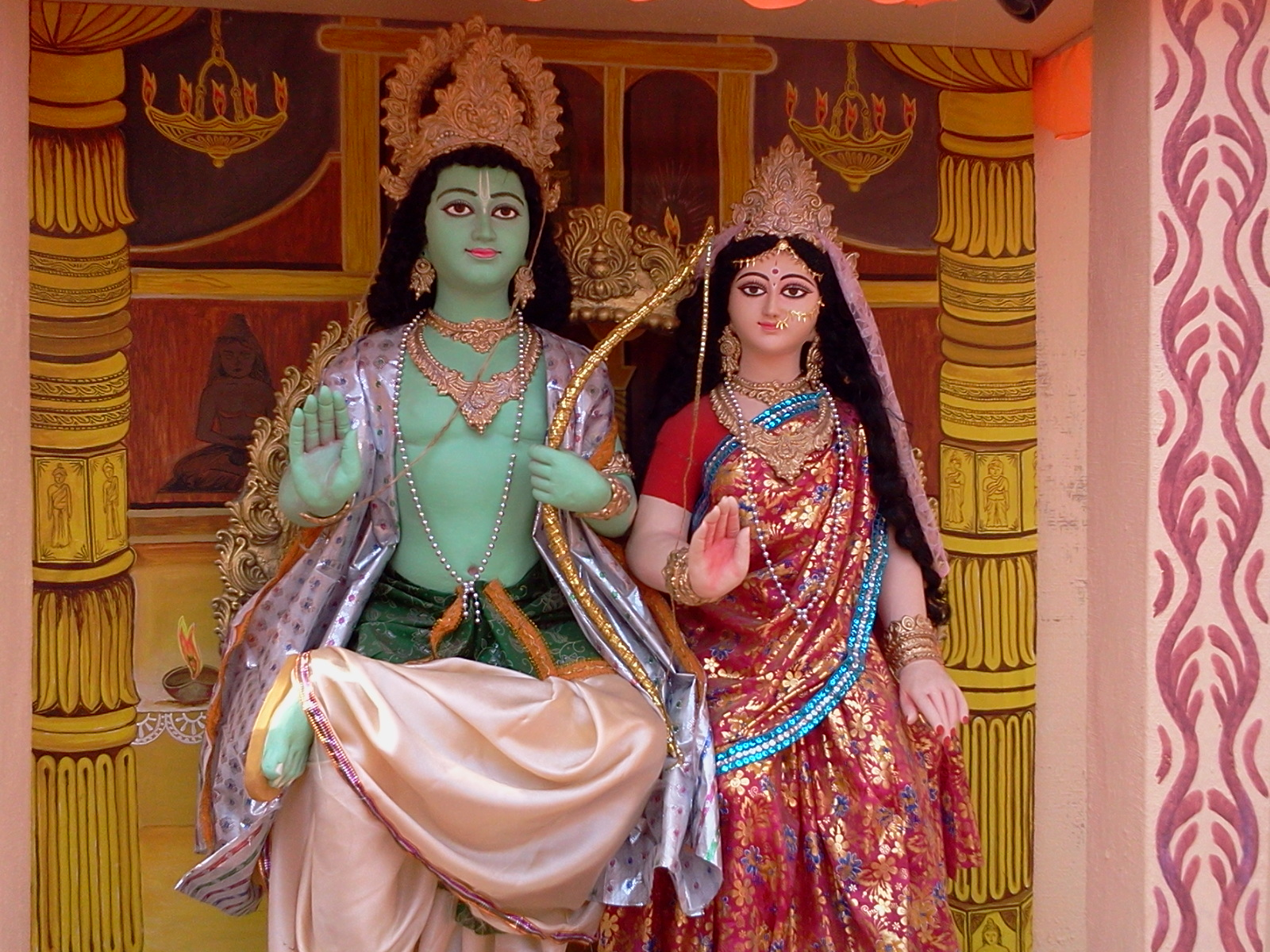
Statues of Rama and Sita

Jai Siya Ram or Jai Siyaram (IAST: Jaya Siyā Rāma) is a Hindi expression, translating as "Victory to Sita and Rama". Siya is a regional variant of Sita. Sociologist Jan Breman states that it was used as "a greeting of welcome in the countryside since time immemorial".

== Usage ==
Jai Siya Ram is used while worshipping Rama and Sita. It is often used during the recital of Ramayana, Ramcharitmanas, especially the Sundara Kanda. Many devotional songs with the theme Jai Siya Ram have been sung by singers such as Jagjit Singh, Mohammed Rafi, among others. Similar songs have been sung in various regional languages. The chants of Jai Siya Ram are very common in religious places and gatherings, for example, the Kumbh Mela.
